= List of defunct social networking services =

A social networking service is an online platform that people use to build social networks or social relationships with other people who share similar personal or career interests, activities, backgrounds or real-life connections.

This is a list of notable defunct social networking services that have Wikipedia articles.

Overview of defunct social networking services
Name	Type	Focus
2channel	Textboard	Japanese Image Board
360voice	Blog	
43 Things		Goal setting and achievement
8tracks.com		Streaming user-curated playlists
Advogato		Free software and open source software development
AIM	Instant messaging	
Amen		
Amina – Chechen Republic Online		Chechen diaspora community
Amino		
App.net	Blog	Microblogging
AsianAve		Asian Americans
Ask.fm		Anonymous chat
Audimated		Independent music
Avatars United		Online games
Baidu Space		
Bebo		General
bianca.com		Software developers
BitClout		Microblogging, cryptocurrency
Blip.no		Norwegian community
Bolt		Teenagers
Boredat		U.S. college students
Capazoo		Blogging, music, photo, and video sharing
Chictopia		Fashion enthusiasts
Classical Lounge		Classical music fans
Cloob		Popular in Iran
Cohost		Blogging, micro-blogging, photos
Convoz		
Cucumbertown		Recipes
DailyBooth		Daily photo uploads
Delicious (website)		Web bookmarks
Disaboom		People with disabilities
Dodgeball	MoSoSo	
DontStayIn		Clubbing (primarily UK)
Dubsmash		Video lip syncing
eConozco		Spanish speaking professionals
Edmodo		Social learning network for schools
Elfwood		Science fiction and fantasy art and writing
Ello	Blog	
Emojli		
Eons.com		For baby boomers and ages 40+
Essembly		Politics
Everloop		People under age 13
eWorld		
Experience Project		Life experiences
Eyegroove		
Ezboard	Bulletin board system	Hosted user-created message boards
FaceGlat		Haredi Jews
Faves.com		Bookmarks
FFFFOUND!		Image recommendations
FitFinder		Anonymous UK student microblogging
Fitocracy		Fitness
Fling		Sending images to random strangers all around the world, notoriously abused for sexting
Focus.com		Business professionals
Foodie.fm		Grocery shopping and recipe discovery
Foodily.com		Recipes
Fotolog		Sharing photos
Foursquare City Guide		Location-based mobile social network
FriendFeed		Feed aggregator
Friends Reunited		Reunions
Friendster		Friends
GamerDNA		Computer and video games
Gapyear.com		Travel
Gather.com		Social, political and cultural topics
GEnie	Bulletin board system	
Gentlemint		Men
Glee.com		LGBTQ
Gogoyoko		Musicians and music lovers.
Goodwizz		Matchmaking and personality games. Global, based in France.
Google+	Blog	Microblogging
Google Buzz		
Grono.net		Discussion forums, sharing photos, links to cultural events in particular cities, the sale of property and job searches.
Heello		Microblogging
Hello		
Highlight		
Hi5		Video games
Hive		
Hospitality Club		Hospex
Houseparty		Video chatting
Huddles		Short-form-video
Hyves		Social (Dutch)
ICQ		
IdeaPlane		
Itsmy		Mobile community for blogging, friends, and personal TV-shows
iTunes Ping		Music
iTwixie		Social networking site for tween girls.
iWiW		Hungarian
Jaiku		Microblogging and lifestreaming service
Jiepang		Location-based mobile. In Chinese.
JuiceCaster		Mobile app
Juvenation		People with type 1 diabetes
Kactoos		Group purchase
Keek		Upload video status updates, which were called "keeks"
Kiwibox		Teenagers
Koo		
Koofers	Academic	Social studying network for college students
Lifeknot		Shared interests, hobbies
LinkExpats		Expatriates in 100+ countries
Livemocha		Online language learning
Loopt	Geolocation	Real-time location sharing between friends
LunarStorm		Swedish teenagers
Makeoutclub		General
Me2day	Blog	Microblogging in South Korea
MeatballWiki	Wiki	
Meerkat		Broadcast live video streaming through mobile devices
Meetro	MoSoSo	
Meez		Chat rooms
MemeStreams		Memes
MetroMates	Itinerary sharing	Metro travellers in India
MiGente.com		Hispanics
Miiverse		Video games, specifically those released on the Nintendo 3DS or Wii U
Mivasocial		Africans
MixBit		
Mixx		Blogs
Mobli		Social mobile photo and video-sharing website
MOG		Music
Mugshot		Aggregator from Red Hat, with compatible desktop software and an official Firefox plugin
Multiply		Real world sharing
Mulu		Product recommendations
Musical.ly		Social media video app for short lip-sync, comedy, and talent videos
MyMFB		Muslims
My Opera	Blog	Blogging, mobile blogging, photo sharing, connecting with friends, Opera Link and Opera Unite.
MyVetwork		Military veterans
Natter Social Network		micro-microblogging
Naymz		Professional networking
Nearby		People nearby
Netlog		Belgians
Netropolitan Club		Wealthy people
Nettby		Norwegians
NK.pl		School, college and friends in Poland
Omegle		18+ video chatting platform
OpenFeint		Mobile gaming
Orkut		First social networking service by Google
OUTeverywhere		Gay/LGBTQ community
Pebble		Microblogging
Periscope		Video streaming
Pheed		
Piczo		Blogging website for teens; bought by Posh Media Group
Planet Cancer		Young adults with cancer
PlanetAll		Calendar and address site
Plaxo		Aggregator
Play.fm		Disc jockeys
Player.me		Video games, now entertainment news
Playfire		Computer and video games
Playlist.com		Music
Plaxo		Aggregator
Poparazzi		
Posterous		Blogging platform
Poupéegirl		Japanese avatars
Pownce		Microblogging application (similar to Twitter)
Qaiku		Micro-blogging and live-streaming service comparable to Twitter and Jaiku
Quechup		Friendship, dating
Raptr		Video games
Rentboy.com		Male sex workers
Rupture		Gamers
Rec Room	Virtual reality	Social gaming platform
Ryze		Business
Sarahah		Feedback from friends and coworkers
ScuttlePad		Children aged 6–11
Shelfari		Books
Sixdegrees.com		Web of contacts
SkillPages		Skilled people
Skyrock		French-speaking world
Snip.it		Articles, videos, and images
SocialVibe (TrueX)		Charity
Skype		video chatting
So.cl		Millennials; made by Microsoft FUSE Labs.
Sonico.com		Latin America and Spanish and Portuguese speaking regions
Soup.io		Microblogging
Spire		Personal accomplishments
Spring.me		Meeting people
Stickam		Live video streaming and chat.
StockPickr		Stock picks
Streetlife		Location-based
Students Circle Network		Connected students, teachers and institutions to course resources and study groups.
StudiVZ		University students, mostly in German-speaking countries
StumbleUpon		Web pages, photos, and videos
Surfbook		Netherlands
Talkbiznow		Business networking
Talenthouse		Creative collaboration
Taltopia		Artists / fans / talent professionals
tbh		
Tea Party Community		Conservatism in the United States
TOTSE	Bulletin board system	Controversial files
Tout		
TravBuddy.com		Travel
Travel Companion Exchange		Travel companions
tribe.net		Friends networks
Triller		
Tsu		Message, photos
Twoo.com		Entertainment
TV Time	Social television	Entertainment
tvtag		Entertainment
Vampirefreaks.com		Gothic and industrial subculture
Viddy	Mobile app	Short-video sharing
Vine		Social media video app for short lip-sync, comedy, and talent videos
Virb		Artists, including musicians and photographers
Voat		Censor free reddit clone
Vox	Blog	Blogging
WAYN (website)		Travel and lifestyle
WeeWorld		Children and teenagers aged 9 to 17
We Heart It		Image sharing
Werkenntwen		
Whisper		
Windows Live Messenger	Instant messaging	
Windows Live Spaces		
Woo Media		Entertainment
Wretch	Blog	Taiwan
Xanga	Blog	Blogs and "metro" areas
Yahoo! 360°		
Yahoo! Answers		
Yahoo! GeoCities	WorldWideWeb	
Yahoo! Kickstart		
Yahoo! Mash		
Yahoo! Meme		
Yahoo! Messenger	Instant messaging	
Yo		Quick connections
Yookos		Photos, videos, blogs, games
Zoopy		Share videos, photos and audio clips
