= List of virtual communities with more than 1 million users =

This is a list of notable active virtual communities with more than 1 million registered members.

Name	Description or focus	Date launched	Registered users	Registration	Global Alexa page ranking
Avaaz	Global community and political activism	2007	69000000	Open	N/A
BlackPlanet	Black Americans	1999	20000000	Open	7193
Blind	Employees	2013	2000000	Open with verified work email	43680
Bluesky	Microblogging	2024	34000000	Open to people 13 and older	N/A
Busuu	Language learning community (headquartered in Madrid, Spain)	2008	12000000	Open	8049
Buzznet	Music and pop-culture	2005	10000000	Open	6955
CafeMom	Mothers	2006	1250000	Open to moms and moms-to-be	1293
Care2	Green living, social activism, animal rights	1998	9961947	Open	1930
CaringBridge	Not for profit providing free websites that connect family and friends during a serious health event, care and recovery.	1997	9500000	Open to people 18 and older	4279
Classmates.com	School, college, work and the military	1995	50000000	Open to people 18 and older	3284
CouchSurfing	Worldwide network for making connections between travelers and the communities they visit	2003	18000000	Open	2231
Cyworld	General, popular in South Korea	1999	24000000	Open	1616
DeviantArt	Art community	2000	22000000	Open to people 13 and older	131
Duolingo	Language learning community and forums	2011	500000000	Open to all ages. Forums open to people 13 and older	547
Draugiem.lv	General (primarily Latvia, Lithuania, and Hungary)	2004	2600466	Invitation only	2698
Douban	Chinese Web 2.0 website providing user review and recommendation services for movies, books, and music	2005	46850000	Open	106
DXY.cn	Chinese online community for physicians, health care professionals, pharmacies and facilities	2000	2000000	Open	8367
English, baby!	Students and teachers of English as a second language	2000	1600000	Open	29585
Facebook	General	2004	2800000000	Open to people 13 and older	3
Fetlife	People who are into BDSM	2008	11000000	Open to people "of legal age to see adult content"	4131
Fishbrain	Mobile social network, fishing	2010	2200000	Open	436164
Flickr	Photo sharing, commenting, photography related networking, worldwide	2004	114000000	Open	48
Fotki	Photo sharing, video hosting, photo contests, journals, forums, flexible privacy protection, friend's feed, audio comments and unlimited custom design integration	1998	1632565	Open	8011
Foursquare	Location-based mobile social network	2009	20000000	Open	817
Gaia Online	Anime and games, popular in the US, Canada and Europe, and moderately popular in Asia	2003	23523663	Open to people 13 and older	6277
Geni.com	Families, genealogy	2007	15000000	Open	5958
Goodreads	Library cataloging, book lovers	2006	90000000	Open	327
GrabCAD	GrabCAD Community is the largest online CAD library, design and 3D printing tutorials, and a network of additive professionals	2009	11000000	Open	N/A
Habbo	General for teens. Over 31 communities worldwide. Chat room and user profiles.	2000	268000000	Open to people 13 and older	15255
HER	Sapphic community app for queer women, non-binary and trans people. Community groups, online events and IRL events. 114 countries. 15 million users.	2015	15000000	Open to people 18 and over	1230
hi5	General, popular in Nepal, Mongolia, Thailand, Romania, Jamaica, Central Africa, Portugal and Latin America	2003	80000000	Open to people 13 and older	902
Instagram	General	2010	2000000000	Open	38
Kiwibox	General	1999	2400000	Open to people 13 and older	104563
Kobo	Reading platform and social network	2009	14500000	Open	7277
Last.fm	Music	2002	30000000	Open	772
LibraryThing	Book lovers	2005	1300000	Open to people 13 and older	10800
LINE	Japan, Indonesia, Taiwan, and Thailand	2011	178000000	Open	N/A
LinguaLeo	Online English language learning website, popular among the Russian-speaking diaspora	2010	3749061	Open	7480
LinkedIn	Business and professional networking	2003	774000000	Open to people 18 and older	12
LiveJournal	Blogging, popular in Russia and among the Russian-speaking diaspora abroad	1999	17564977	Open (OpenID)	115
Mastodon	An open-source, self-hosted and globally interconnected microblogging community	2016	8700000	Open, depends on the instance	N/A
mixi	Japan	2000	24323160	Open	232
MocoSpace	Mobile community, worldwide	2005	3000000	Open to people 14 and older	9882
MyHeritage	Family-oriented social network service	2003	30000000	Open	3756
MyLife	Locating friends and family, keeping in touch (formerly Reunion.com)	2002	51000000	Open	1765
Myspace	General	2003	30000000	Open to ages 13 and older	161
Odnoklassniki	Connecting with old classmates, popular in Russia and former Soviet republics	2006	45000000	Open	65
Open Diary	First online blogging community, founded in 1998	1998	5000000	Open to people 13 and older	28134
Ravelry	Knitting and crochet	2007	6700000	Open	5189
Reddit	Social news, link sharing and commenting	2005	73000000	Open	8
Sina Weibo	Social microblogging site in China	2009	300000000	Open	28
SoundCloud	Repository of original music pieces and networking	2008	10000000	Open	299
Stack Overflow	Question and answer knowledge market site for programmers	2008	16000000	Open to people 13 and older	41
Steemit	Blockchain-based social networking	2016	1300000	Open	5577
Tagged	General	2004	100000000	Open	288
Twitter	General, microblogging, RSS, updates	2006	330000000	Open to all ages	12
Tylted	Mobile social game network	2007	3000000	Open to people 14 and older	737508
Vkontakte	General, including music upload, listening and search. Popular in Russia and former Soviet republics.	2006	208833674	Open	38
Vampirefreaks.com	Gothic and industrial subculture	1999	1931049	Open to users 13 and over	21052
Viadeo	Global social and campus networking available in English, French, German, Spanish, Italian and Portuguese	2004	35000000	Open/lift	435
XING	Business (primarily Europe, specifically Germany, Austria, and Switzerland)	2003	11100000	Open	270

== Defunct ==
Name	Description or focus	Date launched	Date closed	Peak registered users	Registration
Bebo	General	2005	2013	117000000	Open to people 13 and older
TravBuddy.com	Travel	2005	2018	1588000 (2007)	Open to people 18 and older
Plaxo	Aggregator	2002	2017	63000000 (2011)	Open
Flixster	Movies	2007	2019	50000000 (2008)	Open to people 13 and older
Xanga	Blogs and "metro" areas	1999	2013	27000000 (2006)	Open
Fotolog	Photoblogging, popular in South America and Spain	2002	2019	20000000 (2008)	Open
Sonico	General, popular in Latin America and Spanish and Portuguese speaking regions	2007		50000000 (2008)	Open to people 13 and older
Edmodo	Social learning network for schools	2008	2022	50000000 (2008)	Open to people 13 and older
Netlog	General, popular in Europe, Turkey, and Canada	1999	2015	95000000 (2008)	Open to people 13 and older
WAYN	Travel and lifestyle	2003	2016	10000000 (2007)	Open to people 13 and older
Hyves	General, mostly popular in the Netherlands	2004	2013	10097000 (2011)	Open
GetGlue	Social network for entertainment	2008	2015	2000000 (2012)	Open
Itsmy	Mobile community worldwide, blogging, friends, personal TV-shows	2008	2014	2500000 (2008)	Open
Jiepang	Location-based mobile social network, in the Chinese language	2010	2016	3000000 (2012)	Open
iWiW	Hungarian social networking web service	2002	2014	4000000 (2011)	Invite-only
Miiverse	Social Network for Nintendo's Wii U home console and 3DS handheld family where users can post about games and ask for help on a particular game	2012	2017	4500000	Nintendo Network members only
Livemocha	Online language learning	2007	2016	5000000 (2010)	Open
StudiVZ	University students, mostly in German-speaking countries. School students and those out of education sign up via its partner sites SchülerVZ and MeinVZ	2005	2022	17000000 (2010)	Open
Taringa!	General (primarily Argentina)	2004	2024	11000000 (2011)	Open to people 13 and older
Delicious	Social bookmarking allowing users to locate and save websites that match their own interests	2003	2017	8822921 (2010)	Open
Koofers	Social studying network for college students	2008	2019	1000000 (2014)	Open
NK.pl	School, college and friends, popular in Poland	2006	2021	11000000 (2011)	Open
Nexopia	Canadian social networking website	2003	2012	1400000 (2011)	Open
WeeWorld	Scottish social networking and messaging website	2000	2017	30000000 (2006)	Open
Friendster	General, popular in Southeast Asia	2002	2015	90000000 (2008)	Open
Friends Reunited	UK-based, school, college, work, sport and streets	July 2000	26 February 2016	23800000 (2010)	Open to people 13 and older
Koo	Indian micro-blogging platform	14 November 2019	3 July 2024	60000000	Open
Orkut	General, owned by Google Inc. Popular in India and Brazil.	22 January 2004	30 September 2014	100000000	Open to people 18 and older, (Google login)
Raptr	Video games	2008	July 2018	25664	Open
Renren	Significant site in China, known as 校内 (Xiaonei) until August 2009.	2005	2022	160000000	Open
Skyrock	Social network in French-speaking world	2002	2023	22000000	Open
StumbleUpon	Stumble through websites that match users' selected interests	2001	June 30, 2018	20000000	Open
We Heart It	Image-based social network	2008	2023	25000000	Open to ages 13 and older

== See also ==
- List of virtual communities
- List of most popular social platforms
- List of social bookmarking websites
- List of most-played mobile games by player count
