= List of virtual communities =

This is a list of Wikipedia articles about virtual communities.

== Benchmark virtual communities ==
- Usenet, one of the original decentralized, distributed discussion group architectures.
- BBS: The WELL, GEnie, The Meta Network
- Academic: EIES, Usenet
- Webcomic: UserFriendly, Penny Arcade, Sluggy Freelance
- Virtual world/city: LucasFilm's Habitat, Second Life, Millsberry, Red Light Center, IMVU, Neopets, Roblox
- IM: ICQ, Yahoo! Messenger, Windows Live Messenger, AIM, Facebook Messenger, WhatsApp, Kik Messenger, WeChat, Viber, Discord, Skype, iMessage, KakaoTalk, Line, Telegram
- Internet Relay Chat (IRC): IRC networks
- MMORPG: EverQuest, Final Fantasy XI, RuneScape, World of Warcraft, Final Fantasy XIV, Star Wars: The Old Republic
- MOO: LambdaMOO
- Mososo: Dodgeball, Meetro, Foursquare
- MUD/MUSH: TinyMUD
- P2P: Kazaa, Morpheus, Napster, Limewire, BitTorrent
- Wiki: Wikipedia, WikiWikiWeb, MeatballWiki, Wetpaint, PBworks, TV Tropes
- WWW: eBay, Slashdot, Digg, Reddit
- Consumers: eBay, Amazon.com
- Software that enable online communities: Ning

== Additional virtual community listings ==
=== Discussion boards ===
- reddit
- Hacker News
- Dead Runners Society
- 4chan
- GameFAQs
- Something Awful
- Fark
- 2channel
- Zombie Squad
- IGN
- TOTSE

=== Art communities ===
- Albino Blacksheep
- DeviantArt
- Dulwich OnView
- Elfwood
- Newgrounds
- Tumblr

=== MUD, MUSH, MOO ===
- Category:MUD games
- Category:MU* games

=== Virtual world communities ===
- Category:Virtual world communities

=== Virtual reality communities ===
- Category:Virtual reality communities

=== Ethnicity-based communities ===
- 1Point3Acres
- Fillos de Galicia
- Laneros
- MIT BBS

=== Online Teaching Covens ===
- Coven of the Far Flung Net

=== Other types ===
- Pinboard
- bianca.com
- Scratch (an educational programming website by MIT)
- GameTZ.com (an online game, music, movie, and book trading community)
- CouchSurfing (free accommodation worldwide through hospitality exchange)
- Hospitality Club (free accommodation worldwide through hospitality exchange)
- Warm Showers (free accommodation worldwide through hospitality exchange for bicycle travelers)
- Meetup (an online service designed to facilitate real-world meetings of people involved in various virtual communities)
- Meetro (local focused communities)
- StumbleUpon (web surfing)
- Woozworld (virtual gaming community for youth)
- YTMND (Picture, Sound, Text)
- Group blogs
- TakingITGlobal (Youth - social networking for social good)
- CrossFit (a fitness program where users post their scores and comments on daily workouts)
- DXY.cn (an online community for physicians, health care professionals, pharmacies and facilities)

== See also ==
- List of virtual communities with more than 1 million users
- List of social bookmarking websites
- List of social networking websites
- List of Internet forums
- Lists of websites
- Support group
