= Talkbits =

Free voice mobile app

Talkbits was a free voice mobile app for iOS and Android that combined push-to-talk technology with social discovery. The application has been developed and maintained by OnAir Labs, an international mobile development company. As of December 2013, the Talkbits service is not available anymore.

Users were able to listen to a livestream of messages around their current physical location, send private voice messages to other users, and could join public discussions revolving around different topics. Based in Zurich, Moscow, Istanbul and São Paulo, the company has raised $2 million in venture financing from Russian Runa Capital. It was named among top-10 Russian web startups by The Moscow Times. Talkbits received the best mobile app award on Russian Startup Awards 2013 by The Next Web. Talkbits was officially launched in the US and the UK on February 12, 2013. On February 24 the app was launched in the Turkish market. Soon Talkbits announced plans to be rolled out in Singapore, Indonesia and Brazil, however as of December 2013, the iOS App is not available in the US App store. The Android version is available in Google Play as of March 2014, but the server appears to be shut down.

== See also ==
- List of defunct social networking services
