= Dead Runners Society =

Online running club

- Abbreviation: DRS
- Formation: 1991
- Founder: Chris Conn

The DRS flag includes a smiley emoticon, symbolizing computers, and a star, symbolizing the Lone Star State of Texas, where the group was founded in 1991

The Dead Runners Society (DRS) is a worldwide online running club. DRS is notable for its unusual role in the development of both the Internet and the sport of running. Founded by Chris Conn in 1991 as an electronic mailing list, DRS pre-dates widespread use of the World Wide Web. It is an early example of a virtual community formed around a non-professional topic. Many early DRS members were computer professionals, librarians, academics and researchers. Membership broadened with the growing use of email in the mid-1990s. Annual World Conferences have been held since 1993.

== Other DRS lists ==
The original DRS group, known as "the big list," now has about 1,700 members. Over the years, more than 20 sublists have been formed. Some deads subscribe to one (or more) of the sublists but are not subscribed to the big list or have set NOMAIL option on the big list. Sublists have a geographic or thematic focus.

- An example of a geographic group is the SOBER Deads (Southern Ontario and Buffalo Expired Runners).
- An example of a thematic group is TRI-DRS. for dead runners who are interested in triathlons, duathlons, and other multi-sport events. It was founded by Loreen Kail.
- DRS-readers and DRS-mind are examples of thematic groups for discussions.

Three Dead Runners Society groups also operate on the Facebook social networking website.

== Members ==
DRS members are known as "deads". Online discussion includes everything from meditation to marathon training—and even topics only marginally related to running. Deads also meet regularly at races. Deads range from beginning runners to elite athletes. One dead holds the world record for the one mile run for women age 70 and older. Other deads are coaches, race directors, writers and editors of running magazines, and developers of running-related software. Deads say the civilized level of discourse and strong sense of community sets DRS apart from other mailing lists.

=== Terminology ===
Over the years, the group has adopted, adapted, and coined various terms. Among them:

- eric: not eb.
- Clydesdale: a heavy runner.
- Encounter: a face-to-face meeting of Dead Runners.
- Filk: In DRS parlance, a running-related song in which new lyrics are written to an existing tune.
- Goomies: Post-run snacks and drinks, e.g. bagels, bananas, sports drinks, and water.
- Penguin: a slow runner (coined by John "the Penguin" Bingham).
- ORN: Obligatory Running Note. A brief note about a run appended to a message with no other running content.
- VRP: Virtual Running Partner. A dead who encourages another via private email.
- YMMV: Your Mileage May Vary. In DRS parlance, you may react differently to the shoe, medical treatment, training program, or other matter under discussion.

== History ==
The list founder is Chris Conn, a runner and software engineer in Austin, Texas. The Dead Runners Society is incorporated in Texas as a non-profit organization.

=== Name ===
The Dead Runners Society's name derives from the film Dead Poets Society which had as its motto Carpe Diem—Seize The Day. The Dead Runners Society amended this to Carpe Viam—Seize the Way (or Seize the Roadway).

=== DRS conferences ===
Since 1993, the DRS has been holding annual conferences in different cities, with the abbreviation DRSWCn. To encourage attendance, the host city generally creates a Web-based guide to their city's attractions.

- 2014, World Conference 2014: San Diego, California, U.S.
- 2012, World Conference 2012: Austin, Texas, U.S.
- 2010, World Conference XVIII: Gainesville, Florida, U.S. - CANCELLED
- 2009, World Conference XVII: St. Louis, Missouri, U.S.
- 2008,: Tacoma, Washington, U.S.
- 2007, World Conference XV: Torino, Italy
- 2006, World Conference XIV: Toronto, Ontario, Canada
- 2005, World Conference XIII: Tucson, Arizona, U.S.
- 2004, World Conference XII: Boston, Massachusetts, U.S.
- 2003, World Conference XI: Cupertino, California, U.S.
- 2002, World Conference X: Indianapolis, Indiana, U.S.
- 2001, World Conference IX: Albuquerque, New Mexico, U.S.
- 2000, World Conference VIII: New York, New York, U.S. VIII
- 1999, World Conference VII: Tucson, Arizona, U.S.
- 1998, World Conference VI: St. Louis, Missouri, U.S.
- 1997, World Conference V: Eugene, Oregon, U.S.
- 1996, World Conference IV: Cleveland, Ohio, U.S.
- 1995, World Conference III: San Francisco, California, U.S.
- 1994, World Conference II: St. Louis, Missouri, U.S.
- 1993, World Conference I: Washington, District of Columbia, U.S.

=== Books and tools by dead runners ===
Virtual (or long-distance) training and coaching is one of the benefits of belonging to DRS. Some members have created Web pages for running advice. A few have gone further and transferred their accumulated knowledge to paper or software applications. A few examples follow:

- Marathoning for Mortals by John Bingham
- Hal Higdon's Beginning Runner's Guide and Marathon: the Ultimate Training Guide by Hal Higdon
- Excel Running Log by Alan Rubé and David S. Hays

== See also ==
- List of virtual communities
