= Taltopia =

Online artistic community

Taltopia, LLC
- Company type: Private
- Website type: Online Artistic Community
- Founded: Los Angeles, California
- Headquarters: Los Angeles, California
- Key people: Allen Vartazarian, Co-Founder, Anthony Zanontian, Co-Founder
- Website: www.taltopia.com
- Registration: Required
- Launched: February 28, 2008
- Current status: Inactive

Taltopia was an online artistic community which connected aspiring artists with fans and talent industry professionals. It was launched in Los Angeles, California on February 28, 2008, by Allen Vartazarian, a UC Berkeley graduate, and Anthony Zanontian, a UC San Diego graduate.

Taltopia featured different forms of artistic expression, organized in a comprehensive category structure which currently includes Music, Art, Acting, Dance, Comedy, Modeling, and Other. Users can upload or embed images, audio, and video of their talent to be judged by the community of fans and critics.

== Funding ==
Called FameSource in its inception, Taltopia received a name change and its first investment of $800,000 in February 2008 from a private angel investor at an undisclosed valuation. Prior to this investment, Taltopia was completely self-funded by the company's co-founders.

== Taltopia Features ==
=== Fame and Shame Voting System ===
Similar to Digg's voting structure, registered users on Taltopia were judged by a Fame and Shame voting system which increased or decreased a media's rating, respectively.

=== User Pages ===
Every user had a personal page at the URL http://www.taltopia.com/username, where username was replaced by their username. This page may list the user's name, physical attributes, interests, hobbies, experience, and so forth. It also exhibited the user's most recent work and his or her 'Fan Club'.

=== Famebucks ===
Famebucks were the pseudo currency used on Taltopia. The currency could be earned by using the site's features, purchased through PayPal, or donated by other registered users. Famebucks were used to self-promote and support other artists on the site.

=== Wall of Fame ===
Registered users bid with Famebucks on one of the 23 available spots to promote their media. The top spot was featured on the front page, giving further attention to the highest bidding talent.

=== Contests ===
Members could participate in two types of contests, sponsored and user-generated. Sponsored contests were put on by Taltopia's staff, often in partnership with sponsoring companies. These contests offered prizes and opportunities to participants. User-generated contests, on the other hand, were created by registered members who can set a contest description, duration, and requirements to enter. After voting was complete, winners of user-generated contests earned a prize-pool of Famebucks.

=== Castings ===
Industry professionals looking to recruit creative talent post casting/job notices; members could search for and apply to these opportunities by submitting content they had already uploaded to the site for consideration.

== See also ==
- List of defunct social networking websites
- Professional network service
- Social network service
