= MIT BBS =

Chinese bulletin board system

MIT BBS (Chinese: 未名空间; pinyin: Wèimíng Kōngjiān; lit. 'Unnamed Space') was a Chinese-language bulletin board system website.

== History ==
In 2002, the Chinese government blocked access to the entire mit.edu domain.

In 2004, to circumvent the block in place in Chinableh, a self-censored branch mitbbs.cn was opened to facilitate access by web users in China.

As of 2019, 51% of their internet traffic was generated from within the US.

In July 2022, MIT BBS ceased operations. Other similar websites such as openmitbbs.com, 1point3acres.com, mitbbs.app, huaren.us, newmitbbs.com, wenxuecity.com, 6park.com, wmkj.org, usmitbbs.com, weiming.info, freeblueplanet.com and freemitbbs.com emerged.

== Administration ==
After moving out of mit.edu, it was then managed by a company located in Beijing, China. Under the current administrator walklooktalk, in the last several years it saw accelerated commercialization, with more prominent space reserved for advertisers, as well as the creation of a spin-off website devoted to personal advertisement.
