= Gentlemint =

Social networking site

- Website type: Visual discovery, collection, networking
- Available in: English
- Headquarters: Lawrence, Kansas, United States
- Owners: Brian McKinney and Glen Stansberry
- Website: gentlemint.com
- Registration: Required
- Launched: November 26, 2011
- Current status: Defunct

Gentlemint is a social networking site for sharing links, photos and videos. Registration is required for use. The site was founded by Brian McKinney and Glen Stansberry, and is managed by Brisky Business LLC.

Gentlemint is centered on the idea of finding, sharing and collecting "manly" content. Manliness is not strictly defined, but is defined by the community itself. Gentlemint has often been cited as "Pinterest for Men", but the co-founders have said that unlike Pinterest, Gentlemint is only focused on a certain subset of content.

== Use ==
Gentlemint is a free website that requires registration to use, although registration is not limited exclusively to men. Members are able to upload links to content—known as "tacks"—through collections. These can also incorporate media such as photos, videos, and other content. In an interview in Forbes the Gentlemint co-founders clearly stated that Gentlemint does not allow nudity or objectionable content on the website. Gentlemint is often referred to as a "Pinterest for men", but the co-founders believe they're more of a compliment to Pinterest than a direct competitor, focusing only on manly content.

== History ==
Gentlemint was started as a "hack day" project on November 26, 2011, where McKinney and Stansberry worked for 12 hours on the concept before releasing the website later that night. Nearly two months later an article on Daily Dot gave the site its first media coverage. The site has later received mainstream media coverage from Fox News, Time, Mashable, and many others

== Awards ==
Gentlemint was included in PC Magazine's Top 100 Websites of 2012
