= Tea Party Community =

Social networking and political networking website

- Screenshot First logo when the site launched (now outdated).
- Website type: Social networking service
- Creators: Tim Selaty Sr., Founder – CEO; Tim Selaty Jr., Founder – CTO; Michelle Selaty, Founder – CFO
- Website: teapartycommunity.com
- Registration: Required
- Users: 153,902
- Launched: February 2, 2013
- Current status: Defunct

The Tea Party Community was a social networking and political networking website intended as an alternative to Facebook for use by American conservatives, founded by Ken Crow, Tim Selaty Sr. and Tim Selaty Jr. in November 2012 and launching on February 2, 2013.

== History ==
In January 2013, Crow accused Facebook of intentionally targeting conservative members for censorship and described the new site as "a new home for conservatives and the Tea Party movement in America", which could help to facilitate "the organizational process" of the movement. The Tea Party Community is aesthetically similar to Facebook, which Crow described as intentional. As of February 1, 2013, it had drawn over 50,000 members. The site is now defunct.
