= Foodie.fm =

Defunct Finnish online shopping service

- Website type: Online shopping
- Available in: English
- Website: www.foodie.fm
- Commercial: Yes
- Registration: Yes
- Launched: 2009
- Current status: Defunct in 2022

Foodie.fm was an online shopping service that incorporated grocery shopping and recipe discovery into a social context. The service was available on the web and for a mobile device and could be downloaded for IPhone, Nokia, Android or as a Facebook application. Foodie.fm was referred to as the Facebook for groceries, and described as enabling smart grocery shopping since users personalize their information to receive product and recipe recommendations. Referred to as 'social eatworking' and forecasted as a trend for 2012, users posted and shared shopping ideas, recipes and recommendations with other users on the service.

In June 2022, the Foodie.fi app was shut down, as the S Group replaced it with the S-kaupat app and the S-kaupat.fi website.

== Content ==
The application functioned by recommending recipes and suggesting groceries for the user to buy based on specified preferences. Users could also connect to other users and family members to plan cooking and grocery shopping together by sharing shopping lists. The service was connected to all of the stores in a given grocery chain and connected users to their local store and product inventory. In the United Kingdom, the Foodie.fm product assortment was linked to Tesco through public Tesco API where users could check-out with Tesco.com. In Finland, the company had a cooperation with S Group which is one of the largest retail chains of the Nordic countries with reportedly 44% market share in Finland.

== History ==
Founded by Kalle Koutajoki, Samuli Mattila, Lauri Arte and Arto Lukkarila in 2009, the service was available in Finland and the United Kingdom as beta. The company was based in Finland but formally launched internationally at Le Web conference in December 2011. As a business model, the company provided a one-to-one channel (personalized marketing) between the retailer and the consumer.

In an interview with CEO Kalle Koutajoki, he emphasized that Foodie.fm was created with internationalization in mind, and that the UK service would have more features such as crowdsourcing and revised commenting to make the service even more personal.

== Technology ==
Foodie.fm's recommendation system relied on a patent-pending technology which learned from a user's eating and buying habits and suggested groceries and recipes accordingly. The system also took into account user profile settings which specified food allergies, personal budget and dietary restrictions.
