= EConozco =

Spanish language social networking service

eConozco
- Website type: Social networking service
- Available in: Spanish
- Commercial: Yes
- Users: 150,000
- Launched: 2003; 23 years ago
- Current status: Offline

eConozco was a Spanish language social networking service aimed at professionals in Spain.

== History ==
Launched in 2003, the site had more than 100,000 users in August 2006.

eConozco would be acquired by XING in 2007 and folded two years later.
