= MetroMates =

- Website type: Social networking service
- Owner: Sameer Suri

MetroMates was an Indian social networking service that allowed train commuters to interact with fellow commuters. Launched in New Delhi on Valentine's Day in 2011 for Delhi Metro commuters, MetroMates became available for the Bangalore Metro and Kolkata Metro. MetroMates allowed commuters to share their travel schedule online with others and thus find a mate or travel partner to commute with every day. MetroMates was founded by Sameer Suri after he was inspired by watching the movie The Social Network, featuring real-life story behind formation of Facebook.
