= Natter (social network) =

Social network

- Website type: Social Network
- Launched: November 2014

Natter was a social network, often referred to as a "microblogging" or even "micro-microblogging" platform. Natter allowed its users or “natterers” to post up to 100 characters and an image in each post, which could then be seen by any online users.

Natter was first launched in 2014 as a website at natter.com, and later launched apps for both iOS and Android. Originally, each post could only contain up to three words and a hashtag.

On Friday, July 29, 2016, Natter ceased operations, due to competition, as well as a lack of funds.

In February 2017 Natter relaunched with a redesigned chat style app including direct messaging between users.

On September 6, 2018, Natter was shut down once again due to a steep decline in its userbase. Potential buyers of the software had approached Neil Stanley, the owner of Natter at the time, but ultimately backed out after too large a demand.

As of 2018, Natter's official website is defunct.

== Community ==
Since its relaunch, the Natter user base grew rapidly after receiving significant aid from posts made on other social media sites, such as Tumblr and Twitter. Natter has thus developed a tight-knit community to the extent that it has commonly been referred to as a family by regular users.

The community often put on role-playing events dubbed "god wars", in which users change their icons and adopt characterized personas. These events have resulted in the development of "Natter Lore" surrounding some users and the nature of the social media site.

Once Natter had been shut down, with none willing to purchase it, a Mastodon instance of the same name was created, prompting a significant portion of the community to migrate to it.
