= Kactoos =

Defunct social network service and group buying site

- Website type: Social network service
- Headquarters: Miami, Florida
- Registration: Not required
- Launched: October 2009
- Current status: Defunct

Kactoos is a defunct social network service and group buying site created by Kactoos Group and headquartered in Miami, Florida. Its slogan was "Shop together and save". Kactoos was available in Spanish and Portuguese.

The site was not an online store, but a group buying shopping platform that allows users to join groups in order to buy a particular item. The more users join a specific product's group, the lower will its price be.
