= Planet Cancer =

Defunct online community for young adults with cancer

Planet Cancer was an online community for young adults with cancer. The organization approached the disease with a sense of humor and included a "cancertainment" section with amusing essays including "Top 10 Signs You've Joined a Cheap HMO."

Planet Cancer was founded by Heidi Schultz Adams, a young adult cancer survivor who was diagnosed at 26 with Ewing's sarcoma, to help young adult cancer patients overcome isolation and connect with other cancer survivors in their age group. It was acquired by the Lance Armstrong Foundation in 2009.
