= Nettby =

Social networking websites

Nettby.no (Norwegian: Web City) was the second largest Internet-based community in Norway (after Facebook) with more than 980,000 users and profiles (as of January 3, 2009). It was founded on September 14, 2006, and was fully owned by VG Multimedia AS, a Norwegian news company, and Nettby Community Holding AS. Users used nicknames (such as FinKat) instead of their real names. Users' profiles were visible to all other users. "Communities" on Nettby are linked to the city (or other geographical unit, such as a town or village) that the user claimed as his or her current residence. Trondheim was the largest community, with over 36,000 "inhabitants".

The community closed on 19 December 2010.
