= Lifeknot =

Defunct social networking site

LifeKnot
- Website type: Social network service
- Owner: LifeKnot LLC.
- Creator: Matt Muro
- Website: www.lifeknot.com
- Registration: Required
- Current status: Inactive

LifeKnot was a social networking website with a focus on shared interests and hobbies. It was founded in November 2003 by Andrian A. Campania, is based in Cambridge, MA and is privately owned.

The site has been noted twice in The Sunday Times, Get clicking with a like-minded stranger, Social whirl online; the Gothamist, LifeKnot: The New Online Meeting Place; the Denver Post, Internet hookups lead to recreation - and romance; and the Boston Herald.

== Features ==
Members create activity profiles listing their favorite activities and hobbies, in addition to optionally creating a personal profile common to online dating web sites.

Members may perform searches for people that share their interests. LifeKnot can compare members' interests to show members those with whom they share the most in common.

Popular activities on LifeKnot include hiking, mountain biking, camping, star gazing, sushi, photography and frisbee.
