= MyVetwork =

Online community serving the US military

- Founded: 2008
- CEO and Founder: John R. Campbell
- Senior Advisor: Susan W. Bird

MyVetwork is an online community serving all members of the U.S. military — whether active duty, veteran or retired, and regardless of age or conflict — as well as their spouses, families and supporters. It was founded in 2008 by a group led by John R. Campbell, a decorated veteran Marine officer.

== Objectives ==
Using a proprietary algorithmic process, MyVetwork provides service members and those who care about them with a means to connect with and support each other in ways that range from the lighthearted and entertaining to deep and meaningful connections. In the process, it is building an information exchange where veterans of earlier conflicts can provide information, career advice, mentoring and other work-related resources to recently separated vets transitioning from the military experience to civilian work or education. MyVetwork is also able to apply its profiling and matching capability to connect veterans with appropriate civilian jobs.

== Heroes at Home ==
In 2009, MyVetwork partnered with Sears, for their Heroes at Home Campaign which raised over 6.5 million dollar in gift card donations for the Nation's military. Heroes at Home is a program Sears Holdings has created in response to an urgent need to assist military families facing hardship.

== Miscellaneous ==
MyVetwork is a 501(c)(3) not-for-profit organization and makes its community available to members at no cost.
