= Mivasocial =

Social network platform

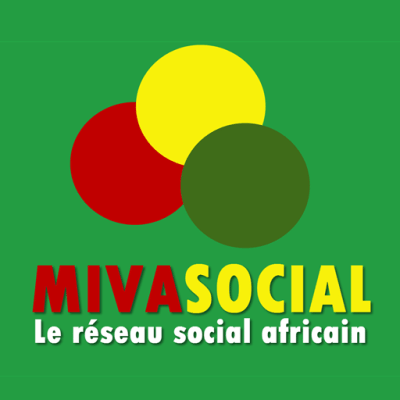
Logo of Mivasocial

Mivasocial is a website and online social networking platform for African communities around the world. The term Miva comes from the Ewe/Mina/Guin language of Togo and means "Come". Mivasocial therefore means "Come socialize".

Opened in 2013, Mivasocial is owned by Happy Way LLC of Lawrenceville, Georgia, United States. According to its founders, Mivasocial has over 15,000,000 members as of 2021. In 2019 The platform has developed a new e-commerce tool called Mivashop to help african businesses create their online shops. Mivashop is currently limited to the Togolese market.

== Founding and history ==
Mivasocial was initially launched in 2011 by Jean-Marc Kouevidjin as Star53, a social network to help with the development of African people. According to Kouevidjin, Star53 meant that there were 53 African countries of stars that needed to be discovered.

After growing to more than 100,000 members in 2012, Star53 encountered some technology limitations and issues and needed to be redesigned. In 2013, the new platform, initially called Togosocial, was launched in beta. Kouevidjin wrote the initial PHP code. The target was members of the Togolese community.

In July 2015, the platform expanded to all of Africa under the name Mivasocial. There was one social network for Africa and individual social networks for each African country.

Mivasocial claims 250,000 accounts registered in three years. Its promoters hope to mobilize investments in the order of $1 million to $10 million to accelerate the growth of Mivasocial.

According to Kouevidjin's introductory poem that reveals his thinking at the time of the inception of the Mivasocial idea, It is all about the rise of the African child. Mivasocial aims to be the face of Africa in the world by promoting African values and human potential.

== Target audience and demography ==
Mivasocial targets the entire world and anyone can be a member. Its membership is free. Any individual or business targeting the African continent can use the platform as a gateway to every country on the continent. According to the latest membership data released in January 2016, the audience is predominantly African people in the diaspora and the continental Africa according to the latest membership data released in Jan 2016.

After registering to use the site, users will need to identify their target African country network and their primary language of choice. Two languages are currently offered such as French and English. Users can then create a user profile, add other users as "friends", follow members feeds, exchange private messages, post status updates and photos, share videos, write blogs, use various apps and receive notifications on platform activities and also when others update their profiles. Additionally, users may join common-interest user groups called PACs, organized by categories such as workplace, school or college, or other characteristics, and connect with people throughout Africa or by individual African countries or the diaspora. Also users can complain or block unpleasant people from interacting with them or from chatting with them in the dedicated Mivasocial Messenger App namely Mivachat. The platform appears to take privacy very seriously with privacy tools available under user profiles that allow users to hide themselves completely from any site interaction. No personal data such as phone number and address is required to use the platform.

Members of the platform can share and target a specific African country or the entire continent.

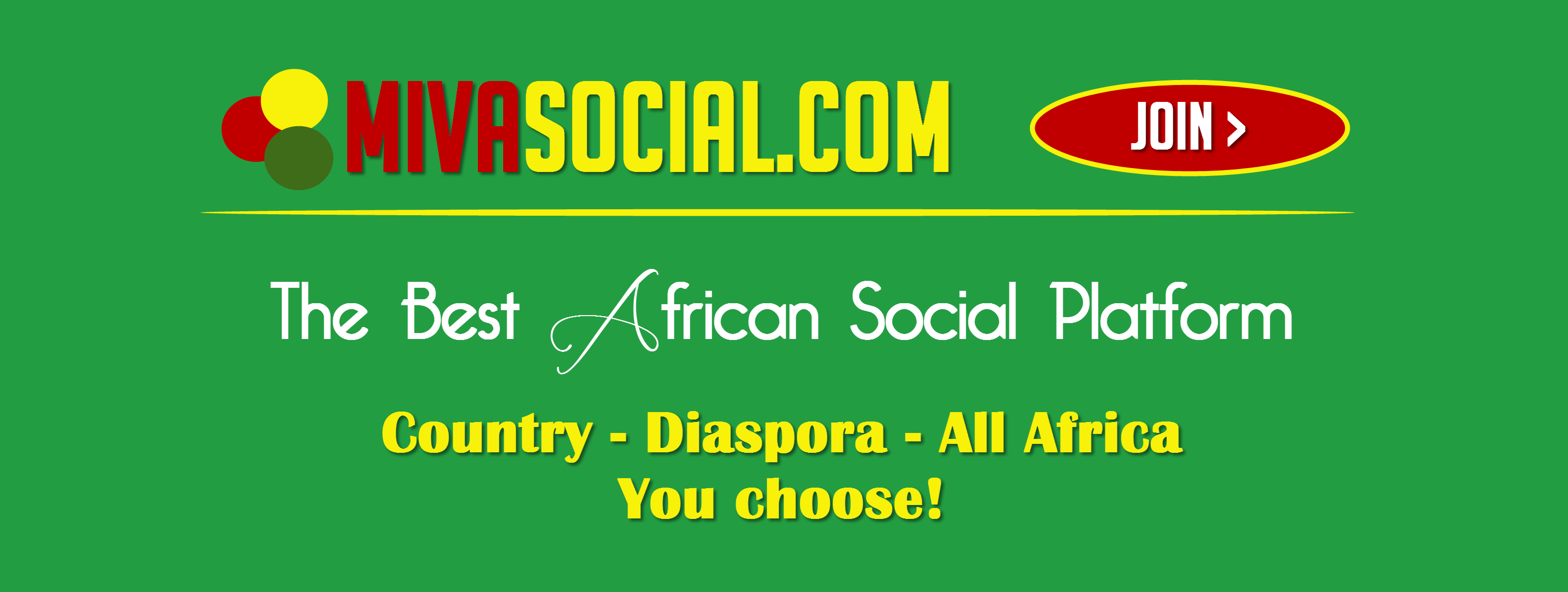
Mivasocial Banner

Reviews from Jeune Afrique of the Mivasocial points to the unique values that these tools represent to Africa, as well as the challenges facing the platform as it goes against giant players on the continent such as Facebook, Twitter, Jumia and others.

On January 23, 2017, Mivasocial launched officially in the Ivory Coast as Mivasocial Cote d'Ivoire.
