= FaceGlat =

Haredi Jewish social networking service

FaceGlat (Hebrew: פייסגלאט) was a social networking service by Yaakov Swisa. The website caters to Haredi Jews. The website separates users by sex and screens comments and advertisements to prevent indecency. The website currently is available in English and Hebrew. Swisa said that he plans to add French and Russian versions. Swisa said that he considered having a system where men and women who are members of the same family would be allowed to friend each other, but decided against it because he believed it would result in impersonations and individuals using false identities.
