= Netropolitan Club =

American social network

- Website type: Social networking service
- Available in: English
- Dissolved: November 2014
- Owner: James Touchi-Peters
- Creator: James Touchi-Peters
- Commercial: Yes
- Registration: Paid subscription required
- Launched: September 15, 2014
- Current status: Defunct

Netropolitan Club was a social network created by composer and performer James Touchi-Peters, which launched September 15, 2014, and shutdown in November of 2014. It was designed for use exclusively by wealthy people. The website has a sign-up fee of U$9.000,00 and an annual fee of U$3.000,00 for renewing one's membership.

== Shutdown after two months ==
After only approximately two months the site was deemed a failure.

== Distinguishing features ==
Touchi-Peters founded Netropolitan Club so that wealthy people could have a place to network with other wealthy people, and share their activities as well as discuss their first world problems without alienating poorer people or engendering a backlash. With this goal in mind, the Netropolitan Club had the following distinguishing features:

- High membership fees (U$9.000,00 to join, U$3.000,00 to renew annually), that served to automatically filter out people who are not wealthy.
- Members were required to be over 21 and to use their real names.
- There was no third-party advertising. Members were to be able to post in an upcoming Classified Ads system, but were not allowed to solicit from other members in private messages.
- The entire club was inaccessible to the public Internet. Efforts were made to enhance privacy and security, and names of members were not revealed to the outside world.
- Activity was monitored to protect members from abuse or unpleasant situations, and there were Member Services Associates available online to help members at any time.

== Media coverage ==
Netropolitan Club has been covered in International Business Times, the Los Angeles Times, the Express Tribune, NPR, Inc., and the Huffington Post. A CNN commented that it sounded like "an elaborate ruse in an age when Facebook, Twitter and a host of other social networks are free".
