= Capazoo =

Former social network

- Website type: Social networking service
- Available in: English, French
- Owner: Capazoo
- Creator: Michel VervilleLuc Verville
- Commercial: Yes
- Registration: Required
- Launched: November 2006
- Current status: Defunct

Capazoo was a social network and entertainment web site which allowed its members to add friends, write blogs, share music, photos, and videos. Capazoo was co-founded by two brothers, Michel Verville and Luc Verville in Montreal, Quebec and was launched for the first time in November 2006. Capazoo shut down for a period of time in the middle of 2007. Four months after Capazoo relaunched in October 2007 the co-founders sued each other in court due to the alleged corruption that was in the company.

== Site features ==
Capazoo had a multi-lingual user interface which gave visitors and members the choice between English and French.

Members of Capazoo were able to search for other members and add them as friends. Friends could send messages to each other via an internal messaging system. Capazoo also provided blogging, photo, video, and music upload services.

One of Capazoo's unique features was the creation of its own online currency called Zoops. Members are able to give other members Zoops for their videos, photos, music, blogs and profiles. Each Zoop was worth $0.01 U.S. Capazoo provided their subscribed members with a debit card enabling them to turn their accumulated Zoops into usable currency. Capazoo also had a referral program that let members earn Zoops by referring new members to the site.

On March 13, 2008 at 9 am EST, Capazoo Executives had a meeting where it was decided that they would lay off their entire staff because of unresolved legal issues with the co-founders.

Ultimately, the company has become bankrupt and ceased all operations.

== Partnerships ==
On December 18, 2007 National Lampoon Inc joined in a partnership with Capazoo. National Lampoon acquired an equity stake in Capazoo. All of National Lampoons internet content will be available on Capazoo. As well, Capazoo agreed to sponsor a series of live stand-up comedy acts.

Capazoo had a partnership in place with ComedyNet to add exclusive content to Capazoo.

Iovation was contracted to handle fraud management and security services.

Capazoo also entered into a $5 million, three-year agreement with Savvis for web hosting services, but received criticism about making such a move.
