= Poparazzi =

Defunct social networking app

- Website type: Social network service
- Available in: English
- Headquarters: Marina del Rey, California
- Owner: TTYL Inc.
- CEO: Alex Ma
- Registration: Yes
- Launched: May 24, 2021; 5 years ago
- Current status: Discontinued June 30, 2023

Poparazzi was an American social networking and photo-sharing app developed by TTYL Inc., first launched on May 24, 2021. After initial viral success sent the platform to the top of the App Store charts, the app would experience a steady slowdown in growth which lead to the app's eventual closure on June 20, 2026.

== Features ==
Poparazzi restricted the use of the front-facing camera, restricting users from uploading selfies to the platform. Users could choose which uploads from their friends appeared on their profile or restrict who was able to tag them in photos. Likes and follower counts were hidden from profiles and the service did not allow users to leave comments on posts.

The app automatically followed all contacts in a person's phone upon sign-up, which raised privacy concerns from some users.

== History ==
TTYL Inc was co-founded by Alex and Austin Ma. The pair had released other social media apps previously, and were able to raise $2 million in investment funding in 2018 which supported the development of Poparazzi. The company used TikTok and an open TestFlight beta to generate initial interest, boosting preorders and creating high demand at launch.

In June 2022, TTYL was able to secure $15 million in Series A funding and shared that the app had reached 5 million downloads. In August, TTYL unveiled a new app called Made With Friends, which was similar in concept to Poparazzi with support for additional kinds of content.

On May 1, 2023, TTYL announced that the app would be discontinued, with users having until June 20 to download their photos. Shortly after, the core team behind Poparazzi including CEO Alex Ma were hired by Meta Platforms.
