= Zoopy =

Online and mobile social media community

- Website type: Private
- Founded: 2006; 20 years ago
- Dissolved: 2012; 14 years ago
- Headquarters: Cape Town, South Africa
- Key people: Jason Elk, Founder & CEO; Gerry da Silva, Sales Director; Pat Elk, Co-Founder & Operations Director
- Website: www.zoopy.com

Zoopy was an online and mobile social media community, hosting user generated videos, photos and audio.

== History ==
Zoopy launched into closed beta in late 2006 and moved into live beta with public access on March 5, 2007.

In December 2007, Nokia selected Zoopy as its regional imaging partner for South and West Africa.

On June 26, 2008, Vodacom purchased a 40% share stake in Zoopy and increased its stake to 75% in February 2009, and acquired the remainder of the company in August 2010.

On February 1, 2011, Zoopy repositioned itself as a mobile video entertainment platform, delivering videos of the latest news, sport and entertainment in 90 seconds or less.

In July 2012, Zoopy Founder and CEO Jason Elk as well as co-founder and Operations Director Pat Elk left the company following the news that Vodacom was planning to sell a significant stake in Zoopy.

The platform briefly updated in November 2012 before shutting down in December 2012.
