= Foodily.com =

- Website type: Recipe search engine and social network service
- Headquarters: San Francisco, California
- Website: foodily.com
- Registration: Optional

Foodily.com was a social networking platform built on top of a recipe search engine. It offered a way to search for and find and share recipes through social media as well as from other web sites. However, it is no longer possible to search for recipes, and the site simply gives the notice that the system is unavailable.

== History ==
Foodily.com was co-founded by former Yahoo! veterans. It was launched as a web service on February 1, 2011. In November 2011, Foodily went mobile with the launch of its free iPhone app. Foodily was acquired by IAC-owned social network [Ask.fm] in 2015.

== Awards ==
In 2012, Foodily.com won the Webby Award for the best food and beverage site.

== See also ==
- Social networking service
- List of social networking websites
