= Boredat =

Internet message board

- Website type: Anonymous message board
- Available in: English
- Dissolved: 2016
- Owner: Jonathan Pappas
- Creator: Jonathan Pappas
- Website: www.boredat.com
- Commercial: No
- Registration: Required
- Launched: 2006
- Current status: Defunct

Boredat (often stylized as bored@, board@ or b@) was a pseudo-anonymous message board created by Columbia University graduate Jonathan Pappas in 2006. It shut down at the end of 2016.

== History ==
The first version of Bored@ was created for Columbia students and was called "bored@butler". The name was taken from Columbia's Butler Library, and only people with an e-mail address with the columbia.edu domain name could sign up. While technically available to faculty, bored@ was almost exclusively used by students. The board remained completely anonymous. Users could post anything they wanted and could interact with other posts with "agree," "disagree," and "newsworthy" voting options, or by replying to the posts themselves. By 2007, Bored@ had individual communities at most of the Ivy League schools, all named after their respective libraries.

Bored@ went completely offline for much of 2009 until being relaunched in October of that year to great success. Users were able to create "personalities" to tie to their posts. These handles were intended to remain anonymous while allowing users to keep track of each other's posts. Anonymous posting was still allowed and common. Moderators assigned by Pappas could also vote to remove posts deemed in violation of the site's rules.

Eventually, Pappas allowed any school to create their own board. Any student who created an account on boredat.com with a new email address could create a board for their school. These communities were named after the schools themselves rather than their libraries. Carleton College is the only school to have a consistently growing board that was not directly created by Pappas. Carleton's board was created in 2013, and Pappas saw potential in it. Carleton's student population is roughly 2,000, and Pappas thought small communities allowed for healthier boards. Carleton's users began to host parties for users of the website, and a small subculture began to develop. Different schools' users could interact with one another on the "Global Board." By 2014, the three most active boards belonged to Dartmouth College, Columbia, and Carleton. Grinnell College and Harvard University also had small active communities.

== Controversy ==
Dartmouth's community, Bored at Baker, saw an influx of hostile posts, including rape and death threats towards certain students in April 2013. In 2014, a "guide" on how to rape a specific member of the Dartmouth class of 2017 was posted, the target of which stating later that she had been raped as a result. Threats were also made towards a Dartmouth alumna. Students speculated that the website allowed for brazen comments that students would not make were they not anonymous.

=== Decline ===
In 2014, Pappas acknowledged that bored@ was not self-sustaining and introduced ads to the website. An option to directly donate to server costs was also available. These saw use for a short time, but in 2015, ads were removed from the website. Dartmouth's board was shut down with little warning in October 2015, but the Global Board remained available to them. Pappas began to see Bored@ as a side project and said the Dartmouth board was too time-consuming. Users began to think the website was too loosely moderated and controversial to remain popular, particularly with the rising popularity of Yik Yak as a similar social media outlet. On December 1, 2016, Pappas announced that bored@ would be shutting down indefinitely at the end of the year due to expenses becoming too much for him to handle on his own. Despite receiving a number of donations via Patreon, the site shut down on December 31.

== Website ==
=== Mechanics ===
Bored@ featured personalities and a point system. Users had a point total associated with their personality, and a separate total associated with their account. Personalities with the most points were ranked on the "Zeitgeist," and the personality with the single highest total gained the title of "Network Leader." This title can be held by any personality. Users received 5 points for getting an agree, disagree, or newsworthy vote, 5 points when somebody visited their profile, 2 points when they received direct messages, 1 point for other users clicking on a link they shared, and 15 points for receiving a reply to a post. Users could receive badges for achieving certain milestones as well. Making a certain number of posts, receiving large numbers of agrees or disagrees, having high point totals, or logging in on certain holidays all warranted badges.

Users could choose to post identifying information with their personalities or to keep them completely secret. Moderators generally removed specific mentions of names or well-known events. If a user so chose, they could also go into "rehab," which locked them out of their account for a set amount of time. 2 hour and 24 hour rehab programs were the only options until early 2016, when options for 5 day, 15 day, 30 day, 3 month, and 1 year rehabs were added. Going into rehab also awarded the user points.

Posts receiving a high number of agrees or disagrees make it onto the "Week's Best" and "Week's Worst" sections on the website. "Today's Top Headlines" contained posts receiving the most newsworthy votes every 24 hours.

Users could check into different locations on campus to designate that they were posting from that location. The check-in options included real places (academic and residential buildings) and fake places (such as "the void") and were unique to each school's board. Personalities became the "mayor" of a location once they made more posts than anybody else from that place.

=== Rules ===
Pappas aimed to preserve anonymity, but acknowledged the issues that came with it. Abusive or identifying posts towards other users were prohibited, and users were encouraged to report such posts so moderators could remove them. Pappas reserved the power to restore wrongfully removed posts if need be. Posts threatening acts of violence were also prohibited. Sexually explicit links were allowed as long as they came with a warning.
