= Pebble (social network) =

American social media platform

- Company type: Private
- Industry: internet, social media
- Founded: November 2022
- Founder: Sarah Oh and Gabor Cselle
- Defunct: November 1, 2023
- Website: pebble.is (defunct) pebble.social (successor)

Pebble (formerly T2) was an American social media platform founded by former Twitter employees Sarah Oh and Gabor Cselle. It provided an authenticated network where users could make posts and interact in communities before shutting down on 1 November 2023.

One day before the shutdown, Cselle launched a Mastodon instance of the same name. It closely resembles the look and feel of the old site.

== Background ==
Prior to founding T2, Cselle oversaw the incubation of new consumer products in Google’s since-shuttered Area 120 incubator. Cselle had also been a Group Product Manager at Twitter from 2014 to 2016, where he worked on the consumer product, and relaunched Twitter’s logged-out homepage and mobile trends. Sarah Oh had previously worked as an executive in Trust and Safety at Twitter and Facebook. On the day Oh was laid off from twitter, Cselle called her to offer his condolences, and to offer Oh a position at T2 to aid in creating a new social media platform.

Cselle announced the development of T2 in November 2022.

In early 2023, T2 hired former Discord Senior Director of Engineering Michael Greer as its chief technology officer.

On 15 September 2023, the platform was rebranded as Pebble.

On 24 October 2023, the platform announced its shutdown on 1 November 2023, approximately one year since it started.

On 30 October 2023, Cselle launched the mastodon-instance pebble.social.

== Platform ==
Pebble was one of several social media platforms conceived as an alternative to X (formerly Twitter) after its takeover by Elon Musk. The platform allowed 280 characters on user posts. Cselle expressed a desire to keep the platform as similar to the original Twitter platform as possible. It also emphasized security and safety features such as user authentication.

Pebble's moderation was planned to make use of both human review and artificial intelligence features.

On 25 April 2023, the platform's invite system launched, allowing its current community of around 1,000 users to invite their friends to the service instead of requiring users to join a waitlist. Each member of the platform was allowed up to 5 invites with the ability to request more invites if required. The platform was a web-based app only.

Pebble offered checkmark verification, similar to X. Verification was done through Persona and a $5 charge is invoiced to offset the cost of verification. Unlike rival X Blue, the payment is one-time.
