= Viddy (app) =

Former mobile social-video application

- Developers: Viddy, Inc.
- Release: 2011
- Operating system: iOS, Android
- Type: Social video
- License: Proprietary

Viddy was a mobile social-video application that allowed users to record, edit and share short videos. Founded in Los Angeles in 2011 by Brett O'Brien and JJ Aguhob, the service was frequently described as an "Instagram for video" and competed with services including Socialcam.

Viddy experienced rapid growth in 2012 after integrating with Facebook's social platform, reporting tens of millions of registered users and raising $30 million in a financing round that valued the company at approximately $370 million. Its traffic subsequently fell sharply. The company rebranded as Supernova in 2013 and was acquired by Fullscreen in January 2014. Viddy was discontinued in December 2014.

== History ==
=== Launch and product ===
O'Brien and Aguhob co-founded Viddy in 2011 with the aim of making it easier to record, edit and distribute short videos from a mobile phone. The original application was released for iOS and limited recordings to 15 seconds. Users could apply visual filters and music before sharing videos through Viddy's network or services such as Facebook, Twitter and YouTube.

The service attracted partnerships with entertainers and media companies. The Los Angeles Times reported partnerships involving Snoop Dogg, Linkin Park, Incubus and Disney. Other prominent users and investors associated with the application included Justin Bieber, Shakira, Will Smith and Roc Nation.

=== Growth and financing ===
Viddy raised a $6 million Series A round in February 2012 from investors including Battery Ventures, Greycroft Ventures, Qualcomm and Bessemer Venture Partners.

After Viddy integrated with Facebook Timeline, its application became the most-downloaded free iPhone app in April 2012. The company reported more than 27 million registered users by May 2012. That month it raised an additional $30 million from investors including New Enterprise Associates, Goldman Sachs and Khosla Ventures, at a reported valuation of approximately $370 million. The funding and rapid adoption led to comparisons with Instagram, which Facebook had agreed to acquire the previous month.

The company's executives included chief marketing officer Evan White, who represented Viddy at the 2012 South by Southwest festival and spoke to the Los Angeles Times about the application and the Los Angeles technology community.

Viddy released an Android version in December 2012. At the time, the company reported 40 million registered users, although independent measurements indicated that daily usage had declined from its earlier peak. A February 2013 update increased the maximum video length from 15 to 30 seconds and added filters and discovery features.

=== Decline, acquisition and shutdown ===
Viddy's rapid Facebook-driven growth did not persist. Reporting by Wired and the Los Angeles Business Journal described a steep decline in daily activity after changes reduced the application's distribution through Facebook. Viddy also faced competition from Socialcam and, beginning in 2013, Twitter's short-video service Vine.

O'Brien left the chief executive position in February 2013 as the company reduced its staff. Later that year, the company returned a reported $18 million to investors, recapitalized, and adopted the name Supernova while developing additional mobile applications.

Fullscreen acquired Supernova in January 2014 for an undisclosed amount. In November, Fullscreen announced that Viddy had been removed from Apple's App Store and Google Play and would cease operating on December 15, 2014.

== See also ==
- Socialcam
- Vine (service)
- Instagram
- TikTok
