= Talkbiznow =

Business networking site

- Traded as: Required
- Industry: Business networking
- Founded: 2008
- Headquarters: San Francisco, California
- Area served: Worldwide
- Key people: Martin Warner, Chief Executive Officer, Mark Parker Executive Chairman
- Website: Talkbiznow.com

Talkbiznow was a business networking site that was founded in 2008 and launched in August 2008. The site was a web-based business community and collaboration tool that provided business services for small businesses and professionals. Talkbiznow has been featured in the San Francisco Chronicle, Design Week, Sky News, The Financial Times, The Guardian, Times Online, Forbes, Fox Business Network, and The Daily Telegraph.
