= Chictopia =

US-based online fashion site

- Website type: Social Commerce
- Creators: Helen Zhu, Corinne Chan, Richard Ho
- Website: www.chictopia.com
- Launched: 2008
- Current status: Inaccessible as of August 2025

Chictopia was an online fashion site based in San Francisco. The website was designed for fashion enthusiasts and bloggers to create profiles, post outfits, set up online shops, and socialize with others interested in fashion.

== History ==
Chictopia was founded by Helen Zhu, Corinne Chan, and Richard Ho in 2008. Zhu and Chan both attended University of California Berkeley, with Zhu graduating in mechanical engineering and Chan electrical engineering and computer science. Prior to Chictopia, Zhu worked for eight years in the web industry as a product manager, Chan as a software engineer and systems architect, and Ho as an integrated circuit designer.

== Brand partnership ==
In 2009, the clothing brand American Apparel featured several active Chictopia users as models as part of an ad campaign that ran on the site and elsewhere titled, "Our Friends from Chictopia." In 2011, Chictopia ran its first “Influential Blogger of the Year” competition featuring eight rising fashion bloggers. In 2013, Chictopia held a social shopping event with American Apparel and Crossroads Trading Co. called “Shop it Like it’s Hot” in the SoMa District of San Francisco.

== Overview ==
The website was designed for users interested in fashion and wanting to refine and showcase their style. Users uploaded outfit photos, described their physical traits, and connected to other users with similar body types, complexion, and style. Users could get an idea of how clothes would look on themselves and how to style them in a relatable way, as opposed to fashion models. Users could earn points for participating in the site, and redeem them against fashion items.

Zhu has said she wants Chictopia to be what YouTube has been for filmmakers and what Myspace has been for musicians.

Teen Vogue named Chictopia "The Next Big Thing" shortly after its founding. Nylon lists the website in its "Top 4 Style Sites." Women's Wear Daily named Chictopia “Top six sites to watch”, along with Polyvore, Foursquare, and three others in 2010.

The company held a conference for style bloggers in 2010.
