= MyMFB =

Muslim-oriented social networking website

- Company type: Privately held company
- Website type: Social network service
- Available in: English
- Founded: Pakistan
- Area served: Worldwide
- Founder: Omer Zaheer Meer
- Key people: Azhar Siddique
- Employees: 1
- Registration: Required
- Launched: May 2010
- Current status: Active

MyMFB (previously MillatFacebook) was a Muslim-oriented social networking website. It was launched in May 2010 in response to a controversial group on Facebook entitled Everybody Draw Mohammed Day and Pakistan's block of Facebook in response.

== History ==
On May 19, 2010, Lahore High Court banned Facebook from being accessed in Pakistan, after a user of the website created a page for Everybody Draw Mohammed Day, and Facebook did not remove the page despite complaints from users. The site attracted over 4,300 users, most of them Pakistani, in the first few days. This number was expected to grow further because of Pakistani Facebook users being unable to access Facebook as a result of the national ban on the site. On 30 May 2010, however, a Pakistani court ruled that the Pakistani government should restore access to Facebook.

The Urdu word "Millat" is used by Muslims to refer to their nation.

MyMFB has criticized Facebook for ignoring complaints from Muslim users, who MyMFB says provide almost 50% of Facebook's revenue. Chief Operating Officer Usman Zaheer said of Facebook that "We want to tell [the] Facebook people 'if they mess with us they have to face the consequences'. If someone commits blasphemy against our Prophet Mohammed then we will become his competitor and give him immense business loss[es]. [We dream of making] the largest Muslim social networking website."

Chief Executive Officer Omer Zaheer said that the site is open to "nice and decent people of all faiths", and that it encourages freedom of expression so long as users respect one another's sensitivities and faiths. Zaheer has said that Facebook "seems to allow mockery of religions it has an issue with… The caricatures of the Prophet Mohammed were uploaded, and instead of taking any consideration and action, they came out and said they were supporting it."

On 1 January 2013, The Express Tribune reported that the site had elicited funding requests to pay its server bills and may close down. The site later rebranded itself as MyMFB.

== Development ==
The web site describes itself as helping users to "connect and share with more than 1.57 billion Muslims and sweet people from other Religions." The site aims to become "the largest Muslim social networking website."

While additional features are under the works to make it similar to those of Facebook, it currently offers such similar features as a "Wall" and the ability to connect to "Friends."

The person involved in created the site was Azhar Siddique, an advocate. In 2012, the company's About page listed Omer Zaheer Meer as CEO and Founder and Arslan Ch as Design Lead. The founder said its employees are "working around the clock to offer features similar to those pioneered by the wildly popular California-based prototype." Usman Zaheer, the chief operating officer said "We want to tell [the] Facebook people [that] 'if they mess with us they have to face the consequences'. If someone commits blasphemy against our Prophet Mohammed then we will become his competitor and give him (sic) immense business loss."

== Reception ==
The Express Tribune, an affiliate of the International Herald Tribune, said "The quality of user experience is so abysmal that it does not merit the humble title, 'Facebook clone'. To sum up, MillatFacebook is a bold effort... but it is unlikely to capture a large audience, judging by the online experience it offers currently."
