= Edmodo =

Discontinued learning management system

- Screenshot of the Edmodo app running on an iPad
- Company type: Subsidiary
- Website type: Social learning network, Social learning tools, Networked learning
- Available in: Arabic, English, Croatian, Spanish, Portuguese, German, Greek, French, Italian, Turkish, Dutch, Chinese, Swedish, Indonesian
- Founded: September 1, 2008; 18 years ago
- Dissolved: September 22, 2022; 4 years ago
- Headquarters: San Mateo, California
- Area served: Worldwide
- Owner: NetDragon
- Creators: Nic Borg, Jeff O'Hara
- Industry: Education
- Services: Education technology
- Registration: Required
- Users: 87.4 million
- Current status: Discontinued

Edmodo was an educational technology platform for K–12 schools and teachers. Launched in 2008, it enabled teachers to share content, distribute quizzes and assignments, and manage communication with students, colleagues, and parents. The service was shut down on September 22, 2022.

== History ==
Edmodo.id was found by Nic Borg, Ed O'Neil, Jeff O'Hara, and Crystal Hutter in 2008. It was backed by Index Ventures, Benchmark, Greylock Partners, New Enterprise Associates, Union Square Ventures, Tenaya Capital, SingTel, and KDDI.

In 2013, Edmodo.id was included in the list of "The Top Apps for teachers" by PC Magazine. The same year, Edmodo acquired a startup, Root-1, in an effort to establish itself as the app store for education. Vibhu Mittal, co-founder and CEO of Root-1, became the CEO of Edmodo the following year.

In 2014, Edmodo launched Snapshot – a suite of assessment tools to measure student progress on educational standards. The company also partnered with Oxford University Press and Cambridge University Press to provide access to educational content on the Edmodo Platform and bring Edmodo Snapshot to the UK.

In January 2017, Edmodo launched professional development courses for teachers in the state of New York in conjunction with NYPTI. These included both a synchronous video classroom component as well as an asynchronous, text based discussion component.

On May 17, 2017, Edmodo sent an email informing users that it was the victim of a major hack of user information. 77 million users' data were breached, including usernames, hashed passwords and email addresses. Passwords were both hashed and salted using the bcrypt algorithm. There were no reports of any school data being affected, nor any identities compromised, according to an external audit commissioned by the company.

In June 2017, Edmodo announced Ask Mo, an educational video search engine. Ask Mo's search algorithm is based on videos that had been shared by teachers in the context of educational discussions and can be filtered by subject and grade level.

On April 8, 2018, Edmodo announced that it was being acquired by NetDragon for $137.5 million in cash and stock.

On August 15, 2022, Edmodo announced that the platform would be closed on September 22, 2022.

== Criticisms ==
The Federal Trade Commission on May 22, 2023 sued Edmodo, LLC for violation of the Children's Online Privacy Protection Act by collecting data on children without parental consent and "for unlawfully outsourcing its COPPA compliance responsibilities to schools." A penalty fine of $6 million USD was imposed, but would only have to be paid if Edmodo continued business in the United States. On June 28, 2023, in conjunction with the United States Attorney's Office for the Northern District of California, the FTC laid a permanent injunction on Edmodo, LLC. to not violate COPPA rulings, prevent the collection of any more data than was necessary, and to delete all data collected from students under 13 years of age.
