= Spire (social networking service) =

- Company type: Privately held company
- Website type: Social network service
- Available in: English
- Founded: Chattanooga, Tennessee
- Headquarters: Chattanooga, Tennessee
- Area served: Worldwide
- Founders: Ben Wagner; David Nielson; Michael Brooks Jr.
- Key people: Jay Kelley (CEO); Michael Brooks Jr. (Co-Founder & Chief Product Officer)
- Advertising: Referral marketing
- Registration: Required
- Users: Over 50,000
- Launched: January 11, 2011
- Current status: Inactive

Spire, formerly known as LifeKraze, was a web-based social networking service founded in April 2010. Members shared "real-world" personal accomplishments with their friends, and were rewarded by other members. Members awarded each other points for each accomplishment. Members used the points they've collected to buy rewards from brand partners.

Spire was founded by two Covenant College alumni, Ben Wagner and David Nielson, as the brainchild of their senior project in 2010. The site quickly developed into an expanding social media platform, gaining significant traction at South by Southwest in 2011. On October 29, 2013 the name was changed from LifeKraze to Spire. With these changes was an updated logo, colors, and minor changes to the website and apps.

The site's membership was open to the general public, and was associated with dozens of brands. Spire launched an iOS app on the App Store on July 24, 2012, and an Android app on the Google Play store on January 23, 2013.

== Purpose ==
Spire was founded to encourage and reward an active lifestyle among its members. It was intended as a tool to promote productive, healthy, active living through using social media. The company's mission was "to connect the world through healthy competition, to focus current passions and to inspire new exploration."

== Structure ==
When members sign up, they were encouraged to build their network of followers in a similar way to other social media like Facebook or Twitter. They then post their activities online in status updates, and then their followers reward them points as they see fit. These points can be redeemed for rewards from companies that encourage an active lifestyle (e.g. health food stores and outdoor equipment outfitters).

Members posted in two categories of status updates: accomplishments and thoughts. Accomplishments were intended to record a user's active lifestyle, and thus are eligible to receive points from followers. Thoughts however, are intended only to foster community among followers, and thus they are not eligible to receive points.

== Awards ==
In 2011, LifeKraze was recognized by Entrepreneur Magazine as one of the 100 Brilliant Companies of the year. In 2012, LifeKraze was recognized by CNN as one of the "10 Great Mobile Health Apps"
