= Goodwizz =

- Company type: Private
- Website type: Online dating service, Social network service
- Available in: English, French, Chinese, German, Arab, Spanish, Portuguese
- Founded: 2010
- Headquarters: Paris, France
- Key people: Emmanuel Cassimatis, Founder
- Website: www.goodwizz.com
- Advertising: Banner ads, contextual ads, sponsorships
- Registration: Required
- Users: 110,000 (September 2011) Unique Visitors
- Launched: September 2010
- Current status: Defunct

Goodwizz was a social network service website based in France. Users had an option to use their Facebook credentials to sign up and log on to Goodwizz.

Goodwizz explored new horizons in social network, with advanced approach in building social ties. It defined itself as a social network, with games, and a meeting section in four steps: matchmaking algorithm, discovery questions, personality games and meeting location suggestions.

== History ==
In September 2010 Emmanuel Cassimatis started and gathered 60,000 members in its first 6 months of existence.

Goodwizz was a result from a market study with the cooperation of 200 people. The outcome is that most people find it hard to connect and get to know people online. The study was able to find ways on how to connect to other users by means of genuine connections.

Originally launched with a matchmaking algorithm and personality games developed with psychologists.

On June 6, 2011, Goodwizz founder Emmanuel Cassimatis made a statement on BBC News regarding the banning of French TV and radio presenters from mentioning social networking sites such as Facebook and Twitter on air.

"It is about finding a balance between freedom and fairness, each company should have the right to say which communication channel they want to use. But 10 or 20 years down the line, we may have a string of lobbies created through those three or four channels that prevent small companies like ours from emerging. This move prevents that."

Today, Goodwizz extended steadily the range of proposed functionalities, focusing on guidance, evolving to a meeting management platform offering meeting-oriented tools.

== Features ==
Like most social networking service, Goodwizz allow users to post and upload pictures and videos, share thoughts and comments on a wall, invite friends, and send them virtual gifts. It developed a unique matchmaking system that suggests particular users to members with common interests and compatible personal feature.

It has its own personality games and external games from Facebook. Meeting services that focuses on guidance and coaching based on personality plays is also an attraction.

Applications that provide service like online radio, classifieds, photo editing, psychic services and many others.

Goodwizz also offers a mobile phone version of its website.

== See also ==
- List of Social Networking Websites
