= MyLife =

Online information broker

MyLife.com
- Type: Information broker
- Founded: 2002; 24 years ago (as Reunion.com)
- Headquarters: Los Angeles, California, U.S.
- Key people: Jeff Tinsley (CEO)
- Owner: Privately held
- Website: www.MyLife.com

MyLife is an American information brokerage firm. Founded by Jeffrey Tinsley in 2002 as Reunion.com, it changed names following a 2008 merger with Wink.com. MyLife gathers personal information through public records and other sources to automatically generate a "MyLife Public Page" for each person. These pages can list a variety of personal information, including an individual's age, past and current home addresses, phone numbers, email addresses, employers, education, photographs, relatives, political affiliations, a mini-biography.

MyLife public pages include personal review sections, which encourages other MyLife members to rate each other. The site also allows people to search for any person in the United States, read their auto-generated public page, and review it. The company claimed in 2019 to provide public background data on over 325 million identities.

== History ==
In 2007, MyLife.com received $25 million in venture funding from Oak Investment Partners. The company changed its name from Reunion.com to MyLife.com after merging with the search engine company, Wink, in the fall of 2008. According to Tinsley, the company's 2008 revenue was estimated at 52 million dollars with 90% of the firm's revenue coming from paid subscriptions.

In August 2007, MyLife described its website as the sixth most popular social networking site with 28 million users, while a 2008 article in the Los Angeles Times criticized the company's "aggressive marketing approach." In February 2009 ComScore reported the company's website as having 18.2 million unique visitors that month, and Tech Crunch said it was the fourth-largest social networking website in January 2009.

As of 2009, the company had acquired several smaller companies including Planet Alumni, GoodContacts, HighSchoolAlumni, and MyAddressBook.com. In 2009, Ancestry.com began a data sharing partnership with MyLife.

== Legal issues ==
=== 2011 class action lawsuit and State of Washington scrutiny ===
In 2011, a lawsuit against MyLife said the company was engaging in false advertising practices, similar to what was alleged in a 2008 Classmates.com class-action lawsuit. The suit also accused the MyLife of false solicitation by offering monthly memberships and then charging member's credit cards at the annual rate. The class action accused MyLife of spamming contacts improperly gathered from the address books of those visiting the site. U.S. District Judge Claudia Wilken's ruling consolidated the 2011 class-action lawsuit with two other fraud class actions against MyLife. The lawsuit was ultimately dismissed.

The Washington State Attorney General's Office began an investigation in 2011 stemming from concerns that the company's TV advertisements may have violated the state's Consumer Protection Act, which prohibits unfair and deceptive practice. According to state officials, the company resolved the issue by making an "assurance of discontinuance" and paid $28,000 in attorneys' costs and fees.

=== 2015 lawsuit in California ===
In 2015, after a joint investigation by the Santa Monica City Attorney's Office and the Los Angeles County District Attorney's Office, the company was again sued, this time for allegedly violating California anti-spam laws. Investigators found that MyLife was tricking consumers into giving the company their personal identifying information, and later their money, through false and misleading ads.

MyLife agreed to a court judgment under which it would pay $800,000 in penalties, plus $250,000 in refunds to customers, a ruling referred to as "the first major prosecution of an online business for violations of California's automatic renewal law". The company also is subject to a permanent injunction that prohibits false advertising and unauthorized credit card charges.

=== 2020 DOJ lawsuit ===
In July 2020, the U.S. Department of Justice, on behalf of the Federal Trade Commission (FTC), filed a lawsuit against MyLife and Tinsley. In the complaint the company is alleged to have violated the Fair Credit Reporting Act (FCRA) and used misleading billing and marketing practices. Additionally, the lawsuit mentions that the company deceived consumers with "teaser background reports" which made false claims of information about arrest, criminal, and sex offender records.

In October 2021, a judge issued a summary judgement ruling that MyLife engaged in deceptive acts, as well as violating the Telemarketing Sales Rule and the Restore Online Shoppers’ Confidence Act (ROSCA). However, the judge denied the FCRA claim as well as any claim that Tinsley was individually liable. The company was also banned from engaging in negative option billing as well as implying that someone who has received a traffic violation has a criminal record.

As a result, the court awarded $34 million in consumer reparations. However, due to the MyLife's financial position and inability to pay, Tinsley will pay $5 million and MyLife $16 million.

== Ratings and reviews ==
The Better Business Bureau (BBB) rates MyLife as a 'F' with no accreditation as of January 2025. Formerly, the BBB revoked MyLife's accreditation, initially giving MyLife a rating of D, and later an F. From 2018 to 2020, the BBB received almost 14,000 complaints about MyLife.

== Privacy concerns ==
A key criticism of MyLife relates to being mentioned as the "worst offender" among data brokers for difficulty of "opting out", and for using scare tactics, such as noting "you have criminal or arrest records" to convince people to sign up for a membership to see results. Data brokerage services have long been criticized for profiting off the exploitation of personal data.
