= Yookos =

Nigerian online social networking service

- Industry: Social networking service
- Founded: January 2011; 15 years ago

Yookos is an online social networking service founded in 2011 by the leader of Christ Embassy International. It was initially used by church members, but later the site was expanded to allow public access. The site received more than half of its traffic from Nigeria and the remaining user base was from Zimbabwe, South Africa, the UK and the US.

In May 2012, it was listed among the Top African Social Networks by IT News Africa.

In January 2013, Yookos partnered with Adfu to increase its market reach and push revenue earnings. This collaboration makes Yookos available across Africa with Adfu as exclusive advertising sales agent. ad-ops team.

== History ==
The site launched as an individual entity in January 2011. Yookos was initially a Christian-focused site, established with the aim of conveying spiritual messages among members of Christ Embassy. The site penetrated beyond Africa as traffic steadily increased. Though leaders at the church form a majority of the site's members, an improved platform has made it available to anyone around the world.

== Features ==
=== User profile ===
Yookos enabled users to meet with friends across the globe, play games online and stay updated with global news. Users can create profiles, post status updates and blogs, start a discussion or poll, share event details, upload a document or a picture or a video. They can also connect with friends and other users via private or group messages. The site has the option of real-time chat, as well as a feature that allows the sharing of content on other social media platforms. Users can also customize their streams as well as their communities. In addition, members can also respond to Yookos' activities by simply posting a comment through email.

Yookos had an intuitive interface that allows users to navigate other blogs while being on the site.

== Mobility ==
Users were able to access Yookos on all mobile devices. The mobile app is available on Android, BlackBerry and iOS handsets as well as non-smartphones. Users can access the site via a desktop version as well. The site can accessed at yookos.com on handsets. The site has been designed using a mobile-first approach.

== Technology ==
Tomisin Fashina, Yookos' chief executive officer (CEO), introduced developers to the Yookos application programming interface in 2013 at the Mobile Web West Africa conference.

The site's platform was also upgraded early the same year allowing its users to log into their Yookos accounts using their existing credentials for other social media platforms such as Facebook, LinkedIn, Twitter, Gmail, and Yahoo! as well as share content to these platforms via social media interactivity. Members can also explore varied fields of interest such as sports, entertainment, healthcare, religion, and games available on other social networking platforms such as Google+, Facebook, and LinkedIn without leaving Yookos' homepage.

== Advertising ==
In January 2013, Yookos partnered with Adfu to increase its market reach and push revenue earnings. This collaboration gives Adfu a three-year exclusive contract to sell advertising on the site.
