= LinkExpats =

LinkExpats.com was a niche social networking website for expatriates launched in October 2007. It was created with a simple motto in mind: "Linking expats all over the world". Contrary to misconceptions that the website is for expats only, LinkExpats serves “expatriates, foreigners, international students, exchange visitors and travelers”, as well as locals. It was created to allow the international community to interact with each other in any city in the world. Unlike major social networking websites such as Facebook, MySpace, and LinkedIn, LinkExpats' users cannot befriend each other in the internal section of the website, but they are allowed to contact each other, create ads, participate in the forum discussions and create different events for users.

One of the unique functionalities of the website is that users from a specific country and nationality can create ads, forums, and events only for specific communities in a specific country. As an example, if the user is American and lives in Casablanca, Morocco, then he/she can create an event specifically for Americans living in Casablanca, or create an event specifically for Americans in the world, or all expatriates in Morocco.

LinkExpats members are located in over 500 cities, and 150+ countries. They discuss typical problems and issues international visitors and expatriates face when in a new country, or when they are trying to relocate to another one.

== Privacy ==
According to LinkExpats’ privacy page, users are not allowed to see other members' email addresses. When they send an email to other members through the website, their email address is not visible. Spamming is strictly prohibited. LinkExpats makes it very easy for members to ban others, simply by clicking on ‘ban’ when they receive a spam email from the member in question.

== Features ==
The website allows users to:

- Submit reviews of the country they are living/have been in or if they are from that country
- Create events for the same nationality as themselves
- Participate in forum discussions
- Create ads
