= Classical Lounge =

Social network for classical music enthusiasts

- Website type: Social network service
- Available in: English
- Founded: 2006
- Headquarters: Austin, Texas, {{{location_country}}}
- Key people: Miro Quartet
- Website: classicallounge.com at the Wayback Machine (archived 2008-05-17)
- Registration: Optional
- Launched: August 16, 2006
- Current status: Defunct

Classical Lounge was the first social networking site designed solely for classical music lovers. Built to expand the classical music community, the site and its membership are evidence to a modern, tech-savvy fan base that contradicts the stereotype of the "old and stuffy" classical music audience.

== History ==
Classical Lounge was founded in August 2006 by the members of the Miro Quartet, along with Jason Gindele and Jerry Gindele. Since then, it has gained several thousand members.

In September 2006, the PalmBeachPost.com called it "essentially a MySpace-style deal for classical players, composers, critics and enthusiast". The article falsely credited the social networking site to 21C Media, and the news site later corrected its error.

== Interaction ==
The site facilitates interaction between musicians, students, presenters, managers, journalists, media, instrument makers and dealers. Classical music enthusiasts and audience members are also encouraged to participate. Members of the site can share their music and generally network with the broad classical music community.

== Fate ==
The site was sold to investors in 2009 and shuttered in 2011.
