= Cohost =

Defunct social media platform (2022–2025)

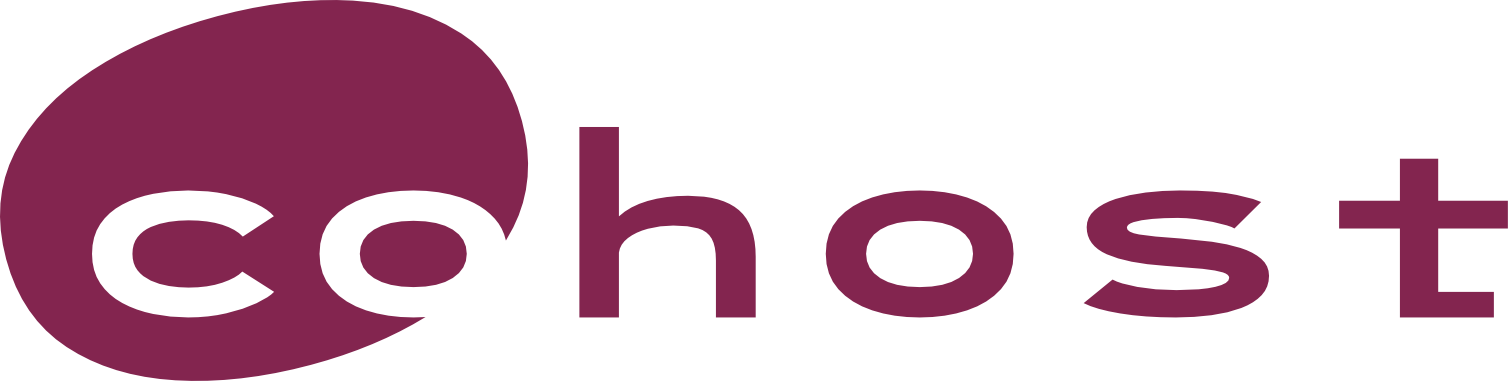

- Screenshot The profile page of eggbug, the site's mascot, in dark mode
- Website type: Social media
- Founded: 2022
- Dissolved: September 9, 2024 (end of registrations); October 1, 2024 (read-only mode); January 12, 2025 (website)
- Country of origin: United States
- Key people: Colin Bayer; Jae Kaplan; Aidan Grealish; Kara
- Employees: 4
- Website: cohost.org
- Registration: Closed
- Users: 203,805 (November 2023)
- Current status: Redirects to the Wayback Machine

Cohost (stylized in all lowercase letters as cohost or cohost!) was a social media website publicly launched in June 2022. It was owned by a not-for-profit software company named Anti Software Software Club (ASSC).

On September 9, 2024, it was announced that it would enter a read-only state on October 1, 2024, and be discontinued at the end of 2024. Registration was closed on the day of the announcement. The shutdown was later postponed to accommodate an archiving effort by the Archive Team. The website was shut down on January 12, 2025.

== History ==
The idea for Cohost was conceptualized in 2019 by Colin Bayer, Jae Kaplan, Aidan Grealish, and Kara; a group of software developers called the Anti Software Software Club (ASSC). The mascot for the website was created in 2020. It was launched in a closed beta in February 2022. Early access registration via invite code was allowed in June of that year. Starting around November, anyone was allowed to register, but new users had to sit through a waiting period before their account was activated.

Cohost was reported as having financial issues in March 2024 after temporarily losing contact with the person funding it, but the site was stated to have backup plans and they were able to reestablish contact with their funder.

In September 2024, it was announced that Cohost would be shutting down at the end of 2024, with the site entering a read-only state on October 1, 2024. The reason given was lack of funding and developer burnout.

== Features ==
Cohost featured posts similar in style to Twitter, but without a character limit. Users could like, comment, and repost, but some interactions were hidden, including like counts on posts, as well as the followers and follower counts of users. There was no trending timeline or algorithm-based timeline; the website instead featured a chronological timeline and a tagging system where searchable hashtags could be attached to posts. The website supported Markdown and editing of HTML and CSS within posts. There was also a monthly subscription service called Cohost Plus (stylized as cohost Plus!, named after Microsoft Plus!), which offered an increased file size limit and other features, but mainly served as a way to support the development of the website. There were plans to implement a tip jar feature and a subscription feature similar to Patreon, where users could subscribe to creators and other users on the site for access to exclusive posts, but the feature (named eggbux) was canceled, as it was understood that their chosen payment processor Stripe disallowed such activity under their terms and conditions.

== Users ==
The active userbase was around 20,000 in February 2023 to around 38,000 in July 2023. The February 2023 report gave the number of registered users at around 130,000. A report by the staff in November 2023 gave the number of registered users as 203,805 and the number of monthly active users as 21,142. The August 2024 report gave the total register user count as around 227,000 with the monthly active user count as 16,846; of those, 3,046 were Cohost Plus subscribers.

== Reception ==
Cohost generally received positive reception. The site was praised for allowing users to edit HTML and CSS in posts, allowing users to make games and so-called "CSS crimes." It was also given praise for allowing users to edit posts after they are posted, a lack of ads, and navigable web design. Some reviewers noted the lack of a proper search feature and the lack of a dedicated mobile app.

== See also ==
- Bluesky
- GeoCities
- Mastodon
- Tumblr
