= Meetro =

Software

- Click for detail screenshot Meetro location-based social network instant messenger
- Developers: Meetro, Inc
- Stable release: 1.0 / May 1, 2007
- Operating system: Microsoft Windows, Mac OS X
- Type: Social messenger, Instant Messaging, Social Networking
- License: proprietary
- Website: www.meetro.com

Meetro was a multi-network social messenger with location-based services (LBS). It was compatible with AOL Instant Messenger, Yahoo! Messenger, MSN Messenger, GTalk, XMPP, and ICQ. Meetro's features made it useful for meeting people with similar interests in a given area, as well as bundling multiple messaging protocols into one program. Meetro was located in San Francisco, California.

Meetro is a software that runs on Windows and Mac OS X operating systems.

== Launch and early history ==
Meetro launched on June 1, 2005. On August 8, 2005, InternetNews reported a rumor that Meetro was in talks to be bought out by search giant Google. On August 14, 2005 SlashDot picked up the story and rumors spread over the internet very quickly. Paul Bragiel, CEO of Meetro, did not initially deny or confirm the rumor, which has been described as a publicity stunt to attract attention, however the rumor was not created by any Meetro Inc. employees but rather a Meetro follower and fan, whom the original article publishing the story called "a source close to the transaction".

== How it works ==
Meetro differed from the other popular messengers in that users could input location specifications to see other online users in surrounding areas. Its location finder was strongest in the Americas and Europe but worked the world over. Users unable to obtain a location could input latitude and longitude details to see how far away other online users are at a particular moment.

Meetro worked by actively scanning for the MAC addresses of wireless access points around a user's location. Then Meetro contacted the main database server and compared the MAC address to a list of known access points. Subsequently it did some mathematical calculations to determine the latitude and longitude of a location. Once Meetro had calculated the general area (usually a quarter mile) of a user's physical location, it then compared it to others users and displayed who's online within a quarter mile, half mile, mile, etc... A user's exact location was never displayed to other people on the network for privacy and security reasons. Meetro would only present that a user is within a range of 1/4 of a mile. Users could choose to make information of their location public, such as "I'm at the cafe on 2nd and Broadway."

Shortly before closing, Meetro added support for business address look-ups in the United States as an alternative method for users to report their location.

== Features ==
Meetro allowed users to create custom profile pages which could be searched and browsed by other users nearby. Meetro's profiles supported feeds for videos, photos, and blogs in addition to the typical social networking profile questions. Users had the option of embedding dynamic feeds from their YouTube videos, Flickr photos, and their personal blogs directly into their profiles. Meetro was one of the few services offering 'profile aggregation' - crawling the web to aggregate a user's digital persona.

Meetro was different than other social networks and messengers in the fact that as soon as you signup, you're able to talk with other users who are nearby instantly, even if they're not approved 'friends'. This is to encourage communication between nearby people.

Towards the end of 2006, Meetro introduced features to display places and services that were nearby (in addition to people). Meetro will display nearby restaurants, cafes, and bars on a map. Meetro had planned to also display the local weather and nearby geotagged photos.

Meetro had introduced a number of location based web widgets, including a StatusBadge that would display a user's last known real-world location on their blog, email, or personal webpage.

Meetro allowed users to create real-time personalized groups within the client. These groups could be configured to show a specific subset of Meetro users grouped by any combination of: Status (away/available), Gender (male, female, unspecified), Minimum Distance, Maximum Distance, Keywords, Relation (friend, friend of a friend, unrelated, MeetroHQ). For example, you could create a group that includes all users that are between 3 and 4 miles away and are currently online. Meetro was one of the only messengers to have a rule-based grouping system, as opposed to other messengers which do not use any personal descriptors or location to sort and filter users.

== Company background ==
Meetro originally started in Chicago, IL with a small team working and living out of the same house. The team moved to Palo Alto, CA in late 2005 and continued the same live/work situation. Meetro grew and enjoyed press coverage for its atypical live/work ethic, including a front page story in the San Francisco Chronicle. At the time of closing, Meetro headquartered in San Francisco's SoMa district.

Meetro closed in 2007. The development team terminated the project in order to focus their efforts on their Lefora project.

== See also ==
- Comparison of instant messaging clients
- Location-based service
