= Hyves =

Social networking site in the Netherlands

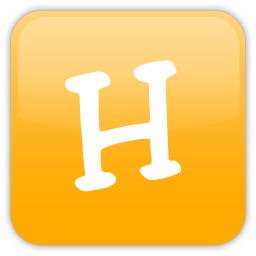
- Website type: Social networking website
- Available in: Dutch, English
- Area served: Netherlands; Flanders
- Owner: Mediahuis Nederland
- Creators: Raymond Spanjar (Founder); Koen Kam (Co-founder); Floris Rost van Tonningen (Co-founder); Nine Ludwig (Editor-in-chief)
- Managing director: Riske Betten
- Parent: Mediahuis NV
- Website: hyves.nl
- Registration: Required
- Users: 11.6 million (November 2013); 305.000 (October 2026)
- Launched: 22 September 2004; 22 September 2026 (relaunch)
- Current status: Active

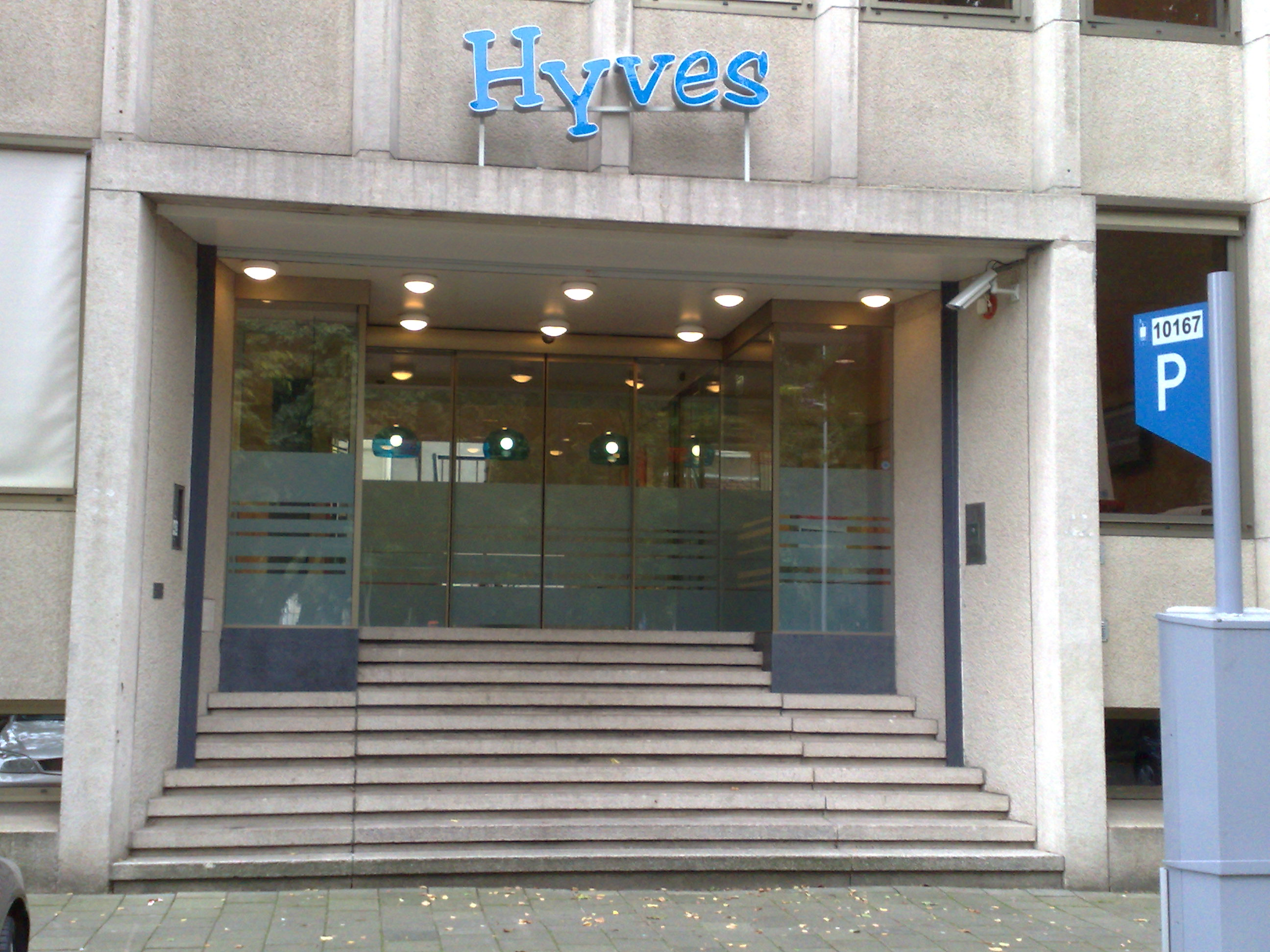
Hyves headquarter in 2010

Hyves is a Dutch social media and social networking site with mainly Dutch visitors and members, where it competed with sites such as Facebook and MySpace. Hyves was founded in 2004 by Raymond Spanjar and Floris Rost van Tonningen. The service is available in both Dutch and English.

In May 2010, Hyves had more than 10.3 million accounts. These corresponded to two thirds of the size of the Dutch population (which stood at over 16 million in 2010), however, these included multiple accounts per person and inactive accounts. The number of accounts had grown by over two million as compared to 1.5 years earlier. Hyves could be used free of charge, but there was an option for a paid Premium Membership (called "Gold Membership"). Gold members had access to some extra features, such as the ability to use a wider variety of smileys in their messages and more uploading space for pictures. The creators have said that the basic of a Hyves account will always be free.

In March 2011, Hyves was still ranked as the top social networking site in the Netherlands with 7.6 million unique visitors compared to 6.6 million for Facebook and 3.2 million for Twitter.

In 2013, the social network was officially discontinued, due to the growing popularity of other social networks like Facebook and Twitter in the Netherlands. The site continued as Hyves Games, where members could use their Hyves accounts to play social games. As a social media platform, the site restarted on 22 september 2026.

== History ==
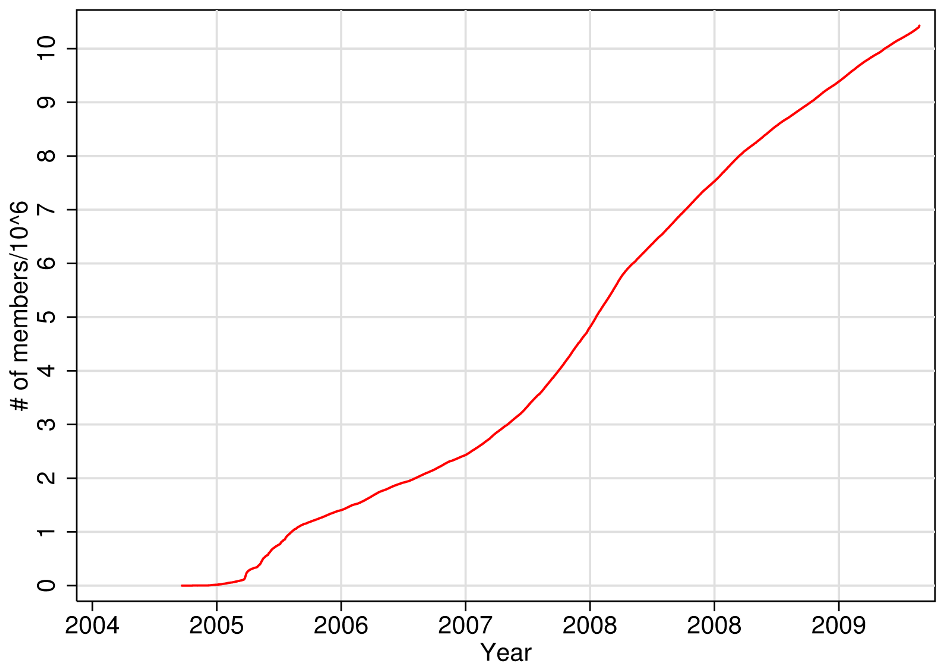
Hyves membership numbers from inception through 2009.

Hyves started in September 2004. The name Hyves was chosen because the desired domain name hives.nl was already taken. The name referred to beehives and the fact that social networks are built the same way.

In May 2006 it became public that the Dutch police was using Hyves as a tool to investigate possible suspects. Only information that is uploaded by suspects is being checked.

On December 13, 2007 Hyves was awarded with the title of "most popular site of the year".

In April 2008, Dutch media tycoon Joop van den Ende took a large interest in Hyves. The intention was to expand abroad and provide mobile services.

Hyves changed its design in July of '09. The site got a new look and feel, described as being more docile and synoptic. The profile picture format was also changed into a standard square shape.

In her Christmas speech of 2009, Queen Beatrix of the Netherlands expressed negative views about online social networks. In response, the founder of Hyves offered her a free account/profile, so that she could experience Hyves herself.

In 2010, it became clear that the fast growth of Hyves was slowing down due to growth of Twitter and Facebook. Therefore, Hyves announced extra measures to leave the competition further behind. These measures were successful, because Hyves welcomed its 10 millionth user in April 2010. Despite the perception that Hyves mostly had young members, the target group ages faster than it rejuvenates. The average age of a member at Hyves is 30 years old. Also, in that same month, Hyves announced "Hyves Payments" and "Hyves Games", which allows users to play games and pay friends through the social network.

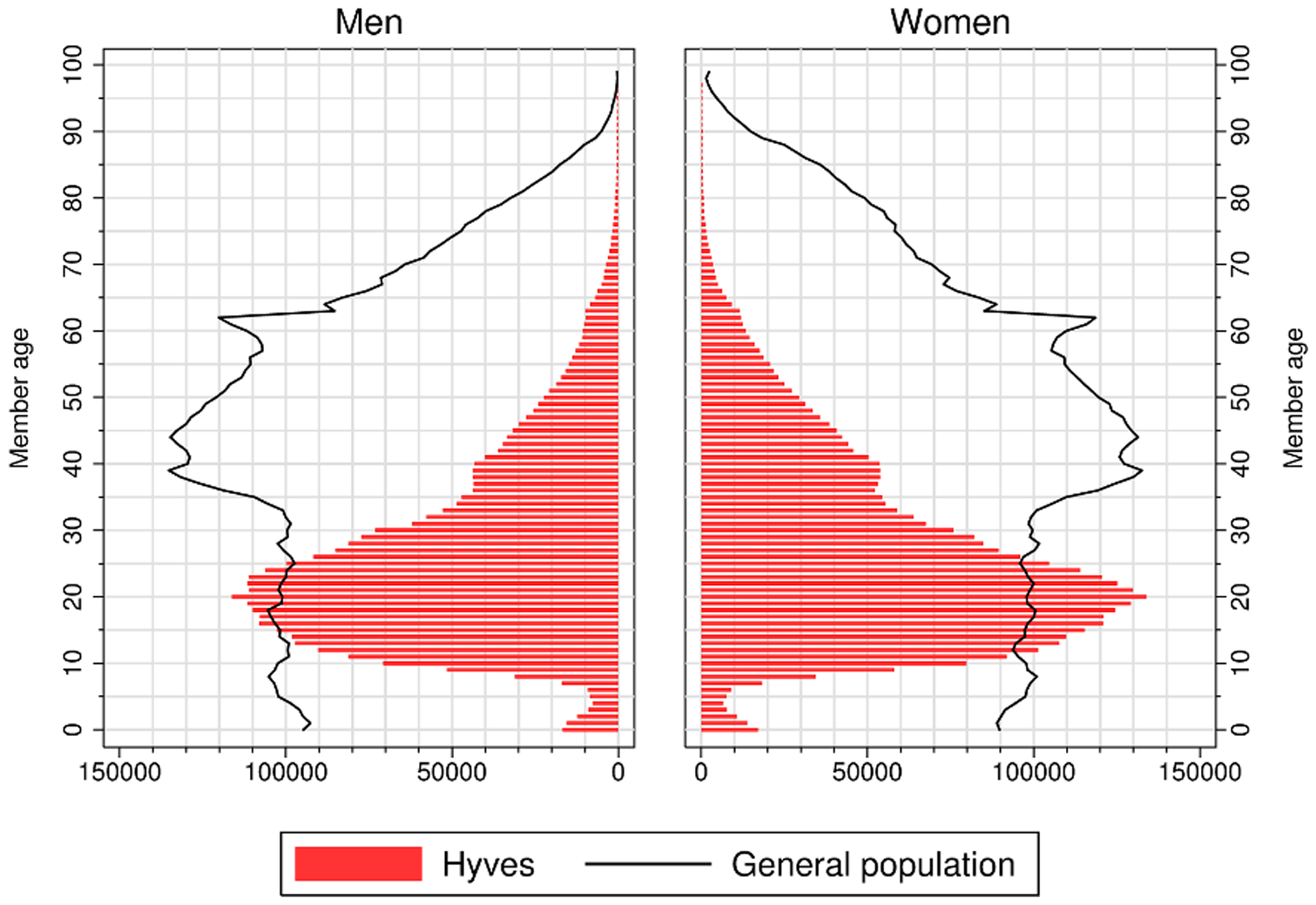
Age-Gender distribution comparison between Hyves and the general Dutch population.

Although Facebook was rapidly growing in the Netherlands, in 2010 Hyves was still the most popular social network with 10.6 million users and a 68% penetration. Hyves was sold to the Telegraaf Media Groep in November that same year.

In September 2011, Facebook received more unique visitors than Hyves since its creation. In the same year, Hyves redirected their focus from a pure social network platform to a content platform by adding a news section, sports results and radio channels.

In 2013, the Telegraaf Media Group announced to reform Hyves from a social network platform to an exclusive gaming platform. All users had the ability to download their social profile. On December 1, 2013 all the not downloaded accounts were removed.

=== Elections on Hyves ===
In February 2006, Wouter Bos was the first Dutch politician with a Hyves account and created a trend. The Prime Minister at that time, Jan Peter Balkenende, also saw the potential to communicate with his target audience through social media. He created an account in 2006. During the Dutch elections of 2010, Hyves was used in a broad range of ways. Every leader of every political party had an account on Hyves, and the world's first debate between political leaders on a social network was organised and hosted by Hyves.

== Features ==
User profiles can be created without knowledge of HTML. Profiles can be built by filling in questionnaires and uploading content.

=== Privacy ===
Hyves' users had the option to make their profiles only available (to a degree chosen by the user) to friends or friends of friends (the so-called 'connections'). Users could also protect their messages by making them visible only to friends or connections.

== See also ==
- Internet in the Netherlands
- List of social networking websites
