= Xanga =

Defunct blogging and social media site

- Website type: Blog
- Dissolved: 2013; 13 years ago
- Owners: Xanga.com, Inc.
- Creators: John Hiler, Marc Ginsburg, Dan Huddle
- Website: www.xanga.com
- Commercial: Free/Subscription
- Registration: Required to blog
- Launched: April 4, 1999; 27 years ago

Xanga (/ˈzæŋɡə/) was a website that hosted weblogs, photoblogs, and social networking profiles. It was operated by Xanga.com, Inc. and based in New York City.

== History ==
Xanga began in 1999 as a site for sharing book and music reviews. It became public in 2000, following a series of e-mail recruitment methods via GeoCities. Over the next few years, Xanga underwent several formatting changes. Featured Content was divided in 2002, being replaced by Premium and Classic views. Eventually, new profile features such as friends, "nudges", and chat forums that resemble Facebook were added, and video and audio capability were added in 2006. In 2013, Xanga was under threat of shutting down unless it raised $60k by mid-July (for "Xanga 2.0"). Failing to reach that goal, Xanga became an un-navigable page in late 2013.

== Core features ==
Xanga members received a "Xanga Site", a website containing a weblog, photoblog, videoblog, audioblog, "Pulse" (mini-blog), and social networking profile. Members could also make or join blogrings (groups).

=== Weblog ===
Xanga first added weblogs to Xanga Sites on November 5, 2000. Comments were added soon after, on December 8, 2000, along with "eProps", which a user could give to another user's entry to show they enjoyed it.

A core part of Xanga was the ability to subscribe to other Xanga Sites. Subscriptions allowed Xanga users to stay up-to-date on other Xangas they were subscribed to, without needing to manually visit each site. Xanga added an email subscriptions feature on November 30, 2000. In January 2001, this was followed by the ability to subscribe to a site using RSS and the ability to display subscriptions on one's site.

Initially, Xanga allowed members to subscribe to each other's sites anonymously. Some users were troubled by anonymous subscriptions, and so during the week of July 15, 2003, support for this feature was discontinued. Since some users had been using anonymous subscriptions to try out subscriptions to other sites, on July 21, 2003, Xanga added a feature that allows members to sample a Trial Subscription to another site. This update also allowed members to hide individual subscriptions from public display.

Subscriptions were originally called "Sites I Read", sometimes abbreviated to "SIR".

=== Photoblog ===
Until the spring of 2006, Xanga's photo features were focused on enabling photo uploads within weblog posts. Xanga first started offering photo uploading on May 1, 2001. Originally, photo uploading was available only to premium members, and was limited to 20 MB of storage (although this was not enforced). On April 7, 2005, Xanga overhauled its photo system to increase picture quality and size, as well as to increase capacity for the system overall. This was followed, on August 5, 2005, with the beta release of a new Photo Manager that allowed users to more easily edit and view their photos.

On August 30, 2005, Xanga announced that all premium members would now get a gigabyte of photo storage. On September 9, 2005, web-based batch uploading of photos was added; on September 26, 2005, all Xanga Classic members were given 1 gigabyte of free photo storage and Premium members were increased to two gigabytes of storage. On September 28, 2005, moblogging support was added.

Xanga released its photoblog offering on April 6, 2006; the ability to comment on photoblog posts followed on April 28, 2006. On May 18, 2006, Xanga introduced new tools that streamlined batch publishing to a photoblog.

=== Videoblog ===
Xanga Videoblogs were officially launched on August 9, 2007 with a video featuring Xanga employee Chris Choi's dog Gromit.

=== Audioblog ===
On September 29, 2006, Xanga launched Audio Blogs after about a month of beta testing.

=== Pulse ===
On February 22, 2007, Xanga introduced "Pulse", which was described as a "carefree miniblog". A Pulse message can also be uploaded by cell phone.

=== Profile ===
Xanga supported limited profiles as early as its launch in 2000. Profiles were revamped on February 1, 2004, to hold more information and offer better email security and control. Each member was allowed to upload one profile picture. On April 30, 2004, Xanga upgraded its profile image uploading to offer better quality images. Then on July 27, 2004, Xanga followed up with allowing the uploading of multiple profile pictures; classic members were allowed to upload up to 3 profile pictures, while Premium members were allowed to upload up to 99 profile pictures. Xangans were allowed to set a default picture that would appear next to their username, as well as choose between their profile pictures in each entry. Then, on November 19, 2004, Xanga extended its support of multiple profile pictures to comment icons; now Xanga users could choose which profile picture they wanted to appear next to each of their comments.

Then on April 6, 2006, Xanga upgraded its profiles to offer traditional social networking features—including the ability to connect with friends, to search for friends, and to fill out profile fields. On June 6, 2006, a link to each users' profile was added to the standard Xanga navigation at the top of every Xanga site (along with Photos).

Xanga profiles also include Memories, Nudge, and a Chatboard.

== Revenue ==
=== Premium subscriptions ===
The Xanga Premium plan provided 2 GB of photo storage and 100 MB of monthly uploads while the Premium Plus plan provided unlimited photo storage and 1GB of monthly uploads. Premium members on both plans could customize their site using skins, post entries to their site via electronic mail, and download archives of their entries. Pages of Premium members did not contain web banners. Some other Premium features included a higher limit on profile pictures, a custom sidebar, and specialized page skins.

Xanga Premium was first launched on May 1, 2001, largely consisting of 20 MB of photo hosting (although limits on photos were not enforced). A downloadable archive of entries and comments was added to the premium offering on May 10, 2001, while customizable Skins were added on February 15, 2002.

Payment options for Premium grew over time. When Premium first launched on May 1, 2001, Xangans could pay for Premium only with a credit card. Support for check payments was added on April 15, 2002, while support for PayPal was added on May 13, 2002. Support for gifting of Premium was added on December 23, 2001. The Premium Plus plan was added on November 8, 2005.

Xanga Premium later increased to 10 GB of storage space.

=== Advertising ===
Xanga was largely supported by advertising, in the form of banner ads that appear on the top of most pages on Xanga. Xanga ads first appeared on the site on May 30, 2001. On September 21, 2005, the ads were changed to a larger leaderboard format.

== COPPA violations and fine ==
On September 7, 2006, the Federal Trade Commission announced a $1 million fine against Xanga for violations of the Children's Online Privacy Protection Act. According to the FTC, although the site's Terms of Service stated no one under 13 was permitted to use Xanga, a user could still put their birthdate as under the age of 13 and successfully join. The FTC stated that 1.7 million accounts existed at the time for users under 13.
