= Bianca.com =

Defunct online community forum

bianca.com, informally known as Bianca's Smut Shack, was an online community created on February 14, 1994, by a group of dot-com software developers. Originally based in Chicago, the group later moved to San Francisco and included David Thau and Chris Form Miller. bianca was one of the web's first 500 content creations and was the world's first web-based chat room. It later also became a popular theme camp at the Burning Man festival.

The site has long been infamous for its extreme free speech and raucous discourse and its sociological effect on the Internet and elsewhere has been extensively detailed in a thesis by "Freeform" (Miller), who studies bianca-style chat rooms as a sort of petri dish for incubating deviant behavior.

In 1997, Radio Shack sought to prevent bianca's "Smut Shack" from using that name, citing their previous use of the word "shack" and claiming exclusive use. They later backed down from their legal action.

In 1999, the site was purchased by Nerve.com, but by 2001 they had given up on the venture due to excessive bandwidth costs. Nerve announced bianca's impending closure, though they vowed to find a way to preserve at least part of the site.

== Flooding, abuse, cyber attacks and the demise ==
At the time of the site's creation, the posts in Bianca's chat rooms could be of any length. If a user had a 100-line-long poem they wanted to post, the chat software would have accepted and posted it. This was manageable when bianca was a smaller, more closely knit community. However, as Bianca grew more popular, cyber vandals eventually found their way to the site. They too could post 100-line-long rants if they pleased. Other vandals took a more direct approach. Some posted links which were claimed to be to pornographic images, but in fact directed the viewer to any of a number of early internet "shock sites" (Murman.com and "All Things Dark and Gruesome" being popular choices) that displayed autopsy or crime scene photos and other disturbing images. On other occasions organized groups of "raiders" would enter a Bianca.com chat room together and begin abusing all the other occupants of the room with racial slurs and other language designed to offend. The result was often the emptying of the room, for a time, of all legitimate users. As the site prided itself on allowing all users freedom of speech, little effort was made to correct what quickly became a problem in terms of both site management and bandwidth, bringing the system to its knees.

One of the other criticisms of the site was that the code of the forum (primitive by later standards) displayed the full IP address of those who posted there. While the knowledge of how to trace an individual by IP was not widely known amongst early Web users, it had the potential (and on occasions did) lead to cyber stalking and other forms of harassment of site visitors.

Some anti-flooding software was later added, but was shown not to be impervious to persistent hackers.

Although it is unclear who was actually managing the server, Bianca operated with intermittent functionality and frequent outages as late as early 2007. At some point after that, hackers were able to access the server and delete the contents, using a function that rendered the data irretrievable.

For a while the home page continued to exist, along with some archived messages and the site's update page. Then, there remained the "shack map" and an email contact link. Now the site is a blank white page, only displaying the black text message "bianca loves you."

== bianca.org ==
The sister site bianca.org houses some information about the core group involved with bianca.com-related real world activities. Originally, since 2006 the site claimed:

bianca.org is the real-world extension of the online community known as bianca.com, which doesn't necessarily mean that we bare [sic] any resemblance or likeness to any of the activities of bianca.com but we do take our name and spirit from that which is the great bianca!

It has since been updated to show:

what you'll find here is an idea of what bianca is, what the shack has been, events that we've thrown, and events that we will be throwing or participating in; not to mention recipes for how to cook a killer grilled cheese sandwich.

love,

bianca
