= WeeWorld =

Scottish social networking and messaging website

- Type: Private
- Industry: Social Network
- Predecessor: WeeWorld Inc Limited
- Founded: Glasgow, Scotland; 20 March 2000; 26 years ago
- Founders: Mike Kinsella & John McGuire
- Defunct: 11 May 2017; 9 years ago
- Headquarters: Glasgow, Scotland
- Area served: Worldwide
- Key people: Mike Kinsella (CEO); John McGuire (COO); Celia Francis (CEO)
- Products: Social network, social game, virtual worlds, avatar

WeeWorld was a Scottish social networking and messaging website, originally created in 2000 by a company based in Glasgow, Scotland, with smaller offices in London and Boston, Massachusetts. The company created WeeWorld.com, which hosted a massively multiplayer online game (MMO) aimed at teens and preteens. The game was known for its brand of virtual world-based social simulation and customizable avatars known as "WeeMees". By the time of its dissolution, there were an estimated 180 million WeeMees created worldwide.

The company was run by English technology executive Celia Francis (who joined the company in 2004) at the time it went into liquidation in 2014. Its joint liquidators, Tom MacLennan and Iain Fraser of FRP Advisory LLP, effectively sold the IP behind the site to Metis Partners in 2015. It was thereafter sold to Opinurate, who shut down the website in 2017. As of 2026, the site redirects the visitor to an unverifiable gambling service.

== WeeMees ==
A WeeMee was an avatar that could be exported to Facebook, Twitter and e-mail. WeeMees appeared primarily on WeeWorld.com. WeeMees could be used to chat in a virtual world, play games and participate in forums. Users customized their WeeMees with trendy clothing, accessories and interests to make their WeeMee unique.

By June 2005, nearly 5 million users had created a personal WeeMee. In October 2006, Iain Bruce of the Sunday Herald reported a new WeeMee being created every 5 seconds, and by April 2008 more than 21 million had been created with more than 600,000 new ones created each month. By 2012, there were 50 million WeeMees, and thousands were being created daily through the main website and the mobile app "WeeMee Avatar Creator".

=== Background ===
The avatars were created in 1999 by the founder of the now-defunct website Saw-You.com, Mike Kinsella in Glasgow, Scotland.

WeeWorld partnered with corporations such as AOL, MSN and Skype. In 2003, Microsoft began offering the avatars for use to Hotmail customers via the MSN chat service. The new service attracted 150,000 users during its first day, totaling 1.5 million hits daily. In 2004, the UK's largest social network, Friendsreunited.com, introduced the WeeMee to their user base. In December 2008, the virtual technology firm DA agreed to develop a 3-D version of the avatar.

In the early 2010s a number of WeeMee apps were released for Android, iOS and Windows mobile devices, including "WeeMee Avatar Creator", "Talking WeeMee" and "WeeMee Vacation".

=== Celebrity WeeMees ===
Along with using their own custom WeeMee on Weeworld.com, users could access the pages of celebrities who had WeeMees with their complete likeness. In addition to official celebrity WeeMees, the game included "Fan Clubs", which were run through WeeWorld and allowed users to interact with other fans of particular celebrity figures. Popular celebrity WeeMees included Justin Bieber, Cody Simpson, Jason Derulo, Greyson Chance, Willow Smith, Maroon 5, Snoop Dogg, Alicia Keys, Justin Timberlake, Paris Hilton, Raven-Symoné, The Pussycat Dolls and the Jonas Brothers.

Many celebrities had their own virtual clothing lines on WeeWorld, which users could use to dress their own avatars. Through a partnership with RCA Records, WeeWorld promoted artists such as Alicia Keys and Avril Lavigne through virtual merchandise sales and advertisement of the artists' WeeMees. Only Derulo and Snoop Dogg attested to their direct involvement with the game, listing promotions for their respective avatars on Twitter.
