= Itsmy =

Mobile gaming network with global user base

itsmy
- Website type: Social network game
- Available in: English
- Owner: Gofresh Gmbh
- Creators: Jukka Saarelainen & Antonio Vince Staybl
- Website: mobile.itsmy.com
- Commercial: Yes
- Registration: ?
- Launched: 2010 (relaunch)
- Current status: Defunct since 1 May 2014

itsmy was a mobile social gaming network that allowed users to communicate with each other while playing games. It was owned by Gofresh, a company located in Munich, Germany. At its height, the network had more than 2.5 million mobile phone users worldwide. The network was available in English, German, Italian, and Spanish.

After failing to make a profit for several years, itsmy announced its closure in March 2014. The site was scheduled to close on 29 April 2014, but due to data issues the closure was delayed and users could still use the network until 1 May 2014.

== See also ==
- List of social networking websites
- Mobile social network
- Social television
