= We Heart It =

Social networking site

- Screenshot
- Available in: Multilingual (23)
- Headquarters: San Francisco, California
- Area served: Worldwide
- Owners: Super Basic, LLC.
- Founder: Fabio Giolito
- Industry: Internet
- Website: weheartit.com
- Registration: Required
- Users: ▲45 million
- Launched: January 3, 2008; 18 years ago
- Current status: Inactive

We Heart It (also stylized as we♥it) was an image-based social network. We Heart It describes itself as "A home for your inspiration" and a place to "Organize and share the things you love." Users could collect (or "heart") their favorite images to share with friends and organize into collections. Users can access the site through We Heart It's iOS and Android mobile apps.

== History ==
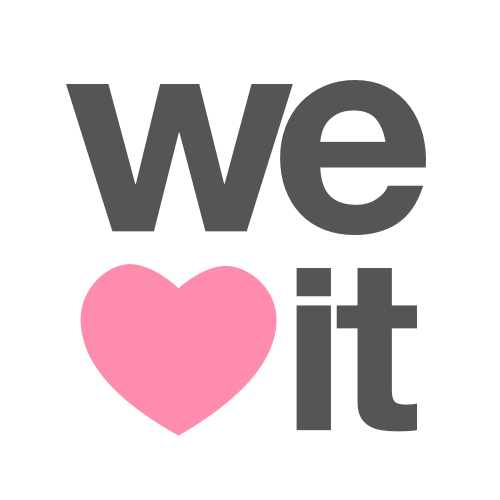
Logo used until 12 December 2016

We Heart It was founded in 2008 by Fabio Giolito, a native of Brazil. He started the site as an alternative to the popular invite-only website FFFFOUND! when he was unable to get an invitation. We Heart It was based around the idea of "hearting" photos and saving them for sharing with friends. The product then began to grow organically.

When growth began to surge, Fabio brought on co-founder Bruno Zanchet to help focus on infrastructure. The two took on some seed funding and the site became an incorporated business of 25 employees in San Francisco in 2011. We Heart It then raised a further $8 million in Series A funding from White Oak and IDG Ventures in June 2013.

We Heart It announced a video content partnership with Popular TV in January 2016.

In June 2016, We Heart It formed a strategic partnership with influencer marketing company The Blu Market, led by co-CEOs Steven Forkosh and Jonas Brothers singer Kevin Jonas, in hopes of attracting more users and advertisers.

We Heart It is no longer incorporated in the United States. It is now owned by Super Basic, LLC. It no longer has an office or any employees in San Francisco.

In 2023, We Heart It removed the ability to upload photos from its app, only allowing users to download their previously collected images through the website.

== Features ==
We Heart It was primarily a visual platform that supported still images and animated GIFs. In recent years, the platform had been updated to allow written posts, known as Articles. It had also introduced a Podcasts feature that includes listenable audio episodes of various podcasts.

It offered follow icons, live widgets, and share buttons for users who wanted to incorporate We Heart It on their website or blog.

We Heart It lacked features for commenting or "dislikes". As a result, users posting content will not potentially receive negative comments as they might on other social networks.

We Heart It first rolled out mobile advertising in the app in May 2014.

In March 2015, We Heart It introduced a new postcard feature, allowing its 30 million registered users to message one another with images.

In 2015, Weheartit launched a 'Heartist' program to award its top users. 'Heartists' are a selection of the most engaged We Heart It users every year, acknowledged as leaders in creativity known to inspire other members of the community. We Heart It awards each Heartist with a pink star badge displayed on their profile picture.

In December 2015, the companion app Easel was released. With Easel, users can create custom images with quotes, filters, and colors to share on We Heart It or other social media apps.

In late August 2017, the feature Articles was released on the site to even further its users' creativity. This function enabled users to share poems, recipes, opinions, creative thoughts and ideas, advice; anything you are able to write down. A while later, “Reactions” were added to the site where you could react to the articles with 5 different options. If you did not want to heart an article, you had the choice to react to it still, while it not having to appear in your canvas. In 2018, reactions for images were added as well.

== Usage ==
In December 2013, We Heart It reached 25 million monthly users. Four out of five of the site's over 25 million users were under 24 years old, and more than 70 percent were female. We Heart It has an average user age of 19.

On average, We Heart It members spend more than 16.5 minutes on the site at a time. The average mobile app users opens the app over 25 times per month.

In February 2014, We Heart It ranked 754 in Alexa's global traffic rank.

The Huffington Post cited We Heart It as one of the "10 Happiest Places On The Internet" for finding a smile or inspiration on.

We Heart It was chosen as one of Google Play's Best Apps of 2013 and Best Apps of 2015.
