= WAYN (website) =

Social travel website

Where Are You Now? Ltd
- Website type: Travel & lifestyle social network
- Founded: 2002; 24 years ago
- Founders: Peter Ward, Jerome Touze, Mike Lines
- Industry: Internet
- Employees: 21 (July 2016)
- Divisions: London, Cape Town, Szczecin
- Website: www.wayn.com
- Current status: Closed

WAYN (an acronym for Where Are You Now?) was a social travel network. Its stated goal is to help discover where to go and meet like-minded people. WAYN was the brain child of entrepreneurs Jerome Touze and Peter Ward and was founded in 2002.

Like other social networking services, WAYN enabled its users to create a profile and upload photos. Users could search for other users and link them to their profiles as friends. The founders part-exited the business in 2006 in a $11m deal to DFJ Esprit and valuing the company at $46m. In 2015 it claims to have over 20 million users. By 2013, the site grew to 22 million registered users, growing at a daily rate of 5,000 new users and adding 25,000 new travel photos every day. In late 2016, the website was bought by Lastminute.com in an asset purchase deal at terms that were not disclosed.

The acquisition meant that Wayn's database of users and content was added to The Travel People, lastminute.com's media division. The Travel People claims to reach 43 million monthly unique visitors every month across all its brands (Lastminute.com, Rumbo, Volagratis, Bravofly and Jetcost).

== History ==
WAYN was founded in 2004 in London by Jerome Touze (Co-CEO), Peter Ward (Co-CEO) and Mike Lines (CTO), after Jerome came up with the idea to connect people based on their location while having a few beers in their local pub. Jerome had the original concept, but he didn't have any technology skills to make it a reality. He was working at the time at a consultancy firm in London, and connected with Peter Ward with a likeminded approach to entrepreneurship. Peter, was very close friends with Mike Lines, who was the lynchpin in the whole program and built the entir wayn service including its full website and backend services single handidly.

WAYN initially grew through word-of-mouth and reached almost 50,000 members by the end of 2004. Following its relaunch in May 2005 it reached over 2.5 million members by the end of 2005. On 26 March 2012 the site claimed "over 19.1m members".

The business started with initial seed funding in 2003 from the original founder of Friends Reunited.

In 2006, the WAYN Founders managed to complete a part exit of the company for $11 million from DFJ Esprit and attracting famous internet entrepreneurs as investors such as Brent Hoberman (ex-founder of lastminute.com), Hugo Burge (CEO of cheapflights.co.uk), Adrian Critchlow and Andy Phillips (ex-founders of Active Hotels) and Constant Tedder (ex-CEO of Jagex, an online gaming company) and was referred to at the time as the 'Myspace of Travel'.

== Services ==
WAYN users could post photos from their trips. Registered users sent and received messages using email, discussion forums, E-cards, SMS, and instant messages and Q&A. WAYN provided a destination browsing service to discover Where to go next and WAYN members could interact with each other and ask questions on the destinations through a Questions & Answers service. The site also provided Social Opinions, which generated more than 25,000 opinions daily in 2014. In 2015, WAYN announced major strategic partnerships with Booking.com to offer hotels booking to its users as well as Viator to offer tours and activities booking.

== Contact import ==
Like many other social media sites, WAYN encouraged its users to invite their friends, which in turn led to the contacts of the members to receive an invitation to join. In 2006, some members vented their frustration, claiming they were not aware that an invitation would be sent to their contacts. The company acknowledged that this process could be improved and subsequently changed the way in which invitations were generated and has also signed up with Return Path, one of the few whitelisting companies in the world that certified Emails Best Practice at the time.

== Use ==
WAYN Alexa Internet traffic ranking was 12,251 as of March 2017 down more than 2,000 position from the prior year. It claimed in 2013 to house user data for over 22 million users in 193 different countries.

== Monetisation ==
WAYN.com commercialised its website through advertising. The site also offered a membership service (VIP) for users who wished to access to travel and lifestyle benefits. Later, the site launched a travel booking service for users to book their hotels and tours globally.
