= DXY.cn =

DXY.cn 丁香园
- Website type: Medical, Social network service, Health
- Available in: Chinese
- Website: www.dxy.cn
- Commercial: Yes
- Registration: Optional
- Launched: July 23, 2000
- Current status: Active

DXY.cn (Chinese: 丁香园; pinyin: Dīngxiāng Yuán; lit. 'Lilac Garden') is an online community for physicians, health care professionals, pharmacies and facilities, established on July 23, 2000 by Tiantian Li.

DXY is more of a vertical community (a type of virtual community) than a traditional social network service, where physicians can gain insight from colleagues, discuss new clinical findings, report usual events and more. The company's Chinese name is 丁香园 (meaning "lilac garden"). The site is one of the largest physicians online community worldwide, with more than 3.2 million members.

It also publishes news on clinical progress and industry news, reports conference and prepares professional material for physicians' continuing education. The commercial business covers Biomart (platform for biomedical e-commerce), JobMD (platform for healthcare job searching and matching and headhunt service), DXY survey (market research related service).

== DXY.com ==
DXY.com (Chinese: 丁香医生; pinyin: Dīngxiāng Yīshēng; lit. 'Dr. Lilac') is a telemedicine platform affiliated with DXY.cn. It also offers a medical news service for a lay audience, as well as an online database for approved medication (official monographs and additional info).
