= TravBuddy.com =

Travbuddy
- Website type: Social network service
- Available in: English
- Owner: TravBuddy LLC
- Creators: Eric and David Bjorndahl
- Website: travbuddy.com
- Launched: 2005
- Current status: Shut down

Travbuddy.com was a social networking website specializing in connecting travellers. The site was created by brothers Eric Bjorndahl and David Bjorndahl and launched in 2005 by TravBuddy LLC, a privately owned company.

The site allowed users to find travel buddies planning to travel to the same places at the same times, create travel based blogs, upload travel photos and review bars, restaurants, hotels and attractions.

As of August 2013, the site had nearly 470,000 registered contributors.

As of August 2013, the site provided free access to over 198,000 blogs, 97,000 travel reviews, and 4,600,000 travel photos.

The site ceased operations on April 23, 2018.

Since its launch, the site has been featured on the NBC Nightly News, Popular Science, Real Simple Travel, and the Herald Tribune.
