= Kiwibox =

Social network

- Website type: Social networking service
- Dissolved: 2019
- Owners: Kiwibox.com, Inc.
- Website: www.kiwibox.com
- Registration: Yes
- Launched: 1999; 27 years ago
- Current status: Inactive

Kiwibox.com was a social networking service. It was founded in 1999 and went defunct in September 2019.

== Company Information and History ==
Kiwibox.com was initially founded in 1999 to give teenagers a voice on the internet and was a leader in the teen oriented world for several years. It was founded by three Carnegie Mellon University graduates, Lin Dai, Michael Howard, and Ivan Tumanov. Dai served as the Chief Executive Officer and Editor-in-Chief, Howard as the Chief Operation Officer, and Tumanov as the Chief Technology Officer. The first editors came from Carnegie Mellon University and University of Pittsburgh, and included Sonni Abatta, now a lead news anchor at WOFL-TV in Orlando.

In August 2007, the company was bought by Magnitude Information Systems, Inc., a publicly listed company. In 2008, the company launched a new version, Kiwibox 2.0 and in October 2009 the company launched Kiwibox 3.0, shifting its audience focus from teenagers to young adults. The new platform brings the community to the next level with the latest social network technology. As of December 31, 2009, Kiwibox Media Inc. merged with Magnitude Information Systems and renamed itself to Kiwibox.com, Inc. the New York-based social network. In the beginning of 2011 Kiwibox acquired Pixunity.de, a photoblog community and launched a U.S. version of this community in the summer of 2011. Effective July 1, 2011 Kiwibox.com, Inc. became the owner of Kwick! – a top social network community based in Germany. Kiwibox.com shares are freely traded on the bulletin board under the symbol KIWB.OB.

On September 19, 2019, Kiwibox posted on Facebook that the site would go offline in the near future. The post encouraged users to download personal information as soon as possible.

== Features ==
Kiwibox had a number of unique features such as blogging, photos, status updates, games, forums, event pictures, event scheduling, etc.

== History ==
Kiwibox 1.0, 1999 launch

=== 1999 - 2004 ===
Kiwibox was founded and launched.

=== 2005 - 2007 ===
Kiwibox exceeded 1 million registered members. Kiwibox merged with Magnitude Information Systems (OTC BB:MAGY.OB).

=== 2008 - 2009 ===
August 2008, Kiwibox launched the new Kiwibox 2.0 site. With the launch of Kiwibox 2.0, the mobile platform also went live for users to gain access to Kiwibox via cell phones.

During 2008, the Kiwibox Teen Network was also launched. In late 2008, Kiwibox signed contracts with Universal Music Group to distribute video content to its users.

Early in 2009, with over 500 original self-produced videos, Kiwibox was accepted into the partnership program with YouTube. Kiwibox crossed 2 million registered members. The 4KIWI SMS platform launched enabling users to get SMS updates from news to friend alerts.

=== 2010-2014 ===
During the beginning months of 2010, Kiwibox released their full functioning Android application allowing users to easily explore, connect, and party via their cellular phones. The revamped site is now a community for college students and young professionals, to connect with friends on the net and meet new people while having a fulfilling online experience. Kiwibox is a platform for them to show off their skills and interests, whether it is writing, photography, event promotion and planning, or general technical tasks. Along with the social network, the Nightlife/Events section continues to thrive bringing people in NYC together at events and online.

=== 2015 ===
Kiwibox lauded its new designed webpage. This year Kiwibox reached 3 million users and continues to grow with the new user-friendly app and website.

== See also ==
- List of social networking websites
