= Koo (social network) =

Indian social network service, 2020–2024

- Koo's logo

- Koo's homepage on desktop version
- Company type: Private
- Website type: Microblogging; Social networking service; News
- Available in: Multilingual
- Founded: 14 November 2019
- Dissolved: 3 July 2024
- Headquarters: Bengaluru, Karnataka, India
- Country of origin: India
- Area served: Worldwide
- Owner: Koo Corporation Pvt Ltd
- Founders: Aprameya Radhakrishna; Mayank Bidawatka
- Key people: Aprameya Radhakrishna (CEO)
- Industry: Internet; Social media; Social networking service; Social network advertising
- Employees: 200 (September 2021)
- Website: kooapp.com
- Advertising: Yes
- Commercial: Yes
- Registration: Optional
- Users: 60 million (November 2022)
- Launched: 2020
- Current status: Defunct
- Native clients on: iOS, Android, Web

Koo was an Indian microblogging and social networking service, owned by Bengaluru-based Bombinate Technologies. It was co-founded by entrepreneurs Aprameya Radhakrishna and Mayank Bidawatka. The app was launched in early 2020; it won the government's Atmanirbhar App Innovation Challenge which selected the best apps from some 7,000 entries across the country.

As of November 2022, the company was valued at over $275 million. Investors in Bombinate Technologies include Tiger Global Management, Blume Ventures, Kalaari Capital and Accel, and former Infosys CFO TV Mohandas Pai's 3one4 Capital.

On 3 July 2024, the founders announced their decision to shut down the platform.

== History ==
=== Initial growth ===
According to statistics provided by analytics provider Sensor Tower, Koo saw 2.6 million installs from Indian app stores in 2020, compared to 2.8 crore (28 million) installs observed for Twitter. From 6 to 11 February, the installations of Koo increased rapidly. The app increased in popularity after a weeklong standoff between Twitter and the Government of India over Twitter's refusal to block accounts during the 2020–2021 Indian farmers' protest. The government demanded that Twitter block the accounts of hundreds of activists, journalists, and politicians, accusing them of spreading misinformation. Twitter complied with a majority of the orders, but refused some, citing freedom of expression. Following this standoff, many Cabinet Ministers such as Piyush Goyal, various government officials & supporters of the Bharatiya Janata Party moved to Koo and urged their supporters to follow. This led to a surge in Koo's user base. In April 2021, Ravi Shankar Prasad became the first minister with 2.5 million followers on Koo.

=== Koo in Nigeria ===
Koo was the go-to alternative to Twitter in Nigeria after the country indefinitely banned Twitter for deleting a tweet by Nigerian President Muhammadu Buhari. The tweet had threatened a crackdown on regional separatists "in the language they understand". Twitter claimed the post was in violation of Twitter rules, but gave no further details. Twitter was officially banned in Nigeria on 5 June 2021. The Government of Nigeria created their official Koo account five days later on 10 June. In 2022, it was reported that Nigerian government officials had stopped using Koo after the ban on Twitter was lifted.

=== Koo in Brazil ===
After crises involving the acquisition of Twitter by Elon Musk in 2022, Koo became an attractive social network for Brazilian users. According to one of the founders, Aprameya Radhakrishna, until 16 November, only two thousand Brazilian users used Koo, which placed Brazil in position 75 on the list of countries with the most lifetime unique users. On the 18th alone, more than a million Brazilians registered on the social network, which placed Brazil in second place on the list. The app featured at number 1 in the Google's Play Store and Apple's App Store in Brazil. Soon Portuguese support was added in the App. Koo received so many submissions and comments that the site became unstable. Personalities such as Felipe Neto, Casimiro, Bruno Gagliasso and Pocah created their accounts on the social network. The name "Koo", which has the same pronunciation as "cu", a vulgar term for the anus in Portuguese language, drew attention of users. Koo held a poll on Twitter asking Brazilians if the name of the social network should be changed, which was rejected. Koo reached the Top 3 of Twitter's trending topics in Brazil.

== Funding ==
As of May 2021, Koo investors include Accel, Kalaari Capital, Blume Ventures, Dream Incubator, 3one4 Capital, Blume Ventures, IIFL, and Mirae Asset. On 26 May 2021, Koo raised $30 million (about ₹218 crore) in Series B funding, led by Tiger Global Management. After raising $30 million from Tiger Global Management, Koo's valuation increased, reaching over $100 million, up from about $25 million in February. Shunwei Capital sold its whole stake in Koo by March 2021. On 25 November 2022, Koo further raised $6 million in a funding round led Accel Partners and Tiger Global.

== Interface and features ==
=== Logo ===
Koo's logo is a yellow bird. The design of the bird was streamlined on 14 May 2021.

=== User experience ===
Koo's interface is similar to that of Twitter, allowing users to categorize their posts with hashtags and tag other users in mentions or replies. Similarly to the terms tweet and retweet, to make a post on Koo is to koo, and sharing or reposting an existing koo, to re-koo. Koo uses a yellow and white interface.

On 4 May 2021, Koo introduced a new feature called "Talk to Type" which allows its users to create a post with the app's voice assistant.

Koo marks verified accounts with a yellow-coloured tick.

On 14 March 2023, the company integrated ChatGPT in Koo so that users can use it to create content and posts.

=== Languages ===
Koo was first launched in Kannada and supports Hindi, English, Portuguese, Tamil, Telugu, Assamese, Marathi, Bengali, Gujarati, Punjabi, Hausa, Spanish, Italian, German, French, Thai, Vietnamese, Turkish, Korean.

== Security incidents ==
In February 2021, a cybersecurity expert showed a data breach on the app, but the company rejected the claim.

On 19 November 2022, an update caused a vulnerability allowing profiles to be hacked. KooForBrasil's Twitter profile admitted the failure and apologized saying that there had never been an invasion before.

== Reception ==
- 2020 - Koo got Rank 2 in the Government of India's 'Atmanirbhar Bharat App Innovation Challenge' in the Social category.
- 2021 - Koo was ranked among the Top 3 social media products in APAC (Asia-pacific) region as per the Amplitude report.
- 2022 - Koo CEO Aprameya Radhakrishnan was recognized as the Top 100 global tech changemakers.

== Crisis and closure ==
In April 2024, it was reported that Koo faced difficulties paying employee salaries for April, and that future salaries could only be paid when a potential sale of Koo completed.

On 3 July 2024, the founders announced their decision to shut the platform down due to an unpredictable market, failed partnerships and the high cost of technology services involved. They hinted at a possibility of selling some of the company assets, and that they would stop operations immediately.

== See also ==
- ShareChat
- Twitter
