= IWiW =

Hungarian social network service (2002–2014)

iWiW
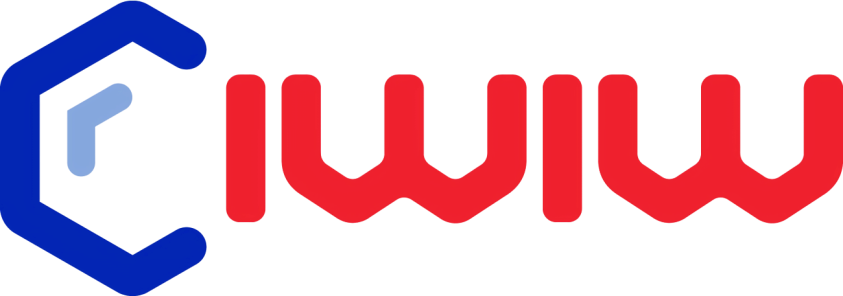
- Website type: Social network service
- Owner: Origo Média és Kommunikációs Szolgáltató Zrt.
- Website: iwiw.hu (now redirects to Origo)
- Registration: Required, by invitation
- Launched: 14 April 2002
- Current status: Defunct as of 30 June 2014

iWiW (abbreviation for International Who is Who) was a Hungarian social networking web service which started on 14 April 2002 as WiW (Who Is Who). As of August 2007, it had 2.6 million registered users with real names. Every user could provide personal information such as the place they live, date of birth, schools and universities they attended, workplaces, interests and pets. One could find friends by a search tool or looking through one's acquaintances' acquaintances.

On 26 October 2005 the system was rebuilt from scratch and got a new name (iWiW). The most important changes were the multilingual interface (reverted to Hungarian-only as of July 2006), listings, photo upload and a special Java applet to visualize the connections.

On 28 April 2006, T-Online, the net branch of Magyar Telekom, purchased iWiW for almost one billion HUF (about US$4.7 million) from Virgo Systems Informatikai Kft. Users expressed concerns that their personal data may be sold to telemarketers or used for other purposes potentially hurting their privacy. Because of fears of abuse by the Hungarian telco giant, several iWiW clones and unrelated Hungarian social networking websites appeared or gained popularity after the take-over.

After the T-Online acquisition, the site was available only in Hungarian.

On 18 July 2006, iWiW had 1 million users and on 18 December it reached 1.5 million.

On 24 December 2008, the number of registered users on iWiW was 4 million, covering almost all internet users in Hungary.

On 22 April 2009, 26 applications became available on iwiw.hu. By mid-2009, users could choose from 65 applications.

In April 2010, iWiW introduced a service similar to Facebook connect. This allowed users to log in to external websites using their iWiW credentials.

In July 2010, iWiW introduced its mobile application for iPhone and Android.

On May 15, 2014 Origo Zrt. announced it would close down iWiW permanently on June 30, 2014.

== See also ==
- List of social networking websites
