= Social learning network =

A social learning network (SLN) is a type of social network that results from interaction between learners, teachers, and modules of learning. The modules and actors who form the SLN are defined by the specific social learning process taking place.

The set of learners and the set of teachers in an SLN cannot be disjoint. Rather, an SLN is an evolving peer learning process in which learners acquire, master, and then themselves disseminate knowledge to others over time. At any given time, an actor in an SLN is a teacher of concepts she has mastered, and a learner of those she is not yet familiar with.

Collaborative learning has been identified as an important part of SLN formation, because actors can work together and combine their respective skills to solve problems.

== Applications ==
A number of learning scenarios that give rise to social learning networks have been identified. Some of these have a designated teacher and/or teaching staff, while others rely entirely on peer-based instruction:

- Massive open online courses (MOOCs), where learning content is created by a designated instructor and/or teaching staff, and the primary means of interaction between students are discussion forums. Since the student bodies of MOOC can reach hundreds of thousands in size, the teacher-to-student ratios are typically fractions of one percent. As a result of this, peer-based learning has been found to be critical to the scalability of the learning process.
- Flipped classrooms (FLIP), where class time is primarily used for discussion of course material, rather than as a traditional lecture period. Compared with MOOC, the SLN for FLIP will be at least partially formed through face-to-face communication.
- Training and development initiatives in which the instructor puts particular emphasis on social learning. For example, corporations will sometimes encourage enterprise social networking among employees and supply an internal networking service for this purpose.
- Question and answer sites (Q&A), where there is typically a common forum on which users can post questions, answer questions, comment on answers, and up/down-vote posts. The SLN on Q&A sites is formed entirely through social interaction on these forums.
- Review sites, where contributors learn from one another through a collective sharing of knowledge about experiences with items.

== Graph types ==
The structure and dynamics of a social learning network can be represented through a graph. Different combinations of node types and link/weight definitions will yield different properties about the network. Dynamic functionalities on top of these graphs, meaning how they evolve over time in terms of the number of nodes, links, and weights, can be captured too.

At least four graph types have been identified:

- Undirected graph of learners, where the nodes in the graph are learners, and the (possibly weighted) links are used to indicate the presence or absence of some characteristic(s) between them. These properties can be definitive measures, such as geographic location or whether they have interacted, or measures that may be more difficult to quantify, such as the number of concepts each learner has mastered in common.
- Directed graph of learners, where directed (and possibly weighted) links can be used to represent the flow of information between learners in a social network. These can take the form of a multigraph, because it is possible for there to be more than one interaction between two learners.
- Undirected graph of learners and concepts, where the concepts of discussion in the networks can also be represented as a second type of node. These concepts can be extracted from the discussions between learners by running content analysis on the discussions. One possible representation of the relationships between learners and concepts is through a bipartite graph.
- Directed graph of learners and concepts, where a graph that includes both learner and concept nodes is directed to indicate the flow of information through the network. Concept nodes can be used here to represent a post or a collection of posts.

== See also ==
- Social learning tools
