= Ameen =

Ameen is a masculine given name and surname of Arabic origin. Notable people with the name include:

== Given name ==
- Ameen Ali al-Akimi (born 1959), Yemeni politician
- Ameen Mohammad Albakri (born 1969), Yemeni Guantanamo detainee
- Ameen Al-Dakhil (born 2002), Iraqi-Belgian footballer
- Ameen Faheem (1940–2015), Pakistani politician and poet
- Ameen Faisal (born 1963), Maldivian politician
- Ameen-ud-Din bin Mohamed Ibrahim (1947–2015), Malaysian field hockey player
- Ameen Jubran (born 1984), Yemeni chemist
- Ameen Khan (born 1939), Indian politician
- Ameen Khosravian (born 1989), Iranian-American basketball player
- Ameen Nayfeh (born 1988), Palestinian film director and writer
- Ameen Mian Quadri (born 1955), Indian Sufi religious leader
- Ameen Rihani (1876–1940), Lebanese-American writer, intellectual, and political activist
- Ameen Albert Rihani (born 1942), Lebanese university professor, scholar, and administrator
- Ameen Salifu (born 1965), Ghanaian politician
- Ameen Sayani (1932–2024), Indian radio announcer
- Ameen Zakkar (born 1994), Syrian-Qatari handball player

== Surname ==
- A. R. Ameen (born 2003), Indian singer
- Aml Ameen (born 1985), English actor
- Hassan Ameen (born 1985), Emirati footballer
- Kanwal Ameen, Pakistani information theorist
- Mohamed Ameen (1910–1953), Maldivian politician
- Mohammed Ameen (born 1980), Saudi Arabian footballer
- Muhammad Afsarul Ameen (1952–2023), Bangladeshi politician
- Nihar Ameen, Indian swimming coach
- Robby Ameen (born 1960), American drummer and composer
- Sidra Ameen (born 1992), Pakistani cricketer

== See also ==
- Amen (disambiguation)
- Amin (disambiguation)
- Amine (disambiguation)
