= Amino (disambiguation) =

Amino is an adjective form of ammonia.

Amino may also refer to:

- Amino (app), an American online application
- Amino (surname), a Japanese surname
- Amino Station, a railway station in Kyōtango, Kyoto Prefecture, Japan

== See also ==
- Amino acid, a molecule that contains both amine and carboxyl functional groups
- Amino alcohol, a molecule that contains both an amine and an alcohol functional group
- Amino sugar, a sugar that contains an amine group in place of a hydroxyl group
- Amine (disambiguation)
