= Amina (disambiguation) =

Amina is a female given name.

It may also refer to:

== People and fictional characters ==
- Amina bint Wahb (c. 549–577), the mother of the Islamic prophet Muhammad
- Amina (Queen of Zazzau), also known as Aminatu, semi-legendary 16th-century Hausa queen in Zazzau, Nigeria

== Film and television ==
- Amina (1951 film), an Egyptian film
- Amina (1957 film), a submission to the 30th Academy Awards for Best Foreign Language Film
- Amina (2012 film), a Nigerian drama
- Amina (2021 film), a Nigerian film about the Queen of Zazzau
- Ameena (film), a 2024 Indian film

== Other uses ==
- Amina (magazine), a French-language magazine
- Amina – Chechen Republic Online, or Amina.com, a social network service

== See also ==
- Amiina, an Icelandic band
- Amin (disambiguation)
- Iman (Islam)
