= Barrie D'Rozario DiLorenzo =

- Company type: Private
- Industry: Advertising agency
- Founded: November 2006; 19 years ago in Minneapolis, Minnesota, United States
- Founders: Bob Barrie, Stuart D'Rozario; David Murphy
- Website: bdd.us

Barrie D'Rozario DiLorenzo, formerly Barrie D'Rozario Murphy, is a marketing and advertising agency in Minneapolis, Minnesota. It was founded in November 2006 by original partners Bob Barrie, Stuart D'Rozario and David Murphy. Before founding the agency, Barrie and D'Rozario worked at Fallon Worldwide where they were responsible for the award-winning United Airlines campaign "It's Time to Fly".

== Clients ==
Over the last 7 years, the agency has worked with a wide range of Fortune 500 companies including Dell Computer, Lands' End, Medtronic, Wagner Spray Tech, United Airlines, Best Buy, UnitedHealth Group, Optum, Bissell Inc., Chase Bank, Applied Materials, Compellent, Del Webb Homes, Chambers Hotel and the Sunset Marquis Hotel.

== Recognition ==
In 2009, a 30-minute film created by BD'D for the Chambers Hotel in Minneapolis won one of only two Gold Lions within the U.S. for film at the International Advertising Festival in Cannes, France. BD'D was also honored with the 2009 O'Toole Award for the "Best Small Agency" in the U.S., courtesy of the American Association of Advertising Agencies (4A's).

In 2013, BD'D gained national recognition for its "500 hours" initiative, which was featured in over 50 media channels nationally including the NBC Nightly News, MSN, The Today Show, USA Today and Huffington Post. (www.bdd.us/500hours)

In January 2014, Kevin DiLorenzo, former CEO at Olson, joined BD'D as partner and president. New BD'D offices in Chicago and Silicon Valley followed later in the year.

== See also ==
- AMIN Worldwide
- Advantage Solutions
