= San Francisco Fountain =

Fountain and sculpture by Ruth Asawa in San Francisco, California, U.S.

- Ruth Asawa's San Francisco Fountain, Hyatt on Union Square Fountain
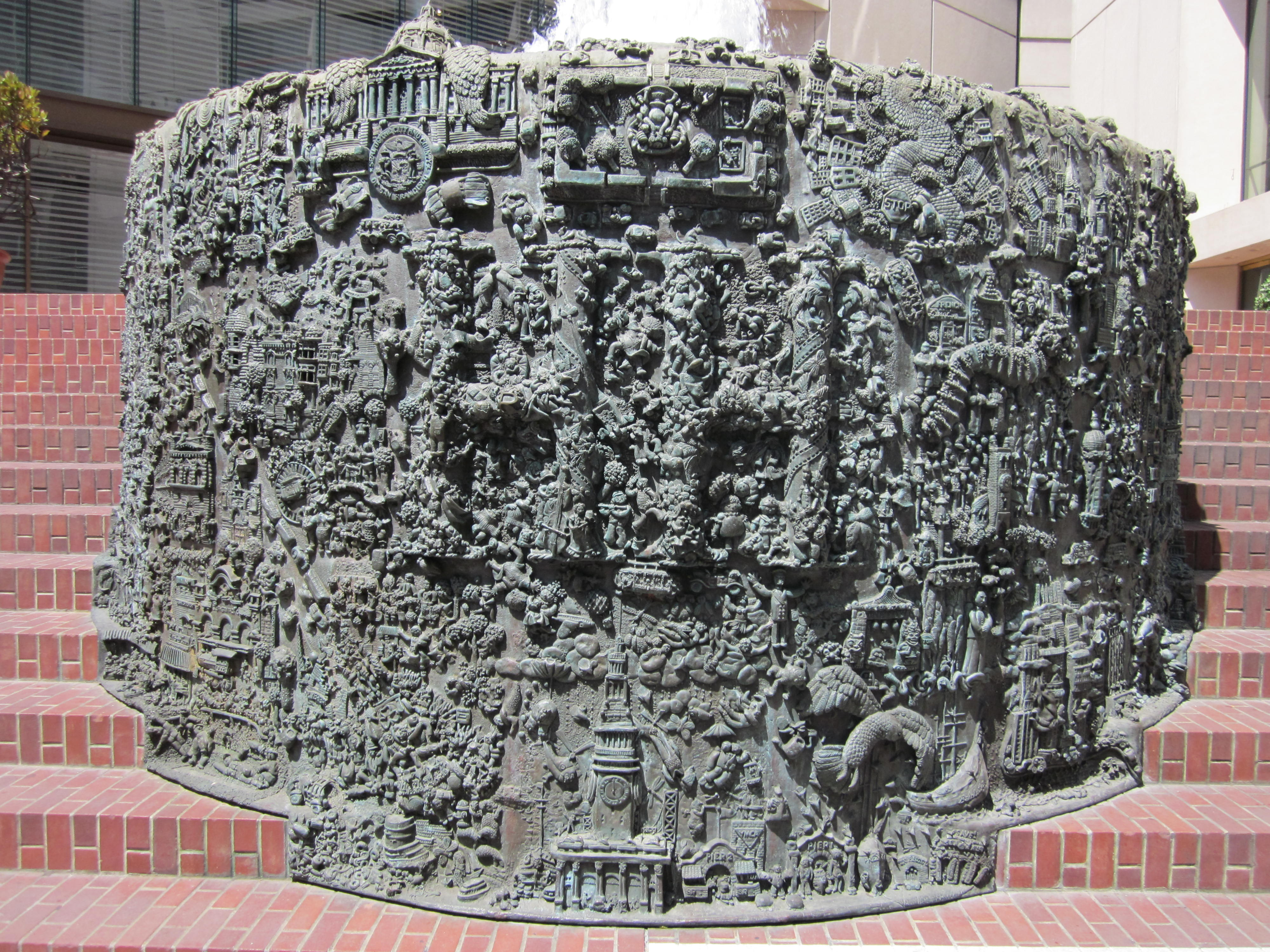
- San Francisco Fountain in 2010
- Artist: Ruth Asawa
- Completion date: 1970
- Type: Sculpture
- Medium: Bronze
- Dimensions: 2.3 m (90 in); 4.9 m diameter (193 in)
- Condition: "Treatment needed" (1992)
- Location: San Francisco, California, United States; 37.7890°N 122.4070°W
- Owner: Hyatt
- Website: ruthasawa.com/san-francisco-fountain-union-square-1970-1973/

San Francisco Fountain (Note: An adjacent plaque placed by Hyatt refers to "Ruth Asawa's San Francisco Fountain". Subsequent citogenesis has led to inaccurate use of this phrase as the sculpture's title. Historical sources also use the title Hyatt on Union Square Fountain or less commonly Children's Fountain. Asawa's papers clarify the correct title is simply San Francisco Fountain, which is used by recent sources and the Asawa estate.) is a bronze sculpture and fountain completed in 1970 by Ruth Asawa, located outside the Grand Hyatt San Francisco in downtown San Francisco, California, United States.

== Description and history ==
The cylinder-shaped sculpture, which serves as the outer wall of the fountain basin, features bas-relief scenes of San Francisco, "whimsically interrelated". It measures approximately 90 inches (2.3 m) tall, with a diameter of 193 inches (4.9 m), and is set into a base of brick stairs. Albert Lanier served as the architect; credited assistants include Aiko Asawa, Haru Awara, Mae Lee, Mei Mei, Hector Villanueva, and Sally Woodbridge.

Writing in The Journal of Modern Craft, Sue Archer described the genesis of the fountain:

(Asawa) became involved with the fountain project by chance: architect Chuck Bassett of the firm Skidmore, Owings and Merrill happened to see an exhibition at the California Redwood Association that featured sculpture by Asawa as well as work by some of the children who attended the Alvarado Elementary School. Bassett was part of the design team for the new Grand Hyatt San Francisco, and wanted to find an artist to help realize an engaging design for the fountain that was to sit just in front of the hotel's entrance. The children's work in the Redwood Association exhibition had been crafted from a substance Ruth called "baker's clay," an inedible mixture of flour, salt, and water, which could be worked like real ceramic and then "fired" in an ordinary oven. The children's works depicted scenes from daily life at Alvarado. Charmed, Bassett suggested that Asawa work with children from different parts of the city to create a large, low-relief for the fountain's exterior. The cast bronze cylinder that resulted bore the efforts of children and friends of Asawa's, including leaves fashioned by Ruth's mother, Haru Asawa.

The work was surveyed and labeled "treatment needed" by the Smithsonian Institution's Save Outdoor Sculpture! program in September 1992.

In May 2016, Apple Inc. completed construction of a new flagship store on the northwest corner of Post and Stockton Streets. The project included renovating the public space located between the new store and a hotel on the southwest corner of Sutter and Stockton Streets. The renovated public open space now includes wooden tables, chairs, planters with trees, a "living wall," a new multi-color "LOVE" sculpture and Ruth Asawa's San Francisco Fountain. Some restoration and preservation work on the fountain was done as part of the project.

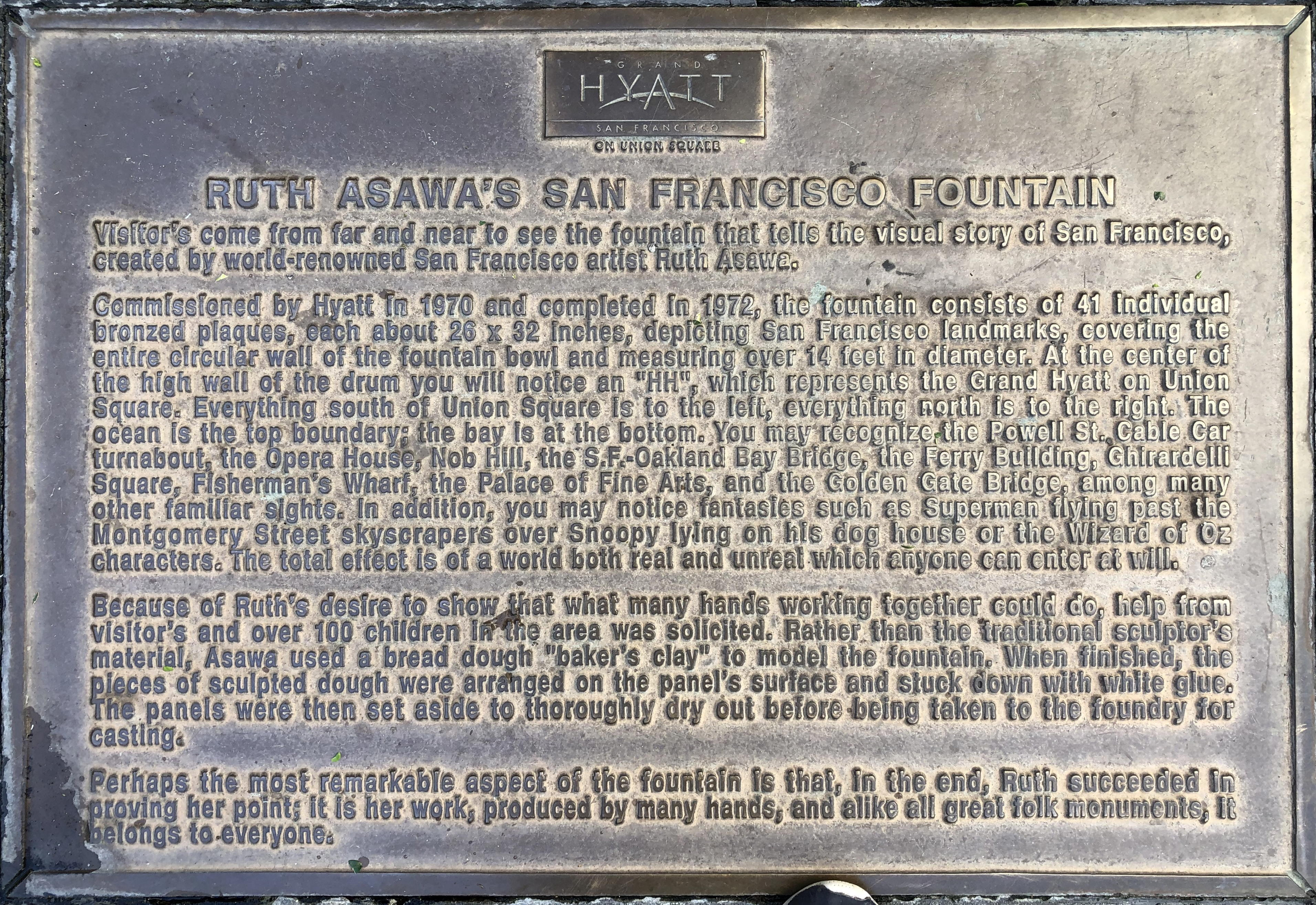
Sidewalk plaque for San Francisco Fountain.

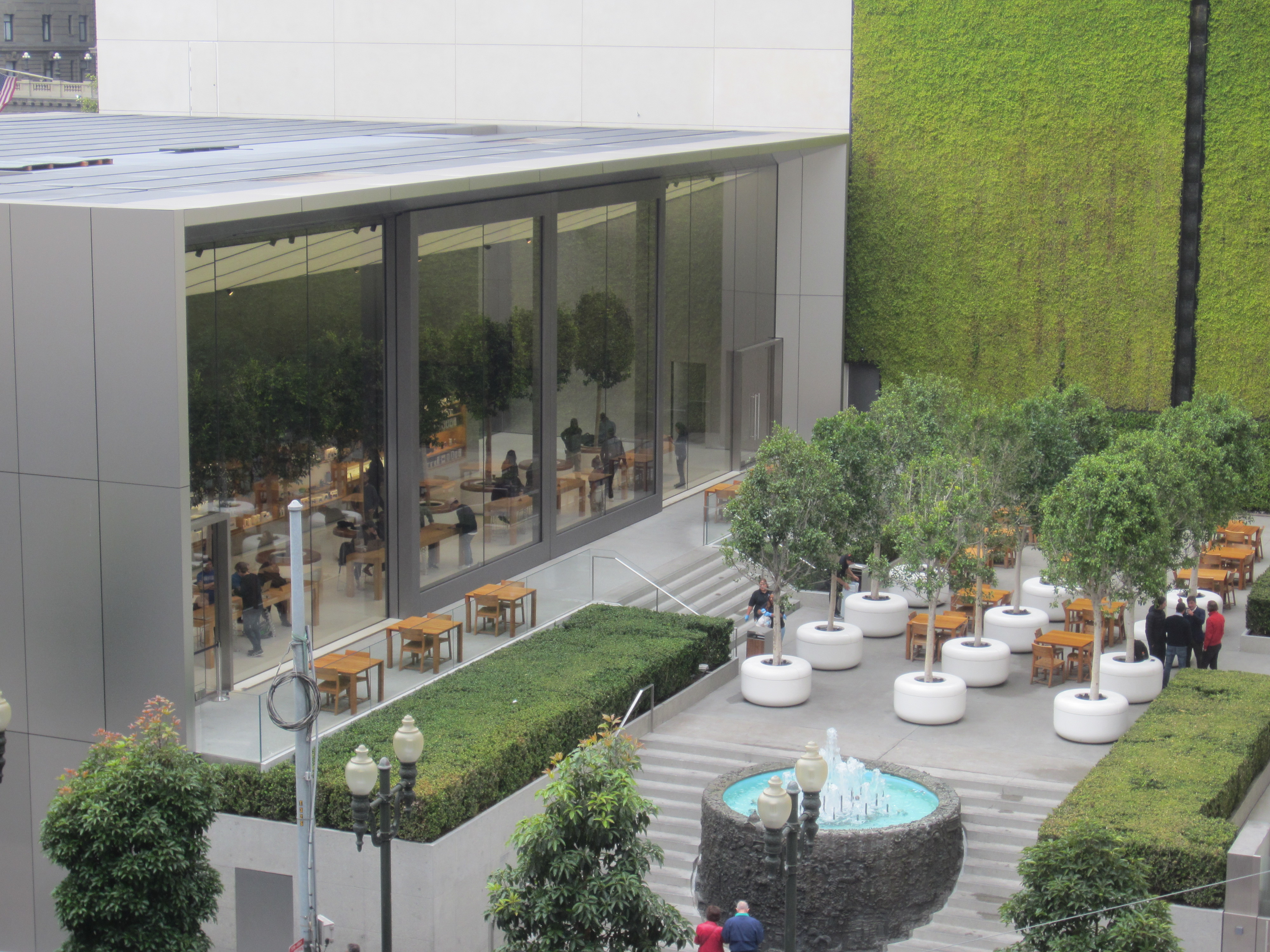
Apple Store on Union Square, back entrance and plaza.

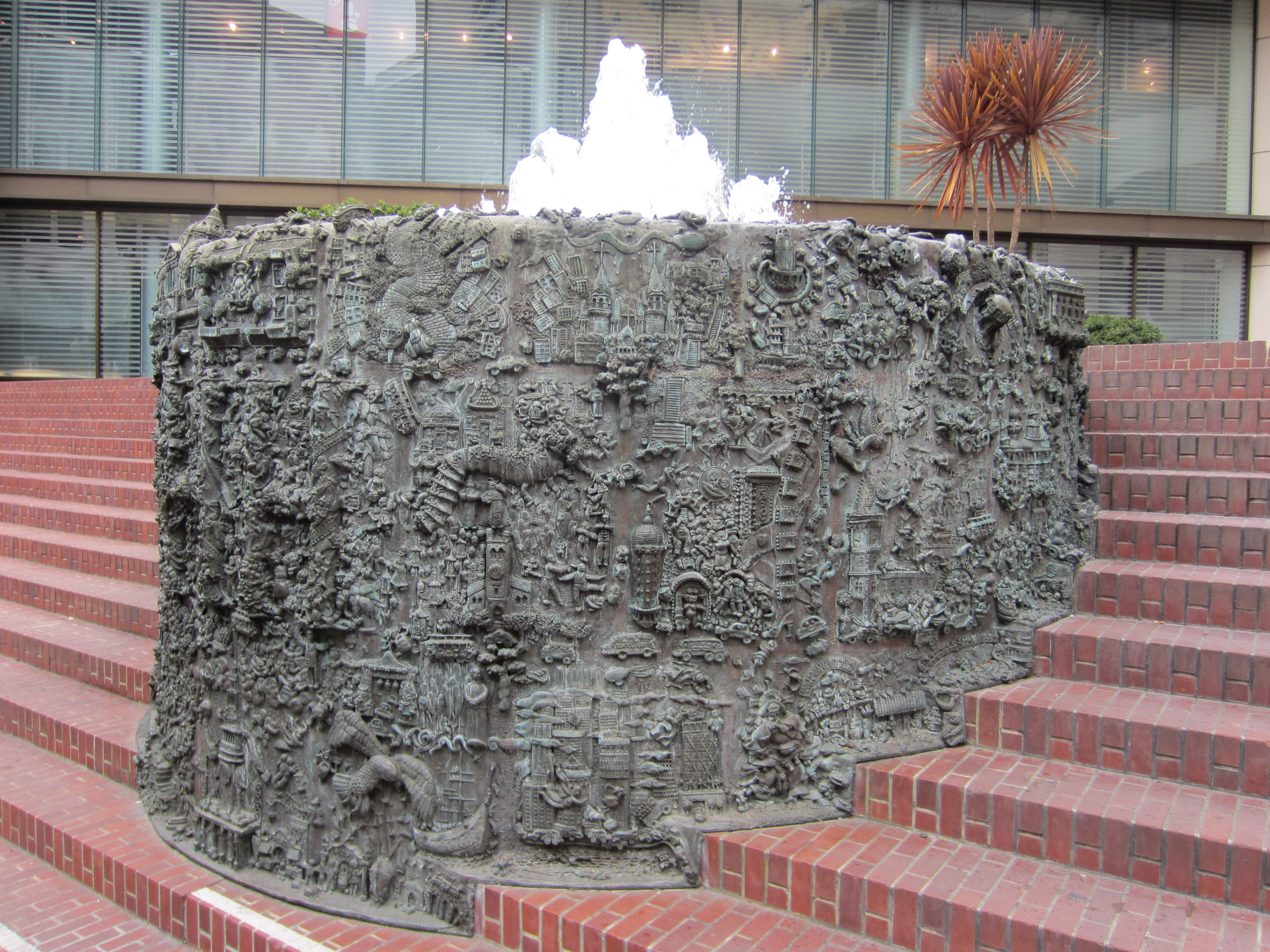
The fountain in 2013.

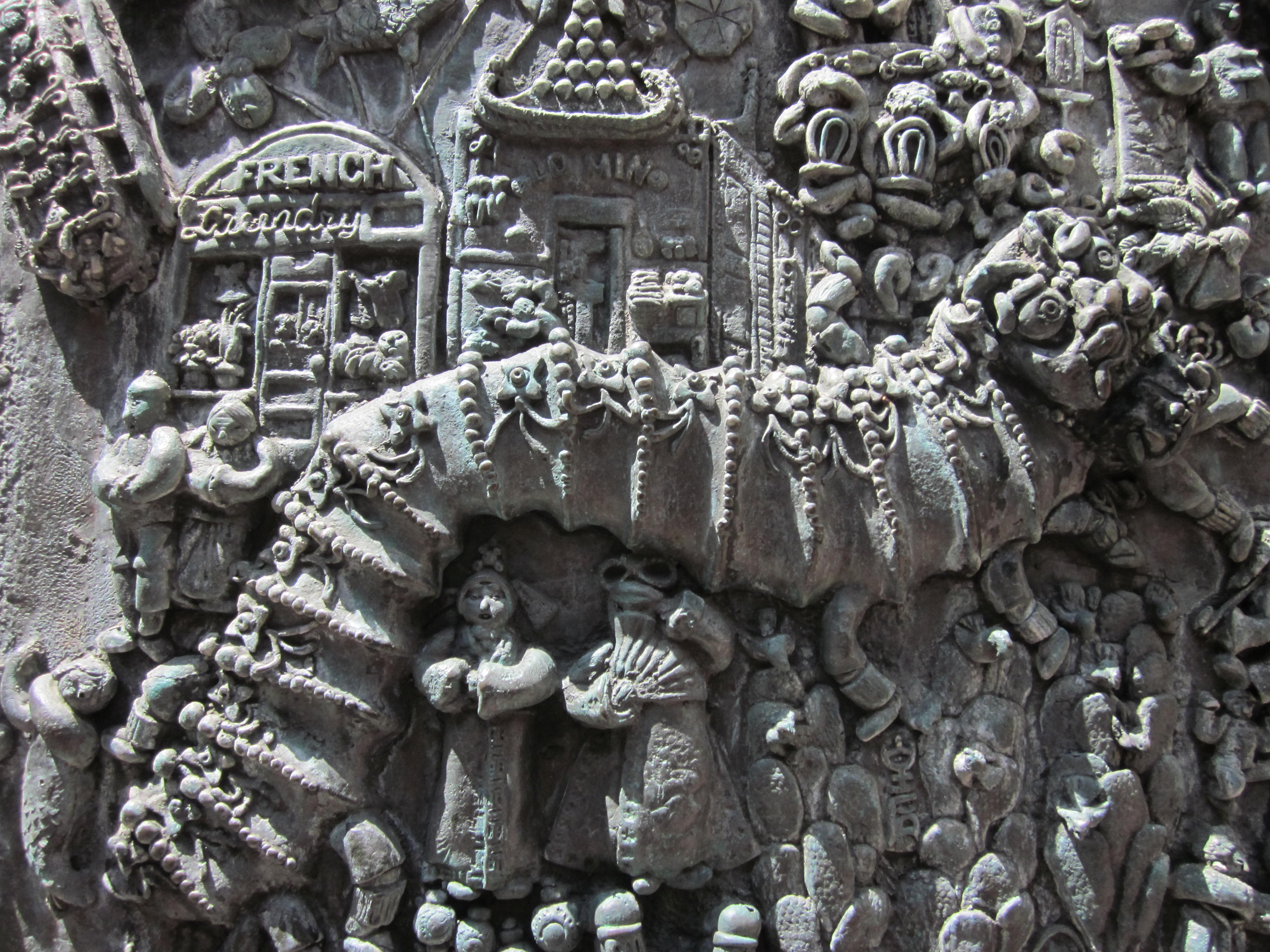
Detail: Chinese dragon

== See also ==
- History of fountains in the United States
