= Template network =

International network

The Template Network was once called the Emin Society or the Emin Foundation, and is now an international network of independent groups. As of 2014 there are some 1600 people regularly engaged within these groups worldwide in countries including Australia, Brazil, Canada, Denmark, England, Germany, Ireland, Israel, the Netherlands, New Zealand, Norway and the United States of America. Activities are diverse with interests including personal development, spirituality, psychology, meditation, music, dance, ecology, healing, sustainable development, evolution and health and well-being.

== Historical background ==
In 1971 a small number of people began to meet with Raymond Armin (1924 - 2002) to research the core issues of life, the universe and everything. The group called their activities "The Way" and later "The Emin".

By 1974 the group had 80 members; Raymond Armin was employed full-time by the society and a centre was rented for meetings at Gospel Oak in London. By 1976 a larger place was found at Putney. By 1977 there were 700 members in the UK.

=== Origins of the name ===
Emin is an Arabic word which means the faithful one.

In 1981 a request for verification of this from the London Central Mosque produced the response that Emin is a Europeanised variation of the Arabic: Ameen. The meanings attributed to the various forms of the word are: "trust", "faith", "worthy to be trusted", "truly", "reliable". It is also a form of the Hebrew word Amen and appears also in Christian usage with the meaning: "I concur" (used at the end of a prayer to signify that the words in the prayer are true and reliable, a statement of faith).

=== Origins of the philosophy ===
The Emin philosophy is the result of the work of Raymond Armin (AKA Leo), born in Camden Town, London, in 1924. As a child, Leo came to develop a deep conviction that everything that existed did so according to a core set of laws or principles; later he would call these the Natural Laws.

During the 1940s and 50's Leo married and had a family but maintained his on-going enquiry into the meaning and purpose of life. He spent much time researching in the British Museum and the British Library. In 1971 a number of young people met Leo and started meeting with him on a regular basis. They found him to have the ability to unlock perception into a huge range of subjects using a toolkit of techniques later referred to as groundwork.

Leo shared these techniques with the students and together they worked into new subjects as the topics arose during their regular meetings. To aid students in their own researches, Leo wrote papers explaining important concepts and these became known as the Emin archives. Using the natural laws, Leo was able to understand and explain even the most complicated of phenomena in a simple to grasp form - the basic premise being that natural laws are at the core of the appearance of everything.

As Leo continued to work with students, so the Emin philosophy developed and grew. The concept of universal templates developed out from the Emin philosophy and describes personal development according to 21 levels or stations.

== Philosophical content ==
The Emin represents an experimental spiritual philosophy. The first premise is the fact of a human life and all that it may do. The second premise is that human life's relationship with creation. Each individual is responsible for their own development and destiny. The Emin web site (see below) gives a good introduction to the philosophy.

=== Propositions ===
The philosophy contains work on many areas of life and contains many propositions that include:

- That the universe is governed by laws and is constantly evolving
- That the potential of a human lies within and can be brought out by development
- The human is not alone or arbitrary; rather, they are part of Creation and designed to integrate with that Creation.
- The very fact of being alive and conscious offers the possibility of intellectual and spiritual development, which is for any individual to take up, should they so wish.
- Each life is ultimately responsible for itself.
- Human knowledge derives in the first instance from the natural laws, and has aggregated throughout history. The continuing aggregation provides the basis for further development of the human faculty and possibility.

=== Sentiment ===
The idea of sentiment runs through much, if not all, of the Emin philosophy. The premise being that a person's sentiment towards anything, including themselves, will largely determine what type of relationship, dealing or interaction they might have with that thing. As an example, if a person has a good sentiment towards the planet then they will respect her and appreciate her processes and will want to help in issues that might affect her well being. And, a person's sentiment towards their partner will likewise determine the nature of that relationship. This can be extended and applied to any matter at all and is viewed as being fundamental to a person's spiritual journey especially where integration is concerned.

=== The archives ===
The above-mentioned subjects comprise what is often referred to as the Emin archives. Other components include writings on psychology and personal development, theology, history, meditation and various practical personal development exercises and so on…

=== Comparison to other philosophies ===
The philosophy was developed from original research - although certain elements of the philosophy have similarity to those found in Buddhism, Taoism, Shinto, the works of Gurdjieff and Rudolf Steiner, and other eastern and western philosophy and theology.

A number of the early archives (from the 1970s) borrow and develop concepts from Gurdjieff's work, and these include: The Ray of Creation, the Five Centres, Essence & Personality , Knowledge, Understanding & Being, Body Types, The Three Brains, States of Consciousness, Levels of existence, Cosmology and Laws.

== Practices ==
Exercises include mental and physical conditioning, reasoning, meditation and contemplation. They are designed to regulate and develop the different functional levels of the human system. Many exercises are designed to promote understanding of oneself and of others; and then there are exercises of a more fun nature designed to release stress.

An ingredient of the Emin way is to seek understanding in order to change the conduct of one's life to come into greater harmony with the higher, spiritual, self. There is, however, no ideal of ascetism or otherworldliness in the Emin – spirituality is to be realised through rather than at the cost of ordinary, human life in the world.

== Criticism ==
In 1980 the Emin was the subject of a series of lampoons in the magazine Private Eye. There was a follow-on article in the Daily Express.

Anti-cult groups have called the society secretive, and have complained that Emin archives are uninformative. The society responds that Emin archives are the product of philosophical and scientific studies and often occur in a graduated fashion from simple to more advanced so that the concepts are easier to grasp and the reader is not overwhelmed. The organisation explains that the practise of quoting subsections of text out of their original context does not lend to easy understanding by the casual observer. They say that complex language is sometimes required to cover abstract and difficult-to-master concepts although wherever possible, people try to keep it simple.

== Books ==
=== Emin and Template publications ===
Various books have been published in limited editions. They include:

- The trilogy of Leo's writings:
  - Frownstrong ISBN 0-904486-02-8 (1974)
  - Gemrod ISBN 0-904486-04-4 (1976)
  - Dear Dragon ISBN 0-904486-01-X (there are other, non-Emin, books which also use this title)
- The Blue Book Writings (Leo's poetry)
- Towards Yourself (Leo's sayings) (Leo, Sayings of Leo: Towards Yourself. London: Cobwebs Press, 1978.)
- Toir.
- The Beacon of Hope by Marion Verweij, Eminent Productions Limited 2002. ISBN 1-874717-05-2.
- A new Template of Human Qualities for the Future Bound Scientist by Anne Marmenout, Eminent Productions Limited. ISBN 1-874717-03-6.

Cobwebs Press is a name used to publish some Emin writings.
