= The Book of Khalid =

1911 novel by Ameen Rihani

- Title page, 1911 edition of The Book of Khalid
- Author: Ameen Rihani or Ameen Fares Rihani
- Language: English
- Genre: Bildungsroman, Arab-American literature
- Publisher: Dodd, Mead and Company
- Publication date: 1911
- Publication place: United States
- Media type: Print
- Pages: 349

The Book of Khalid (1911) is a novel by Arab-American writer Ameen Rihani. Composed during a sojourn in the mountains of Lebanon, it is considered to be the first novel by an Arab-American writer in English. His contemporary, Khalil Gibran, illustrated the work, and the story is often seen as an influence on Gibran's own well-known book The Prophet.

== Background ==
In his twenties around the turn of the century, Rihani was actively involved in the cultural scene of New York City, and he helped establish some of the earliest Arab-American literary societies. He published a collection of select quatrains of the poet Abul-'Ala into English in 1903 and wrote various essays and poetry in Arabic. In 1905, however, he returned to Lebanon and lived for a number of years in "mountain solitude." Yet he was not completely isolated and during this stay he lectured at local universities and released a number of essays, plays, and poems in Arabic. In 1910, he published Ar-Rihaniyat, a collection of essays that was positively received in the region and gave Rihani a strong reputation as a leading Arab intellectual. During this period, he also worked on The Book of Khalid, which, according to its final page, was finished at his home in Freike on January 12, 1910. The caption reads:

IN . FREIKE . WHICH . IS . IN . MOUNT . LEBANON
SYRIA . ON . THE . TWELFTH . DAY . OF
JANUARY . 1910 . ANNO . CHRISTI . AND . THE
FIRST . DAY . OF . MUHARRAM . 1328 . HEGIRAH
THIS . BOOK . OF . KHALID . WAS . FINISHED

In 1911, Rihani returned to New York and sent the manuscript to publishers. When Dodd Mead and Co. received the text, it reportedly consumed their offices more than other manuscripts received at the time. In an era when the increasingly diverse nature of immigration to the United States was a popular topic, the book was marketed as an evaluation of U.S. institutions by an immigrant that would appeal to "clever readers." Although the novel was not an extraordinary success in terms of sales, it received highly affirming reviews in journals like The Bookman and The Papyrus.

== Structure and style ==
Stamp Illustration for the Novel by Khalil Gibran

The novel is presented as a "found manuscript," a mechanism that recurs in other Arab-American fictional works. The narrator pieces the history together from an Arabic manuscript found in the Khedivial Library of Cairo and from interviews and the texts of other figures involved. The novel is divided into three books, dedicated in order "to Man," "to Nature," and "to God." Each section begins with an illustration by Gibran and a philosophical statement attributed to the protagonist Khalid.

The narrator speaks directly to "the Reader," elaborating the story's progression from the different sources available to him. The novel is highly descriptive and poetical in style, and the central characters are thoroughly developed. Rihani deploys numerous italicized Arabic words, and the work has been perceived as linking Western and Eastern literary forms. There are constant references to Western and Middle Eastern philosophers, writers, and intellectuals. Poetry, often attributed to the characters, is interspersed throughout the novel. There is also a wry and satirical humor deployed throughout the work, and Rihani's personal perspective on the merits of the protagonist's expressions can be difficult to ascertain at times.

== Plot ==
The novel, which is intensely autobiographical as Rihani himself immigrated as a child, tells the story of two boys, named Khalid and Shakib, from Baalbek in Lebanon (at the time, the Syrian province of the Ottoman Empire) who migrate together to the United States, coming by ship through Ellis Island and enduring the classic "Via Dolorosa" of an immigrant. They move into a wet cellar in the Little Syria community of Lower Manhattan near Battery Park and begin to peddle counterfeit Holy Land trinkets and religious items throughout the city, a typical Arab endeavor in America. While Shakib, although himself a poet, is focused and accumulates savings through peddling, Khalid becomes distracted and turns away from commercial activity toward frantically consuming Western literature and participating in the New York City intellectual and bohemian scene. At one point, he burns his peddling box, decrying the dishonesty of their sales.

After exhaustion from reckless "bohemian" pursuits, Khalid shifts towards party politics when he is offered the position of a functionary and ward for the Arab community in the machine politics of the city. However, Khalid insists on moral purity in his political work, causing conflict with his "Boss." As a result, he is jailed for a brief time of ten days (Shakib helps secure his release) under the charge of misapplying public funds. The two decide to return to Lebanon before long, and Khalid then shifts back to intense peddling for a time, paying off his accumulated debts and earning funds for return passage.

Describing the result of their return, Christoph Schumann has stated that "the subsequent course of events mirrors the progress of his American experience: spiritual retreat, political activism, and persecution." Khalid soon engages in a series of actions that anger Maronite clerics in his home city. He refuses to attend church services and spreads pamphlets and ideas seen as heretical. Moreover, he presses his wish to marry Najma, a young cousin, but Church leaders refuse to grant consent. As result of the growing conflict, Khalid is excommunicated. After burning the official excommunication order in the town square of Baalbek, he sets off a battle of opposing sides and is sent by Ottoman troops to a prison in Damascus. Meanwhile, Najma is forced by her father to marry an Ottoman official. After Khalid's release, Khalid moves to the mountain forests and starts to live as a hermit.

During this period of exile, he contemplates nature and integrates lessons learned in America with his views on the cultural and political dilemmas of the Arab world. He evolves into a self-identified "voice" for the Arabs, and chooses to return to spread his views on liberation from the Ottoman empire and on the importance of religious unity and scientific progress. Khalid travels to different cities engaging in political and spiritual speech, periodically writing letters to Shakib. During his travels, Khalid meets an American Baháʼí woman named Mrs. Gotfry with whom he discursively engages on questions of love and religion. He travels to Damascus where he speaks in the Great Mosque about his views of the West and of religious tradition, producing a riot and prompting the Ottoman authorities to pursue his arrest. He flees with Mrs. Gotfry to Baalbek, where he meets Shakib and learns that Najma, along with her young son, is abandoned and now ill. All of them (Khalid, Mrs. Gotfry, Najma, her son, and Shakib) flee together into the Egyptian desert to escape the Ottoman authorities. After an idyllic period in the desert of several months, Mrs. Gotfry and Shakib leave. Najma's son, Najid, dies suddenly of an unexpected illness, and Najma relapses and follows him in death in her grief. Khalid disappears and does not contact Shakib; his whereabouts are unknown.

== Major theme ==
The central theme of the novel is the attempt to reconcile the culture and values of "the West" and "the East," a universal concern in Rihani's work, and, indeed, entire approach to life. Khalid ruminates constantly on the merits and future destiny of America, which he connects to the Arab world in their own struggles with the Ottoman Empire and with religious intolerance and conflict. Like Rihani himself, who synthesized two distinct cultures perhaps more than almost any other writer of the time, Khalid, having experienced America (and considered its strength and weaknesses) during his stay of several years, returns and develops a philosophy that engages the Arab public directly. He is continually frustrated with America's materialism and inconsistent pursuit of its stated ideals, but he still believes that America represents a powerful force in the world's future evolution and that the Arab world can learn from its political ideals, relative respect for religion, and embrace of science and progress. Although these expressions result in his own persecution, he emerges as a modern prophet with a combined political, cultural, and spiritual message.

== Reputation ==
2011 was the centennial anniversary of the novel's publication, which has been seen as significant given the attributed merit of the work and its notability as the first Arab-American novel. As a result, there was an attempt to publicize and promote the work, which many believed to have been understudied, especially in comparison with the extraordinary popular The Prophet. A commemorative book, 100 Years of Selected Writings on Ameen Rihani's The Book of Khalid, edited and introduced by Paul Jahshan, was published by Platform International in 2011. Commemorative events took place at the Library of Congress, the New York Public Library, and Graduate Center, CUNY.

In 2009, the Arab Radio and Television Network's television show "What's Happening?" (moderated by Will Youmans and other hosts) had a segment on the novel with Todd Fine, a Harvard graduate who has digitized the work and entered it into Project Gutenberg. With a follow-up effort called "Project Khaled", he made plans to create a new educational edition of the novel and promote the 2011 anniversary.

In March 2012 Melville House Publishing issued an edition of The Book of Khalid which includes Kahlil Gibran's illustrations and an essay by Todd Fine. The book also includes a HybridBook component, linking to free download of ten essays written by Ameen Rihani. Among the ten essays is "From Concord to Syria" which addresses themes similar to the ones in The Book of Khalid.

In 2016, Syracuse University Press published a critical edition of the novel edited by Todd Fine, which includes a glossary. Contributors include Geoffrey Nash, Christoph Schumann, Layla Al Maleh, Waïl S. Hassan, Youssef Choueiri, Nathan C. Funk, Hani Bawardi, and Ameen Albert Rihani.

== See also ==
- Ameen Rihani bibliography
- Italian Translation: Ameen Rihani, Il Libro di Khalid, illustrazioni originali di K. Gibran, traduzione e cura di F. Medici, prefazione di P. Branca, postfazione di K.F. Allam, Mesogea, Messina 2014 (preview).
