= Ameno =

Ameno may refer to:

- Ameno, Italy, a comune in the Province of Novara, Piedmont, Italy
- Lacco Ameno, a town and comune situated in the northwest of the island of Ischia, in the Gulf of Naples, Italy
- "Ameno" (song), a song by musical project Era

== See also ==
- Amen
- Amen (disambiguation)
- Ameno-sagiri, a character in the video game Shin Megami Tensei: Persona 4
