= Ruth's Table =

Coordinates: 37°45′26″N 122°25′06″W

- Types: arts centre
- Website: www.ruthstable.org

Ruth's Table is an art gallery and arts center in San Francisco.

== History ==
Ruth's Table was founded in 2009 as a community arts initiative for seniors at Bethany House, a home for seniors in the Mission District of San Francisco. It was named after artist Ruth Asawa, who donated her living room table to the program. In 2019, it moved to its own building on 21st street.

== Exhibitions and Programming ==
Ruth's Table has exhibited various artists and groups focusing on care and disability culture. Their educational programming focuses on intergenerational art making.
