= Amino (surname) =

- Language: Japanese

Origin
- Meaning: 網 means rope and 野 means wild or field
- Region of origin: Japan

Amino (written: 網野 or アミノ in katakana) is a Japanese surname. Notable people with the surname include:

- Kiku Amino (網野 菊; 1900–1978), Japanese writer and translator
- Leo Amino (1911–1989), American sculptor
- Masao Amino (網野 正大; born 1974), Japanese rugby union player and coach
- Tetsurō Amino (アミノ テツロー; born 1955), Japanese anime director
- Tomoo Amino (網野 友雄; born 1980), Japanese basketball player
- Yoshihiko Amino (網野 善彦; 1928–2004), Japanese Marxist historian
