= Amen (disambiguation) =

Amen is a declaration of affirmation found in the Hebrew Bible and New Testament.

Amen may also refer to:

== Arts and entertainment ==
=== Film and television ===
- Amen., a 2002 historical drama film
- Amen (2010 film), an Indian short film
- Amen (2011 film), a South Korean drama
- Amen (2013 film), a Malayalam film
- Amen (TV series), an American sitcom 1986–1991

=== Music ===
==== Performers ====
- Amen (American band)
- Amen (Peruvian band)
- Amen (musician) (Jussi Sydänmaa, born 1972), a Finnish guitarist

==== Albums ====
- Amén, a 2000 album by Azúcar Moreno
- Amen!, a 1958 album by Della Reese
- Amen (Amen album), 1999
- Amen (Paula Cole album), 1999
- Amen (Rich Brian album), 2018
- Amen (Salif Keita album), 1991
- Amen (So Be It), a 1999 album by Paddy Casey
- Amen (Igorrr album), upcoming; 2025

==== Songs ====
- "Amen" (gospel song), a traditional song, popularized by The Impressions with their 1964 version
- "Amen" (Ana Soklič song), the Slovenian entry in the Eurovision Song Contest 2021
- "Amen" (Drake song), 2023
- "Amen" (Edens Edge song), 2011
- "Amen" (For King & Country song), 2021
- "Amen" (Francesco Gabbani song), 2015
- "Amen" (Halestorm song), 2015
- "Amen" (Kid Rock song), 2007
- "Amen" (Meek Mill song), 2012
- "Amen" (Shaboozey and Jelly Roll song), 2025
- "Amen!" (Krista Siegfrids song), 2013
- "Amen!" (song), by Bring Me the Horizon, 2023
- "Amen" (Vincent Bueno song), the Austrian entry in the Eurovision Song Contest 2021
- "Amen", a song by Sepultura, from Chaos A.D.
- "Amen", a song by Kid Cudi from Speedin' Bullet 2 Heaven
- "Amén", a song from Amén (Azúcar Moreno album)
- "Amen", a song from Behemoth, from The Satanist
- "Amen", a song by Beyoncé from Cowboy Carter
- "Amen", a song from Decapitated, from Anticult
- "Amen", a song by Enigma from the 2016 album The Fall of a Rebel Angel
- "Amen", a song by Falz from Moral Instruction
- "Amen", by Todrick Hall from Haus Party, Pt. 1
- "Amen", a song by Jme from the 2015 album Integrity>
- "Amen", a song by Liora, the Israeli entry in the Eurovision Song Contest 1995
- "Amen", a song by Monsta X from the 2016 EP Rush
- "Amen", a song by Mike Posner from his 2019 album A Real Good Kid
- "Amen", a song by Pusha T from the 2011 album Fear of God II: Let Us Pray

== People ==
- Amen Brown (born c. 1987), American politician
- Amen Santo, athlete and actor
- Amen Ogbongbemiga (born 1998), American football player
- Amen Edore Oyakhire (born 1945), Nigerian government official
- Amen Thompson (born 2003), American basketball player
- Amen Allah Tissaoui (born 2004), Tunisian Paralympic athlete
- Daniel Amen (born 1954), American celebrity doctor
- Irving Amen (1918–2011), American artist
- Jeanne Amen (1863–1923), French painter
- John Amen (1898–1960), chief Interrogator during the Nuremberg War Trials
- José Amén-Palma (born 1926), Ecuadorian surgeon and medical researcher
- Paul Amen (1916–2005), American athlete and banker
- Robert Amen (born 1950), American businessman
- Woody van Amen (born 1936), Dutch artist

== Other uses ==
- Amen (website), a defunct social network
- Amen, Netherlands, a village
- Amen: The Awakening, a game
- Amun or Amen, an Ancient Egyptian deity

== See also ==
- Aman (disambiguation)
- Amin (disambiguation)
- Amon (disambiguation)
- Amun (disambiguation)
- Amen break, a drum break
