= Ameen Rihani bibliography =

The following is a list of works by Ameen Rihani

== Arabic ==
=== Philosophical, literary, social, and political essays and letters ===
- 1910 – The Rihani Essays (Ar-Rihaniyyaat) الريحانيات
- 1956 (posthumous) – Nationalisms (Al-Qawmiyat) القوميات
- 1957 (posthumous) – Eastern and Western Figures (Wujuh Sharkiya Gharbiya) وجوه شرقية غربية
- 1957 (posthumous) – Literature and Art (Adab wa Fan) أدب وفن
- 1959 (posthumous) – The Arabic Letters of Ameen Rihani (Rasa’el Ameen Ar-Rihani Al-‘Arabiya) رسائل أمين الريحاني العربية
- 1961 (posthumous) – Seeds for Planters (Budhur Liz-Zari’een) بذور للزارعين
- 1980 (posthumous) – Writings of Early Days (Shadharat Min ‘Ahd-is Siba) شذرات من عهد الصبا
- 1982 (posthumous) – My Will (Wasiyati) وصيّتي

=== Historical and political analysis ===
- 1902 – Treatise of the French Revolution (Nubdha fi ath-Thawra al-Faransiya) نبذة في الثورة الفرنسية
- 1924 – Kings of the Arabs (Muluk al-Arab) ملوك العرب
- 1928 – Disasters (An-Nakabat) النكبات
- 1928 – Extremism and Reform (At-Tatarrof wa'l-Islah) التطرّف والإصلاح
- 1928 – The Modern History of Najd (Tareekh Najd al-hadith) تاريخ نجد الحديث
- 1934 – Faysal the First (Faysal al-awwal) فيصل الأوّل
- 1935 – The Heart of Iraq (Qalb al-‘Iraq) قلب العراق

=== Allegory ===
- 1903 – The Trilateral Treaty in the Animal Kingdom (Al-Muhalafa ath-thulatiya fi'l-mamlaka al-hayawaniya) المحالفة الثلاثية في المملكة الحيوانية

=== Short story ===
- 1904 – The Muleteer and the Monk (Al-Makari wa'l-kahen) المكاري والكاهن

=== Novel ===
- 1914 – The Lily of Al-Ghore (Zanbakat al-Ghawr) زنبقة الغَور

=== Literary criticism ===
- 1933 – You the Poets (Antum ash-shu’ara’) أنتم الشعراء
- 1980 (posthumous) – My Story with May (Qissati ma’a May) قصتي مع مي

=== Plays and short stories ===
- 1934 – Faithful Time (Wafa’ az-zaman) وفاء الزمان
- 1951 (posthumous) – The Register of Repent (Sijil at-tawba) سجل التوبة

=== Travel ===
- 1947 (posthumous) – The Heart of Lebanon (Qalb Lubnan) قلب لبنان
- 1952 (posthumous) – The Far Morocco (Al-Magreb al-Aqsa) المغرب الأقصى
- 1952 (posthumous) – The Illumination of Andalusia (Nur al-Andalus) نور الأندلس

=== Poetry ===
- 1955 (posthumous) – Hymn of the Valleys (Hutaf al-awdiya) هتاف الأودية (free verse in Arabic).
- Hymns of the Valleys. Trans. Naji Oueijan. New Jersey: Gorgias Press, 2002.

== English ==
=== Novels, short stories, and plays ===
- 1911 – The Book of Khalid
- 2001 (posthumous) – Wajdah
- 1911–1921 (manuscript) – The Green Flag
- 1914 (manuscript) – The Lily of al-Ghore
- 1917 (posthumous) – Jahan
- 1918 (manuscript) – Doctor Della Valle

=== Political and cultural essays and letters ===
- 1921 – The Path of Vision
- 2001 (posthumous) – Letters to Uncle Sam
- 2002 (posthumous) – The White Way and the Desert
- 2008 (posthumous) – The Pan Arab Movement
- 1897–1940 (manuscript) – The English Letters of Ameen Rihani

=== Poetry ===
- 1903 – The Quatrains of Abu'l-Ala
- 1905 – Myrtle and Myrrh
- 1918 – The Luzumiyat of Abul-'Ala
- 1921 – A Chant of Mystics, and Other Poems
- 2009 (posthumous) – Waves of My Life and Other Poems

=== Travel writings ===
- 1930 – Around the Coasts of Arabia
- 1930 – Arabian Peak and Desert
- 1918–1919 (manuscript) – In the Lands of the Mayas
- 1932 (manuscript) – Kurdistan

=== Historical and political analysis ===
- 1920 – The Descent of Bolschevism
- 1928 – Maker of Modern Arabia or Ibn Saoud of Arabia, His People and His Land
- 1967 (posthumous) – The Fate of Palestine
- 2008 (posthumous) – The Pan Arab Movement
- 1915–1917 (manuscript) – Turkey and Islam in the War
- 1932 (manuscript) – Iraq During the Days of King Faisal the First

=== Art ===
- 1999 (posthumous) – Critiques in Art

=== Literary studies ===
- 2002 (posthumous) – The Lore of the Arabian Nights
- 2008 (posthumous) – Arabia’s Contribution to Civilization
