= Emin (esoteric movement) =

Spiritual movement

The Emin
- Formation: 1973
- Founder: Raymond Armin
- Type: New religious movement / esoteric movement
- Headquarters: London, England (originally)
- Region served: United Kingdom, United States, Israel, and others

The Emin or The Emin Society is a spiritual movement based on the work of Raymond Armin, known to members as "Leo". Originally, the Emin was named The Eminent Way or The Way. The movement arose in the 1970s. The Template Network is a movement which offers activities inspired by the Emin philosophy. The Emin has been described as a cult in books such as William Shaw's Spying in Guru Land: Inside Britain's Cults.

== History ==
The movement started in London in 1973. It was first known as the Emin society and then Eminent Way, which was later abbreviated to "Emin". In 1977 an Israeli branch emerged, and a center was established in a Tel Aviv neighborhood in 1980. By 1978 there were also groups in the USA, Canada and Australia.

In Israel, Emin members established a village called Ma'ale Tzviya in 1986. Over the years The Emin has had gatherings in many countries including Ireland, France, Greece, Italy, Germany, Denmark, Sweden, the Netherlands, Brazil, and New Zealand.

=== Raymond Armin (Leo) ===
Raymond Armin was born in London (1924) under the name Schirtenlieb. He did most of his schooling in London, living around the St.Johns Wood area. He started his working life as an apprentice tool maker at Borehamwood near London England. Armin did time during the war in the R.A.F. as a quartermaster. (His rank was staff sergeant). He married Violet Burton from Waterloo who was 8 months pregnant at the time.

After the war, Armin worked at various locations in and round London e.g. as manager of a furniture company based in Camden Town, London, and then as a market demonstrator. During the late 1940s, while still living in central London, he became father to five children, one died soon after birth; his name was Brian.

He relocated in 1958 to Yorkshire to follow a new profession as a travelling salesman, selling furniture polish, and then a few years later as an encyclopaedia salesman. In 1963 Armin moved to Nottinghamshire, followed by a move back to London in 1965, where he worked as a civilian driver for the Metropolitan Police and then as a guard for a security firm.

In 1971 John Armin, son of Leo met up with a group of people who were staying in London after travelling around the world "looking for something". They formed into a group under the Armins' leadership, and all met regularly over the next few years, primarily at Leo's flat in Stoke Newington, London.

In 1973, "the Group" began. This would adopt the name of the Emin Society, at which time Armin became known as Leo and John as Orman within the society. The society used many halls around the London areas, eventually occupying a small centre at Gospel Oak in London. Autumn of 1976 saw a relocation to a larger centre at Hotham Road Studios, Hotham Road, Putney, London.

During the 1980's, Armin moved with his wife, Violet, and a woman called Ethra a.k.a. Deborah McKay, from Iowa, to America, where some years later they took on American citizenship.

From roughly the 1990's until his death, Armin lived in a waterfront retreat at Jensen Beach Florida. Armin died in August 2002 from an aortic aneurysm. Violet Armin (Ruth) died in 2008 in her sleep.

The Emin was founded by members of the Armin family, followed by a gathering of friends interested in Orman's and Leo's work.

== Philosophy ==
=== The Archives ===
Armin has left numerous lectures, written and recorded on audio and video tape. These include writings on psychology and personal development, theology, cosmology, history, meditation, and various practical personal development and perception exercises. Most, but not all, of these writings were written by Armin.

=== The Template ===
The Template is a philosophical concept, introduced by Armin in 1992. It describes the spiritual development of the non-physical body through a hierarchically structured system of 16 spheres. Every sphere, with a symbolic name like amethyst or ruby, represents a level of consciousness.

== Controversies ==
Raymond Armin known as Leo cohabited with both his wife and another woman in what was believed to be a sexual relationship. The second woman was considerably younger by decades than Raymond Armin at the time this began. Emin members were told that John Armin, known as Orman, had a sexual relationship with one of the member’s daughters, leading to his banishment at the time from the society. His other son was also understood by members to be in a relationship with two women. Former members have made allegations against all three of predatory and sexualised behaviour.

Women in the Emin Society were encouraged to be domesticated and see themselves principally as companions, under the term ‘consolata’.

Financial Impropriety

Many Emin members cast doubt on the ethics of subscription fees charged for membership which were high in comparison to other membership societies of the time.

The Armin family home at 1592 Seahorse Pl Jensen Beach, FL 34957 purchased in Florida reflected Raymond Armin’s wealthy economic status after a number of years as the chief recipient of the profits from subscription membership and ‘archive’ (written material) sales.

== Offshoots ==
=== The Template Network ===
The Template Network is an affiliation of groups involved with the Emin philosophy. It is an international network of independent groups, with interests including education, art, ecology, well-being, science and spirituality. As of 2009 there were some 1700 people regularly engaged within these groups. There are groups in Australia, Brazil, Canada, Denmark, France, Germany, Israel, Italy, the Netherlands, New Zealand, Norway, Sweden, the United Kingdom, and United States. In the UK some of the groups make use of buildings and facilities run by the Template Foundation. There are also several independent organisations and companies offering courses on a commercial basis, that draw on Emin concepts and practices. These include Blue Rose Wellness, an Emin/Template center of spiritual healing, located in Brier, Washington state, United States, and the Ruby Care Foundation, an Emin/Template charity group concerned with grief and loss management.

One premise held by Template Network groups is that creation is continuously evolving and that human life is part of that evolution. Another is that human life is an opportunity to consciously find one's own purpose within that evolution. Each individual is responsible for his or her own development and destiny.

=== Gemrod Foundation ===
In 1985, Emin established a centre in Leiden, Netherlands. In the 1990s it founded the Gemrod Foundation, which organized esoteric workshops, e.g. courses on clairvoyance and aura reading.

== Books ==
=== Emin and Template publications ===
- The trilogy of Leo's writings:
  - Frownstrong ISBN 0-904486-02-8 (1974)
  - Gemrod ISBN 0-904486-04-4 (1976)
  - Dear Dragon ISBN 0-904486-01-X (1976)
- The Blue Book Writings (Leo's poetry)
- Sayings of Leo: Towards Yourself (Cobwebs Press, London 1978.)
- Cobwebs & Tears: A Study to Inform & Prepare ISBN 0-904486-12-5 (Regal Print Company, London 1982)
- Toir.
- The Tear by John Turner, Eminent Productions Limited 2003. ISBN 1-874717-06-0.
- The Beacon of Hope by Marion Verweij, Eminent Productions Limited 2002. ISBN 1-874717-05-2.
- A New Template of Human Qualities for the Future Bound Scientist by Anne Marmenout, Eminent Productions Limited. ISBN 1-874717-03-6.

=== Books inspired by the Template ===
- The Seven Steps of Spiritual Intelligence by Richard A. Bowell, Boston, Nicholas Brealey Publishing 2004 ISBN 1-85788-344-6. The back of the title page reads: This book has been derived from and inspired by the philosophical writings and researches of Leo Armin under the title of the "Template".

=== Books by outside observers ===
- Despair and Deliverance – private salvation in contemporary Israel by Benjamin Beit-Hallahmi, State University of New York 1992 ISBN 0-7914-1000-5. The book analyzes various religious groups in Israel from a psychological and sociological perspective, inside the contemporary Israeli context of the 1970's.
