= Ma'ale Tzviya =

Ma'ale Tzviya: מַעֲלֵה צְבִיָּה (Hebrew)
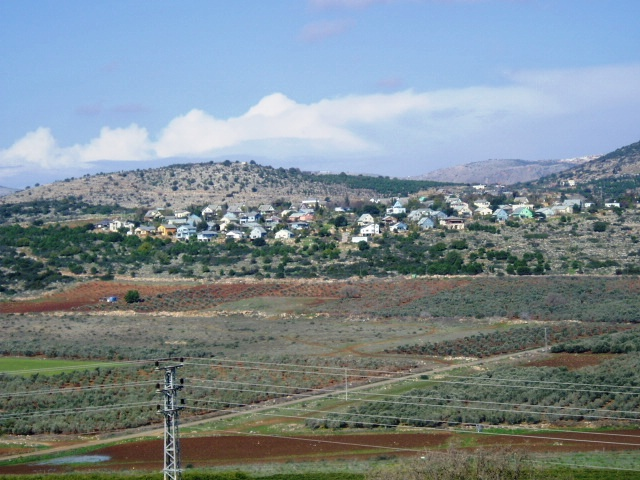

- Location within Northwest Israel Location within Israel
- Coordinates: 32°53′22″N 35°19′53″E
- Country: Israel
- District: Northern
- Subdistrict: Acre
- Council: Misgav
- Founded: 1979
- Founder: Polish Gar'inim
- Population (2024): 263

Ma'ale Tzviya (Hebrew: מַעֲלֵה צְבִיָּה, lit. 'Zvia Heights'), also Tzviya, is a community settlement in northern Israel. Located in the Galilee to the south-east of Karmiel, it falls under the jurisdiction of Misgav Regional Council. In 2024 it had a population of 263.

== History ==
The village was established in 1979 as a kibbutz, and was named after Zivia Lubetkin, one of the leaders of the Jewish underground in Nazi-occupied Warsaw. The kibbutz was closed in 1986 and the site taken over by members of the "Atid" (lit. Future) gar'in, who founded a community settlement with the assistance of the Jewish Agency.

The founders defined the settlement as "a Jewish Israeli settlement according to the way of Emin".
