= Ruth Asawa =

American sculptor (1926–2013)

- Asawa in 1952
- Born: Ruth Aiko Asawa; January 24, 1926; Norwalk, California, U.S.
- Died: August 5, 2013 (aged 87); San Francisco, California, U.S.
- Education: Black Mountain College
- Known for: Sculpture
- Spouse: Albert Lanier (m. 1949; died 2008)
- Children: 6
- Website: ruthasawa.com

Ruth Aiko Asawa (Japanese: 浅和 愛子, Hepburn: Asawa Aiko; January 24, 1926 – August 5, 2013) was an American modernist artist primarily known for her abstract looped-wire sculptures inspired by natural and organic forms. In addition to her three-dimensional work, Asawa created figurative and abstract drawings and prints influenced by nature, particularly flowers and plants.

Born in Norwalk, California in 1926 to Japanese immigrant parents, Asawa was the fourth of seven children and grew up on a truck farm. In 1942, her family was sent to different Japanese internment camps as a result of U.S. isolation policies during World War II. At the Rohwer War Relocation Center, Asawa learned to draw from animators who previously worked at Walt Disney Studios interned there. In 1943, she was able to leave the camp to attend Milwaukee State Teachers College on scholarship. Hoping to become a teacher, Asawa was ultimately unable to, as her Japanese ancestry prevented her from obtaining a teaching position in Wisconsin.

In 1945, Ruth and her older sister traveled outside of the U.S. to study in Mexico. She was taken by the colors and arts there. It was during her second trip to Mexico in 1947 that she learned the knitted-wire loop technique from a Mexican teacher, which she used to make the sculptures for which she is most famous

Eventually in 1946, Asawa joined the avant-garde artistic community at Black Mountain College, where she studied under German-American Bauhaus painter and color theorist Josef Albers, as well as the American architect and designer Buckminster Fuller. At Black Mountain College, Asawa began making looped-wire sculptures inspired by the basket crocheting technique she learned on a 1947 trip to Mexico. In 1955, she held her first exhibition in New York. By the early 1960s, Asawa had achieved commercial and critical success and became an advocate for public art, saying, "art for everyone." Asawa was the driving force behind the creation of the San Francisco School of the Arts, which was renamed the Ruth Asawa San Francisco School of the Arts in 2010.

Her work is featured in collections at the Solomon R. Guggenheim Museum and the Whitney Museum of American Art in New York City. Fifteen of Asawa's wire sculptures are on permanent display in the tower of San Francisco's de Young Museum in Golden Gate Park, and several of her fountains are located in public places in San Francisco. In 2019, Asawa and her work was the subject of the Google Doodle celebrating Asian American Pacific Islander Month in the U.S. In 2020, the U.S. Postal Service honored her work by producing a series of ten stamps that commemorate her well-known wire sculptures.

== Early life and education ==
Ruth Aiko Asawa was born in 1926 in Norwalk, California. The fourth of seven children, her parents, immigrants from Japan, operated a truck farm that produced walnuts and dairies until the Japanese American internment during World War II. Besides Asawa's father, the family was interned at an assembly center at the Santa Anita racetrack for much of 1942. After 1942, they were sent to the Rohwer War Relocation Center in Arkansas. Asawa said about the internment:

I hold no hostilities for what happened; I blame no one. Sometimes good comes through adversity. I would not be who I am today had it not been for the internment, and I like who I am.

Asawa became interested in art at an early age. As a child, her third grade teacher encouraged her to create her own artwork. At the internment camp, her family was also detained alongside a group of artists from the Walt Disney studios, who led classes for children in the camp.

Following her graduation from the internment center's high school, Asawa received a scholarship from a Quaker organisation to attend Milwaukee State Teachers College to become an art teacher, whilst working as live-in-servant to fund her bed and board. Unable to secure the required practice teaching hours to complete her degree because no-one would provide a person with Japanese parentage work experience, she left Wisconsin without a degree. (Wisconsin awarded the degree to her in 1998). Asawa recounted an experience in Missouri when she and her sister didn't know which bathroom to use and chose to use the colored toilet.

In 1945, the summer before her final year in Milwaukee, Asawa decided to travel to Mexico with her older sister Lois Misako (Asawa) Shishido instead of going to Black Mountain. There, Asawa studied art at two Mexican schools. First, she and Lois attended the Universidad Nacional Autonoma de Mexico. Lois studied the Spanish language, and Asawa studied both the Spanish language and Mexican art. Among her teachers was Clara Porset, an interior designer from Cuba and friend of artist Josef Albers. Porset told Asawa about Black Mountain College, where he was teaching. Asawa also took a class in sculpture and painting at "La Esmeralda" or Escuela Nacional de Pintura, Escultura y Grabado. It was through a teacher that she was able to see Orozco's mural and learn how to apply fresh plaster to a mural in progress by American artist George Biddle called War and Peace at the Supreme Court of Mexico. Ruth Asawa, who would eventually return to Mexico in 1947 to learn the knitted wire technique that she used to make her famous sculptures, was drawn to Mexico for its colors, ceramics, decorative arts, and painting.

Originally Asawa wanted to be an art teacher but Asawa has since recounted:

I was told that it might be difficult for me, with the memories of the war still fresh, to work in a public school. My life might even be in danger. This was a godsend, because it encouraged me to follow my interest in art, and I subsequently enrolled at Black Mountain College in North Carolina.

From 1946 to 1949, she studied at Black Mountain College with Josef Albers after being recruited by artist Ray Johnson. Under Albers's mentorship, Asawa learned to use commonplace materials and began experimenting with wire. Like other Black Mountain College students, Asawa took courses on different art forms, which shaped her artistic practice. Under Ilya Bolotowsky and Josef Albers's mentorship, her drawings explore patterns and repetition, bird and chevron motifs, overlapping forms, and optical illusions. She was especially intrigued by the meander as a motif. Asawa found the summer sessions, called the Summer Institute, of 1946 and 1948, which featured courses by Jacob Lawrence, Beaumont Newhall, Jean Varda, John Cage, Merce Cunningham, Willem de Kooning, Leo Amino, and R. Buckminster Fuller particularly influential. According to Asawa, the dance courses she took with Merce Cunningham were especially inspirational. In one class, Asawa recalls running down a large hill with flaming torches to Stravinsky's The Rite of Spring. In contrast, Asawa described her experiences studying under Josef Albers as more formalist, which she connected with due to her cultural background and what she described as an intolerance for emotion. Asawa retook the same design, color, and drawing and painting courses with Albers for multiple years and found that ruminating on the same problems led to deeper feelings towards the work. Her experience at Black Mountain and the adversity her family faced led to the social consciousness seen in her sculptures.

== Career ==
In 1947, while a student at Black Mountain College, Asawa made a series of abstract looped-wire sculptures using a wire-looping technique she learned from craftspeople in Toluca, Mexico, where she visited Josef Albers on sabbatical. Asawa was initially inspired by the market baskets with eggs and other produce she saw. She explained:

I was interested in it because of the economy of a line, making something in space, enclosing it without blocking it out. It's still transparent. I realized that if I was going to make these forms, which interlock and interweave, it can only be done with a line because a line can go anywhere.

Asawa began with basket designs and later explored bimorphic forms that hang from the ceiling. She felt that she and her classmates were ahead of the Black Mountain College administration in developing their own form of modernism in sculpture. Still, Asawa appreciated Black Mountain College for its equality and for giving students the freedom to explore.

Following her trip to Mexico, Asawa's drawing teacher, Ilya Bolotowsky, noted her new fascination with using wire as a way of drawing in space. Asawa described her looped-wire sculptures as shapes that are simultaneously inside and outside, embodying interior and exterior, line and volume, and past and future material states. She believed it was important to have a relationship with the past and present and not to be just modern or just old.

Experimentation was key to finding her visual identity as an artist. While her technique resembles weaving, Asawa did not study weaving nor use fiber materials. In college, she embraced inexpensive found objects such as rocks, leaves, and sticks.

Untitled (S.449, Hanging Three Lobed Form with Stripes and Two Interior Spheres) (c. 1958) at the Metropolitan Museum of Art in 2022

Asawa's unconventional hanging wire sculptures were not immediately accepted until her work was featured on the covers of Arts & Architecture in 1952 and Vogue in 1953. She continued to rise in prominence in the 1950s, when her work appeared several times in the Whitney Biennial, in a 1954 exhibition at the San Francisco Museum of Modern Art, and in the 1955 São Paulo Art Biennial.

In 1962, Asawa began experimenting with tied wire sculptures of branching forms rooted in nature. Over time, these forms became increasingly geometric and abstract. At times, she treated the wire by galvanizing it. She also experimented with electroplating or running the electric current in the "wrong" direction to create textural effects. On Asawa's impact, Daniell Cornell, curator of the de Young Museum in San Francisco, said:

Ruth was ahead of her time in understanding how sculptures could function to define and interpret space... This aspect of her work anticipates much of the installation work that has come to dominate contemporary art.

In 1965, Asawa participated in the Tamarind Lithography Workshop Fellowship in Los Angeles. Collaborating with the seven printmakers at the workshop, she produced fifty-two lithographs of friends, family (including her parents, Umakichi and Haru), natural objects, and plants. In the 1960s, Asawa began receiving commissions for large-scale sculptures in public and commercial spaces in San Francisco and other cities. Her first public sculpture, Andrea (1968) in Ghirardelli Square, was installed at night to create the impression that it had always been there. Andrea depicts two cast bronze mermaids in a fountain: one nurses a merbaby, and the other holds a lily pad. Lily pads, sea turtles, and frogs surround them. The sculpture plays recordings of frogs croaking. Upon installation, the sculpture generated much controversy over aesthetics, feminism, and public art. Lawrence Halprin, the landscape architect who was originally chosen to design the waterfront space, described the sculpture as a suburban lawn ornament and demanded its removal. Asawa countered:

For the old, it would bring back the fantasy of their childhood, and for the young, it would give them something to remember when they grow old.

Many San Franciscans, especially women, rallied behind Asawa to protect the sculpture.

For her San Francisco Fountain on Stockton Street, Asawa mobilized 200 schoolchildren to mold hundreds of images of San Francisco in dough. These images were then cast in iron. Over the years, she designed more public fountains and became known as the "fountain lady" in San Francisco.

In 2019, her Untitled (S.387, Hanging Three Separate Layers of Three-Lobed Forms), circa 1955, sold for $4.1 million. In 2020, her Untitled (S.401, Hanging Seven-Lobed, Continuous Interlocking Form, with Spheres within Two Lobes), circa 1953–1954, sold for $5.4 million.

Ruth Asawa Through Line, the first exhibition to focus on her drawing practice, opened at the Whitney Museum of American Art in 2023 and traveled to the Menil Collection in Houston in 2024. Co-organized by both institutions in close collaboration with the artist's estate, the show highlighted the breadth of Asawa's paper work, including drawings, collages, watercolors, and daily sketches, as drawing is a continuous strand throughout her career. While Asawa is widely celebrated for her three-dimensional work, working in wire was an outgrowth of her interest in drawing.

Ruth Asawa: A Retrospective at SFMOMA was organized by the San Francisco Museum of Modern Art (SFMOMA) in collaboration with The Museum of Modern Art (MoMA). The exhibition will run at SFMOMA from April 5 to September 2, 2025, at MoMA from October 19, 2025, to February 7, 2026, at the Guggenheim Museum Bilbao in Spain from March 20 to September 13, 2026, and at the Fondation Beyeler in Riehen, Switzerland from October 18, 2026, to January 24, 2027. An exhibition catalog of the same name was edited and published by Janet Bishop and Cara Manes in 2025.

== Public service and arts education activism ==
Asawa was an ardent advocate for art education as a transformative and empowering experience for all people, especially children. In 1968, she was appointed a member of the San Francisco Arts Commission and began lobbying politicians and foundations to support art programs for young children and other San Franciscans. In 1968, Asawa co-founded the Alvarado Arts Workshop for school children. Using federal funding from the Comprehensive Employment and Training Act (CETA) in the 1970s, the Alvardo Arts Workshop became a model for the Art Commissions' CETA/Neighborhood, a nationally replicated program that employs artists of all disciplines to do public service work.

The Alvarado approach integrated the arts and gardening, which mirrored Asawa's upbringing on a farm. Asawa believed that children could benefit from learning from professional artists as she did at Black Mountain College. Because of this, eighty-five percent of the program's budget went toward hiring professional artists. In 2010, the San Francisco School of the Arts was renamed the Ruth Asawa San Francisco School of the Arts in her honor. Asawa served on the California Arts Council, the National Endowment for the Arts in 1976, and as a trustee of the Fine Arts Museums of San Francisco from 1989 to 1997. As a member of President Jimmy Carter's Commission on Mental Health, Asawa advised on the importance of art. At the end of her life, Asawa said art education was central to her life's work.

== Personal life ==
In July 1949, Asawa married architect Albert Lanier, whom she met in 1947 at Black Mountain College. At the time of their marriage, interracial marriages were illegal in all but two states, California and Washington. The couple had six children: Xavier (born 1950), Aiko (born 1950), Hudson (born 1952), Adam (1956–2003), Addie (born 1958), and Paul (born 1959). Albert Lanier died in 2008. In 1960, the family moved to San Francisco's Noe Valley neighborhood, where she was an active member of the community for many years. Asawa believed it was better to make a place good than to be a little bit here and a little bit there.

Asawa often created art at home with her kids, reflecting her belief that life intertwines with art. It was important to Asawa that her family had dinner together. She and Albert shared that they always invited their children to their events, and if the events didn't allow children, then they wouldn't go. When interviewed about her family life, Asawa shared that it was important to her to teach her children hard work, because that is what her parents taught her.

== Death ==
Asawa died of natural causes on August 5, 2013, at her San Francisco home at the age of 87.

== Legacy ==
Featuring some 300 artworks at MoMA in winter 2026, the huge, multi-room "Ruth Asawa: A Retrospective" exhibit is the first posthumous survey of Asawa's six-decade-long career, displaying her "lifelong explorations of materials and forms in a variety of mediums, including wire sculpture, bronze casts, drawings, paintings, prints, and public works." The exhibit is the largest one MoMA has ever devoted to a woman. On January 26, 2026 the museum was also scheduled to host a special event celebrating Asawa's 100th birthday.

In May 2026, Ruth Asawa Lanier, Inc., which is run by her family, is opening an ongoing gallery space at Minnesota Street Project in San Francisco. After opening with an inaugural exhibit of art by Asawa, future exhibits are planned to include work by her contemporaries including Imogen Cunningham, Ray Johnson and Josef and Anni Albers, as well as annual exhibits of art by Ruth Asawa San Francisco School of the Arts students and faculty.

== Awards and honors ==
- In 2010, School of the Arts High School in San Francisco was renamed Ruth Asawa San Francisco School of the Arts in honor of Asawa.
- In 2020, the United States Postal Service issued a set of postage stamps to honor Ruth Asawa.
- A Google Doodle for May 1, 2019, the first day of Asian Pacific American Heritage Month, was made to celebrate Ruth Asawa.
- Because of her crocheted wire sculptures and advocacy efforts in the arts, the Crochet Guild of America recognized Asawa as an inspiring pioneer in the crochet community.
- In 2023, she was posthumously awarded a National Medal of Arts.

== Collections ==
- Guggenheim Museum, New York, NY
- Museum of Modern Art, New York, NY
- National Gallery of Art, Washington, DC

== Selected works ==
Sculptural art
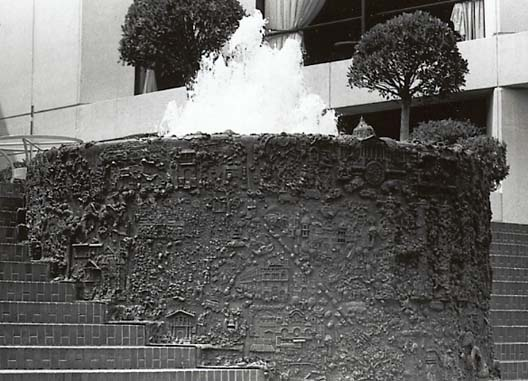
Ruth Asawa's San Francisco Fountain at the Grand Hyatt San Francisco

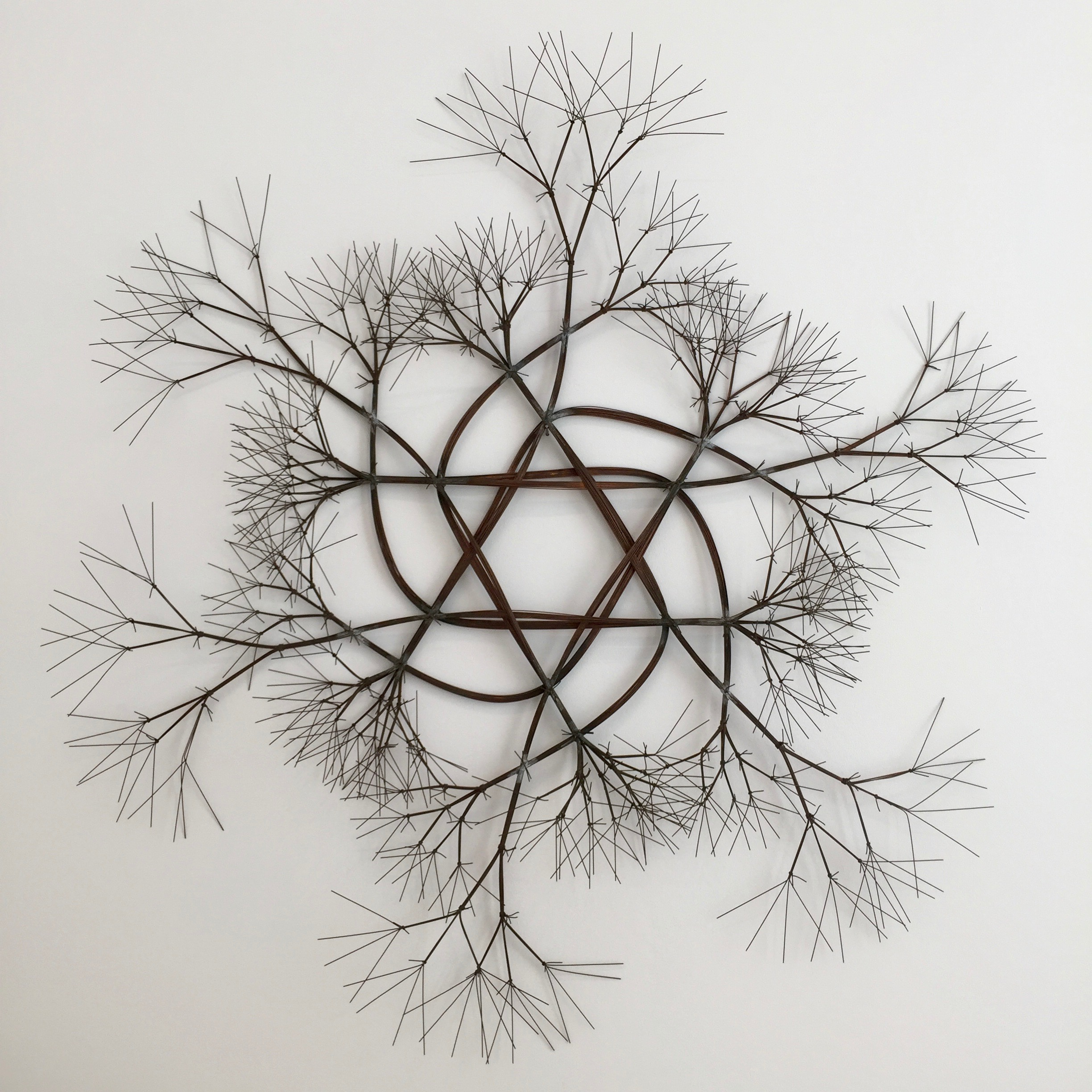
Untitled (S.383, Wall-Mounted Tied Wire, Open-Center, Six-Pointed Star, with Six Branches), c. 1967.

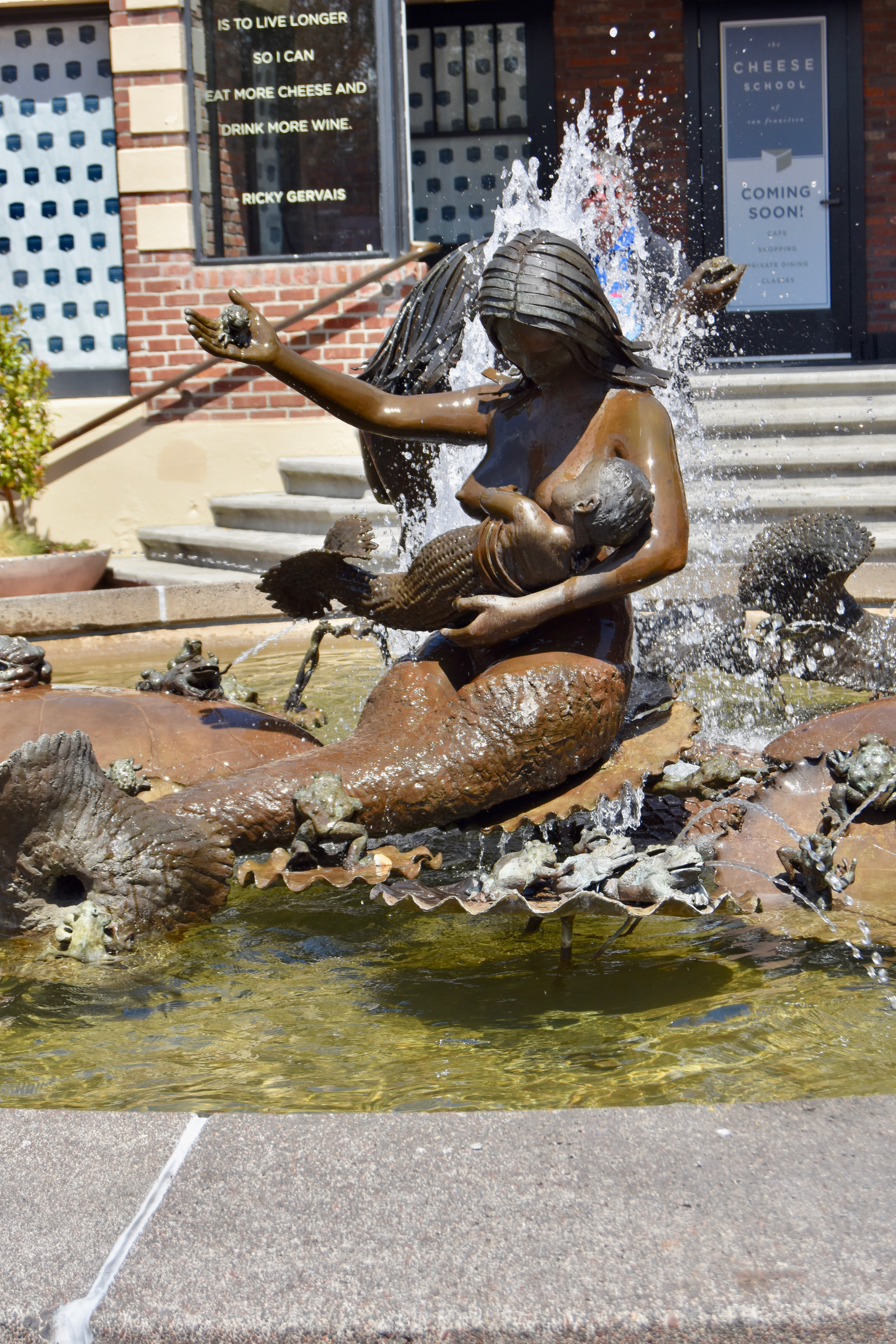
Andrea, the mermaid fountain at Ghirardelli Square (1966)
- Andrea (1966), the mermaid fountain at Ghirardelli Square, San Francisco
- San Francisco Fountain (1973), The Hyatt on Union Square, San Francisco
- Origami Fountains (1976), The Buchanan Mall (Nihonmachi), San Francisco
- Aurora (1986), the origami-inspired fountain on the San Francisco waterfront.
- Japanese American Internment Memorial (1994), San Jose
- Garden of Remembrance (2002), San Francisco State University

== Awards ==
- 1966: First Dymaxion Award for Artist/Scientist
- 1974: Gold Medal from the American Institute of Architects
- 1990: San Francisco Chamber of Commerce Cyril Magnin Award
- 1993: Honor Award from the Women's Caucus for the Arts
- 1995: Asian American Art Foundations Golden Ring Lifetime Achievement Award
- 2002: Honorary doctorate by San Francisco State University
- Since 1982, San Francisco has declared February 12 to be "Ruth Asawa Day"
- 2024: A crater on the planet Mercury was named in her honor in November

== Film ==
- Snyder, Robert, producer (1978) Ruth Asawa: On Forms and Growth, Pacific Palisades, CA: Masters and Masterworks Production
- Soe, Valerie, and Ruth Asawa directors (2003) Each One Teach One: The Alvarado School Art Program, San Francisco: Alvarado Arts Program.

== See also ==
- History of the Japanese in San Francisco
- List of Japanese Americans
