= Amin =

Amin may refer to:

== People ==
- Amin (name), a masculine given name and also a surname
- Al-Amin, sixth Abbasid caliph, who ruled from 809 to 813
- Amin (Qing dynasty), Imperial Prince of the Qing Dynasty
- Idi Amin (1928–2003), military ruler of Uganda from 1971 to 1979

== Other uses ==
- Amin, Kurukshetra, now known as Abhimanyupur, a village in Haryana state, India
- AMIN, or Anak Mindanao, a political party in the Philippines
- "Amin" (song), a song by Anna Vissi
- AMIN Worldwide, an alliance of independently owned advertising agencies
- Amin (film), a 2018 French drama film
- Amen in religion
- Amin, an arbitrator who assessed and collected revenue in the Parganas
- AMIN, a campaign slogan of the Anies Baswedan 2024 presidential campaign in Indonesia

== See also ==
- Amine (disambiguation)
- Amen (disambiguation)
- Amina (disambiguation)
- Aming (J-pop), a Japanese singing duo popular in the early 1980s, known for their song "Matsuwa"
- "Amin, Amin, ya Rabaljalil", the anthem for Perlis, a state in Malaysia
