= Ruth Asawa San Francisco School of the Arts =

Public arts high school in San Francisco, California

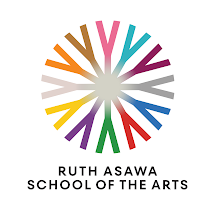

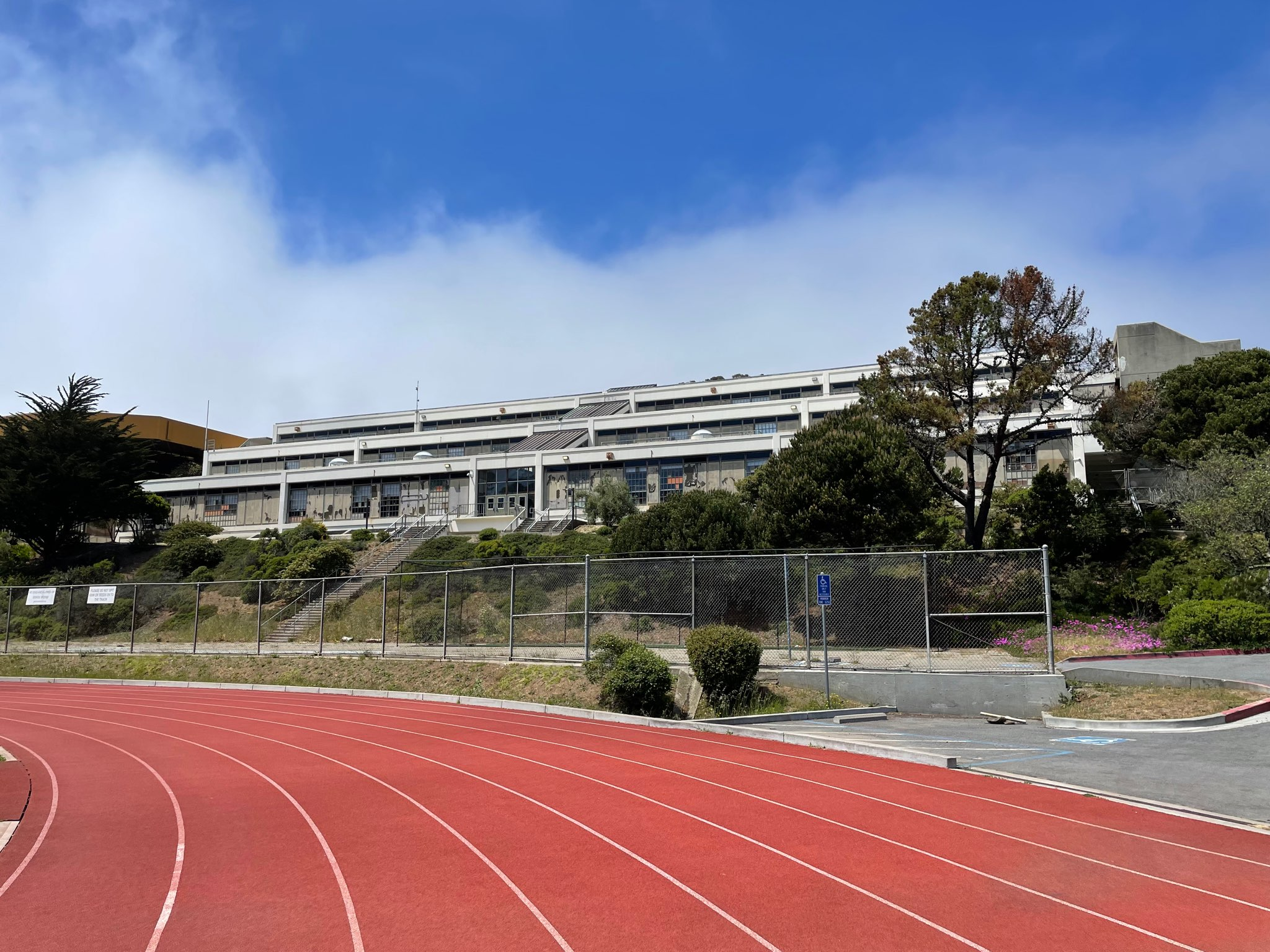

Location
- 555 Portola Drive; San Francisco, California 94131; United States; 37.7454°N 122.4486°W

Information
- Type: Public Arts High School
- Established: 1982
- School district: San Francisco Unified School District
- NCES School ID: 063441001276
- Principal: Stella Kim
- Teaching staff: 35.58 (on an FTE basis)
- Grades: 9–12
- Gender: 230 Male, 447 Female (2023-24)
- Enrollment: 679 (2022-23)
- Student to teacher ratio: 18.84
- Mascot: Dragon
- Newspaper: RASOTA Daily Dragon
- Website: asawa.sfusd.edu

The Ruth Asawa San Francisco School of the Arts, colloquially referred to as SOTA, is a public alternative high school in San Francisco, California, United States. It was established in 1982 and is part of the San Francisco Unified School District. It is currently located at 555 Portola Drive, San Francisco CA 94131.

== History ==
Former logo of the school.

Reid & Tarics designed, from 1967, Diamond Heights High School, Thomas J. Mellon, Chief Administrative Officer of San Francisco, suggested it be renamed for Martin Luther King, it was renamed for California State Senator J. Eugene McAteer (February 28, 1916 – May 26, 1967), in April 1972, which operated from 1973 to 2002. It is also the site of Academy of Arts & Sciences (San Francisco)

For many years, Ruth Asawa, sculptor and advocate for arts in education, as well as others, had campaigned to start a public high school in San Francisco devoted to the arts, with the ultimate goal of such a school to be located in the arts corridor in the heart of San Francisco's Civic Center. Ruth Asawa was known for her dedication in bringing art education to her community through teaching, and creating art programs that still exist today. Her art contributions can be seen as sculptures throughout the city of San Francisco, and in the programs she has created for art education. The school she created, School of the Arts (SOTA), was later renamed to Ruth Asawa School of the Arts in her name.

At its inception in 1982, School of the Arts was created as a part of J. Eugene McAteer High School, on its present site on Portola Drive. Ten years later, in 1992, the school - now a full-fledged public school separate from McAteer - was relocated to the former SFUSD Frederick Burke Elementary School at 700 Font Boulevard on the campus of San Francisco State University. Due to the dissolution of McAteer High School in 2002, SOTA was offered to return to the more appropriate, fully equipped high school site.

In 2010, School of the Arts was renamed the Ruth Asawa San Francisco School of the Arts in honor of Ruth Asawa. In 2011, the school was recognized as a "California Distinguished School" by the California Department of Education as one of the state's most "exemplary and inspiring" public schools, demonstrating significant gains in narrowing the achievement gap among its students.

In 2005, a new public high school, the Academy of Arts and Sciences was established on the same campus. Although it shared the McAteer campus with SOTA, it was a completely separate school that admitted students through the normal high school admissions process. In 2025, it was determined that the school would be relocated to Wallenberg High School beginning the 2026-27 school year for further academic growth in its program.

== Arts and academics ==
In addition to a standard curriculum block schedule, students attend daily art classes specific to their particular discipline. There are eight art departments with ten strands. The departments are:

- Architecture and Design
- Dance — Conservatory Dance or World Dance
- Media and Film
- Music — Classical Instrumental, Contemporary Instrumental, Vocal, or World Music
- Theater — Acting and Musical Theater
- Technical Theater — Stagecraft
- Costume and Fashion Design
- Visual Arts
- Writing — Creative Writing or Spoken Arts

Each discipline has a Head Director, responsible for managing their arts department. Each year, department heads invite new or returning “Artists-in-Residence” to offer their knowledge to a class. Some departments organize for students to perform at or be featured in museums.

== Demographics ==
36.8% White, 21.8% Hispanic or Latino, 15.4% two or more races, 13.8% Asian, 4.4% African American, 3.8% Filipino, 0.3% Native American, 0.1% Pacific Islander, and 4.1% not reported. (2023–24)

== Admissions process ==
Acceptance into the school is based on an audition process for the approximately 200 spots available for incoming Freshmen. Applicants are required to submit an online application, an audition assignment, and attend an in-person audition. All students who complete the audition assignment are offered an opportunity to audition in person for admission to SOTA the following year. Admission is based on audition results; no academic criteria are used.

== McAteer Cafe and Community Farm ==
The McAteer Cafe provides free meals to SOTA and Academy students. It is the first kitchen in the district to employ a chef, Josh Davidson, and his team of one cook and four assistant cooks. Ran by the SFUSD Student Nutrition Services, it is the only school in the district the prepares everything from scratch.

The McAteer Campus Community Farm was established in 2009, and has experienced many different changes since. The farm sold eggs, honey, and produce sourced from the chickens, bees, and crops grown on the campus until the nonprofit organization managing the farm disbanded due to the pandemic. In 2024, a grant of $100,000 from the USDA's Farm to School program helped members of the community partner with Urban Sprouts, employ a farm manager, and fund several restoration and expansion projects.

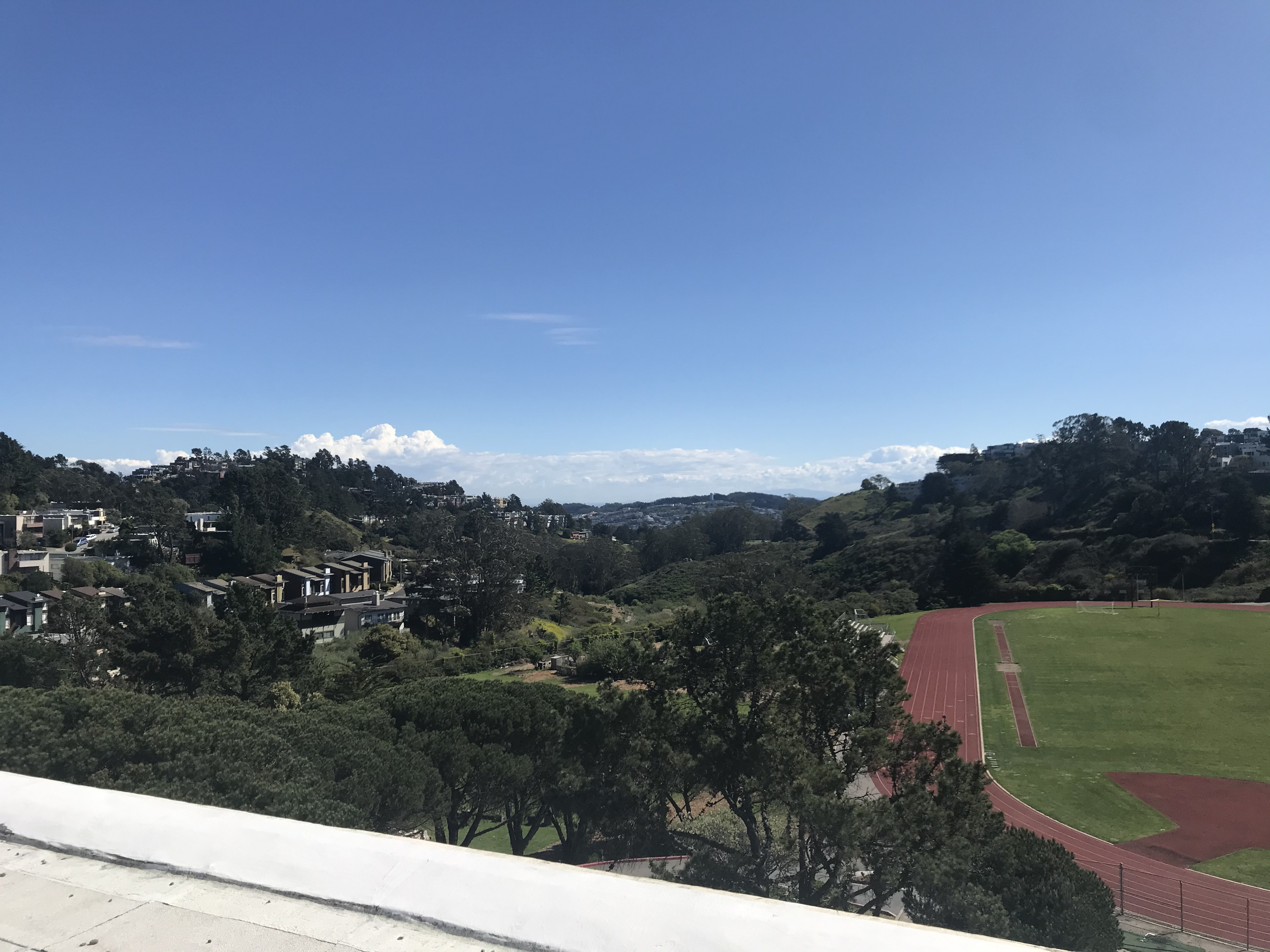
SOTA's track, field, and garden

== Alumni ==
- Aya Cash, actress
- Margaret Cho, comedian, actress, fashion designer, author, and singer-songwriter
- Natalie Cressman, musician
- Lena Hall, actress, singer and songwriter
- Peregrine Honig, artist, filmmaker
- Crystal Lee, beauty pageant title holder
- MK Nobilette, singer
- Sam Rockwell, actor
- Salvador Santana, instrumentalist
- Joe Talbot, filmmaker
- Jesse Thorn, radio show host
- Miranda Lee Richards, singer-songwriter
- Aisha Tyler, actress, comedian, director and talk show host
