= Aurora (Asawa) =

Fountain and sculpture by Ruth Asawa in San Francisco, California, U.S.

- Aurora Fountain
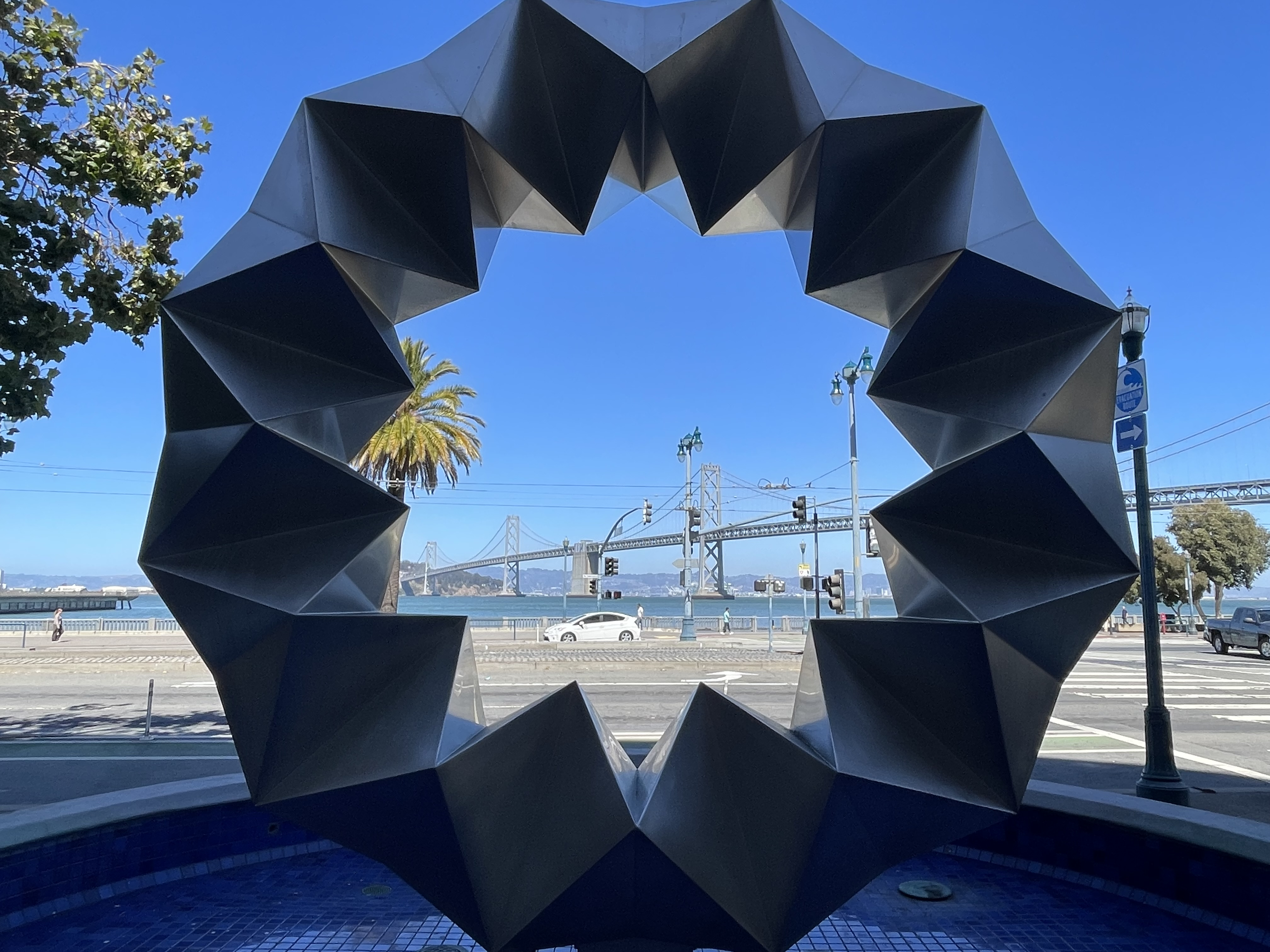
- Artist: Ruth Asawa
- Completion date: 1986
- Type: Sculpture
- Medium: Stainless steel
- Location: San Francisco; 37°47′33″N 122°23′29″W
- Website: ruthasawa.com/aurora-the-embarcadero-1984-1986/

Aurora (Note: At times colloquially and incorrectly referred to as the Aurora Fountain.) is an outdoor stainless steel fountain and sculpture completed in 1986 by Ruth Asawa, installed at Bayside Plaza (188 Embarcadero) at Howard Street in San Francisco, California, United States.

== See also ==
- Andrea
- 1986 in art
