= Grand Hyatt San Francisco =

Hotel in San Francisco, California

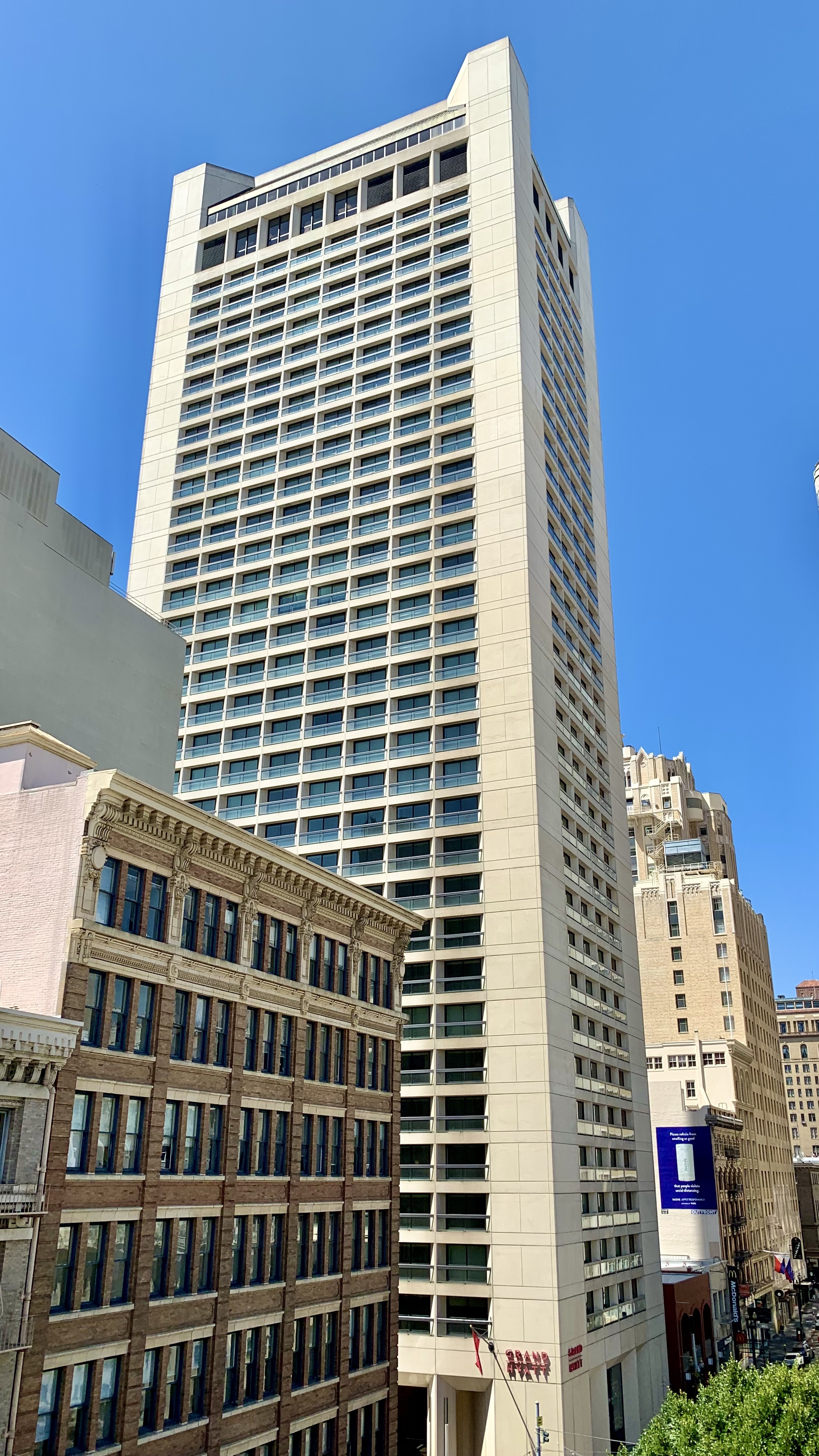
- In May 2021

- Location within San Francisco Grand Hyatt SF (California) Grand Hyatt SF (the United States)
- Hotel chain: Hyatt Hotels Corporation

General information
- Location: United States, 345 Stockton Street; San Francisco, California
- Coordinates: 37.78911°N 122.40723°W
- Opening: 1972
- Owner: Host Hotels & Resorts
- Management: Hyatt Hotels Corporation

Height
- Height: 108 m (354 ft)

Technical details
- Floor count: 42(one as Mezzanine, 4 basements, loading dock)

Design and construction
- Architect: Skidmore, Owings & Merrill

Other information
- Number of rooms: 668
- Number of suites: 29
- Number of restaurants: OneUp Restaurant(Mezzanine level)

Website
- https://sanfrancisco.grand.hyatt.com/

The Grand Hyatt San Francisco is a skyscraper hotel located half a block north of Union Square in San Francisco, California. The 36-storey, 660 room 108 m (354 ft) tower was completed in 1972, as the Hyatt on Union Square and renamed the Grand Hyatt San Francisco in 1990.

The hotel had 402 employees before the COVID-19 pandemic, dropping to 28 as of April 2021, mainly due to cancelled conventions in the city. It was closed for around half of 2020, losing about $1 million per day during that time.

== Ruth Asawa's San Francisco Fountain ==
A fountain by Ruth Asawa is located outside the Grand Hyatt. The basin is made of bronze and has a bas-relief with scenes of San Francisco.

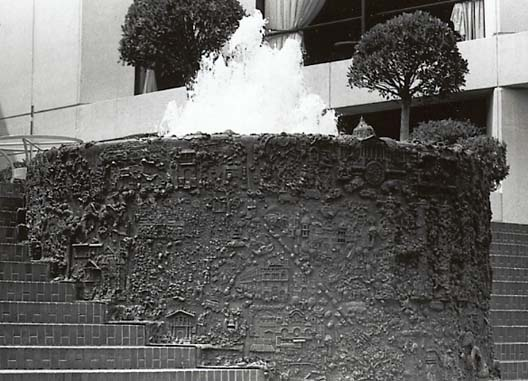
Ruth Asawa's San Francisco Fountain

== 2024 strike ==
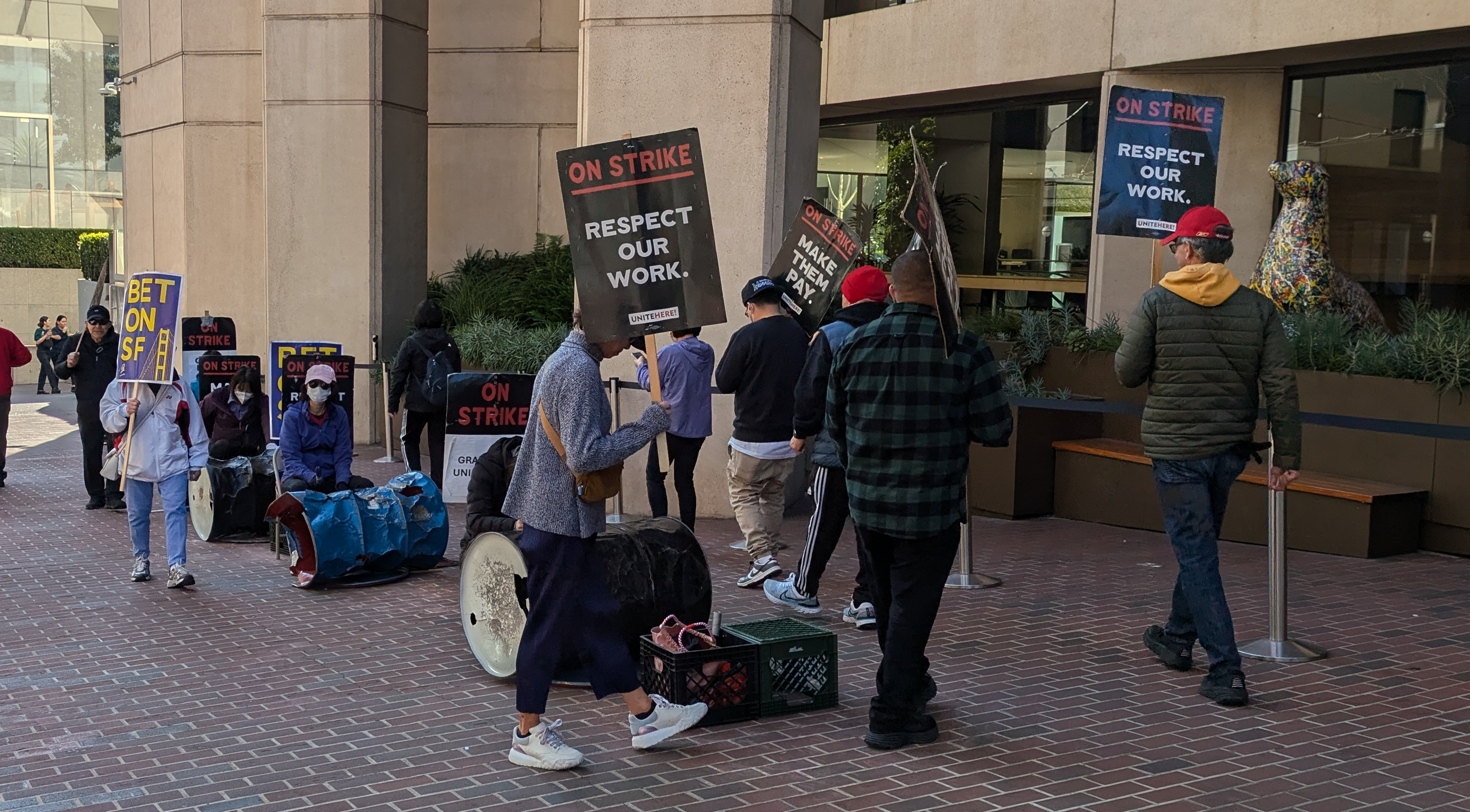
The strike on November 8, 2024

In September 2024, workers at the Grand Hyatt went on strike. The strike was organized by labor union Unite Here Local 2. As of December 2, 2024, the strike remained ongoing, and was also expected to last past the upcoming holidays. On December 24, 2024, a four-year labor agreement was ratified, thus bringing the strike to an end.

== See also ==
- San Francisco's tallest buildings
