= Amina – Chechen Republic Online =

Chechen web portal

Amina - Chechen Republic Online
- Type: Defunct
- Industry: Social networking service
- Founded: Berkeley, California (March 13, 1997)
- Founder: Albert Digaev
- Headquarters: Palo Alto, California
- Key people: Albert Digaev, Webmaster

Amina – Chechen Republic Online, popularly known as Amina.com, was a social network service and website that included information on the Chechen language and culture and photos of the First and Second Chechen Wars.

== Overview ==
It was founded on March 13, 1997, by Albert Digaev, a Chechen refugee living in the United States, as a means of communication for the disparate global Chechen diaspora community. It was the first website focused on Chechnya and was named after a popular Chechen girl's name. It provided information, links and images about and from Chechnya, the history of Chechnya, people, culture and the conflict as well as Internet forums, chat rooms, photo sharings, and email.

The website was once closely monitored by the pro-Russian Chechen government. The site was also denounced as an “ideological diversion against Chechen society”.

== Features ==
The site, which allowed users to write in Chechen, Russian, and English, was free to users and generates revenue from advertising including web banners. Features of the website included Chechen Forum, Articles related to Chechnya, Chechen Photo Gallery, Chechen Chat, and Chechen Mail.

Chechen Forum

As of May 17, 2007, the Chechen Forum hosted more than 3,500 members and more than 300,000 posts. Although all forum visitors may browse among the various threads, only visitors who have created a free subscription account may be able to make forum posts, receive email notifications of replies to posts, and send and receive private messages. In late April 2007, Albert Digaev added English language registration to the Chechen Forum, to allow English speakers access and an English language thread to allow English speakers to communicate with Chechens.

Articles related to Chechnya

The articles section included essays on the Chechen conflict, resources on the Chechen language, and appeals to end the war in Chechnya. Some of the articles' authors include famed Russian journalist Andrei Babitsky, Chechen Ambassador to the United States Lyoma Usmanov, and U.S. Under Secretary for Political Affairs R. Nicholas Burns. The list of articles has not been updated since February 2005.

Chechen Photo Gallery

Chechen Photo Gallery logo.

The Chechen Photo Gallery enabled users with a free subscription account to upload photos of themselves and their friends, as well as rate or comment on others' photos. Although individuals are primarily Chechens, Russians and Caucasians are well represented in the gallery as well. Sections of the gallery include Individuals, Girls, Boys, Chechen Television, Our Neighbors, People of the Arts, Children, Historical Photos, My Chechnya, and New Photos.

Chechen Chat

Chechen Chat was a free IRC service powered by the ASP.NET web application framework. Users can private message directly with other Amina.com users. This feature was reinstated in 2007 after going offline for several months.

Chechen Mail

Chechen Mail logo

Chechen Mail was a Gmail-powered service which enables users to gain access to a private email account with an amina.com domain name. When Google Apps enabled Gmail users to check their email accounts using the BlackBerry Wireless handheld device, Chechen Mail users by extension gained access to this new feature. Email signup required permission from the Amina – Chechen Republic Online network administrator.
