= Amen (website) =

Social networking service

Amen.
- Company type: Private
- Website type: Social networking service
- Founded: Berlin, Germany
- Headquarters: Berlin, Germany
- Area served: Worldwide
- Founders: Felix Petersen; Caitlin Winner; Florian Weber
- Key people: Felix Peterson (co-founder & CEO); Caitlin Winner (co-founder & CPO); Florian Weber (co-founder & CTO)
- Employees: 8
- Website: getamen.com
- Registration: Required to post
- Launched: September 2011
- Current status: Discontinued

Amen was a social networking service.

== About ==
Noted for its addictive, mad lib-like feel and ability to create structured data, Amen has received attention, having been selected as one of Venturebeat's top 5 favorites from TechCrunch Disrupt 2011.

"You fire up the app on the iPhone or web browser and say a person, place or thing is “the best” or “the worst” ever, like like, the Best Dubstep track ever...You can agree with this statement with an “Amen”. But with a “Hell no” you have to suggest an alternative answer. It's a rigid structure, but you can post whatever you want." .

== History ==
Amen was started in February 2011 by Felix Petersen, Florian Weber and Caitlin Winner. Seed round investors include Index and A Grade. In August 2013, Amen was bought by tape.tv. In February 2015 tape.tv announced the shut down of the platform.

== See also ==
- State
