= Jeanne Amen =

French painter (1863–1923)

Jean Amen
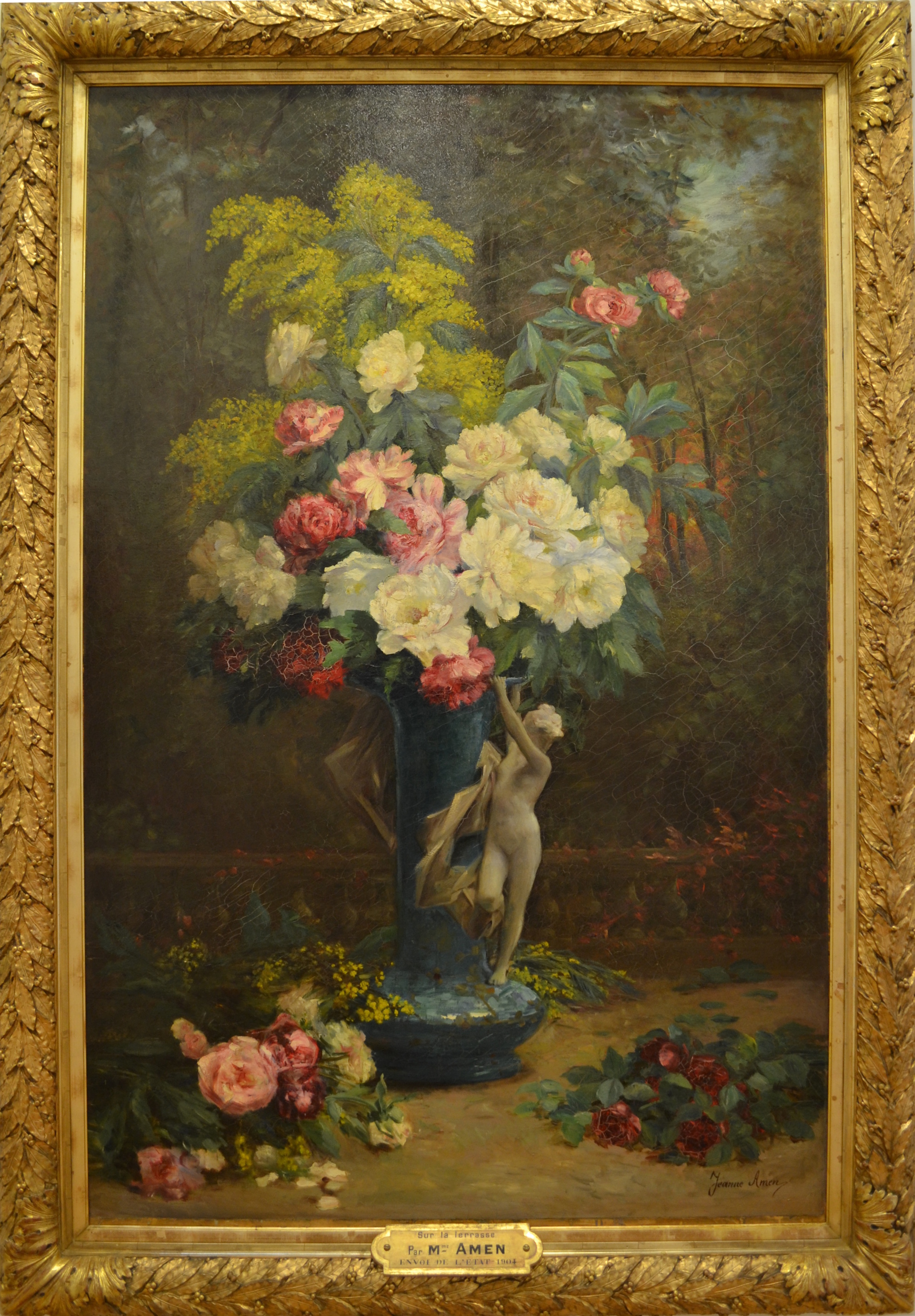
- Sur la terrasse, 1892.
- Born: Jeanne-Marie-Joséphine Moreau; 1863; Belleville-sur-Saône
- Died: April 9, 1923; Paris

Jeanne Amen (1863 – April 9, 1923) was a French painter.

== Biography ==
She was born Jeanne-Marie-Joséphine Moreau in Belleville-sur-Saône. She was a student of Antoine Grivolas of Avignon.

Amen was an inspector in the drawing schools of Paris, and the director of the journal Art et la Femme. Around 1896 she published a 150-page book of her views on art, titled l'art au point de vue feminin.

She was buried in cimetière des Batignolles April 11, 1923.

== Collections ==
- musée des beaux-arts, Lyon, Allée fleurie ou Églantiers en fleurs
- Musée des Ursulines, Mâcon, Les lys et la mer, Salon of 1900
- Musée des beaux-arts de Rouen, Rouen, Fleurs
- Centre national des arts plastiques, Paris
- Musée Paul-Dini, Villefranche-sur-Saône, Sur la terrasse, 1892. Huile sur toile
