= Amine (disambiguation) =

An amine is an organic compound.

Amine may also refer to:

- Amine (name), alternate spelling of Amin
- Amine (singer), a French-Moroccan R&B singer
- Aminé (born 1994), American rapper

== See also ==
- Amin (disambiguation)
- Amino (disambiguation)
- Anime, Japanese animation
- Metal ammine complex
