= Amina (magazine) =

French-language women's magazine

- September 2012 issue of Amina
- Categories: Women's magazine
- Frequency: Monthly
- Founded: 1972; 53 years ago
- Country: France
- Based in: Paris
- Language: French
- Website: www.amina-mag.com

Amina is a monthly French-language woman's magazine aimed black women in Africa, Europe, the Antilles and North America. It was founded in 1972 and is headquartered in Paris.

== History ==
In 1970, Michel de Breteuil followed the example of the South African magazine Drum and founded several women's magazine in different African countries, before uniting all of them into one magazine named Amina in April 1972. Senegalese Simon Kiba was the cofounder of the magazine. For the first three years, its headquarters were in Senegal, before they were moved to Paris in 1975. Initially aimed at black women in Africa, it expanded its readership to Black women in the Antilles, Europe and North America over the years. The first edition contained a thirty-two page fotonovela in black and white, with only the first and the back page being in color. Reportages about social issues and fashion have been added gradually since. Amina has got the highest circulation of French-language magazines for black women with several ten-thousand copies per month.
