= Ameen Khosravian =

Iranian-American basketball player

Personal information
- Born: February 6, 1989 (age 37) Los Angeles, California
- Listed height: 5 ft 11 in (1.80 m)
- Listed weight: 160 lb (73 kg)

Career information
- High school: Oakland Mills (Columbia, Maryland)
- College: None
- NBA draft: 2012: undrafted
- Playing career: 2013–present
- Position: Point guard / shooting guard

Career history
- 2013: Team Kiev (ESL)
- 2014: Zob Ahan Isfahan BC*
- 2014–2015: Columbia All Stars (EBA)
- 2015: Mahram Tehran BC*
- 2015–2016: Baltimore Hawks (ABA)
- 2016: Team Rome (ESL)
- 2017: Azad University Tehran BC*
- 2018: Rio de Janeiro (ESL)
- 2019: Petrochimi Bandar Imam BC*
- 2019: Iranian National Team (Camp)
- 2020: Armenia (Euro-tour)

Ameen Khosravian (Persian: امین خسرویان born 6 February 1989) is an Iranian American professional basketball player and founder of Pirouzi Athletics.

Ameen is the first Middle Eastern to play professional basketball on any level in the U.S., and abroad without AAU, Private School, and Collegiate experience. He is also the first American-born Iranian in the ABA, the first Iranian in Baltimore basketball history, and the first American-born Iranian in Iranian-Super League history.

Additionally, Ameen is his extended family's first basketball player and professional athlete. His parents immigrated to the U.S. shortly after the Iranian Revolution during the early stages of the Iran-Iraq war. His father, Ali, was in the military, and his mother, Simin, was a housewife. A majority of his family lives in Iran.

He was born in Los Angeles, California, and raised in Maryland. He founded Pirouzi Athletics in 2019 in Baltimore, MD.
