= Amino (app) =

Online social networking service (2012–2025)

- Final logo used from 2023 to 2025 and interchangeably with the 2019 logo
- Developer: MediaLab
- Release: January 2012; 14 years ago
- Final release: 3.5.35167 / May 21, 2024
- Operating system: Android, iOS, Web
- Size: 21.02 MB
- Available in: 7 languages
- List of languages English, Spanish, Portuguese, Arabic, French, German, Russian
- Website: aminoapps.com

Amino was a social media application originally developed by Narvii, Inc. It was originally created by Yin Wang and Ben Anderson in 2010, and then launched as an app in 2012. Amino was acquired by MediaLab AI Inc in January 2021, and the founders are no longer associated with the application. The platform ceased all operations on December 19, 2025.

== History ==
In 2010, Wang and Anderson came up with the idea for a convention-like community while attending an anime convention in Boston, Massachusetts. Later that year, they would release two apps revolving around K-pop and photography that allowed fans of those subjects to chat freely. That same year, Amino was officially released.

=== Shutdown ===
In early December 2025, the Amino platform abruptly stopped all operations. Users worldwide lost access to the mobile application and website, with server requests returning connection time-out errors. Parent company MediaLab AI has issued no official statement regarding the cause to date, or declared any possible cause behind it.

According to Shawn, a member of Amino support, Amino has ceased operations as of December 19, 2025. On January 4, 2026, Shawn released a message which reads:

Hey there,

Thanks for your message. Amino has ceased operations. As of December 19th, we no longer retain personal data relating to you. Accordingly, we are unable to provide a copy of your data.

Kind regards,

— Amino Support

As of 2026, the Amino app is no longer available on the Apple App Store or on the Google Play Store, and cannot be redownloaded after it is deleted.

== Growth ==
Amino received 1.65 million dollars of seed funding in 2014, primarily from Union Ventures. Some additional seed investors include Google Ventures, SV Angel, Box Group, and other interested parties.

By July 2014, Amino's apps were downloaded 500,000 times. Though only having 15 communities at that time, Amino eventually grew to have 41 communities in September 2015. Amino's apps had been downloaded 13 million times by July 2016. Fandoms had migrated from websites like Facebook and Reddit to Amino, partly because of the app's mobile-native experience.

Before 2016, when a user wanted to join a new Amino, they had to download another app for the Amino they wanted to join, with each apps name beginning with "Amino for:". In 2016, Amino Apps launched a centralized portal that hosted every Amino community in one app, meaning users no longer had to download multiple apps.

In July of the same year, ACM, an app that allowed users to create their own communities, was launched. This resulted in the number of communities on Amino skyrocketing to over 2.5 million as of June 2018.

== Features ==
The main feature of Amino was communities dedicated to a certain topic that users could join. Users could also chat with other members of a community in three ways: text, voice, or screening room, which allowed users to watch videos together while voice chatting. Other features include polls, blog posts, image posts, wiki entries, stories, and quizzes. In some cases, posts that were very well-made and had been noticed by a community's administration would end up receiving a feature, making it appear on the front page along with other featured content.

In 2018, a premium membership option called Amino+ was added. Amino+ comes with additional features such as exclusive stickers, the ability to make stickers, custom chat bubbles, high resolution images, and other perks. Membership can now only be purchased with money. Amino coins can be purchased or earned through enabling ads, watching ad videos, completing activities on the Offer Wall, and playing Lucky Draw when checking in, but are of little use due to the users not being able to buy Amino+ by amino coins anymore. Members can give and receive coins through props.

In 2019, Amino introduced six original short-form animated series, labelled "Amino Originals," produced by independent artists from across the internet. ATJ's "Little Red," a re-imagining of Little Red Riding Hood, premiered on November 15, 2019. "Little Red" was joined by five other shows in late December. Sophie Feher's "The Reef," a comedy featuring an aspiring marine biologist meeting a merman, premiered on December 27 alongside "Princely," an LGBT fairy tale created by Matt Bruneau-Richardson of Tiny Siren Animation. "Spaced Out," an alien abduction comedy by Michael Jae, and YouTuber Alex Clark's "Wyndvania II" premiered on December 28. Mysie Pereira's fairy tale "Turned to Stone" and Marcin Pawlowski's "Stranded" premiered on December 29, 2019.

== Administration ==
On each community, there were two types of staff members, these being ‘Leader’ and ‘Curator.’ Curators were usually the ones who feature posts, or post important announcements for users to see.

Curators were able to disable a post or public chat, delete comments or chat threads, manage featured content, manage posts in topic categories, and approve Wiki entries.

Leaders have more power than curators. In addition to curator powers, leaders could submit a community to be listed, change the Amino's features, change navigation, alter the community appearance, change the Amino's privacy settings, manage the Amino's join requests, send invites, appoint or demote Curators, strike or ban members, manage flagged content, change users' custom titles, manage topics and wiki categories, and create broadcasts (notifications sent for posts).

One leader would have had the status of agent. An agent was the primary leader of a community; the person who created the community was automatically agent. An agent had the ability to delete their community as long as it is not too large or too active. An agent could appoint and remove both leaders and curators. Agent status could be transferred voluntarily to another leader, curator, or community member. If an agent was inactive, Team Amino may have had assisted in transferring agent status.

== Apps ==
=== Amino Community Manager ===
Otherwise known as ACM, this application was what users use to create and manage their own community in Amino. This app allowed moderators to customize a community's theme, icon, and categories. ACM also allowed moderation to customize community descriptions, pick leaders, change language settings, create a tagline for the community, change the home page lay out, alter the side navigation menu, and more. Unlisted communities were able to change their community's title and Amino ID, but this was not an option once a community is listed. A leader could use ACM to submit a request for their community to be listed on the explore page, after which the community would have been reviewed by Team Amino for approval. Communities could be deleted on ACM, but only by the agent of that community.

== Guidelines ==
Amino had a set of guidelines that all communities must comply with. Amino did not allow harassment or hate, spam or self-promotion (including promotion of one's own Amino community), sexual/NSFW content, self harm, real graphic/gross content (fictional content is generally acceptable), unsafe/illegal content, or content that violates copyright. Communities were allowed to have additional rules so long as they do not violate Amino's rules. In addition to Amino's rules, users were required to be at least 13 years of age in the U.S. and 16 years of age in European Union countries. While sexual imagery was not allowed in any community and text based sexual content is not allowed in public areas, some private communities were allowed to discuss sexual themes. However, they were not exempt from Amino's rules on NSFW content.

If guidelines are broken, a leader would have been able to disable content or impose a warning, strike, or ban, depending on the severity of the infringement. A warning was a message informing the user that they have violated a guideline and may face further punishment unless they change their behaviour. A strike would put the user in read-only mode for up to 24 hours; this mode prevents the user from posting, chatting, or interacting with posts in that community. A ban removed the user from the community. Team Amino could separately issue users with strikes or bans across the entire platform.

== Controversies ==
In 2017, organizations in Argentina for the protection of minors reported inappropriate material on the app, ranging from pornography to material promoting suicide to underage users. In 2019, Abilene police in Texas released a statement that sexual predators were using Amino chat rooms to approach minors. In 2020, authorities from Christian County, Kentucky alerted parents about possible sexual predators on Amino.

In July 2025, the British Police identified Amino as one of several platforms used by a child exploitation network that had previously extorted minors in different countries in Europe and North America. Several families reported to the National Society for the Prevention of Cruelty to Children that pedophiles were using the app for the purpose of sexual role-playing with minors, citing various testimonies from victims as young as 15 years old.

Safety organizations and parental control groups had previously flagged the app as dangerous due to the presence of "sexual grooming" and the ease with which adults could contact minors.
