= Ameen Ali al-Akimi =

Yemeni politician (born 1959)

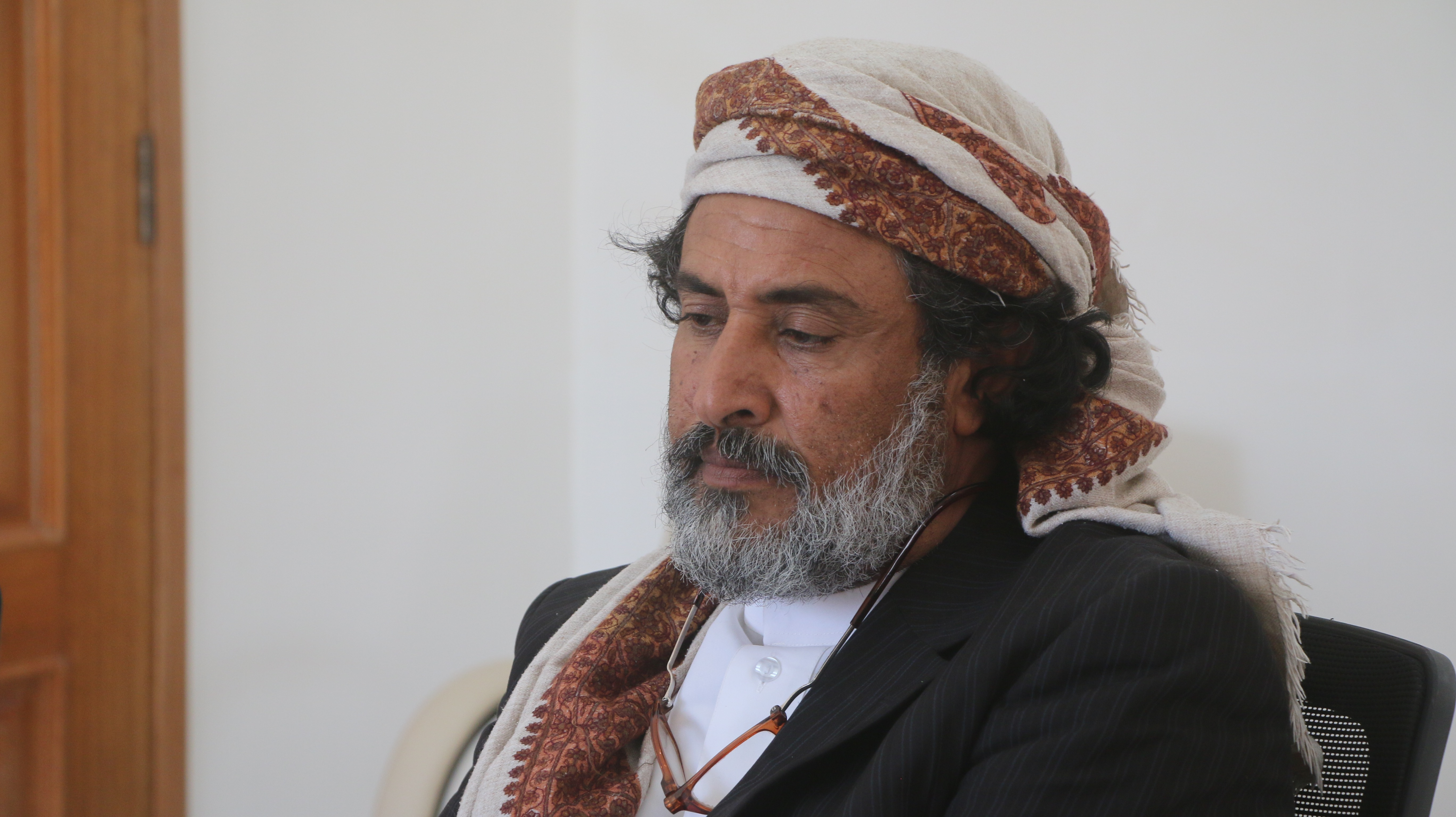

Member of the House of Representatives
- Incumbent
- Assumed office 27 April 2003

Governor of Al-Jawf Governorate
- In office 15 August 2016 – 10 October 2022
- President: Abdrabuh Mansour Hadi, Rashad al-Alimi

Personal details
- Born: 1959 (age 66–67) Al-Jawf Governorate
- Party: Al-Islah

Ameen Ali al-Akimi (Arabic: الشيخ أمين العكيمي; born 1959) is a Yemeni politician and MP. On 15 August 2016, he was appointed by Abdrabbuh Mansur Hadi as governor of Al-Jawf Governorate until 10 October 2022 when he was replaced with Hussein al-Aji al-Awadhi.

== Career ==
- Member of Parliament for three consecutive terms, for constituency No. (276) in Al-Jawf Governorate.
- Commander of the Border Guard battalions, and was promoted to the rank of colonel in 1994.
- Head of the Bakil Tribal Council, 2010.
- Commander of the Al-Nasr Brigade in Al-Jawf Governorate, and was promoted to the rank of brigadier general in 2015.
- Governor of Al-Jawf Governorate on August 15, 2016.
- Commander of the "Al-Jawf Axis", in addition to his work as governor of the governorate, and was promoted to the rank of the major general on July 7, 2018.
