= AMIN Worldwide =

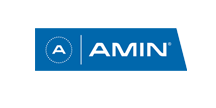
- Company type: Alliance
- Industry: Advertising, Marketing
- Founded: 1932
- Headquarters: Wayzata, Minnesota, Worldwide
- Area served: Worldwide
- Website: aminworldwide.com

AMIN Worldwide (Advertising and Marketing Independent Network) is a global alliance of independently owned advertising agencies. Its member agencies are located across Americas, Europe/Africa/Middle East, and the Pacific Rim.

== History ==
AMIN was formed in the US in 1932 as a way for full-service advertising agencies to share media and research resources.

AMIN Worldwide was named one of Fuel Lines' Top 14 Advertising Agency Networks.
