= Leo Amino =

Japanese-American sculptor

- Leo Amino standing on the balcony of the Black Mountain College Studies Building with his sculpture Anticipant, summer 1946. Photograph by Beaumont Newhall.
- Born: June 26, 1911; Taiwan, Japan (now Taiwan)
- Died: December 1, 1989 (aged 78); New York City
- Education: American Artists School
- Style: Abstract Expressionism
- Spouse: Julie Amino

Leo Amino (June 26, 1911 – December 1, 1989) was a Japanese-American sculptor known for his Abstract Expressionist sculptures created with a variety of materials, including wood, wire, and plastics.

== Biography ==
Born in 1911 in Taiwan, to Japanese parents, he spent much of his early life in Tokyo, where his father's calligraphy and his mother's floral design interested him in working in art. He immigrated to the United States in 1929, enrolling at San Mateo Junior College before briefly attending New York University.

In 1937 he began studying direct carving at under Chaim Gross at the American Artists School. His pieces were included in the 1939 New York World's Fair alongside those of Isamu Noguchi. Another influence was sculptor Henry Moore, whose work Amino encountered on a trip to England in 1938.

Amino’s sculpture Refractional #16, from 1966. Made of polyester resin.

Amino's artistic career was briefly halted by World War II, during which time he was made to work as a translator for the US Navy. After the war concluded, he noticed the increased availability of synthetic resin due to its use as a substitute for materials that were needed for the war effort. He became the first artist to experiment with and use synthetic resin as an artistic medium, alternating between resin and wood in his sculptures. Polyester resin was eventually developed into a transparent resin good at handling color, which Amino used in sculpting.

In the summers of 1946 and 1950, he taught at Black Mountain College, and from 1952 until 1977 he taught at Cooper Union.

Amino died on December 1, 1989, in New York City.

His work is held at institutions including the Asheville Art Museum, Carnegie Museum of Art, Los Angeles County Museum of Art, Montclair Art Museum, The Museum of Modern Art, Newark Museum, Smithsonian American Art Museum, Whitney Museum of American Art, and the Zimmerli Art Museum at Rutgers University.

== Group exhibitions ==
- Carvers-Modelers-Welders, Museum of Modern Art, New York (1950)
- American Sculpture, The Metropolitan Museum of Art, New York (1951)
- The New Decade: 35 American Painters and Sculptors, Whitney Museum of American Art (1955)
- Plastics, John Daniels Gallery (1965)
- A Plastic Presence, The Jewish Museum, New York (1970; also traveled to the Milwaukee Art Center and the San Francisco Museum of Art)
- Vital Forms: American Art and Design in the Atomic Age, Brooklyn Museum, New York (2001; also traveled to the Walker Art Center, Minneapolis; Frist Center for the Visual Arts, Nashville; San Diego Museum of Art; and Phoenix Art Museum)
- Black Mountain College: Una aventura americana, Museo Nacional Centro de Arte Reina Sofía, Madrid (2003)
- Leap Before You Look: Black Mountain College 1933–1957, Institute of Contemporary Art, Boston (2015–2016; also traveled to Hammer Museum, Los Angeles, 2016; and Wexner Center for the Arts, Columbus, 2016–2017)

== Solo exhibitions ==
- Polymorphic Sculpture: Leo Amino’s Experiments in Three Dimensions, Zimmerli Art Museum, Rutgers State University of New Jersey, New Brunswick (October 20, 2018—April 12, 2020)
- Leo Amino: The Visible and the Invisible, David Zwirner Gallery, New York (July 6-31, 2020)
- Leo Amino: Work with Material, Black Mountain College Museum + Arts Center, Asheville (September 30, 2022-January 7, 2023)

== Bibliography ==
- Hallmark, Kara Kelley (2007). Encyclopedia of Asian American Artists. Greenwood Publishing Group. ISBN 978-0313334511.
