= Ameen Albert Rihani =

Arab American literature professor (born 1942)

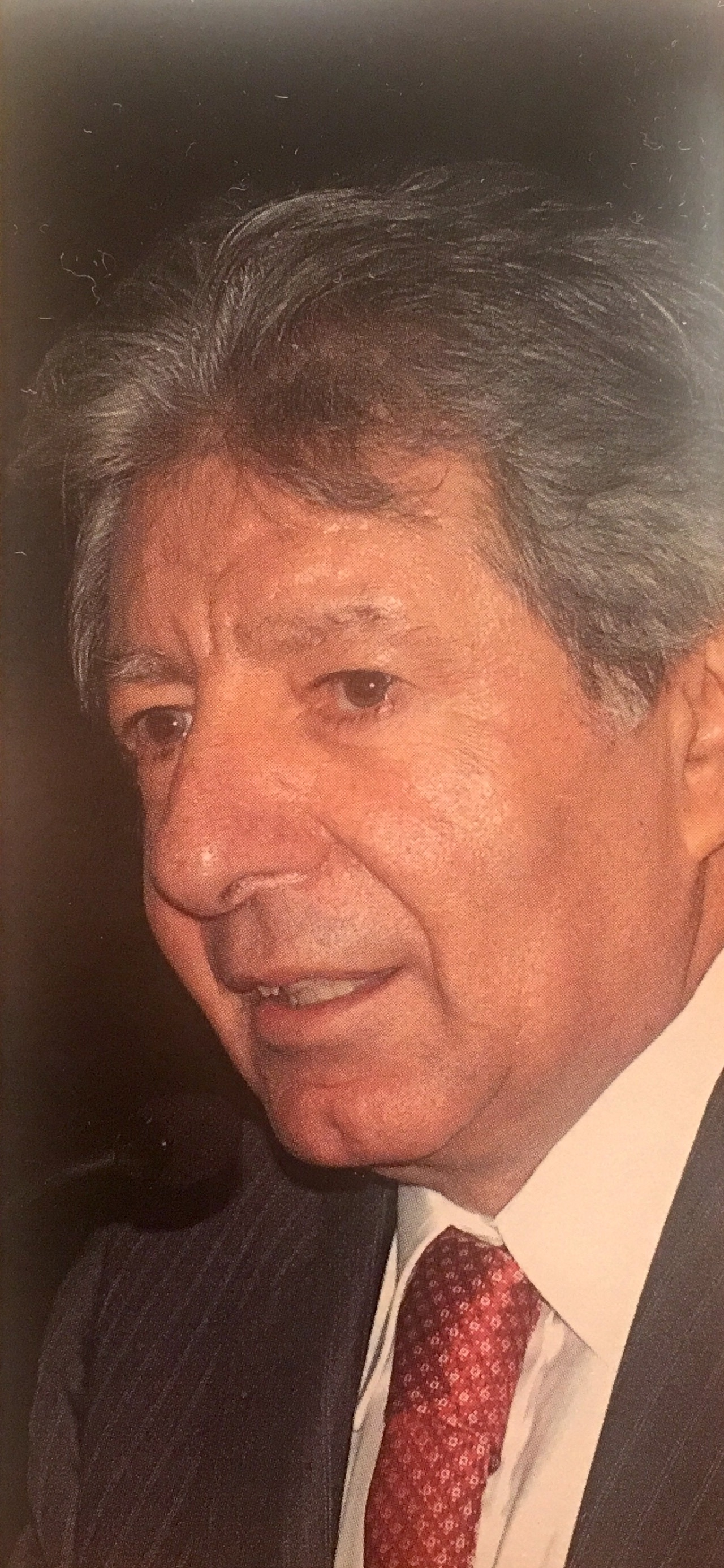
- Ameen Albert Rihani
- Born: Ameen Albert Rihani; July 5, 1942 (age 84); Beirut, Lebanon

Ameen Albert Rihani (born July 5, 1942 in Beirut) is a university professor, scholar and administrator. He is a professor of Arab American literature at Notre Dame University - Louiaze. He was the Vice President of Academic Affairs since 1997. In 2013 he became advisor to the President of NDU and the Secretary General of the Institute of Lebanese Thought.

== Early life and education ==
Rihani earned a BA degree in political science in 1965 and an MA degree in Arabic literature in 1971, both from the American University of Beirut. Later, he earned his Ph.D. in bilingual comparative literature in 1996 from the Lebanese University. Rihani is the nephew of the well-known author Ameen Rihani.

== Career ==
Professor Rihani taught literature, philosophy, education, modern Arab thought at the American University of Beirut and the Lebanese American University. He lectured in these subjects at universities in the United States and the Arab World for the last two decades. Ameen Albert Rihani is the author of seventeen books and a number of journal articles. He has also edited conference proceedings.

Rihani has also published analysis and criticism of the work of his uncle Ameen Rihani. He also writes and lectures about Lebanese literature and its effect on western society.

Rihani was appointed in 2014 to be the director of the Institute of Lebanese Thought at Notre Dame University, Lebanon, and has since created a groundbreaking platform of Lebanon's intellectual history.

== Membership ==
Professor Rihani is a member of several international associations, among which are: the Association of College Administration Professionals (ACAP), Virginia; the American Association of School Administrators (AASA); the Association of Lebanese Writers (Itihad Al-Kuttab Al-Lubnaniyeen), Beirut, Lebanon; the Association for Supervision and Curriculum Development (ASCD), Washington D.C.; the Association for the Advancement of International Education (AAIE); the President of the Teachers Association of the International College (TAIC), Beirut, and the President of the Lebanese Youth League, Beirut.

== Recognition ==
The winner of the Suad as-Subah first literary Award for 2003 for his work Forgotten Springs, Rihani was also recognized in 2006 as a distinguished author for his outstanding literary and philosophic work A Train and No Station by the Suad as-Subah Literary Committee. A special entry introduced him in the Encyclopedia of the 21st Century Intellectuals, published in Cambridge, U.K. 2008 In March 2010, Ameen Albert Rihani was chosen among ten other authors from the American University of Beirut for an honorary ceremony in recognition of “his distinguished contributions in the world of literature”. On February 26, 2014, Notre Dame University organized a symposium around the works of Ameen Albert Rihani. Professor Zahia Darwiche Jabbour, the Secretary General of the Lebanese National Commission for UNESCO, among other speakers, highlighted the multicultural intellectual aspect of Rihani's works as an example for scholars of the 21st century.

== Books ==
- The Philosophy of Multiculturalism, (2020), Noor Publishing, Dusseldorf, Germany.
- Pericles, Sina’atu Watanen min Khuyouti Rabi’il Ya’ss (Pericles, Manufacturing a Homeland from the Threads of the Spring's Despair), (2018). A play in Four Acts. Sa’er Al Mashreq Publishers, Beirut, Lebanon.
- Safwat-ul Falsaf-al Rihaniyya (Rihani Summa Philosophica), (2016), Double Pinetree Publishing, Beirut, Lebanon.
- Tajawuz-ul Hutaam (Beyond the Wreck),(2013). Arab Scientific Publishers, Beirut.
- Saheel-ul Aghaani-l Haa'irah (The Neigh of Wondering Songs), (2009). An-Nahar Publishers, Beirut.
- Multiculturalism and Arab American Literature, (2007), Platform International, Washington, D.C., U.S.A.
- Qitar wa la Mahattah (A Train and No Station), (2006), Nelson Publishers, Beirut.
- Ushbat-ul Mada'en (Cities' Grass),(2002), An-Nahar Publishers, Beirut.
- Al Yanabee' Al Mansyiah (Forgotten Springs), (2002), Riyad Ar-Rayyess Publishers, London.
- Tukus-ul Ma'a, Rasa'il ila Serene (Water Rituals),(1999), Dar Sader, Beirut.
- Aqaleem-un Nafs-il Mutamadia (Provinces of a Far Going Soul),(1996), Dar Al-Jadeed, Beirut.
- Lughaat-un Arabiyah (Arabic Languages), (1994) Dar Al-Jadeed, Beirut.
- Faylasuf-ul Freike (The Philosopher of Freike),(1986), Al-Jeel Publishers, Beirut.
- Wa Yasqutu-l 'Umru 'an Darrajah (And Life Falls From a Bicycle), (1987), Al-Jeel Publishers, Beirut.
- Maraya Muta'akisah (Confronting Mirrors), (1982), Al-Kitab Al-Lubnani Publishing House, Beirut.
- Qira’at āla Wajhiha War-Raheel (Readings on Her Face and Departure), (1981), The Arab Institute for Research and Publishing, Beirut.
- Madaar-ul-Kalimah (The Word's Wandering Sphere), (1980), Al-Kitab Al-Lubnani Publishing House, Beirut, and Al-Kitab Al-Misri Publishing House, Cairo.
- Qalamun Yafukk-ur Rasd (The Breakthrough Pen), (1977), Al-Kitab Al-Lubnani Publishing House, Beirut, and Al-Kitab Al-Misri Publishing House, Cairo.
- Āla Difaaf-il-‘Urjuwaan (On the Edge of Purple), (1970), The Rihani Printing and Publishing House, Beirut.
- Lumā Mashrikiyyah (Oriental Sparkles), (1966), The Rihani Printing and Publishing House, Beirut.
