= List of educational video websites =

This is a list of notable websites which provide access to educational video as one of their primary functions.

Name	Discipline(s)	Description	Access cost	License	Provider(s)
60second Recap	Literature	Educational videos	Free	?	60secondcap
Academic Earth	Multidisciplinary	Lectures from universities	Free	?	Academic Earth
Coursera	Multidisciplinary	Educational courses with lectures, quizzes and exams provided by universities for free. Certificates are provided by the respective university on successful completion of a course.	Free	?	Coursera
Crash Course (YouTube)	Multidisciplinary	Educational courses in physical and social sciences, philosophy, history, culture and literature.	Free	?	Crash Course (YouTube)
Do Lectures	Multidisciplinary	Videos of live talks and lectures.	Free	Creative Commons Attribution-NonCommercial-NoDerivatives	YouTube
EdX	Multidisciplinary	Educational courses with lectures, quizzes and exams provided by universities for free.	Free/Paid	?	EdX
FORA.tv	Multidisciplinary	Academic videos	Free/subscription	?	FORA.tv
Geoset	Multidisciplinary	Academic videos, mainly covering science, engineering and technology	Free	?	Florida State University
The Great Courses	Multidisciplinary	Educational videos with expert-led courses, tutorials and documentaries	Paid	?	The Great Courses
Gresham College	Multidisciplinary	Institution with a history of "free public lectures" hosts many online.	Free	?	Gresham College
IRIS Consortium	Multidisciplinary	Educational Earth-science videos, animations, lessons for educators. Animations/videos have been reviewed and evaluated by scientists/specialists in the specific discipline.	Free	Creative Commons Attribution-NonCommercial-ShareAlike	IRIS Consortium
iTunesU	Multidisciplinary	Lectures from universities	Free (requires iTunes software)	?	Apple Inc.
Khan Academy	Multidisciplinary	Video lessons	Free	Creative Commons Attribution-NonCommercial-ShareAlike	Khan Academy
Lesson Planet	Multidisciplinary	Videos reviewed by academics	Free/subscription	?	Lesson Planet
Lynda.com (Acquired by LinkedIn)	Multidisciplinary	Software, creative, and business skills	Subscription	?	Lynda.com (Redirects to LinkedIn)
LinkedIn Learning	Multidisciplinary	Videos, Software, creative, and business skills	Subscription	?	LinkedIn
MIT World	Multidisciplinary	Videos	Free	?	MIT
Pluralsight	Multidisciplinary	For software developers, IT administrators, and creative professionals	Subscription	?	Pluralsight
ResearchChannel	Multidisciplinary	Educational television station with an Internet presence was funded by the University of Washington until 2010. (defunct)	Free	?	University of Washington (former)
Royal Society for the encouragement of Arts, Manufactures & Commerce	Multidisciplinary	Videos from RSA events	Free	?	Royal Society for the encouragement of Arts, Manufactures & Commerce
SchoolTube	Multidisciplinary	Videos	Free/subscription	?	SchoolTube
TeacherTube	Multidisciplinary	Academic videos	Free	?	TeacherTube
Teaching Channel	Multidisciplinary, education	Videos emphasize teaching practices on a variety of topics.	Free/subscription	?	Teaching Channel
TED (Technology, Entertainment, Design)	Multidisciplinary	Covers topics in various fields. Presentations are limited to 20 minutes.	Free	Creative Commons Attribution-NonCommercial-NoDerivatives	TED (conference)
VideoLectures.NET	Multidisciplinary	Free and open access educational video lectures repository	Free	?	VideoLectures.NET
Wondrium	Multidisciplinary	Educational videos with expert-led courses, tutorials and documentaries	Paid/Subscription	?	Wondrium
YouTube EDU	Multidisciplinary	Videos uploaded by universities	Free	?	YouTube

== See also ==
- List of online video platforms
- List of academic databases and search engines
- List of online databases
- List of online encyclopedias
