= Social learning (social pedagogy) =

Social learning (social pedagogy) is learning that takes place at a wider scale than individual or group learning, up to a societal scale, through social interaction between peers.

== Definition ==
Social learning is defined as learning through the observation of other people's behaviors. It is a process of social change in which people learn from each other in ways that can benefit wider social-ecological systems. Different social contexts allow individuals to pick up new behaviors by observing what people are doing within that environment. Social learning and social pedagogy emphasize the dynamic interaction between people and the environment in the construction of meaning and identity.

The process of learning a new behaviour starts by observing a behaviour, taking the information in and finally adopting that behaviour. Examples of environmental contexts that promote social learning are schools, media, family members and friends.

If learning is to be considered as social, then it must:

1. demonstrate that a change in understanding has taken place in the individuals involved;
2. demonstrate that this change goes beyond the individual and becomes situated within wider social units or communities of practice;
3. occur through social interactions and processes between actors within a social network.

It is a theoretical system that focuses on the development of the child and how practice and training affect their life skills. This idea is centered around the notion that children are active and competent.

== History ==
=== 18th century ===
Jean-Jacques Rousseau brings forth the idea that all humans are born good but are ultimately corrupted by society, implying a form of social learning.

=== 19th century ===
The literature on the topic of social pedagogy tends to identify German educator Karl Mager (1810-1858) as the person who coined the term ‘social pedagogy’ in 1844. Mager and Friedrich Adolph Diesterweg shared the belief that education should go beyond the individual's acquisition of knowledge and focus on the acquisition of culture by society. Ultimately, it should benefit the community itself.

=== 1900s - 1950s ===
Developmental psychology focused on the theories of behaviorism from B.F. Skinner and Sigmund Freud’s psychoanalytic theory to explain how humans learn new behaviours.

The founding father of social pedagogy, German philosopher and educator Paul Natorp (1854-1924) published the book Sozialpädagogik: Theorie der Willensbildung auf der Grundlage der Gemeinschaft (Social Pedagogy: The theory of educating the human will into a community asset) in 1899. Natorp argued that in all instances, pedagogy should be social. Teachers should consider the interaction between educational and societal processes.

=== 1950s - 1990s ===
The field of developmental psychology underwent significant changes during these decades as social learning theories started to gain traction through the research and experiments of Psychologists such as Julian Rotter, Albert Bandura and Robert Sears. In 1954, Julian Rotter developed his social learning theory which linked human behavior changes with environmental interactions. Predictable variables were behavior potential, expectancy, reinforcement value and psychological situation. Bandura conducted his bobo doll experiment in 1961 and developed his social learning theory in 1977. These contributions to the field of developmental psychology cemented a strong knowledge foundation and allowed researchers to build on and expand our understanding of human behavior.

== Theories ==
=== Jean-Jacques Rousseau - Natural Man ===
Jean-Jacques Rousseau (1712 - 1778), with his book Emile, or On Education, introduced his pedagogic theory where the child should be brought up in harmony with nature. The child should be introduced to society only during the fourth stage of development, the age of moral self-worth (15 to 18 years of age). That way, the child enters society in an informed and self-reliable manner, with one's own judgment. Rousseau's conceptualization of childhood and adolescence is based on his theory that human beings are inherently good but corrupted a society that denaturalize them. Rousseau is the precursor of the child-centered approach in education.

=== Karl Mager - Social Pedagogy ===
Karl Mager (1810 - 1858) is often identified as the one who coined the term social pedagogy. He held the belief that education should focus on the acquisition of knowledge but also of culture through society and should orient its activities to benefit the community. It also implies that knowledge should not solely come from individuals but also from the larger concept of society.

=== Paul Natorp - Social Pedagogy ===
Paul Natorp (1854 - 1924) was a German philosopher and educator. In 1899, he published Sozialpädagogik: Theorie der Willensbildung auf der Grundlage der Gemeinschaft (Social Pedagogy: The theory of educating the human will into a community asset). According to him, education should be social, thus an interaction between educational and social processes. Natorp believed in the model of Gemeinschaft (small community) in order to build universal happiness and achieve true humanity. At the time, philosophers like Jean-Jacques Rousseau, John Locke, Johann Heinrich Pestalozzi and Immanuel Kant were preoccupied by the structure of society and how it may influence human interrelations. Philosophers were not solely thinking of the child as an individual but rather at what he/she can bring to creating human togetherness and societal order.

Natorp's perspective was influenced by Plato's ideas about the relation between the individual and the city-state (polis). The polis is a social and political structure of society that, according to Plato, allows individuals to maximize their potential. It is strictly structured with classes serving others and philosopher kings setting universal laws and truths for all. Furthermore, Plato argued for the need to pursue intellectual virtues rather than personal advancements such as wealth and reputation. Natorp's interpretation of the concept of the polis is that an individual will want to serve his/her community and state after having been educated, as long as the education is social (Sozialpädagogik).

Natorp focused on education for the working class as well as social reform. His view of social pedagogy outlined that education is a social process and social life is an educational process. Social pedagogic practices are a deliberative and rational form of socialization. Individuals become social human beings by being socialized into society. Social pedagogy involves teachers and children sharing the same social spaces.

=== Herman Nohl - Hermeneutic Perspective ===
Herman Nohl (1879 - 1960) was a German pedagogue of the first half of the twentieth century. He interpreted reality from a hermeneutical perspective (methodological principles of interpretation) and tried to expose the causes of social inequalities. According to Nohl, social pedagogy's aim is to foster the wellbeing of student by integrating into society youth initiatives, programs and efforts. Teachers should be advocates for the welfare of their students and contribute to the social transformations it entails. Nohl conceptualized a holistic educative process that takes into account the historical, cultural, personal and social contexts of any given situation.

=== Robert Sears - Social Learning ===
Robert Richardson Sears (1908 - 1989) focused his research mostly on the stimulus-response theory. Much of his theoretical effort was expended on understanding the way children come to internalize the values, attitudes, and behaviours of the culture in which they are raised. Just like Albert Bandura, he focused most of his research on aggression, but also on the growth of resistance to temptation and guilt, and the acquisition of culturally-approved sex-role behaviors. Sears wanted to prove the importance of the place of parents in the child's education, concentrating on features of parental behaviour that either facilitated or hampered the process. Such features include both general relationship variables such as parental warmth and permissiveness and specific behaviours such as punishment in the form of love withdrawal and power assertion.

=== Albert Bandura - Social Learning ===
Albert Bandura advanced the social learning theory by including the individual and the environment in the process of learning and imitating behaviour. In other words, children and adults learn or change behaviours by imitating behaviours observed in others. Albert Bandura mentions that the environment plays an important role as it is the stimuli that triggers the learning process. For example, according to Bandura (1978), people learn aggressive behaviour through 3 sources: Family members, community and mass media. Research shows that parent who prefer aggressive solution to solve their problems tend to have children who use aggressive tactics to deal with other people. Research also found that communities in which fighting prowess are valued have a higher rate of aggressive behaviour. Also, findings show that watching televisions can have at least 4 different effect on people: 1) it teaches aggressive style of conduct, 2) it alters restraints over aggressive behavior,3) it desensitizes and habituate people to violence and 4) it shapes people's image of reality. The environment also allows people to learn through another person's experience. For example, students don't cheat on exams (at least no openly) because they know the consequences of it, even if they never experienced the consequences themselves

However, still according to Banduras, the learning process does not stop at the influence of the family, community and media, the internal process (individual thoughts, values, etc.) will determine at which frequency and which intensity an individual will imitate and adopt a certain behaviour. Indeed, parents plays an important role in a child's education for two reasons: Firstly, because of the frequency and intensity of the interactions and secondly because the children often admire their parent and often take them as role models. Therefore, even if the stimuli is the parents' interactions with their children, if their child did not admire them, their children would not reproduce their behaviour as often. That is the main difference between early social learning theory and Bandura's point of view. This principle is called reciprocal determinism, which means that the developmental process is bidirectional, and that the individual has to value his environment in order to learn for it. Bandura also states that this process starts at births; indeed, research shows that infants are more receptive to certain experiences and less to others. Albert Bandura also says that most human behaviours are driven by goals and that we regulate our behaviour through weighing the benefits and the troubles that we can get into because of a particular behaviour.

== Application in education and pedagogy ==
Social learning and social pedagogy has proven its efficiency with the application in practical professions, like nursing, where the student can observe a trained professional in a professional/work settings, and they can learn about nursing throughout all its aspects: interactions, attitudes, co-working skills and the nursing job itself. Students who have taken part in social learning state that they increased their nursing skills, and that it could only be possible with a good learning environment, a good mentor, and a student who is assertive enough. It means that social learning can be achieved with a good mentor, but one needs to be a good listener too. This mentoring experience creates what Albert Bandura called observational learning, when students observe a well-trained model/teacher and the students' knowledge and understanding increase.

Experiences in the field for student teachers are a good way to show how social pedagogy and social learning contribute to one's education. Indeed, field experiences are part of a student's life in their route to their teaching degree. Field experiences are based on the social learning theory; a student follows a teacher for some time, at first observing the cooperating teacher and taking notes about the teaching act. The second part of the field experience is actual teaching, and receiving feedback from the role model and the students. The student teachers try as much as they can to imitate what they have learned by observing their cooperating teacher.

Cyberbullying being an issue in schools, social pedagogy can be a solution to decrease this trend. Indeed, the bullied pupil can build a relationship with a particular mentor or role model, which in return can empower the student to deal with issues such as cyberbullying. This can work both on the victim and the bully, since both may lack confidence and affection. Using social pedagogy instead of punishments and reactive actions is also a way to derive from the traditional model of raising children, and teaching, which relies on punishments and rewards.

Parent education is also based on social learning. From birth, children look at their parents and try to model what they do, how they talk, and what they think. Of course, a child's environment is much larger than only their familiar environment, but it is an influential part. A study by Dubanoski and Tanabe, was made on parenting and social learning, where parents had to attend classes that would teach them social learning principles to improve their children's behaviour. The classes taught the parents how to record objectively their children's behaviour, and to deal with them by teaching the correct behaviour, not by punishing the wrong one. A significant number of parents improve their children behaviour by the end of the study.

== Social media and technology ==
=== Benefits ===
Social pedagogy is in fact the interaction between society and the individual, which create a learning experience. Therefore, if talking about the current development of social pedagogy and social learning, the recent trend in term of learning in our society, is the use of social media and other forms of technology. On one side, if well designed within an educational framework, social media can surely help with the development of certain essential skills:

- Digital literacy
- Independence and self-learning
- Networking
- Knowledge management
- Decision-making
- Collaboration/teamwork

Therefore, it can be seen that social media can be useful for developing some of the key skills needed in this digital age. For instance, “the main feature of social media is that they empower the end user to access, create, disseminate and share information easily in a user-friendly, open environment". Social media can be used as a tool for accessibility. By allowing social media in the pedagogical program of students, it could help them to grow and fully participate in our digital society. Social media enables teachers to set online group work, based on cases or projects, and students can collect data in the field, without any need for direct face-to-face contact with either the teacher or other students.

=== Disadvantages ===
The benefits of social media in education stipulate how easier the communication between individuals becomes. However, others will argue that it excludes the vital tacit knowledge that direct, face-to-face interpersonal contact enables, and that social learning is bound up with physical and spatial learning. Social learning includes sharing experiences and working with others. Social media facilitates those experiences but make it less effective by eliminating the physical interaction between individuals. The more time students spend on social sites, the less time they spend socializing in person. Because of the lack of nonverbal cues, like tone and inflection, the use of social media is not an adequate replacement for face-to-face communication. Students who spend a great amount of time on social networking sites are less effective at communicating in person.

With the increasing presence of social media across many cultures, the difference between using technology as a tool and not as an end in itself needs to be understood.

== See also ==
- Pedagogy
- Andragogy
- Poliglota – start-up of language learning based on social groups in public places
- Chamilo – an open-source learning management system incorporating a social learning features set
- Docsity – a social learning network for international students and professionals
- Social learning tools
- Social skills
- Social pedagogy
