= Social learning =

Social learning may refer to:

- Social learning theory, a perspective that states that people learn within a social context. It is facilitated through concepts such as modeling and observational learning
- Observational learning, learning that occurs as a function of observing, retaining and replicating behavior observed in one's environment or other people
- Social learning (social pedagogy), a theory of education that acquisition of social competence happens exclusively or primarily in a social group

== See also ==
- Social learning tools, used for pedagogical and androgogical purposes that utilize social software and/or social media
