= Tim Kurzbach =

German politician

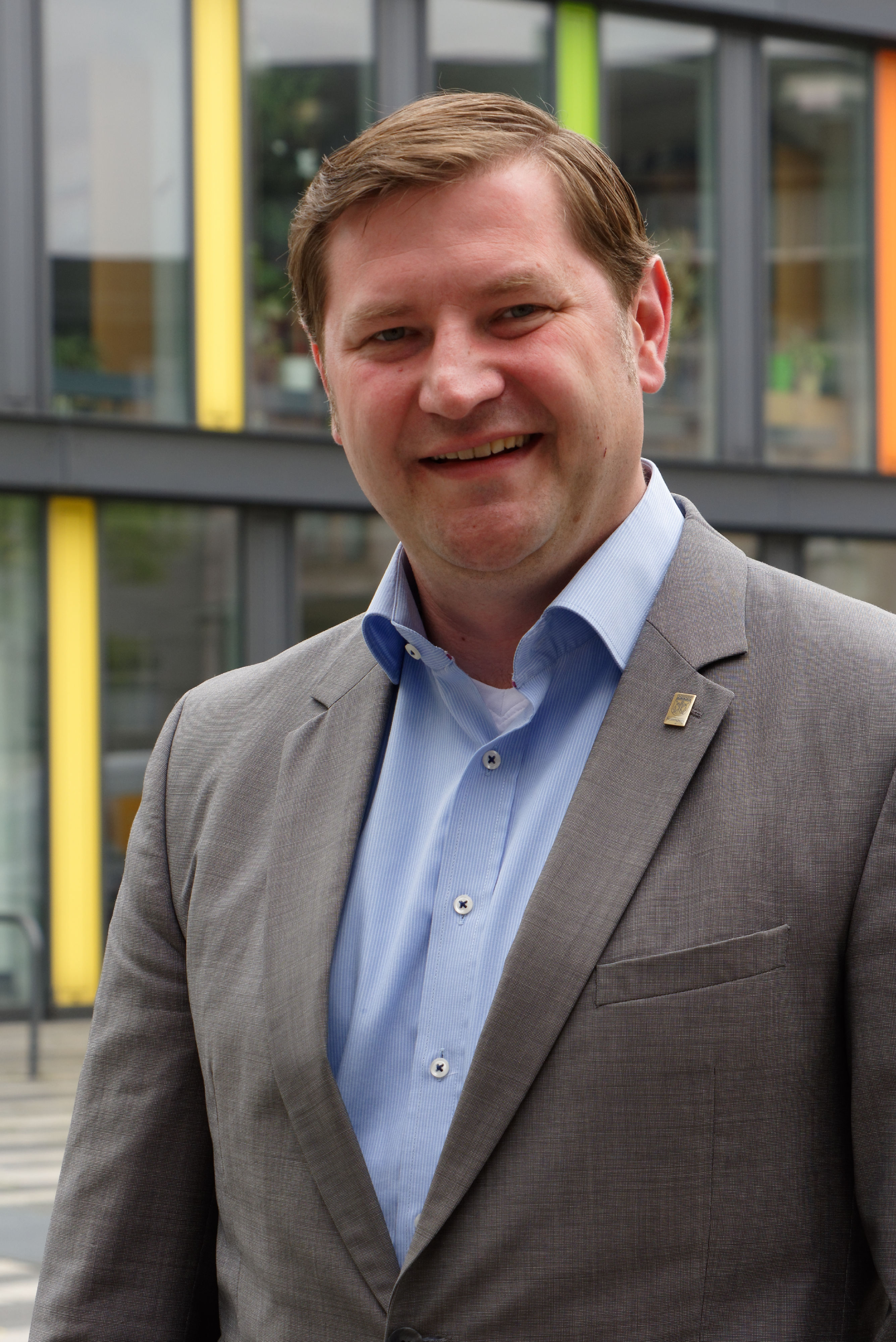
Mayor Tim Kurzbach standing before the town hall in Central Solingen (2017)

Tim-Oliver Kurzbach (born 27 April 1978) is a German politician who has been the mayor of the city of Solingen in North Rhine-Westphalia since 2015.

== Background, schooling, professional activities, and personal life ==
Tim Kurzbach, the son of a mechanic and a housewife, grew up with his younger brother in a Catholic, middle-class family in the Solingen neighborhood of Ohligs. From 1984 to 1988 he attended the community elementary school on Solingen's Südstraße. Until 1991 he was an altar server under Monsignor Heinz-Manfred Jansen in the Catholic church community St. Joseph in Solingen-Ohligs. In 1988, Kurzbach transferred to the Albert-Schweitzer Secondary School in Solingen-Wald, where he graduated with a vocational school certificate in 1994. When he was in secondary school, he was active in the parish and youth work of St. Joseph in Solingen-Ohligs. In 1996, Kurzbach acquired his advanced technical college certificate (with a focus in social pedagogy) at the Mildred-Scheel Vocational College in the neighborhood of Solingen-Merscheid. From 1996 to 1997 he lived in Pamplona, Spain. From the winter semester of 1997/98 onwards, he studied social work at the technical college in the German city of Cologne, obtaining a degree in 2006.

From 1998 to 2005, he was Chairman of the German Catholic Youth Association (GCYA) in Remscheid and Solingen. From 1999 to 2004 he was the District Team Leader of the German Red Cross (GRC) in Solingen and later, until 2011, of the Red Cross in the entire district of the city of Düsseldorf. In addition, he worked as Associate Labor Judge on a voluntary basis at the Solingen Labor Court until 2015. Since 2014, he has served as Deputy Chairman of the Catholic Youth Organization "Bergisch Land".

Until his election as Mayor of Solingen in 2015, he was a full-time member of the district association of the Solingen Workers' Welfare Association's board.

Kurzbach is the father of three sons and lives with his wife, the former Green Party city councillor Ursula Linda Kurzbach, in Solingen-Ohligs. Kurzbach is a practicing Catholic and active member of the parish of St. Sebastian in Ohligs, where he also works as a lecturer in church services. Since 2014, he has served as Chairman of the Diocesan Council in the Archdiocese of Cologne, which represents close to 2.1 million Catholics in the German Rhineland. Kurzbach is a supporter of 1. FC Köln.

== Political career ==
=== SPD City Council (2004 to 2015) ===
As a 23-year-old social pedagogy student, Kurzbach joined the Social Democratic Party of Germany (SPD) in 2001. From 1999 to 2015 he served as a member of the Youth Welfare Committee, and from 2004 to 2015 as the city councillor for the SPD in Solingen. The SPD faction elected him as parliamentary group leader in 2012, and Kurzbach held this seat until 2015.

=== Mayor of Solingen (2015-present) ===
==== Mayoral election (2015) ====
On 30 November 2013, Kurzbach was chosen by the SPD as candidate for the Solingen Mayoral Election at the Nomination Party Conference in September 2015. In 2015, the Green Party's Solingen District Association decided to also pledge support, and put Kurzbach forward as a joint candidate. In a runoff election taking place on 27 September 2015, Kurzbach won with 55.61% of the vote. His opponent, representing the Christian Democratic Union of Germany (CDU), was Frank Feller, who received 44.39% of the vote. On 21 October 2015, Kurzbach, succeeding Norbert Feith (CDU), was sworn in as the 20th mayor of Solingen. He has been the patron of the Solinger Tafel wishlist campaign since 2016.

==== Mayoral election (2020) ====
In March 2018, Kurzbach stated that he would run for mayoral reelection. Kurzbach's candidacy was supported by the majority of the Solingen SPD and the Green Party. On 30 May 2020, 96 of the 98 SPD members voted for Kurzbach, with two members opposed, while 29 of the 30 Green Party members also voted for him. On 13 September 2020, Kurzbach won an absolute majority, with 55.3% of the Solingen electorate voting for him during the first round.

Kurzbach's second mayoral term ends as usual on 31 October 2025.

==== Investigations into possible involvement in smuggling activities (2024) ====
In June 2024, it was revealed that investigations had been launched against Kurzbach due to his possible involvement in the activities of a smuggling ring; connections with party donations during 2019 and 2020 were also being investigated.

== Political offices ==
- 2004–2015: SPD City Councillor on the Solingen City Council
- 2012–2015: SPD Group Chairman on the Solingen City Council
- 2004–2015: Chairman of the supervisory board for "Centers for the Elderly gGmbH" in the city of Solingen
- 2015–present: Chairman of the Management Boards of City Savings Banks in Solingen
- 2016–present: Observer/Member on the Board of the SPD in North Rhine-Westphalia
- 2019–present: Deputy Chairman of the Rhine-Ruhr metropolitan region
- 2022–present: Member of the Board of the North Rhine-Westphalia Association of Cities and Towns
