= Transport Research Arena =

Transport Research Arena (TRA) is a conference on transport and mobility in Europe. It was initiated in 2006 and takes place every two years in a different European city. TRA is co-organised by the European Commission and supported by the European Technology Platforms ERTRAC (European Road Transport Research Advisory Council), ERRAC (European Rail Research Advisory Council), WATERBORNE as well as CEDR (Conference of European Directors of Roads) and ALICE (Alliance for Logistics Innovation through Collaboration), ETRA (European Transport Research Alliance) and ECTP (European Construction Technology Platform).

The transport sector plays a strategic and major role in the European single market and in a fast changing economic and societal frame. Policies, technologies and behaviours must be continually adapted to new constraints, such as climate change, the diminishing supply of fossil energy, the economic crisis, the increased demand for mobility, safety and security, etc. Transport infrastructures, vehicles and vessels, modal share, co-modality, urban planning, energy and environment issues are the subject of extensive studies, research works and industrial innovations, conducted by universities, research institutes, companies, practitioners, and public authorities.

The conference topics address the main challenges in transport and mobility of people and goods, with respect to energy, environment, safety and security and socio-economic issues. TRA aims at exploring the most advanced research works and innovations, the latest technological and industrial developments and implementations, and innovative policies, in Europe and worldwide. As a wide forum open to all interested parties, it is a unique occasion to promote and improve efficiency in transport.

== 2022 Lisbon, Portugal ==
The 2022 event was scheduled to be held in Lisbon, Portugal from 14 to 17 November 2022.

== 2020 Helsinki, Finland ==
The 8th TRA was scheduled to be held in Helsinki from 26 to 30 April 2020, organised by the Finnish Transport Safety Agency(Trafi) with additional financial support from the European Commission.

== 2018 Vienna, Austria ==
The 7th Transport Research Arena (TRA) took place in Vienna from 16 to 19 April 2018 at the Venue Reed Messe Wien. Under the motto “a digital era for transport - solutions for society, economy and environment", about 3,500 international experts discussed the latest research results and future developments in mobility and transport.

TRA 2018 was hosted by the Federal Ministry for Transport, Innovation and Technology as Chair of the Management Committee, the Austrian Institute for Technology as Chair of the Programme Committee and AustriaTech as Chair of the Organising Committee

The TRA 2018 was set up as a Green Event. The TRA 2018 would be one of the first green events of this size. A "Green Meeting" is characterised by higher energy efficiency, waste avoidance and environmentally benign travel of the guests to and from the event.

TRA addresses the major challenges and opportunities in terms of digitalization and decarbonisation.

Key topics discussed were: Shaping the New Mobility Landscape – a Vision for Transport & Mobility for Europe; How Digitalisation is transforming the Transport & Mobility System; Decarbonisation & Future Growth – How to change our Mobility System & remain competitive; Shaping Future Transport Research in Europe

A parallel exhibition was organized organised for governmental and professional organisations, public and private research organisations and industrial companies.

== 2016 Warsaw, Poland ==
The sixth TRA was held from 18 to 21 April 2016 at the PGE Narodowy in stadium in Warsaw, Poland with the theme of "Moving Forward: Innovative Solutions for Tomorrow's Mobility". It was organised by the Polish Road and Bridge Research Institute (IBDiM) and the Ministry of Infrastructure and Development of the Republic of Poland . ETRA and ECTP joined this time as Supporting Organisations.

== 2014 Paris, France ==
The fifth TRA was held at the CNIT in the Paris business district of Paris-La Défense in April 2014. IFSTTAR was delegated by the French Ministry of Ecology, Sustainable Development and Energy to organise the event.

== 2012 Athens, Greece ==
The fourth TRA was organised in Athens by the Greek Ministry of Transport represented by Egnatia Odos S.A. Held from 23 to 26 April, the event attracted 1,600 delegates and was the first TRA to cover all surface transport modes with the added support ERRAC and Waterborne technology platforms.

== 2010 Brussels, Belgium ==
The third TRA was jointly organised by the Flemish and Wallonian Road Administrations in Brussels. The scope of the conference was extended to include a more multimodal flavour.

== 2008 Ljubljana, Slovenia ==
The second TRA was organised by the Slovenia Road Agency in Ljubljana. The event was sponsored by the European Commission, ERTRAC and CEDR. VideoLectures.net covered many of the key sessions. EC Commissioner Janez Potočnik gave the opening address.

TRA2008 was the first to include the Young Research Area of Research awards. The competition for European postgraduate and final year undergraduate students working in road transport research was funded by the European Commission's FP7 and coordinated by University College Dublin. Other partners included FEHRL, ZAG and Continental Automotive. This has since evolved into the TRA VISIONS awards for young and senior researchers.

== 2006 Göteborg, Sweden ==
The first TRA was organised by the Swedish Road Administration in the City of Gothenburg on 12–15 June. The event was sponsored by the Conference of European Directors of Roads (CEDR), the European Commission and ERTRAC.
