= CEDR =

CEDR may refer to:

- The Centre for Effective Dispute Resolution, London, UK
- The Conference of European Directors of Roads (Conférence Européenne des Directeurs des Routes), Brussels
