= Samaritan Fundraising =

Samaritan Fundraising is a national fundraising company solely dedicated to support churches, ministries, schools, and other faith-based organizations reach their fundraising goal.

Headquartered in Fairfax, Virginia, Samaritan Fundraising is owned and operated by Salem Communications, the country's leading Christian radio broadcaster, Internet content provider, and Christian magazine and book publisher.

As of 2024, the Good Samaritan program supports over 390 residents across PMMA’s 16 communities.

== History ==
Tom Freiling founded Samaritan Fundraising in April 2009 after leaving Xulon Press, the online book publishing company that he started in September 2001 and eventually sold to Salem Web Network.

=== Acquisition by Salem Web Network ===
Samaritan Fundraising was acquired by Salem Web Network, the online division of Salem Communications Corporation, in September 2010.

== Products ==
=== Samaritan Card ===
The Samaritan Card is a wallet-size shopping discount card that allows its user access to discounts at over 100,000 participating merchants nationwide.

Users access the discounts through the use of the Samaritan Saver website, from which they can download and print coupons for local and national companies as well as shop online and receive instant savings. The actual wallet-size card is not necessary at the participating merchant, but the pre-printed coupons are.
