= Koofers =

Koofers, Inc.
- Company type: Private
- Website type: Social network service SaaS - Software as a service DaaS - Data as a service
- Headquarters: Reston, VA
- Key people: Glynn LoPresti (CEO); Michael Rihani (CPO); Patrick Gartlan (CTO); Dan Donahoe (Software Architect)
- Industry: Education
- Website: www.koofers.com
- Registration: Required
- Launched: Fall 2008
- Current status: Defunct

Koofers was a social media service for college students. It provided academic information sharing. College students had access to the service by creating an account with their e-mail address. Koofers was a private company, founded in 2008 and headquartered in Reston, VA (a part of the Washington, DC metropolitan area).

Koofers provided several services, and include interactive flashcards, course and instructor ratings, professors' grading histories, and an online library for sharing past exams and study materials.

In 2019, the company was acquired by Docsity.

== Company history ==
Koofers.com was created in 2006 by then Virginia Tech students Michael Rihani and Patrick Gartlan, along with Virginia Tech alumnus Glynn LoPresti. The term "koofer" is local slang for a past paper that is made available to students taking the course later, for use in studying or preparing. Rihani, Gartlan, and LoPresti's aim was to enable students to make class and teacher selection more transparent, by providing grading histories and professor reviews to help students shape their class schedules, based on their individual needs and learning styles.

in 2019 the Company was acquired by Italian entrepreneur Riccardo Ocleppo, and was merged with Docsity.

=== Progression ===
- May 2008 - Participated in Launchbox Digital's tech incubator Summer '08 program
- October 2008 - Was a top 25 recipient of the fbFund Developer Competition

== Features & Services ==
- Library of course materials - aggregates and organizes course materials.
- Professor ratings – offers a 5-star rating system in multiple categories
- Grade histories – collected from the universities, users can see the grading trends
- Flashcards – creation of virtual flashcards
- Schedule maker – students can digitally map out different options and plan their schedules.
- Question and answer forum
- Textbook center – aggregates prices offered for textbooks from several vendors
