= Bibliography of Sri Lanka =

The National Flag of Sri Lanka

This is a bibliography of works on Sri Lanka.

== Overviews ==
- Blaze, L. E (1995). History of Ceylon. Asian Educational Services. ISBN 978-81-206-1074-3.
- Blaze, L. E (1995). The Story of Lanka. Asian Educational Services. ISBN 978-81-206-1074-3.
- de Silva, K. M. (2005). A History of Sri Lanka. Colombo: Vijitha Yapa. p. 782. ISBN 955-8095-92-3.
- Ludowyk, E. F. C. (1985). The Story of Ceylon. Navrang Booksellers & Publishers. ISBN 978-81-7013-020-8.
- Mittal, J. P. (2006). "Other dynasties". History of Ancient India: From 4250 BC to 637 AD. Vol. 2 of History of Ancient India: A New Version. Atlantic Publishers & Distributors. ISBN 81-269-0616-2.
- Nicholas, C. W.; Paranavitana, S. (1961). A Concise History of Ceylon. Colombo University Press.
- Peebles, Patrick (2006). The History of Sri Lanka. Greenwood. ISBN 9780313332050.
- Seneviratna, Anuradha (1989). The Springs of Sinhala Civilization. Navrang Booksellers & Publishers. LCCN 89906331. OCLC 21524601.
- Siriweera, W. I. (2004). History of Sri Lanka. Dayawansa Jayakodi & Company. ISBN 978-955-551-257-2.
- Tinker, Hugh (1990). South Asia: A Short History. University of Hawaii Press. ISBN 0824812875.
- Yogasundaram, Nath (2008). A Comprehensive History of Sri Lanka. Vijitha Yapa Publishers. ISBN 978-955-665-002-0.
- Silva, K.M. de History of Sri Lanka (1982) complete text online free

== History ==
Primary sources

- Dhammakitti; tr. Geiger, Wilhelm; tr. Rickmers, C. Habel (1212). Culavamsa: Being the More Recent part of the Mahavamsa (1929 ed.). Colombo: Ceylon Govt. Information Dept.
- ed. & tr. Oldenberg, Hermann (1879). The Dîpavaṃsa, an Ancient Buddhist Historical Record. Williams and Norgate.
- ed. Gunasekara, B. (1900). The Rajavaliya : or, A historical narrative of Sinhalese kings from Vijaya to Vimala Dharma Surya II. Colombo: Government Printer, Ceylon. ISBN 81-206-1029-6. Archived from the original on 2018-04-20. ;
- Knox, Robert (1681). An Historical Relation of the Island Ceylon. London: Richard Chiswell.
- tr. Geiger, Wilhelm; Bode, Mabel Haynes (1912). Mahavamsa : the great chronicle of Ceylon. London: Oxford University Press.
- Moratuwagama, H. M. (1996). සිංහල ථුපවංසය—Sinhala Thupavansaya [Sinhala Thupavamsa] (in Sinhala). Rathna Publishers. ISBN 978-955-569-068-3.

=== By era ===
Tambapanni & Upatissa Nuwara period

- Mittal, J. P. (2006). "Other dynasties". History of Ancient India: From 4250 BC to 637 AD. Vol. 2 of History of Ancient India: A New Version. Atlantic Publishers & Distributors. ISBN 81-269-0616-2.

Anuradhapura period

- Bandaranayake, Senake (2007). Sigiriya. Central Cultural Fund. ISBN 978-955-613-111-6.
- Lokubandara, W. J. M. (2007). The Mistique of Sigiriya — Whispers of the Mirror Wall. Godage International Publishers. ISBN 978-955-30-0610-3.
- Mendis, Ranjan Chinthaka (1999). The Story of Anuradhapura. Lakshmi Mendis. ISBN 978-955-96704-0-7.
- Perera, Lakshman S. (2001). The Institutions of Ancient Ceylon from Inscriptions. Vol. 1. International Centre for Ethnic Studies. ISBN 978-955-580-055-6.
- Rambukwelle, P. B. (1993). Commentary on Sinhala Kingship — Vijaya to Kalinga Magha. Sridevi Printers. ISBN 978-955-95565-0-3.
- Siriweera, W. I. (2004). History of Sri Lanka. Dayawansa Jayakodi & Company. ISBN 978-955-551-257-2.
- Wijesooriya, S. (2006). A Concise Sinhala Mahavamsa. Participatory Development Forum. ISBN 978-955-9140-31-3.
- Paranavithana, Senarath (July 1936). "Two Royal Titles of the Early Sinhalese, and the Origin of Kingship in Ancient Ceylon". Journal of the Royal Asiatic Society of Great Britain and Ireland. 68 (3): 443–462. doi:10.1017/S0035869X0007725X. S2CID 161585769.

Polonnaruwa period

Jaffna period

- Abeysinghe, Tikiri (2005). Jaffna Under the Portuguese. Colombo: Stamford Lake. p. 66. ISBN 955-1131-70-1.
- De Queroz, Fernao (1992). The Temporal and Spiritual Conquest of Ceylon. New Delhi: Vedam Books. p. 1274. ISBN 81-206-0764-3.
- Gnanaprakasar, Swamy (2003). A Critical History of Jaffna. New Delhi: Asian Educational Services. p. 122. ISBN 81-206-1686-3.
- Kunarasa, K (2003). The Jaffna Dynasty. Johor Bahru: Dynasty of Jaffna King’s Historical Society. p. 122. ISBN 955-8455-00-8.
- Tambiah, H. W (2001). Laws and customs of Tamils of Jaffna (revised ed.). Colombo: Women’s Education & Research Centre. p. 259. ISBN 955-9261-16-9.

Dambadeniya period

Gampola period

Kotte period

- Siriweera, W. I. (1994). A Study of the Economic History of Pre Modern Sri Lanka. Vikas Publishing House. ISBN 978-0-7069-7621-2.
- da Silva, O. M. (1990). Fidalgos in the kingdom of Kotte, Sri Lanka, 1505-1656: the Portuguese in Sri Lanka. Colombo, Sri Lanka: Harwoods Publishers.
- Paul E. Peiris, Ceylon the Portuguese Era: Being a History of the Island for the Period, 1505–1658, Volume 2. Tisara Publishers: Sri Lanka, 1992. (Link). OCLC 12552979.

Sitawaka period

- Siriweera, W. I. (1994). A Study of the Economic History of Pre Modern Sri Lanka. Vikas Publishing House. ISBN 978-0-7069-7621-2.
- Paul E. Peiris, Ceylon the Portuguese Era: Being a History of the Island for the Period, 1505–1658, Volume 2. Tisara Publishers: Sri Lanka, 1992. (Link). OCLC 12552979.

Kandyan period

- Siriweera, W. I. (1994). A Study of the Economic History of Pre Modern Sri Lanka. Vikas Publishing House. ISBN 978-0-7069-7621-2.
- Paul E. Peiris, Ceylon the Portuguese Era: Being a History of the Island for the Period, 1505–1658, Volume 2. Tisara Publishers: Sri Lanka, 1992. (Link). OCLC 12552979.
- C. Gaston Perera, Kandy Fights the Portuguese – A Military History of Kandyan Resistance. Vijithayapa Publications: Sri Lanka, June 2007. ISBN 978-955-1266-77-6

British Ceylon

- Brohier, RL, The Golden Age of Military Adventure in Ceylon: an account of the Uva Rebellion 1817-1818. Colombo: 1933
- Malalgoda, Kitsiri (1976). Buddhism in Sinhalese Society, 1750–1900: A Study of Religious Revival and Change. U. of California Press. Archived from the original on 2016-03-04.
- Mills, Lennox A. (1933). Ceylon Under British Rule, 1795–1932. Oxford U.P. ISBN 9780714620190.
- Peebles, Patrick (2001). The Plantation Tamils of Ceylon. Continuum International. ISBN 9780718501549.
- Schrikker. Alicia (2007). Dutch and British Colonial Intervention in Sri Lanka, 1780–1815: Expansion and Reform. Leiden: Brill. ISBN 9789004156029.
- Spencer, Jonathan (1990). Sri Lanka: History and the Roots of Conflict. Psychology Press. ISBN 9780203407417.
- Wenzlhuemer, Roland (2008). From Coffee to Tea Cultivation in Ceylon, 1880–1900: An Economic and Social History. Leiden: Brill. ISBN 978-9004163614.
- Wickramasinghe, Nira (2006). Sri Lanka in the Modern Age: A History of Contested Indentities. University of Hawaii Press. ISBN 9780824830168.
- Muthiah, Wesley and Wanasinghe, Sydney, Britain, World War 2 and the Sama Samajists, Young Socialist Publication, Colombo, 1996
- Sivasundaram, Sujit. "Ethnicity, Indigeneity, and Migration in the Advent of British Rule to Sri Lanka," American Historical Review (2010) 115#2 pp 428–452. in JSTOR
- Wenzlhuemer, Roland. "Indian Labour Immigration and British Labour Policy in Nineteenth-Century Ceylon," Modern Asian Studies (2007) 41:575–602

1948–present

- Spencer, Jonathan (1990). Sri Lanka: History and the Roots of Conflict. Psychology Press. ISBN 9780203407417.
- Wickramasinghe, Nira (2006). Sri Lanka in the Modern Age: A History of Contested Indentities. University of Hawaii Press. ISBN 9780824830168.
- Crusz, Noel, The Cocos Islands Mutiny, Fremantle Arts Centre Press, Fremantle, WA, 2001

=== By topic ===
Monarchs

- Mendis, Vernon L. B. (2000). The Rulers of Sri Lanka. S. Godage & Brothers. ISBN 978-955-20-4847-0.

Portuguese Ceylon

- Abeysinghe, Tikiri (2005). Jaffna Under the Portuguese. Colombo: Stamford Lake. p. 66. ISBN 955-1131-70-1.
- De Queroz, Fernao (1992). The Temporal and Spiritual Conquest of Ceylon. New Delhi: Vedam Books. p. 1274. ISBN 81-206-0764-3.
- Winius, George D. (1971). The fatal history of Portuguese Ceylon; transition to Dutch rule. Cambridge, Massachusetts: Harvard University Press. ISBN 978-0-674-29510-0.
- Paul E. Peiris, Ceylon the Portuguese Era: Being a History of the Island for the Period, 1505–1658, Volume 2. Tisara Publishers: Sri Lanka, 1992. (Link). OCLC 12552979.
- S.G. Perera, A History of Ceylon For Schools – The Portuguese and Dutch period. The Associated Newspapers of Ceylon: Sri Lanka, 1942. (Link). OCLC 10531673.

Dutch Ceylon

- Schrikker. Alicia (2007). Dutch and British Colonial Intervention in Sri Lanka, 1780–1815: Expansion and Reform. Leiden: Brill. ISBN 9789004156029.
- Winius, George D. (1971). The fatal history of Portuguese Ceylon; transition to Dutch rule. Cambridge, Massachusetts: Harvard University Press. ISBN 978-0-674-29510-0.
- S.G. Perera, A History of Ceylon For Schools – The Portuguese and Dutch period. The Associated Newspapers of Ceylon: Sri Lanka, 1942. (Link). OCLC 10531673.

== Geography ==
- Sivasundaram, Sujit. "Tales of the Land: British Geography and Kandyan Resistance in Sri Lanka, c. 1803–1850," Modern Asian Studies (2007) 41#5 pp 925–965. in JSTOR

== Government & military ==
Government

Military

- Bansal, Alok, Mayilvaganan. M and Podder, Sukanya, Sri Lanka: Search for Peace. Manas Publications, New Delhi, 2007. ISBN 81-7049-340-4
- Brohier, RL, The Golden Age of Military Adventure in Ceylon: an account of the Uva Rebellion 1817-1818. Colombo: 1933
- Spencer, Jonathan (1990). Sri Lanka: History and the Roots of Conflict. Psychology Press. ISBN 9780203407417.
- Crusz, Noel, The Cocos Islands Mutiny, Fremantle Arts Centre Press, Fremantle, WA, 2001
- Dissanayaka, T.D.S.A.: War or Peace in Sri Lanka, Volume II. Swastika (Pvt.) Ltd., Colombo 1998.
- Hoole, R.; Somasundaram, D.; Sritharan, K.; Thiranagama, R. (1990). "The Broken Palmyra – The Tamil Crisis in Sri Lanka: An Inside Account". The Sri Lanka Studies Institute. Archived from the original on May 15, 2011.
- Indian intervention in Sri Lanka: The role of India's intelligence agencies. ISBN 955-95199-0-5/ ISBN 978-955-95199-0-4, South Asian Network on Conflict Research (1993), By Rohan Gunaratna.
- Johnson, Robert: A Region in Turmoil. Reaktion, New York and London 2005. (Covers Sri Lanka and its regional context.)
- Muthiah, Wesley and Wanasinghe, Sydney, Britain, World War 2 and the Sama Samajists, Young Socialist Publication, Colombo, 1996
- Narayan Swamy, M. R.: Tigers of Lanka: from Boys to Guerrillas. Konark Publishers; 3rd ed. 2002, ISBN 81-220-0631-0.
- Rajasinghan, K.T.: Sri Lanka: The Untold Story. 2001–2002. (Serialised in Asia Times Online).Sri Lanka: The Untold Story.
- War and Peace in Sri Lanka: With a Post-Accord Report From Jaffna. ISBN 955-26-0001-4 /ISBN 978-955-26-0001-2, Institute of Fundamental Studies, Sri Lanka; 1 edition (1 October 1987), By Rohan Gunaratna.

== Demographics ==
Religion

- Deegalle, Mahinda (ed.): Buddhism, Conflict and Violence in Modern Sri Lanka. Routledge, London, 2006, ISBN 0-415-35920-1.

== Economy ==
- Peebles, Patrick (2001). The Plantation Tamils of Ceylon. Continuum International. ISBN 9780718501549.
- Wenzlhuemer, Roland (2008). From Coffee to Tea Cultivation in Ceylon, 1880–1900: An Economic and Social History. Leiden: Brill. ISBN 978-9004163614.
- Codrington, H. W. (1994). Ceylon Coins and Currency. Asian Educational Services. ISBN 978-81-206-0913-6.
- Siriweera, W. I. (1994). A Study of the Economic History of Pre Modern Sri Lanka. Vikas Publishing House. ISBN 978-0-7069-7621-2.
- Wenzlhuemer, Roland. "Indian Labour Immigration and British Labour Policy in Nineteenth-Century Ceylon," Modern Asian Studies (2007) 41:575–602

== Culture ==
=== Art & architecture ===
- Basnayake, H. T. (1986). Sri Lankan Monastic Architecture. Sri Satguru Publications. ISBN 978-81-7030-009-0.
- Fernando, G. S. (2001). සිංහල සැරසිලි—Sinhala Sarasili [Sinhala Decorational Art] (in Sinhala). M. D. Gunasena and Company. ISBN 978-955-21-0525-8.

=== Science & technology ===
- Gooneratne, W.; Hirashima, S. (1990). Irrigation and Water Management in Asia. Sterling Publishers.

== Society ==
- Arsecularatne, S. N, Sinhalese immigrants in Malaysia & Singapore, 1860–1990: History through recollections, Colombo, KVG de Silva & Sons, 1991
- Balasingham, Adele: The Will to Freedom – An Inside View of Tamil Resistance. Fairmax Publishing Ltd, 2nd ed. 2003, ISBN 1-903679-03-6.
- Malalgoda, Kitsiri (1976). Buddhism in Sinhalese Society, 1750–1900: A Study of Religious Revival and Change. U. of California Press. Archived from the original on 2016-03-04.
- Peebles, Patrick (2001). The Plantation Tamils of Ceylon. Continuum International. ISBN 9780718501549.
- Ellawala, H. (1969). Social History of Early Ceylon. Department of Cultural Affairs.
- Deegalle, Mahinda (ed.): Buddhism, Conflict and Violence in Modern Sri Lanka. Routledge, London, 2006, ISBN 0-415-35920-1.
- Gamage, S. and Watson, I.B.: Conflict and Community in Contemporary Sri Lanka. Sage, New Delhi 1999.
- Gamage, S.: Ethnic Conflict, State Reform and Nation Building in Sri Lanka: Analysis of the Context and Suggestions for a Settlement, in: Neelsen, John P. and Malik, Dipak: "Crises of State and Nation: South Asian States between Nation Building and Fragmentation", Manohar, New Delhi (forthcoming).
- Wenzlhuemer, Roland. "Indian Labour Immigration and British Labour Policy in Nineteenth-Century Ceylon," Modern Asian Studies (2007) 41:575–602

== See also ==
- Outline of Sri Lanka
- Lists of books
- List of bibliographies
  - List of academic databases and search engines
  - List of digital library projects
  - List of scientific journals
  - List of digital library projects
  - List of online databases
  - List of online encyclopedias
  - List of educational video websites
