= Wasley =

Wasley is a surname. Notable people include:

- André Wasley (1899–1978), French actor
- James Wasley (born 1979), Australian rules footballer
- Jay Wasley, star of Ghost Adventures
- Laura Wasley (born 1984), Manx cyclist
- Mark Wasley (born 1965), Australian cricketer
- Michael Wasley (born 1990), British snooker player
- Patricia Wasley, educator
