= WRA =

WRA can refer to:

== Organisations ==
- War Relocation Authority, a WWII US internment agency
- Water Resources Agency, Taiwan
- White Ribbon Association (formerly British Women's Temperance Association)
- World Road Association, an international forum
- Wildrose Alliance, a political party in Alberta, Canada

== Places in the United States ==
- Western Reserve Academy, a private school in Ohio
- Worcester Regional Airport, Massachusetts
