= Theatre pedagogy =

Discipline combining both theatre and pedagogy

Theatre pedagogy (German: Theaterpädagogik) is an independent discipline combining both theatre and pedagogy. As a field that arose during the 20th century, theatre pedagogy has developed separately from drama education, the distinction being that the drama teacher typically teaches method, theory and/or practice of performance alone, while theatre pedagogy integrates both art and education to develop language and strengthen social awareness. Theatre pedagogy is rooted in drama and stagecraft, yet works to educate people outside the realm of theatre itself.

== Description ==
The primary purpose of theatre pedagogy is to bring about change in understanding the world around us. In achieving this objective, several other skills are taught and learned. These include:

- Developing language, including non-verbal and non-written language.
- Honing drama skills and a theatrical vocabulary.
- Use of collective action to overcome problems in the community.

Theatre pedagogy enhances these forms of communication to facilitate human interaction, helping participants to learn about themselves, their peers, and their surrounding world. Rooted both in traditional education and amateur theater, the field of theatre pedagogy has grown to span many sectors, including:

- Use of drama in the social sphere, such as work in prisons, with people in recovery, as violence prevention, etc.
- Theatrical collaboration between laypeople and actors.
- As education, both in ordinary schools and in the theatre.
- In medical education improving communication between faculty and students and between physicians and patients.

== See also ==
- Pedagogy of the Oppressed
- Performance studies
- Social pedagogy
- Theatre of the Oppressed
