= The Do Book Company =

British publishing house

- Founded: 2013
- Country of origin: United Kingdom
- Headquarters location: Shoreditch, London
- Distribution: Grantham Book Services (UK); Ingram Content Group (USA); Perimeter Distribution (Australia); Basheer Graphic Books (Southeast Asia)
- Key people: Miranda West, Director
- Publication types: Books
- Official website: www.thedobook.co

The Do Book Company is an independent publishing house based in London, England. They publish books by speakers from the Do Lectures and are represented by Publishers Group UK.

== History ==
The Do Book Company was founded in May 2013 by Miranda West, their offices are based in Shoreditch, London. They are partnered with Do Lectures and publish authors who have spoken at the event. Since founding they have published five books, and have successfully crowdfunded Do Purpose by David Hieatt, through Unbound.
