= Christianity.com =

Christian website

- The October 9, 2007 Homepage of Christianity.com
- Website type: Christian
- Available in: English
- Owner: Salem Web Network
- Creator: Salem Web Network
- Website: christianity.com
- Commercial: Yes
- Registration: Optional
- Launched: February 2005
- Current status: Active

Christianity.com is a site owned and operated by Salem Web Network and headquartered in Richmond, Virginia. The stated focus of Christianity.com is "to provide accessible, trustworthy, and theologically sound content that helps people know God, grow in faith and spiritual maturity, and live biblically faithful lives." Pastors, authors, and speakers such as John F. MacArthur, Adrian Rogers, Kay Arthur, Chuck Swindoll, Hank Hanegraaff, and John Piper contribute to the site.

== History ==
In 1999, Christianity.com was headquartered in Silicon Valley, California. Spencer Jones from Christian Broadcasting Network (who invested $10 million in the startup) and David Davenport, who was head of Pepperdine University for 10 years, was COO and CEO. Other funding and credit partners were Sequoia Capital, which invested $10 million, and Comdisco Ventures Group, which loaned $10 million for equipment and services. In the middle of the dotcom bust, the company went bankrupt and on December 18, 2001, the domain name was purchased by Renewal Enterprises, LLC.

Salem Web Network announced the acquisition of Christianity.com from Renewal Enterprises on February 11, 2005 for approximately $3.4 million.

== Biblestudytools.com ==
Christianity.com's sister site, Biblestudytools.com, is an online platform providing digital resources for Bible study, biblical education, and theological research.

=== BibleStudyTools.com History ===
The website was launched in the late 1990s with the primary aim was to digitize public domain biblical commentaries and concordances to make them accessible to laypeople, students, and pastors. In the early 2000s, the site was acquired by Salem Web Network, which expanded the site’s library through partnerships with various Bible publishers and theological seminaries. On 03/24/2026, the site began to require users to agree to pay for God's word. "We understand. You're not here for the ads. But here's the thing. Ads help us keep the lights on and pay our staff to provide the Christian content you enjoy. We kindly ask that you click below to restore ads on our site, we'd appreciate it!"
