= Conference of European Directors of Roads =

Organisation of European national road administrations

The Conference of European Directors of Roads (CEDR) or Conférence Européenne des Directeurs des Routes (in French) was created in 2003 from the former Western European Road Directors (WERD). It is a non-profit organisation established as a platform for the Directors of National Road Authorities. Having a European focus, CEDR complements the work of the World Road Association PIARC and other regional associations of road authorities. CEDR's activities are carried out in an open and transparent way in accordance with CEDR's own code of conduct and the code of conduct of the EU institutions. CEDR's is listed in the EU Transparency Register, 485630615462–79.

== Mission ==
CEDR is an organisation of European national road administrations that promotes Excellence in the Management of Roads.

== Strategic goals ==
The Strategic Goals of CEDR agreed at its Warsaw Governing Board meeting of April 2016 are; – Help NRAs to keep ahead of the curve, anticipate future trends and prepare them to face new challenges – Reinforce NRAs role as key providers of efficient and seamless mobility from an end user perspective within the transport system – Facilitate and optimise the efficient use of resources, making the best use of existing infrastructures. – Improve the safety and sustainability of roads, and reduce their environmental impact and carbon footprint.

== Relations ==
CEDR has established MoUs with the World Road Association - PIARC and the European Rail Infrastructure Managers.. In 2022, CEDR agreed to cooperate more closely with the automative sector with an MoU with [EUCAR].

In the field of cooperative ITS (C-ITS), CEDR also signed a collaboration with the motorway concessionaires association ASECAP, the cities network in transport POLIS and the Car 2 Car Communication Consortium to form the Amsterdam Group as a strategic alliance to facilitate joint deployment of cooperative ITS in Europe.

== Research ==
In 2004, CEDR agreed to support the launch of the Transport Research Arena. This continues to be the main focus of CEDR's innovation outreach activities.

Since 2008, the CEDR Transnational Research Programme (TRP) has operated through a series of annual transnational calls on topics that address the needs of European road authorities. The programme was initially started with support from the Directorate-General for Research and Innovation (European Commission) under the title ERA-NET ROAD. The aim is to produce research results that can implemented by CEDR members and contribute to a safe, sustainable and efficient road network across Europe. It is funded by CEDR members on a voluntary basis. The latest programmes addressed (in 2015) Climate Change, Multimodality – user needs/freight and logistics, and BIM and (in 2016) Safety, Water quality and Biodiversity and invasive species

The results of CEDR's research programme have been adopted at a national and European level. The European Climate Adaptation Platform references the climate adaptation activities and joint activities with US and others. In the field of Intelligent Transport Systems, CEDR has played a large role in European implementation. Chaired by CEDR, the Amsterdam Group is a co-operation between toll road operators (represented by ASECAP), cities (represented by POLIS), the service providers (represented by the Car2Car consortium) and road authorities (represented by CEDR). Furthering the application of truck platooning through the EU Truck Platooning Challenge during the Dutch Presidency of the European Union was an activity that arose from the 2014 Informal Meeting of EU transport ministers.

In 2013, CEDR's co-operation with the Directorate-General for Research and Innovation (European Commission) and US Federal Highway Administration resulted in a joint research programme on Infrastructure Innovation.

In 2016, CEDR and the Directorate-General for Mobility and Transport (European Commission) agreed to twin research on selected topics.

== Members ==
Members include:

- Austria, Bundesministerium für Verkehr, Innovation und Technologie (BMViT) or Federal Ministry for Transport, Innovation & Technology
- Belgium-Flanders, Agency for Roads and Traffic
- Belgium Wallonia General Direction of Roads and Buildings
- Bulgaria, Road Infrastructure Agency
- Cyprus, Public Works Department Ministry of Transport, Communications and Works
- Czech Republic, Road and Motorway Directorate of the Czech Republic
- Denmark, Vejdirektoratet or Danish Road Directorate
- Estonia, Estonian Transport Administration
- Finland, Finnish Transport Agency
- Germany, Bundesministerium für Verkehr und digitale Infrastruktur
- Greece, Hellenic Ministry of Infrastructure, Transports and Networks
- Hungary, Hungarian Public Road Nonprofit Company
- Iceland, Icelandic Road Administration
- Ireland, Transport Infrastructure Ireland
- Italy, ANAS SpA-Direzione Generale
- Latvia, Latvian State Roads
- Liechtenstein, National Roads Office/Amt fur Strassenverkher
- Lithuania, Lithuanian Road Administration
- Luxembourg, Administration des Ponts et Chaussées
- Malta, Transport Malta
- Netherlands, Rijkswaterstaat
- Norway, Norwegian Public Roads Administration
- Poland, General Directorate for National Roads and Highways or Generalna Dyrekcja Dróg Krajowych i Autostrad (GDDKiA)
- Portugal, Instituto da Mobilidade e dos Transportes, I.P. (IMT)
- Slovenia, Slovenian Infrastructure Agency
- Spain, Ministerio de Fomento
- Sweden, Trafikverket
- Switzerland, Office Fédéral des Routes
- United Kingdom National Highways
- Ukraine (since November, 2022)

== See also ==
- World Road Association
- Regional associations of road authorities
