= Godtube =

Christian online video sharing platform

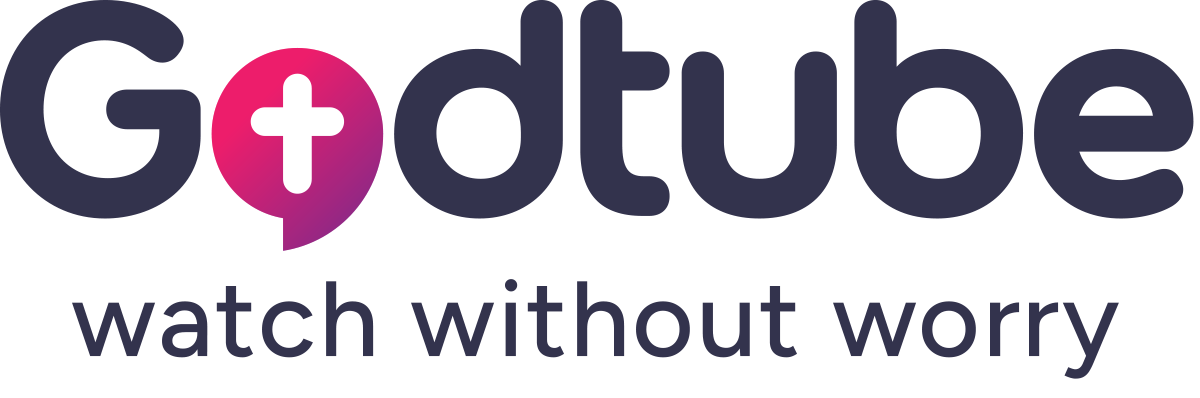
- Company type: Video hosting service
- Founded: Spring of 2007
- Owner: Salem Web Network
- Website: godtube.com
- Current status: Active

Godtube is an online video platform which provides Christian video content. It is owned by Salem Web Network, the internet division of Salem Media Group. Godtube includes music videos, comedy, children, animals, sports, news and inspirational clips.

== History ==
Godtube was launched in the spring of 2007 by founders Christopher Wyatt, Jason Martell, Lloyd Chartrand, and Mike Miller (former Executive Pastor of First Baptist Dallas). Wyatt was once an online student at Dallas Theological Seminary and was also one of CBS's producers for the 1995 Day and Date show.

According to comScore, Godtube was the fastest growing US website for the month of August 2007. According to Quantcast, total monthly site traffic lost 75% of its users, from 2.7 million, to just over 690 thousand by February 2009. In February 2008, the company raised $30,000,000 from GLG Partners, LP, at a valuation of $150,000,000 after 5 months of operation.

In February 2009, Godtube re-launched as Tangle, expanding into a social network. Tangle also included other new features, such as an online Bible and an "interactive prayer wall", and encouraged non-Christians and atheists to participate and share their points of view. By April 2010, Godtube returned as a separate site alongside Tangle.

In May 2010, Salem Communications' Salem Web Network division acquired Godtube and Tangle's parent company Big Jump Media.

On December 1, 2010, Tangle was discontinued. As part of the transition, certain functionality was pointed towards other sites in the Salem network, and videos were migrated back to Godtube accounts.

In May 2019, Godtube unveiled a new logo.

== Features ==
=== Video technology ===
Videos can also be watched with the Godtube app on Android 4.1 or newer and iOS 7 or newer. The app was last updated in September 2016 for both platforms.

Godtube manually reviews every video uploaded to its site.

In some cases, Godtube embeds third-party videos (from sites like YouTube, Facebook and Rumble) instead of hosting them. Some Godtube features, such as view count and favorites, are still available with these embedded videos.

=== Music ===
Godtube has a dedicated music section with traditional and contemporary Christian music. It has similarities to YouTube Music and its predecessor Vevo. Godtube's artist directory consists of licensed music channels, with 387 entries as of May 2019. Entries consist of artists and record labels.

Godtube has premiered BarlowGirl's "Sing Me a Love Song" music video and COLMANblue's "Hey (Not Worth the Worry) single.

== Demographics ==
According to a November 2010 Quantcast assessment, the Godtube audience is 60% female and 40% male, with a high percentage of teenagers and baby boomers. Users are widely middle class.

According to Quantcast, there are higher percentages of teenagers, African Americans, college graduates, and middle-class people using Godtube.

== Investors ==
Although it was reported in the trade press in May 2008 that they had received $30,000,000 in funding from GLG Partners, former Big Jump Media CEO Jason Illian was quoted by The Dallas Morning News as saying the investment was "actually around $17,000,000".

According to Forbes, GLG's funds under management were deflated 40% after their foray into Godtube. The founders of the hedge fund agreed to surrender their salaries in lieu of a $1 per year probationary stipend.

KMA Direct Communications was a primary investor in the privately held web site.
