= Social learning tools =

Tools used for pedagogical and andragogical purposes

Social learning tools are tools used for pedagogical and ragogical purposes that utilize social software and/or social media in order to facilitate learning through interactions between individuals and systems. The idea of setting up "social learning tools" is to make education more convenient and widespread. It also allows an interaction between users and/or the software which can bring a different aspect to learning. People can acquire knowledge by distance learning tools, for instance, Facebook, Twitter, Khan Academy and so on. Social learning tools may mediate in formal or informal learning environments to help create connections between learners, instructors and information. These connections form dynamic knowledge networks. Social learning tools are used in schools for teaching/learning and in businesses for training. Within a school environment, the use of social learning tools can affect not only the user (student) but his/her caretaker as well as his/her instructor. It brings a different approach to the traditional way of learning which affects the student and his/her support circle. Companies also use social learning tools. They use them to improve knowledge transfer within departments and across teams. Businesses use a variety of these tools to create a social learning environment. They are also used in company settings to help improve team work, problem solving, and performance in stressful situations.

Social learning tools are used for people who are willing to share their good ideas/thoughts with someone else. The ideas can be related to either the academic studies or any other daily skills that we want to share with others. Social learning tools connect learning to our daily lives. It creates a learning environment more truthful to today's society. There are a couple of common elements that should be present in a social learning tool. Technology should be involved to allow physical and cognitive learning. There should be interactions between the people who use the tool and interactions with the software. Another element is trust. Users should trust the software and what other people have created.

== Frequently used social learning tools ==
=== Blogger ===
Blogger logo

Blogger is a site in which users can create their own blog. Blogger can be used in an educational context. A teacher could create a blog in which students could interact on. This would allow students to improve their writing and planning skills. Students would have to think about how they would write their information on the blog in order to convey their message properly. Blogger provides opportunities for students to share what they wrote with their peers and with their caretakers. The blogs could also be a form of electronic portfolios that could show what the students created during the school year. Blogger has settings in which only people with permission can see or write on the blogs themselves.

=== Facebook ===
Facebook logo

Facebook is an online communication tool that allows individuals to interact with each other within a virtual community. It has become the most popular social networking site since its beginnings in 2004. Facebook was co-founded in 2004 by Mark Zuckerberg with his roommates and colleagues from Harvard University. Zuckerberg is presently the CEO of Facebook. This online communication tool can be used for personal and for professional purposes. Technology plays an integral part of students' daily lives and teachers will need to find ways of implementing these technologies into their classrooms. Research is currently being conducted on the benefits of implementing Facebook in educational settings and how it could potentially be used as a tool for teaching and learning, even if it is known for social networking in the first place. For example, Facebook can be used to create discussion groups for group projects to divide the work and stay up to date with each other. It can also be used to share articles. Educators can also create professional Facebook accounts for their classrooms, which could be potentially used as a dashboard to upload course material and assignments. It can also be used to create polls to get some feedback and suggestions on the course that the teacher would like to implement. The objective is to improve the methods of teaching as well as the learning experience of students. With the use of technologies, students are more engaged in their learning.

=== Google Hangouts ===
Google Hangouts logo

Instagram logo

Google Hangouts is a communication software platform that was created by Google. Some features of this social learning tool include starting a chat conversation or video call, phone calls through Wi-Fi or data, and sending messages. All you need is a Google Account. Google Hangouts has become an increasingly popular tool to participate and communicate with people around the world. It can be seen as a better version of Skype in the sense that it has the potential to record or have a group chat without the occasional availability issues that may be seen in the free version of Skype. This makes it easily accessible and efficient in many ways. There are also many other useful tools from Google like Google Drive that allow users to take part in editing and sharing different content, assignments, and sources even when not together. It only takes an Internet connection and everything is saved in your own personal drive.

=== Instagram ===
Instagram, founded in 2010, is a social networking app that was created for sharing photos and videos. Used very frequently in today's society, Instagram can be seen as a great social learning tool through reaching the majority of the populations that have access to the Internet. It has become one of the most popular apps in the social networking world and is now used as a way to campaign companies or organizations. It may be used for educational purposes by posting photos or 1-minute videos of information or subject content. It may also be used for photo essays or creating an organization or lesson.

=== Khan Academy ===
Khan Academy logo

Khan Academy, founded in 2006 by Salman “Sal” Khan, is a non-profit organization providing free online educational resources used by millions of people worldwide. It is best known for its strong mathematics content provided through video tutorials. The mathematics content is designed to help students from kindergarten to grade 12. In 2009, Khan Academy began expanding its educational learning platform to include other subjects, including art history and computer science. The mathematics section is also much more accessible since its recent translation into French. Khan Academy has also diverged to offering other means of learning beyond the online videos, including self-paced training exercises, quizzes, and dashboards for teachers to keep track of student progress. There is also the coach resource section which provides guidelines to parents or teachers for example, who want to learn how to use Khan Academy.

Khan Academy is used in majority by individuals outside of school for study purposes. However, in recent years, its use in educational settings has been increasing. Some teachers have implemented the use of Khan Academy in their classrooms, believing it would simply be an adjunct to their instruction. However, it became more important than this. Some teachers are now thinking of “flipping” the normal functioning of classroom settings and including video tutorials from Khan Academy in their teaching. The idea is to have students watch the videos or read the lectures provided by the teacher at home and to do the problem sets during class time. It has been shown that students are having the most difficulty when they are doing their homework.

=== Pinterest ===
Pinterest logo

Pinterest is a web-based software platform that allows its users to share and discover new information through the use of pictures, descriptions, and short videos. It can also be seen as an online pin board where users can post on their board, collect from other boards, and privately share posted pins. This can be useful in the classroom through having students post their works on their own board or a class board and to share (re-pin) information between their peers. It is easily accessible and is popular for its application that can be used on any mobile or smart device.

=== Skype ===
Skype logo

Skype is a free telecommunications tool that gives its users the opportunity to voice chat or video call between various devices such as laptops and cellphones. Although this application requires the Internet, it has grown to be one of the world's most popular communication tools. Skype is an excellent resource to use when collaborating with participants who are in remote areas because discussions and communication can still occur. Skype can be applied to classrooms in many ways. For example, it can be used as a way to include students who are at home due to illness into collaborative discussions held in class.

=== Twitter ===
Twitter logo

Twitter is an established micro-blogging service available to individuals with Internet access world-wide and provides unlimited access to social networks for its users, to send and receive messages. In 2006, it was funded by Jack Dorsey, Noah Glass, Biz Stone, and Evan Williams. One of the common site users is media outlets to broadcast current news updates. For this reason, people use Twitter as a daily source of information to inform themselves on local and world news. Another way that Twitter is utilized, is in the classroom, when a teacher builds a classroom account which can be viewed by their students. This account would allow teachers to post reminders for test revisions, assignment due dates, upcoming field trips and conferences, and review post lessons and answer homework questions. For future lesson plans, teachers could have students tweet what they learned from the previous class and reflect on the content and then engage in classroom discussions on Twitter.

=== YouTube ===
YouTube logo

YouTube is a video-sharing website founded in 2005 that was created for users to share, like, upload, and comment on videos. Nowadays, YouTube can be used on many devices through applications like its YouTube app. Although it is mainly used for music, videos on reviewing items or how to do something, it may also be used for educational purposes. There are many accounts just for specific educational subjects like Crash Course, an account that focuses on subjects like anatomy, biology, chemistry and physics. YouTube can be a great social learning tool in education in many different ways: showing videos on different subjects in class or having students research how something works to answer questions, for homework or even to seek further knowledge. There are many platforms of YouTube that lead to other useful social learning tools for educational purposes. TED Talks created its account on YouTube, which provides videos of the best ideas from trusted voices discussing different issues, sharing knowledge or facts and opinions, sharing poetry and spoken word. For education, TED has created its own platform called TED-Ed, which is essentially short TED Talks videos that may be used for information or insight purposes on many different school subjects. There is even such thing as TeacherTube, which is another type of social learning tool similar to YouTube though initially created for education teachers. It may be used for teachers, students or parents through the use of published educational videos with a library of different content filled with videos, audio and pictures.

== Types of Environments ==
The different environments in which social learning tools can be used may influence the connections between learners, educators and the knowledge or information being acquired. These environments can be formal, non-formal, informal or virtual.

- Formal learning, is the planned process of acquiring knowledge that happens within a structured educational or institute setting. Lecturers in the university setting may use Moodle to post class lectures and the latest information to students, e.g. courseware used during lectures, coursework, quizzes, and forums. Students can both prepare and review for lectures based on what professors have posted at any given time.
- Non-formal learning, is the planned process learning that is voluntary and not in a structured environment. Most of planned learning that is not directly associated with school or the education system is done in a non-formal learning environment. For example, taking swimming lessons at the town pool. The swimming lessons take place in an unstructured environment though are planned, organized, and taught by an instructor of prior knowledge on the subject. Social learning tools can be used in this particular environment to facilitate learning like showing a video on YouTube on how to swim.
- Informal learning, is when information is gained inadvertently or unstructured, which usually happens on a day-to-day basis. Informal learning happens outside of the formal classroom during conversations among people, through exploration and personal experiences. Many circumstances can be considered to be part of an informal learning environment, e.g. the casual watching of videos on Instagram, Facebook or YouTube feed.
- Virtual learning, is when learning is done via the use of web-based platforms in and out of school. This learning environment is almost always used for any social learning tool. The virtual learning environment (VLE) encourages students to explore, discover and exchange information quickly, creatively and independently.

There are many social learning tools created for the sole purpose of education. The education system has adopted technology as a way to educate students in school and outside of school settings, where students have shown to work well in the VLE. Social learning tools including Moodle, Khan Academy, TED-Ed and TeacherTube can all be used both in school and at home through the use of the Internet. This goes to show that social learning tools can be both used within all learning environments while being used for educational purposes. However, it is important for these social learning tools to first be introduced in the formal learning environment, e.g. in the classroom, in order to be established as first an educational tool and second a social media platform that may be accessible outside of school.

The majority of informal learning environments are directly related to the use of social media, e.g. Facebook, Instagram, Twitter, Television Channels and so on. For instance, there are many Food TV or YouTube Channels that allow people to self-teach themselves how to cook. This is done through the informal and VLE where a person can simply learn from the comfort of their own home and according to their own pace. Not only does social software or media allow society to gain new knowledge or information; it is easily accessible and can even happen without the desire or intent of learning.

== Effectiveness: Education and Business ==
- The student/employee learning experience is expanded and advanced through the usage of technology.

=== Convenience ===
Social learning tools are convenient because through the various platforms that are now available, communication between students and teachers is fluid and the exchange of knowledge and ideas can be achieved remotely. This means that both parties are no longer required to travel in order to attend school and to study content based subjects. Students can communicate with their teachers over the Internet and attend and actively participate in lectures. Social learning tools provide both students and teachers with a media platform that enables distance education.

=== Cost-Efficient ===
Social learning tools give access, as a hub, to sources of information and resources online, either for free or at low costs through the use of the Internet. Most of these tools can easily be downloaded and used on a smartphone, tablet or computer. For example, there are online applications (apps) like EasyBib, which generates bibliographic citations in the necessary styles as needed for research, essays and other assignments and does this at no cost.

=== School-Wide Application ===
Social learning tools are applicable to elementary, high school, CEGEP, and university level learning. The social media platforms such as Facebook, Skype or Twitter could enhance the communication and interaction between students and their teachers. For example, teachers could post assignments, schedules, lesson summaries or notices regarding class updates for the students to view. For professional development, it provides teachers with the networking to connect with other professionals, share lesson plans, and receive up to date research regarding how education is taught.

Additionally, students could post their questions online for the teacher to answer in the group section, have class discussions and exchange ideas, and incorporate other forms of communication. As well, enable students to find real world applications and associate it with their topic. The platforms mentioned above, allow students to look beyond the classroom for answers to questions and to obtain outside input.

=== Learning Tools ===
Social networking permits students to research and gather information on topics beyond the classroom setting. For example, Twitter is one of the social learning tools implemented into classrooms for language learning. Tweets are a method of improving short essays and supports grammatically correct writing and reading skills of a language. It is a form of active learning which further engages the students. After posting a tweet, students would get feedback from other site users and have a second opinion on their writing piece. Another advantage would be to use Twitter in large lecture halls, so students could engage in the topic of discussion and share their interests and thoughts with their colleagues and professors in an ongoing basis.

=== Commercial Advantages ===
There are several advantages to the field of commerce, when it comes to implementing social learning tools in the workplace. If businesses create a forum for customers to write their feedbacks, they could have more ideas about how to improve their products, which enables the company to create better marketing strategies. Furthermore, employees could use the Internet or other program systems, in order to work from home. They could be informed about the current issues and concerns of the workplace. It allows people to concentrate without any distractions at the office, it offers the flexibility of scheduling, time engagement and committing.

=== Employment Opportunities ===
Social media platforms has made searching for job employment and connecting with potential employers more available for students entering the workforce for both part-time and full-time work. For example, Facebook and Twitter can be utilized to follow the companies’ postings and what is going on in the field.

LinkedIn is a website designed for students or other individuals to create professional profiles, post their curriculum vitae, receive current notifications on available employment and network with companies, businesses, school boards and industries to apply for a wider variety of job offers.

== Drawbacks in a Classroom Setting ==
=== Inappropriate or Offensive Use ===
A major concern among educators regarding social learning tools is the lack of control and monitoring. When students are given access to the Internet, they may post inappropriate content or use these sites in a way that can be disrespectful or damaging to others. Educators do not always have the means to be able to monitor every student's usage of these social learning tools, therefore students may be able to take advantage of this privilege for their own personal benefit and amusement. Posting pornography or using foul language are just a few examples that highlight the offensive and inappropriate behaviour that can be exhibited by students through social learning tools in classrooms.

=== Distraction From Learning ===
Social learning tools give students access to the Internet, where they can take advantage of other irrelevant websites and interfaces. It is very easy for students to get distracted by other social platforms that can divert their attention away from information being presented in class. This ultimately results in a disruption to the student's learning process which is a common concern for the majority of faculty members. Some research has shown that disruption to the learning process can significantly affect a student's ability to retain information into their long-term memory. Educators should be made aware of the potential risk for technology to be a distraction and set clear guidelines for their students to follow.

=== Cyberbullying ===
As the use of technology increases, cyberbullying is becoming more prevalent among students. Although social learning tools give students the ability to interact with teachers and peers, it also provides them with the opportunity to bully others online. This type of malicious behaviour can be seen at every level of education, including college campuses. Educators should plan to intervene on any incidents of cyberbullying that they witness in order to prevent more serious offences. They should also encourage respectful and positive behaviours towards peers when in the classroom and online.

=== Lack of Face-to-Face Communication ===
There is much speculation about whether or not social learning tools can provide enough opportunity for the development of real-life social skills. Some educators are concerned that students will not fully develop the ability to communicate effectively or command attention if they are constantly learning through a screen. Although social learning tools create opportunities for students to interact with others via web interfaces, it does not offer them authentic real-life interactions where students are forced to express themselves verbally or connect with others face-to-face.

=== Protection of Students’ Privacy ===
Social learning tools such as Facebook and Twitter are online networking websites that are public and can be accessed by anyone. Parents and educators alike have expressed their concerns about students using these platforms, as they could expose students’ identities. Protecting students’ personal privacy should be a top priority for educators, however this can be a challenge when using social learning tools. To prevent these issues from arising, schools should develop a system which ensures that students stay anonymous when posting content online.

=== Stress for Teachers ===
Social learning tools give students the ability to communicate efficiently with teachers outside of regular classroom hours. Although this may be a benefit to student learning, excessive stress is placed on teachers to respond quickly and provide feedback. Many faculty members have expressed that technology has harmed their work environment, as digital communication increases their stress levels. Furthermore, they have reported that digital communication has increased the number of hours they work in a day. Educators can also experience added pressure to learn how to teach with social learning tools. Many teachers are skilled with using technology, however they do not possess the knowledge on how to implement social learning tools in teaching. Educators need to be taught how and when to use technology, so they can effectively implement it within their curriculum.

=== Plagiarism and Student Integrity ===
Academic integrity is an important part of learning in all educational settings. Plagiarism is a concern for teachers that can be amplified when students are using social learning tools. The Internet is a database that holds a multitude of resources available to online users. Unfortunately, direct access to all of this information when using social learning tools makes it easy for students to copy the work of others and use it as their own.

=== Cost of Equipment ===
Social learning tools would not exist without the technological devices that harbor them. In order to implement social learning tools into the classroom, the school or school board must invest a large sum of money in order to purchase technological devices for its students. Depending on the budget available, there may not be enough money to buy devices for every student to use. Furthermore, personal cell phones are a popular device that can be used as a vehicle for teaching using social learning tools. However, not every student has the money to buy a cell phone.

== See also ==
- Learning Tools Interoperability
- Social Learning (Social Pedagogy)
- Social Learning Theory
- Social Networking Site (SNS)
