= Tom Freiling =

American author and publisher (born 1966)

- Born: May 6, 1966 (age 60); Minneapolis, Minnesota, U.S.
- Education: Oral Roberts University
- Occupations: Author, publisher
- Known for: Founder and CEO of Freiling Publishing, founder of Xulon Press
- Notable work: Walking with Lincoln: Spiritual Strength from America's Favorite President (2009), Reagan's God and Country (2000)

Tom Freiling (born May 6, 1966, in Minneapolis, Minnesota) is an American author and publisher of books on business, faith, culture, and health. Freiling is the CEO of Freiling Publishing and the founder of Xulon Press, acquired by NASDAQ publishing group Salem Communications in 2006. He sits on Forbes Business Council, the executive board at Fast Company and is a contributing writer at Entrepreneur.

== Authorial career ==
In 2000 Freiling released the book Reagan's God and Country (Gospel Light), that was endorsed by the former U.S. Attorney General, John Ashcroft. It was described as “must reading for everyone interested in our nation’s past” by Dr. Jerry Falwell. The book has been placed in the Ronald Reagan Presidential Library and Museum. 2002 saw the publication of Abraham Lincoln's Daily Treasure (Revell), a daily commentary of the president's life and faith alongside the actual devotional he is purported to have used during his presidency. Freiling released a best-selling book George W. Bush on God and Country (Allegiance Press) in 2004 and the collection of spiritual principles from the life of Lincoln, Walking with Lincoln (Revell), in 2009.

In 2004 Charles Sellier's Grizzly Adams Productions used George W. Bush on God and Country, along with David Aikman's book A Man of Faith, as the bases for his award-winning television documentary George W. Bush: Faith in the White House. The film was awarded three ICVMA awards and selected for Crown Awards. It also became a part of the President Bush permanent collection at the Smithsonian Institution.

== Publishing career ==
From 1993 to 1998, Freiling was the publisher of Creation House, part of Charisma Media (formerly Strang Communications).

From 1998 to 2002 Freiling was the managing director of Eagle Publishing, Inc., and in 2000 founded the Christian e-publishing firm Xulon Press in Vienna, VA.

In 2001, Freiling appeared on C-SPAN to discuss the book Mission Impeachable: The House Managers and the Historic Impeachment of President Clinton, published by his company, Allegiance Press, which he started in 2003. The same year, Allegiance Press published Thunder on the Left by Gary Aldrich and The Bush Boom written by Jerry Bowyer with a foreword by Larry Kudlow. In 2004, Freiling published Pay to the Order of Puerto Rico with Allegiance Press. The book was written by Alexander Odishelidze and Arthur B. Laffer, who was a member of Reagan's Economic Policy Advisory Board.

In 2004, Xulon Press published When Prisoners Return by Pat Nolan, which was released by The Prison Fellowship and included a foreword by Chuck Colson. The book was discussed during official Hearings at the United States Senate Committee on the Judiciary of 2009.

In 2023, Freiling Agency published “Choose Your Battles” by a retired U.S. Army Colonel, Irene Glaeser, a book called “an ideal companion” to a NY Times best-selling book Make Your Bed by William H. McRaven.

Freiling has represented, and published NY Times best-selling authors, including Hugh Hewitt, Michael Brown, Mark Batterson, Dan Peek, David Barton and Henry Blackaby. His articles have appeared in Forbes, Fast Company, and Entrepreneur.

== Political career ==
Freiling served on the campaign and U.S. House of Representatives staff of James M. Inhofe (R-OK) from 1989 to 1992. He was on the 2004 founding Board of Directors of the conservative action network Grassfire.org. In February 2012 Freiling was named executive director of Patriot Super PAC, an independent-expenditure only committee registered with the FEC, till it closed in 2013.

== Bibliography ==
- Freiling, Thomas; Klassen, Michael (2000). Prayers to Move Your Mountains. Thomas Nelson Publishers. ISBN 978-0785286523.
- Freiling, Tom (2000). Reagan's God and Country: A President's Moral Compass: His Beliefs on God, Religious Freedom, the Sanctity of Life and More, Gospel Light Publications. Gospel Light Publications. ISBN 9780830757077.
- Freiling, Thomas (2002). Abraham Lincoln's Daily Treasure: Moments of Faith with America's Favorite President. F.H.Revell. ISBN 9780800718091.
- Bush, George W.; Freiling, Thomas (2004). George W. Bush on God and Country: The President Speaks Out About Faith, Principle, and Patriotism. Allegiance Press. ISBN 978-1591609186.
- Freiling, Thomas (2009). Walking with Lincoln: Spiritual Strength from America's Favorite President. F.H.Revell. ISBN 978-0800719012.
- Freiling, Thomas (2020). The Right to Believe. Vide Press. ISBN 978-0578703572.

== See also ==
- Political Action Committee
- Regnery Publishing
- Samaritan Fundraising
- Human Events
