= Regional associations of road authorities =

This article lists the main regional associations for road authorities from around the world. Many of these are associated with the World Road Association.

== Africa ==
- The Association des Gestionnaires et Partenaires Africains de la Route (AGEPAR) or African Road Managers and Partners Association is the association for road authorities predominantly in north and western Africa.
- The Association of Southern Africa National Road Agencies (ASANRA) is an association of national roads agencies or authorities in the Southern African Development Community.

== Asia and Australasia ==
- The Road Engineering Association of Asia and Australasia was established in 1973 as a regional body to promote and advance the science and practice of road engineering and related professions.

== Europe and Asia ==
- The Baltic Roads Association was established for the cooperation of the Estonian, Latvian and Lithuanian Road Administrations.
- The Conference of European Directors of Roads or Conférence Européenne des Directeurs des Routes is a Brussels-based organisation for the Directors of National Road Authorities in Europe.
- Межправительственный совет дорожников (MSD) or Intergovernmental Council of Roads, is the road authority organisation of the Commonwealth of Independent States. MSD was founded in 1992 as the Interstate Council of Roads In 1998 the Council of Roads was given Intergovernmental organisation status. It assists in the cooperation between member road administrations in the field of design, construction, maintenance and scientific and technological policies in the road sector.
- The Nordic Road Association (NVF) was established in 1935. The founding members were Denmark, Finland, Iceland, Norway and Sweden; the Faroe Islands became a member in 1975.

== North and South America ==
- The Consejo de Directores de Carreteras de Iberia e Iberoamérica (DIRCAIBEA) / Board of Directors of Iberia and Latin America Roads was created in 1995. Twenty-two countries have representation in DIRCAIBEA; The two Iberian countries, Spain and Portugal, and 20 countries of the Americas and the Caribbean, Argentina, Bolivia, Brazil, Chile, Colombia, Costa Rica, Cuba; Ecuador, El Salvador, Guatemala, Honduras, Mexico, Nicaragua, Panama, Paraguay, Peru, Puerto Rico, the Dominican Republic, Uruguay and Venezuela.
- American Association of State Highway and Transportation Officials (AASHTO): although technically a national association of state authorities, AASHTO activities also include most Canadian provinces.
