= Patricia Wasley =

- Occupations: Dean, Professor
- Writing career
- Subjects: Teacher education, Student voice, Education reform

Patricia Wasley, EdD, is the Chief Executive Officer at Teaching Channel and is responsible for setting the educational direction of the website. Prior to joining Teaching Channel, Dr. Wasley was dean of the College of Education at the University of Washington from 2000 to 2012. Wasley has conducted a variety of research on student voice, teacher education and whole-school reform. She is the author of several books on school reform, including Teachers Who Lead and Stirring the Chalkdust, and is the co-author of Kids and School Reform.

== Biography ==
Wasley earned her Bachelor of Arts degree in English at Western Washington University in 1973. She earned her teaching certification in 1975 from WWU as well. She began her education career in 1975 as an English and Social Studies teacher in Perth, Australia. In 1977 she became an English teacher at Nooksack Valley High School in Everson, Washington, serving in that capacity until 1982, when she became the curriculum supervisor at Educational Service District 112 in Vancouver, Washington. That year she completed her Master of Arts degree in English at WWU.

In 1984 Wasley became a Fulbright scholar. In 1985 Wasley became the assistant superintendent of Educational Service District 112. In 1988 she was the Project Director for the Teacher Leadership Strand for the Puget Sound Educational Consortium in Seattle, and the following year she became the Senior Researcher for School Change with the Coalition of Essential Schools and at the Annenberg Institute for School Reform at Brown University. In 1989 she earned her Doctor of Education In 1996 she began a four-year tenure as dean of the Graduate School at Bank Street College of Education in New York City.

=== University of Washington ===
Wasley became the dean of the College of Education at the University of Washington in 2000. At the University of Washington, Wasley has become recognized as a national leader in education reform. She is the co-principal investigator for "Teachers for a New Era," a $5,000,000 grant awarded in 2003 to the University of Washington by the Carnegie Corporation that is aimed at strengthening preschool through twelfth grade teaching by developing state-of-the art schools of education. She has led the development of partnerships between the University of Washington and institutions in China, South Africa, and England.

Wasley also led a major study of Chicago’s small-schools initiative and is currently leading a five-year national action project aimed at ensuring quality teachers. "Strengthening and Sustaining Teachers" is a project that seeks to stem the high rate of teacher attrition by building a continuum of support from preparation through the fifth year of teaching.

=== Teaching Channel ===
Wasley is currently Chief Executive Officer for Teaching Channel. Among her duties as CEO, Pat is responsible for establishing educational priorities for new video production and product development, ensuring all of Tch's work is pedagogically sound and managing outreach to the education and academic communities.

== Community involvement ==
Wasley sits on advisory boards and board of directors for several regional and national education-focused nonprofit organizations. They include the National Board for Professional Teaching Standards; the Washington State Professional Educator Standards Board; the Scarsdale Teachers Institute; the University of Kansas Institute for Academic Access; the Educational Video Center; the Teaching and Change Editorial Review Board; the Journal for a Just and Caring Education Editorial Review Board; the SoundOut advisory board; and as an ex officio member of the Foxfire Corporation Board of Directors.

== Awards and honors ==
- (2000) Distinguished Graduate Award, University of Washington College of Education
- (1999) Distinguished lecturer, National Staff Development Council
- (1996) Invited address, American Educational Research Association
- (1998) Invited scholar, University of Alabama
- (1984) Fulbright Scholar

== Select bibliography ==
- (2003) "A Better Windmill: Teacher Education at the University of Washington," Educational Perspectives. (Spring/Summer)
- (2002) "Small Classes, Small Schools: The Time is Now," Educational Leadership (February)
- "In Search of Authentic Reform," Voices in Urban Education, and "Responsible Accountability and Teacher Learning," in Accountability Run Amok: Toward More Responsible Appraisal of Our Children and Their Schools. Sirotnik, K. (ed).
- (1997) Kids and School Reform. with Hampel, R. and Clark, R. San Francisco: Jossey-Bass.
- (1994) Stirring the Chalkdust: Tales of Teachers Changing Classroom Practice. New York: Teachers College Press.
- (1991) Teachers Who Lead: The Rhetoric of Reform and the Realities of Practice. New York: Teachers College Press.
