= Academic Earth =

Website offering free online video courses and academic lectures

Academic Earth is a website launched on March 24, 2009, by Richard Ludlow and co-founders Chris Bruner and Liam Pisano, which offers free online video courses and academic lectures from the world's top universities such as UC Berkeley, UCLA, University of Michigan, University of Oxford, Harvard, MIT, Princeton, Stanford, and Yale. It is considered a search engine for full-text scholarly information, with video courses covering around 50 primary subject disciplines ranging from Arts and Design, Astronomy, Biology, Chemistry, Computer Science, Economics, Engineering, English, Entrepreneurship, History, Humanities, Law, Mathematics, Medicine, Philosophy, Physics, Political Science, Psychology, Religion, and Statistics.

== History ==
The idea behind Academic Earth came to Ludlow upon stumbling on a full video course lecture from MIT Mathematics Professor Gilbert Strang. Doing further research, he found out that there are various academic resources online, although these resources were scattered across different websites and in varying file formats. Patterned after Hulu, Academic Earth serves as an easily accessible repository for online academic lectures. The platform is also likened to what Google was trying to do with its defunct Knol project, which aggregated scholarly articles. It was launched two days before YouTube introduced its own YouTube EDU service.

The website also offers online courses, but unlike their formal versions, Academic Earth only publishes sorted video courses and sends users to the academic institutions offering them if they wish to complete it. Participants also have little interaction with educators and with each other.

On January 10, 2012, it was announced that Academic Earth has been acquired by Ampush.
