= Do Lectures =

The DO Lectures is an annual event that was founded in 2008 on the west coast of Wales by Clare and David Hieatt

Those attending go online. There are now there are over 200 talks available online. Speakers include Sir Tim Bernes Lee, Marion Deuchars, Maggie Doyne, and David Allen.

== Locations ==
DO now happens on four continents.

In West Wales, the Do lectures is held on the Hieatts Farm, Parc y Pratt.

In California, Do Lectures USA is organised by the Do lectures 2009 speaker Duke Stump with Anna Beuselinck & Gary Breen of Campovida - a certified organic farm and working vineyard.

the DO lectures Australia was conceived in May 2013 and is co-created by Samantha Bell, Melinda Jacobsen and Tess and Graham Payne of Payne's Hut.

In November 2014, Sebastian Castro, Javier Carda and Pablo Jenkins envisioned the DO lectures Costa Rica and co-create it with Edward Zaydelman of Puerta Vita.

It also ignited the Do Book Company in May 2013.

Next up, is the Do Ideas Farm.

== The Giving Chair prize ==
The Giving Chair is a sponsored spot at The DO Lectures so that students can attend for free. An applicant submits a 90 second video about themselves and then another after the event to pass on everything they learned to the company that foot the bill for their chair.
