= Norbert Feith =

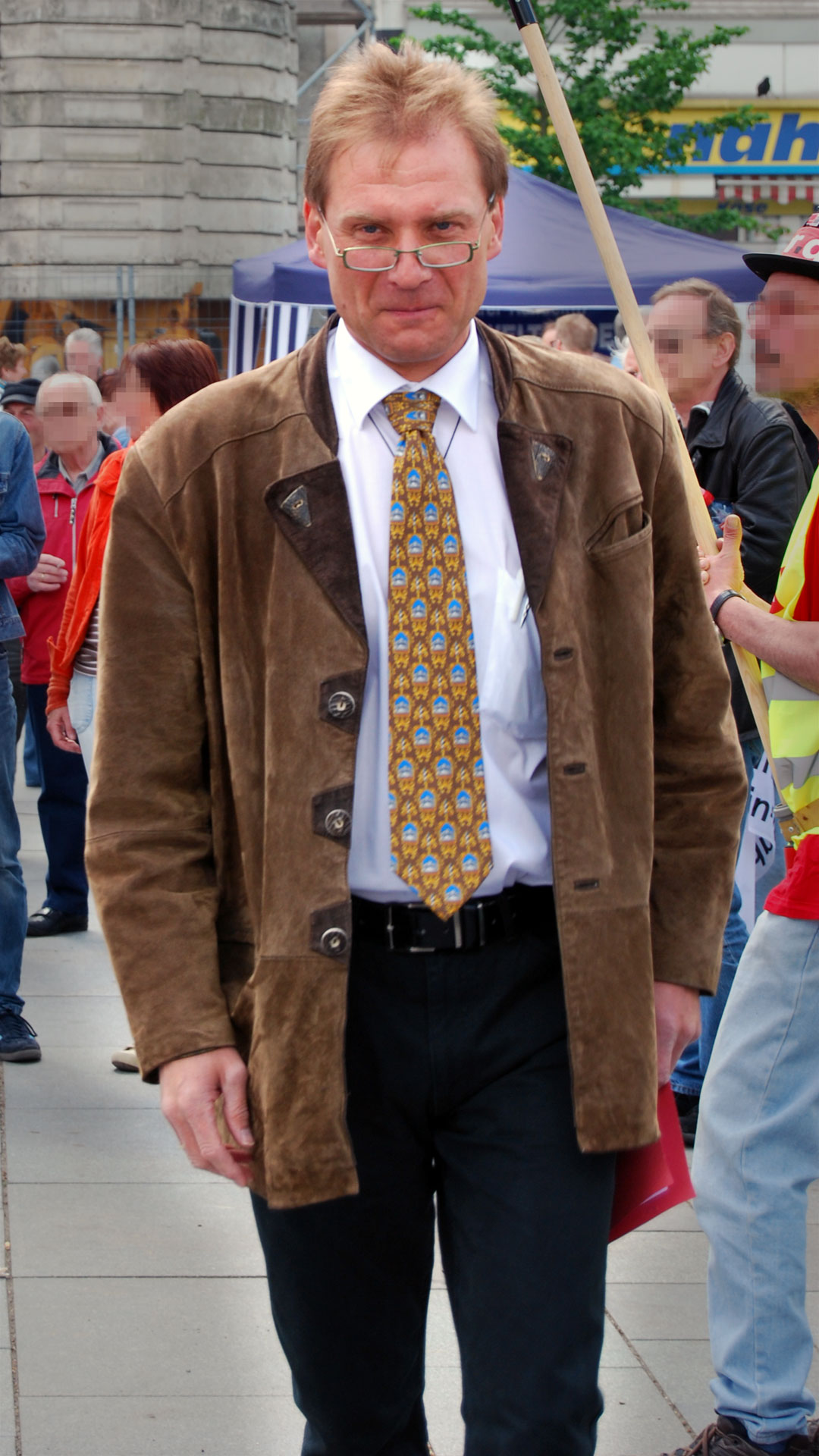
Norbert Feith at the DGB May Day rally in Solingen (2010)

Norbert Feith (born in Bergisch Gladbach, Germany, on August 15, 1958) is a German politician (CDU), and was mayor of the city of Solingen from 2009 to 2015.

== Professional activities ==
=== Mayor of Solingen (2009-2015) ===
On 30 August 2009, Feith was elected as the new Mayor of Solingen, succeeding the office of his predecessor, Franz Haug (CDU).

=== Administrative employee in the federal service (2015-present) ===
On 1 November 2016, Norbert Feith returned to the Federal Ministry for Family Affairs, Senior Citizens, Women, and Youth, and works part-time as an administrative assistant at the ministry's office in the German city of Bonn.
