= Adolph Diesterweg =

German educator and philosopher

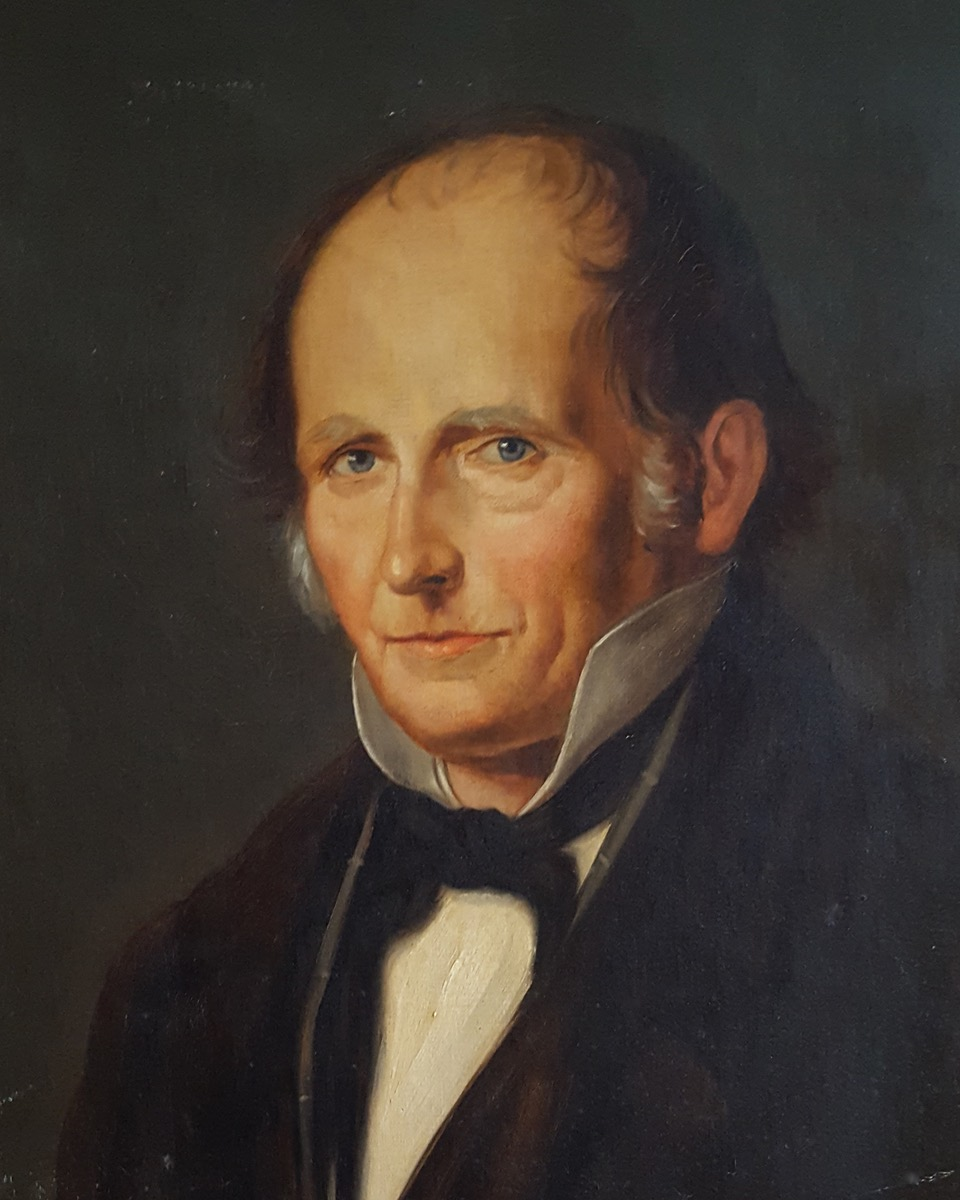

Signature
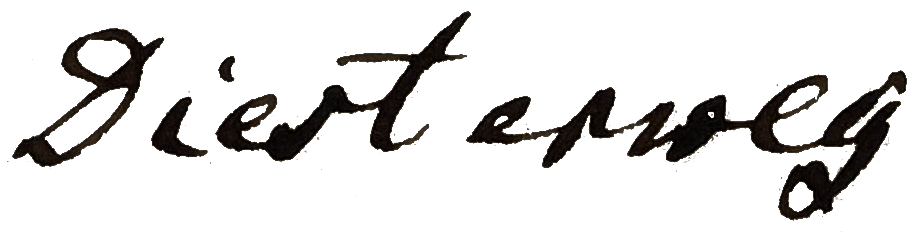

Friedrich Adolph Wilhelm Diesterweg (29 October 1790 in Siegen – 7 July 1866 in Berlin) was a German educator, thinker, and progressive liberal politician, who campaigned for the secularization of schools. He is said to be precursory to the reform of social pedagogy. Diesterweg is considered as "a teacher of teachers".

== Biography ==
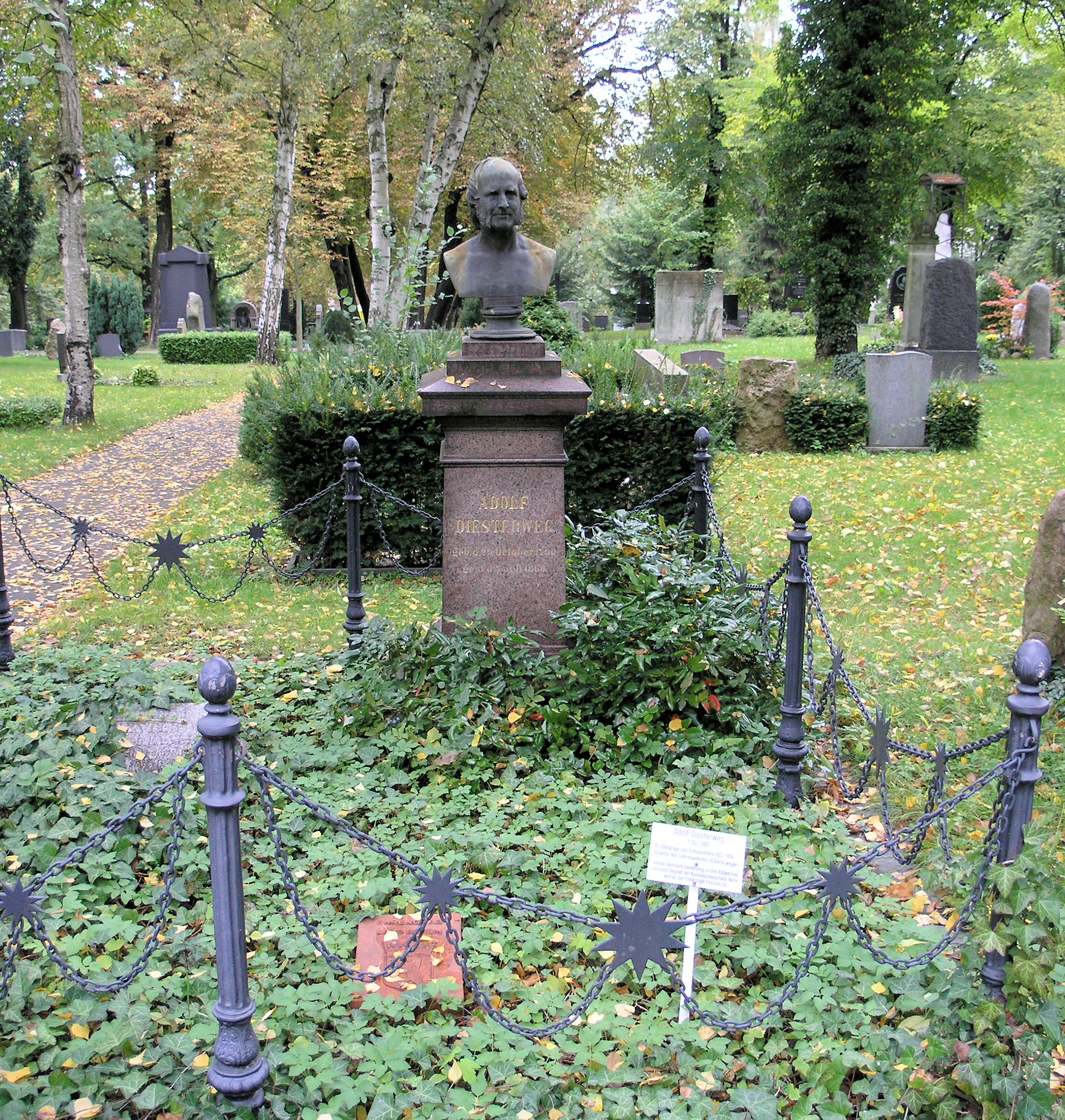
Tomb at Alter St.-Matthäus-Kirchhof in Berlin-Schöneberg

Educated at Herborn and Tübingen universities 1808–1811, Diesterweg began teaching in 1811. He taught at Mannheim and at Worms for about two years, and then moved to the model school in Frankfurt am Main. Later he became rector of the Latin school of Elberfeld. In 1820, he was appointed director of the new teacher's seminary at Mörs where he put in practice the methods of Pestalozzi. In 1832, he was summoned to Berlin to direct the new state-schools seminary in that city. Here he proved himself a strong supporter of nonsectarian religious teaching. In 1846, he established the Pestalozzi institution at Pankow, and the Pestalozzi societies for the support of teachers’ widows and orphans. Because of his disagreement with the authorities regarding important phases of higher education he was in constant friction and resigned from the seminary in 1847. In 1850, he received a government pension. Thereafter, he continued to vigorously advocate his educational ideas through the medium of periodicals. In 1858, he was elected to the chamber of deputies as member for the city of Berlin, and voted with the Liberal opposition.

== Philosophy ==
Diesterweg thought criticalness and responsibility were important in teaching, and sought to reform social, economic and moral aspects of education publishing the influential Pädagogisch Wollen und Sollen. He based his program on what was named the "basic principles of the struggle for life" that he saw in the Catholicism/Protestantism conflict. He thought there were several 'oppositions' (distinct choices) that were available in the conflict which could be reduced to a single "authority or freedom, Catholicism or Protestantism".

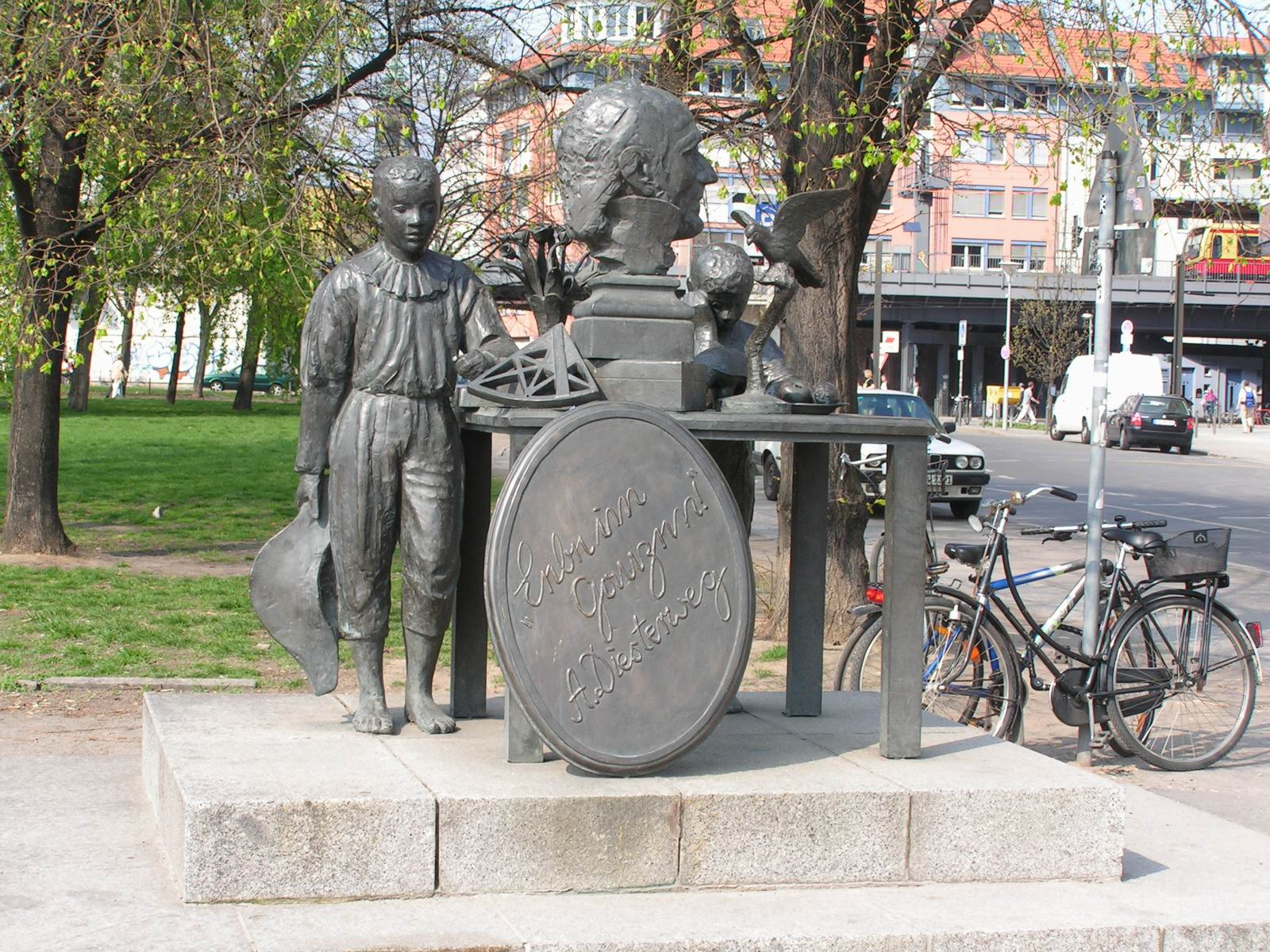
Statue to Diesterweg

In his effort to reform schooling Diesterweg wanted to remove political and religious influence in the teaching itself and instead involve more of a social factor. He believed in the availability of education: "First educate men, before worrying about their professional training or class, [because] the proletarian and the peasant should both be educated to become human beings"; he also believed that through education the poor could be helped. He wanted professionalization of state teachers and fought for the relative autonomy of schools; he also had an influence on the teachers of that time through his newspaper Rheinische Blätter.

== Works ==
Diesterweg was a voluminous writer on educational subjects, and was the author of various school text-books. He authored 50 books and published about 400 papers; he has been credited with originated the phrase 'learn to do by doing' by one source. In 1851, he founded the Pädagogisches Jahrbuch ("Yearbook of Pedagogy") in Berlin. Among his publications were:

- Wegweiser zur Bildung für deutsche Lehrer. ("Guide for the Instruction of German Teachers") 2 vols., 1834; 6th ed., 1 vol., 1890
- Das pädagogische Deutschland. ("German Pedagogy") 1836
- Streitfragen auf dem Gebiete der Pädagogik. ("Controversial Questions in the Field of Pedagogy") 1837
- Leitfaden für den Unterricht in der Formlehre (1845)
- Lehrbuch der mathematischen Geographie (1840; 18th ed., as Populäre Himmelskunde, 1891)
- Unterricht in der Kleinkinderschule (5th ed., 1852)
