= TeacherTube =

Educational resources sharing website

- Website type: Educational
- Available in: English
- Owners: Salem Web Network, LLC
- Creator: User content
- Founders: Adam Smith; Jason Smith
- Key people: David Bingham, VP
- Website: http://www.teachertube.com
- Commercial: Yes
- Registration: optional
- Launched: 2007
- Current status: active

TeacherTube is a video sharing website. It is designed to allow those in the educational industry, particularly teachers, to share educational resources such as video, audio, documents, photos, groups and blogs. The site contains a mixture of classroom teaching resources and others designed for teacher training. A number of students have also uploaded videos that they have made as part of K-12 and college courses. As of July 2008, the website contained over 26,000 videos. In October 2010, TeacherTube had over a million members and over 400,000 educational videos. It has found favor with educators from institutions where YouTube content is blocked by content filtering systems.

On September 1, 2017, TeacherTube was acquired by Salem Web Network, a Christian website company owned and operated by Salem Media Group, which targets audiences interested in Christian and family-themed content and conservative values.

== History ==
TeacherTube was launched on March 6, 2007, by Jason Smith, a Superintendent from Melissa, Texas and younger brother Adam Smith. In 2007, the site garnered 10 million page views per month. The site ran a number of creative educational competitions, in association with companies such as Texas Instruments and Interwrite. Institutions such as South Carolina State Library are using the service to disseminate information.

== Partnerships ==
In 2009 TeacherTube partnered with NASA's Ares and NASA's Ares TV program. Since the partnership started, the Ares videos have reached students across the world.

In 2007, TeacherTube partnered with the American Institute for History Education (AIHE). The AIHE Channel on TeacherTube has now branched off to AIHE TV which broadcasts live reaching the state of New Jersey.

TeacherTube created the Non-Profit Program Channel for Non-Profit organizations. TeacherTube partnered with UNICEF and the TeachUNICEF program, Adopt a Classroom and the North Texas History Center.

== See also ==
- List of educational video websites
