= Fora.tv =

FORA.tv, Inc.
- Company type: Privately held
- Website type: Video production, webcasting and video on demand
- Founded: 2005
- Dissolved: 2018
- Headquarters: San Francisco, California, U.S.
- Key people: Founding team: Brian Gruber, Bob Appel, Stuart Schulzke, Trevar Mazza, and Allen Claghorn. Longtime second CEO, Blaise Zerega.
- Website: fora.tv

FORA.tv was a video production and distribution company formed in 2005 to produce and distribute videos on 'issues and ideas that matter'. It was dissolved in 2018. It was recognized by TIME magazine as one of the "50 Best Websites of 2009." The company served more than 500 organizations, including leading media organizations and academic institutions.

== Company history ==
FORA was founded by Brian Gruber, formerly the first marketing director for C-SPAN in 2005. He assembled a founding team made up of Bob Appel, Stuart Schulzke, Trevar Mazza, and Allen Claghorn. Gruber intended it as a forum for the exchange of ideas and conversation (which was why he gave it the name "fora", the plural of "forum"), and to provide video services to conferences. By 2008, the company had partnered with numerous schools and institutions, acquiring a library of public lectures and colloquia.

The firm was funded by private investors.

== Services ==
FORA.tv's unique content mission led to long-term partnerships with the Aspen Institute, Atlantic Media, Wired magazine, and more than a hundred think tanks, universities, and media organizations. It also provided services in video production and distribution. The revenue methods for its partners included sponsorships, pay-per-view, and advertising. For a decade before its dissolution, FORA.tv had offices in San Francisco and New York City.

== Video library ==
FORA.tv created a digital forum where people could discuss information on technology, politics, culture, entertainment, and more. Its curated library featured more than 25,000 unmediated videos drawn from its clients’ live events, lectures, and debates at universities, think tanks, conferences, etc.

The library provided several ways to interact with the videos, such as comments, transcripts, and translations. In February 2009, the company partnered with Wired in creating a channel for videos about technological, science, business, and cultural issues. Time featured the website and four others in its "50 Best Websites of 2009". Fora.tv was praised for its intellectual videos, with a few calling it "The C-SPAN of the Web", and it was compared with TED Talks. Website traffic continued to grow for the hour-long videos to about 3 million views per month by September 2010, tripling in 18 months.

On August 31, 2018, the online video library was taken down. The earlier version of the website had boasted that "brilliant ideas are expressed everyday, everywhere, and we don't want you to miss them" and invited a visitor to "watch events". After the takedown of the library, the site only advertised video production services, mentioning in passing "25,000+ videos produced".

As of July 2019, the website "fora.tv" was no longer accessible and remains inaccessible as of April 2026.
