= Docsity =

Social learning network

Docsity.com
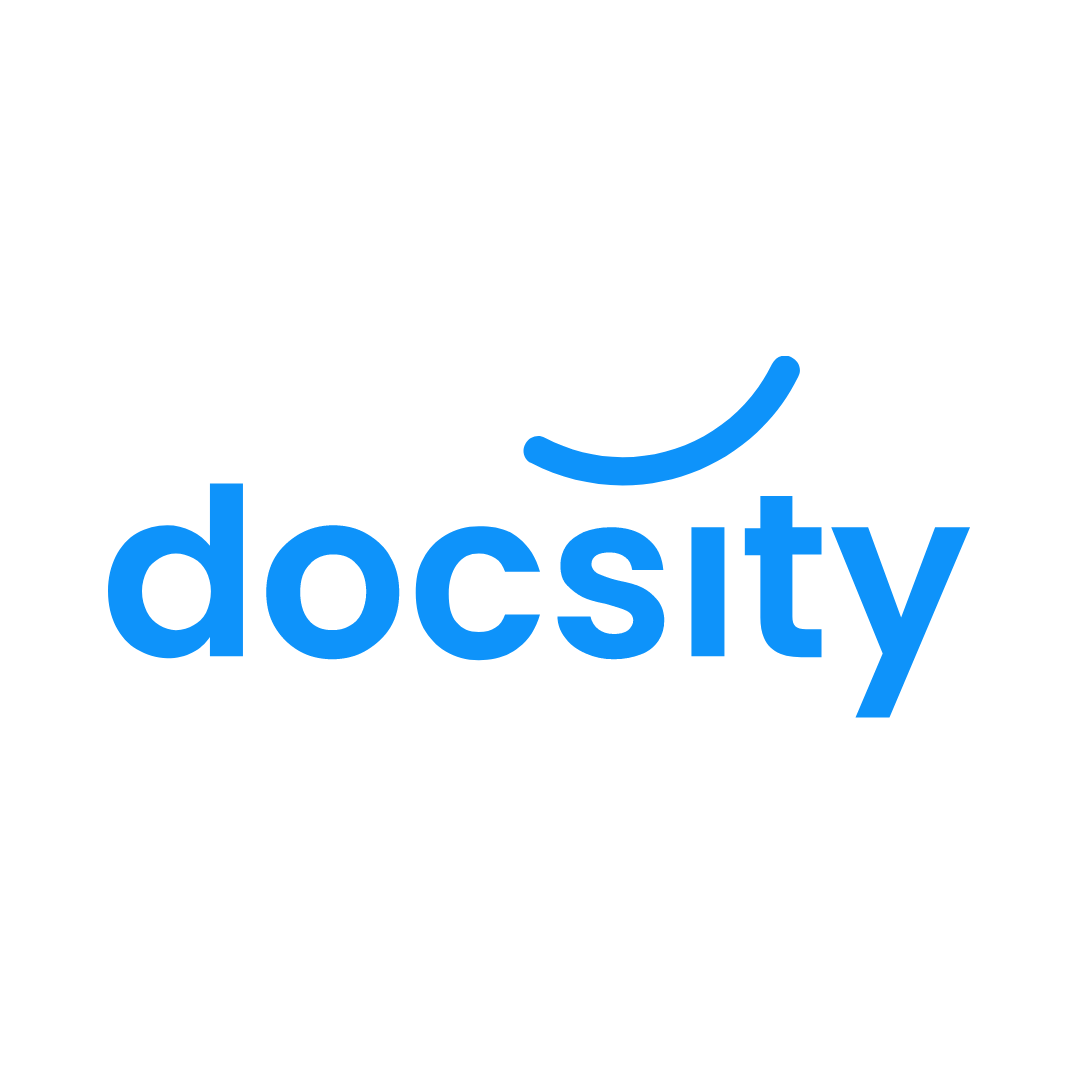
- Company type: Private
- Website type: Social learning (social pedagogy)
- Available in: English, Spanish, Portuguese, Italian, Serbian, Russian, Polish
- Founded: Turin, Italy (Jan 2010)
- Headquarters: Turin, Italy
- Key people: Riccardo Ocleppo (CEO, Founder)
- Services: Social reading, publishing and sharing platform
- Website: http://www.docsity.com
- Launched: June 2011
- Current status: Active

Docsity is an online social learning network for worldwide students and professionals. Originally launched in 2010 exclusively for Italian students, it became an international website in mid-2012 by opening to worldwide students. It is advertisement-free and user-generated.

Docsity provides 3,019,782 study documents catalogued by subject and study path. Currently, the platform is available in 9 languages including: Italian, English, French, Spanish, Portuguese, German, Serbian, Polish and Russian and has 15,435,176 registered students.

== History ==
"After finishing the polytechnic, I found myself with a mountain of excellent Electronic Engineering notes. So I asked myself: why not share them with students from all over Italy?" Riccardo Ocleppo, founder

Docsity started as an initiative by Riccardo, who was displeased, during his university experience, with time management and the possibility of deepening study subjects. He had realized that finding correct study notes was difficult or even impossible, but he was trying to solve these aspects of university life. So he started Docsity.com, an online platform where students could share and view notes for free and also could discuss them with one another. In a very short time, thousands of students had registered on the platform, interested in the quality shared contents. Subsequently, the main Italian newspapers took notice including La Stampa, Il Fatto Quotidiano, Il Corriere and Il Sole 24 Ore.

== Features ==
- Document sharing: students can share their study notes and all their university-related documents for other students to search, view, and download.
- Networking: it helps students to meet with other students through friendships, have fun studying, interact on each other's walls and get notifications on friends' activities.
- News and Blogs: students can read various articles on everyday student life and become authors by submitting blog posts.
- Video sharing: students can share and catalog academic videos from YouTube or upload their own videos for other students to view.
- Q & A section: students from around the world can interact and help one another by answering questions and voting other contributions.

Docsity has around 300,000+ study notes shared by students, 400,000+ Questions and Answers, 500+ published articles, 2,000+ academic videos and 500,000+ university students^{(Unofficial figures)}.

== Technology ==
Docsity allows its users to upload, download and share notes (including .doc, .pdf, .ppt and popular image formats). Its question and answer section allows students to ask and answer questions, and to vote, rate, and comment on the answers. The video section offers videos cataloged or uploaded by students and can be searched by subject, course and type. The news and blog section contains news articles by university students on numerous topics related to education and everyday student life.

The website offers a star rating and comments feature on all its content for the users for their feedback. These ratings are used to rank the content in the charts. Docsity allows users to post on walls, reply to comments, request friendships, search users from specific universities, and areas of interest. The user base not only consists of students from universities and colleges but also faculty members, company professionals, and formal students. Docsity takes studying to a new social level, Study 2.0, the YouTube video gives a visual introduction to all the features that Docsity offers.

== Points system ==
Docsity is free to use, but to increase the users' contributions it has a points management system. Users are awarded points for sharing content and contributing to Docsity. These points are used to download content and gain a reputation on the website.
