= Karl Mager =

Karl Mager (January 1, 1810 – June 10, 1858) was a German educator.

== Early life and education ==
Karl Mager was born in Gräfrath.[1] He studied philology at the universities of Bonn, Berlin, and Paris,[2] and remained in Paris for several years. During this time, he authored Versuch einer Geschichte und Charakteristik der französischen Nationallitteratur (“Attempt at a History and Characterization of the French National Literature,” 1834–1839, 5 vols.).[1]

In 1840, he published Die deutsche Bürgerschule, and founded the journal Pädagogische Revue, both of which would be influential on German and Swiss public education. He edited the Pädagogische Revue until 1849, taught foreign languages in the cantonal schools of Aarau to test his theories in a practical setting, and published Die genetische Methode des Unterrichts in fremden Sprachen ("The genetic method of instruction in foreign languages", 1846). From 1848 to 1852 he directed the Realschule in Eisenach according to his theories, but he retired in 1852 due to poor health, and died in 1858 in Wiesbaden.

An 1844 pamphlet of his coined the term "social pedagogy", a broad concept of education, particularly influential in German pedagogy, that focuses on the acquisition of culture by society (rather than the acquisition of knowledge by individuals) as its key element.
