= SchoolTube =

Children video community

- Website type: Education / Online Media
- Available in: English
- Creators: User-generated and professional content
- Website: http://www.schooltube.com

SchoolTube is a free K-12 video community based in St. Louis, Missouri. The company was founded in 2007 by Carl Arizpe and his son, Andrew.

== Access in schools ==
SchoolTube has widespread use in American primary and secondary schools. As of 2013, there are registered SchoolTube users in over 50,000 K–12 (kindergarten through 12th grade) schools in the US who are uploading, on average, 1,000 videos a day. All student-generated content is teacher-moderated. Most schools have blocked commercial video platforms from the classroom due to inappropriate content. SchoolTube has been granted this access due to a moderation process to ensures user-generated content is appropriate for the K–12 environment. SchoolTube is endorsed by various national education associations include the American Association of School Librarians and the National Science Teachers Association.

== Moderation process ==
SchoolTube's uses a moderation process which it claims makes it safe for usage within K-12 classrooms. When a student decides to upload a video, a teacher or administrator from that student's school must approve the video before it will be made live on the site. Schools also have the option to limit the video viewing to its own school.
