= Salem Web Network =

Christian website company

- Available in: English
- Owner: Salem Web Network
- Creator: Salem Web Network
- Website: Salemwebnetwork.com
- Commercial: Yes
- Registration: Optional
- Current status: Active

Salem Web Network is a Christian website company, headquartered in Richmond, Virginia. The company is owned and operated by Salem Media Group.

== History ==
Jun 9, 2025, Salem Web Network launched GodTube Music.

Oct 8, 2024, Salem Media Group announces Salem Web Network and LifeAudio podcast partnership with Jesus Calling.

Apr 18, 2022, Salem Media Announces Promotion of David Bingham.

June 15, 2010, Salem Media acquired GodTube.com.

2002, Crosswalk.com was acquired.

== Websites ==
The network owns over 13 national sites and 100 local websites for Salem radio stations featuring Bible study tools, devotionals, music and ministry streaming, conservative news and commentary, Christian e-cards, video and social networking and other material.

- BibleStudyTools.com is an online Bible resource with 31 translations, verse search, Bible commentaries, Bible concordances, Bible dictionaries, reading plans, lexicons, apocrypha, and Christian devotional literature. The website allows users to highlight and underline verses and create Bible reading plans, take and save notes in the online "margins" and share them online. It also includes tools to allow small groups and Sunday school classes to create group pages for studying Scripture together.
- Christianity.com is a Christian web portal, providing articles on current topics, the history of Christianity, apologetics and other topics.
- ChristianJobs.com is an employment website focusing on employment within the Christian community. It claims 241,617 registered members and 44,165 resumes in their database. It provides job postings, résumé listings, eCoaching, eMentoring and a business network.
- ChurchStaffing.com is an employment website that aims to connect churches and ministries in the US and Canada with staff candidates. Users may post job openings and résumés, browse church and ministry vacancies, and shop in an online resource store. The site has an agreement with Secure Search to provide faith-based organizations with background checks for staff and volunteers. The site also has free sample job descriptions and a salary comparison database.
- Crosswalk.com was acquired in 2002, and is built around four primary content areas – faith, family, fun and community. The content is provided by ministries such as Focus on the Family, Insight for Living from Chuck Swindoll, John Piper, John F. MacArthur, and others. The site features movie reviews, music and book reviews, homeschooling resources, a directory, and other Christian resources.
- GodTube is a Christian video hosting service. In June 2010 Salem Web Network acquired GodTube.com and Tangle.com. Viewers can watch and share videos, access Christian music, read the Bible online through the Online Bible, and upload prayers to the Prayer Wall and network with other users.
- LightSource.com is a Christian video portal streaming over 100 ministry broadcasts with video on demand, podcasts and program archives. Contributors include John F. MacArthur, Greg Laurie, Jack Graham, Joel Osteen, Adrian Rogers, Beth Moore, T.D. Jakes, Joyce Meyer, and others. It received the Best Broadcast Website Award in 2008 by the National Religious Broadcasters.
- OnePlace.com, launched in 1998, has 13 million page views and 1.3 million unique users per month. It provides online streaming of 150 broadcast ministries and 200 radio programs. OnePlace.com received the 2007 National Religious Broadcasters Media Award for Internet-Best Broadcasting Website.
- SermonSearch.com was originally an independent website named "Ministers' Resource Center". In 1997, OnePlace.com purchased the site and renamed it "SermonSearch.com". The focus of the site became presentation of sermons in text format. It includes more than 21,000 sermon outlines, Christian worship backgrounds, motion loops, and video clips that can be downloaded for a fee.
- TeacherTube is video sharing website designed to allow those in the educational industry, particularly teachers, to share user-generated educational videos and other resources.
- TheFish.com is a website for pop culture news and entertainment reviews from a Christian perspective. Its entertainment culture reviews include movies, DVDs, television, books, video games, and music.
