= World Road Association =

International forum for the discussion of roads

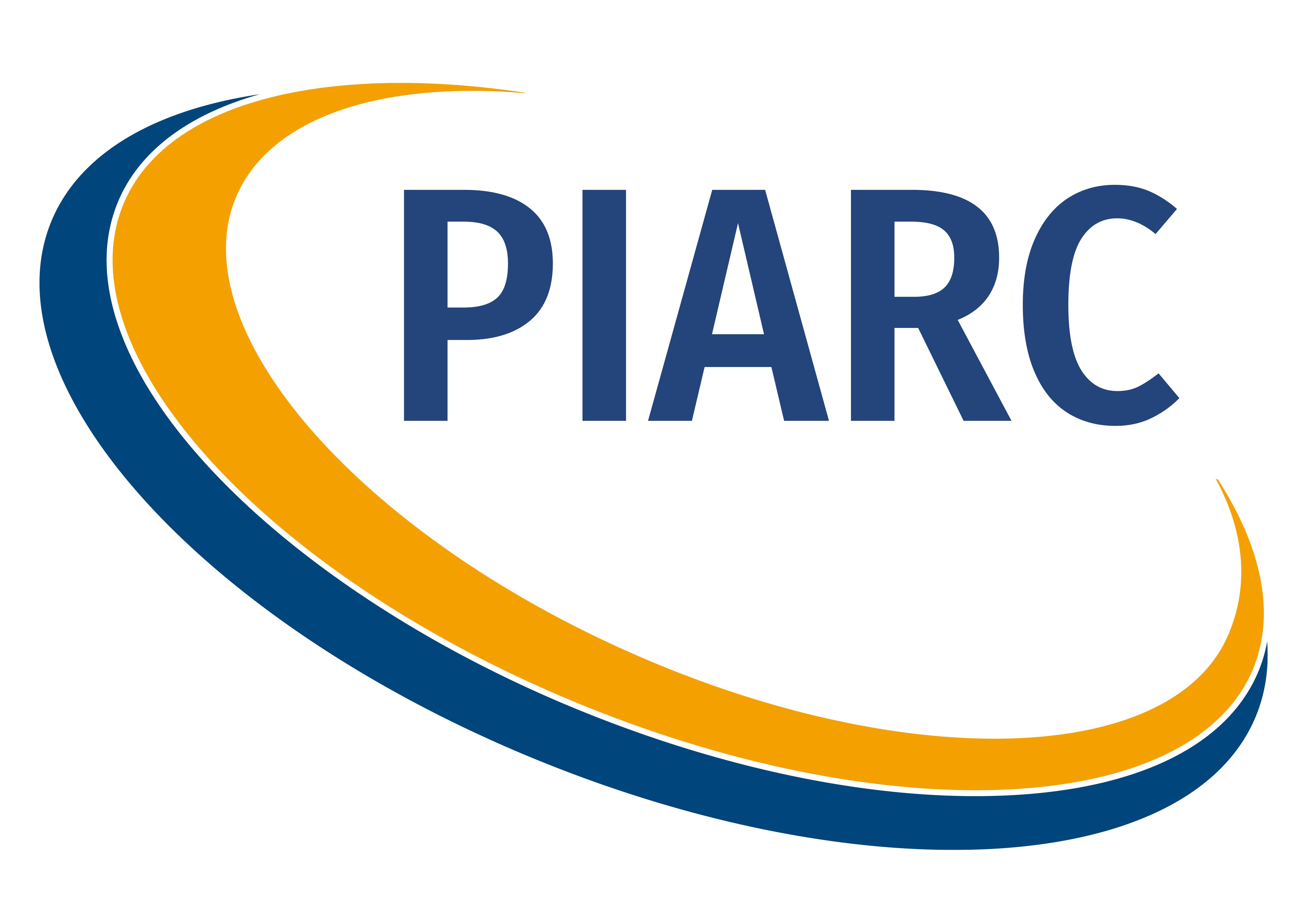
- PIARC logo
- Formation: 1909
- Headquarters: Paris, France
- Members: 122 member countries
- Official language: English, French, Spanish
- Website: www.piarc.org
- Formerly called: Association Internationale Permanente des Congrès de la route (AIPCR); Permanent International Association of Road Congresses (PIARC); World Road Association (WRA)

PIARC (World Road Association) is an international forum for the discussion of all aspects of roads and road networks.

== Overview ==
Though established principally for professionals in its 122 member countries round the world, it also provides an overview of the policies and trends that affect all road users. The Association was founded in 1909, following the first international road congress held in Paris when it was the called the Association Internationale Permanente des Congrès de la Route (AIPCR), or in English, the Permanent International Association of Road Congresses (PIARC). In 2019, it formally adopted the name PIARC.

Its head office is located in Paris where its origins began in 1908.

== Terminology ==
In 1931, the first edition of the "Road Dictionary" was published in six languages (Danish, English, French, German, Italian, and Spanish). The World Road Association has continued working on terminology ever since. In 2007, the eighth edition was released in five languages (English, French, German, Portuguese, and Spanish).

== See also ==
- Regional associations of road authorities

== Literature ==
- Strategies for Road Network Operations. Report 2012R26 World Road Association (PIARC). Paris: World Road Association Technical Committee on Road Network Operations. 2012. ISBN 978-2-84060-393-1..
