= Teaching Channel =

- Website type: Corporation
- Headquarters: Eagan, Minnesota, {{{location_country}}}
- Key people: Jim Hall, Wendy Amato, Don Rescigno, Mike Smith
- Industry: Education
- Website: www.teachingchannel.com
- Launched: 2011

Teaching Channel is a multi-platform service founded in 2010 delivering professional development videos for teachers over the Internet. In addition to showcasing inspiring teachers in videos, Teaching Channel also hosts a community for educators to share ideas, best practices and enhance their knowledge. Started as a nonprofit organization, the company was converted to a for-profit in 2017.

== Goals ==
The stated mission of Teaching Channel is to revolutionize how teachers learn, connect, and inspire each other to improve the outcomes for all students in America. To accomplish this, Teaching Channel has established three goals:

- Build teacher-driven professional learning
- Deepen and improve opportunities for teacher learning
- Elevate and celebrate teachers in our society

Prior to its conversion to a for-profit business, the Bill and Melinda Gates Foundation provided a $3.5 million grant to help fund the educational service.

== Topics and subjects ==
The videos on the Teaching Channel website cover a variety of subjects and classroom topics for teachers at all grade levels: from kindergarten through high school.

Videos on the site are categorized in several ways: by grade level, by subject area, including Math, English Language Arts (ELA), Science and History, and by topic. The topic list includes: planning, class culture, class management, engagement, differentiation, assessment, collaboration, common core, new teachers, English Language Learners, growth mindset, and social and emotional learning.

Teaching Channel also partners with other innovative companies to deliver videos on new topics. They teamed up with the Boeing Company to develop a curriculum series on engineering and with Common Sense Media to develop a series of 9 videos covering digital literacy and the ELA Common Core Standards.

Teaching Channel's videos are used by many teachers, schools and school districts around the country to enhance professional development.

== Online community size ==
The online community for Teaching Channel is a forum for teachers where they can reach out to other educators to get guidance on teaching methods, strategies, lesson plans and curriculum. Currently there are nearly 1 million members of the community, made up of teachers, administrators, coaches, and educational support personnel.

In early 2013, Teaching Channel launched a new Q&A section that allows teachers to ask questions and get advice from other educators.

In late 2016, Teaching Channel launched a new Deep Dives section that curates video and blog content, as well as external partner content, on a range of topics from growth mindset to new teachers.

Mike Smith is the President of Teaching Channel.

Sarah Brown Wessling, 2010 National Teacher of the Year, is one of 10 Teaching Channel Laureates. Sarah and the other laureates write regularly for the Tcher's Voice blog.

== Teaching Channel Presents ==
Teaching Channel Presents was the title of the weekly broadcast show that aired on public television stations across the country. Each hour-long episode featured some of the videos from Teaching Channel's website.
