= Social pedagogy =

Academic discipline

Social pedagogy describes a holistic and relationship-centred way of working in care and educational settings with people across the course of their lives. In many countries across Europe (and increasingly beyond), it has a long-standing tradition as a field of practice and academic discipline concerned with addressing social inequality and facilitating social change by nurturing learning, well-being and connection both at an individual and community level. The term 'pedagogy' originates from the Greek pais (child) and agein (to bring up, or lead), with the prefix 'social' emphasising that upbringing is not only the responsibility of parents but a shared responsibility of society. Social pedagogy has therefore evolved in somewhat different ways in different countries and reflects cultural and societal norms, attitudes and notions of education and upbringing, of the relationship between the individual and society, and of social welfare provision for its marginalised members. Social pedagogues (professionals who have completed a qualification in social pedagogy) work within a range of different settings, from early years through adulthood to working with disadvantaged adult groups as well as older people. To achieve a holistic perspective within each of these settings, social pedagogy draws together theories and concepts from related disciplines such as sociology, psychology, education, philosophy, medical sciences, and social work.

== Methods ==
Hämäläinen points out that social pedagogy is not a method or a set of methods, but that any method is chosen based on social pedagogical considerations. In the past 3 main methods were defined:

1. Individual casework – to improve/develop individual life circumstances,
2. Social group work – to develop social competencies,
3. Community intervention work – to develop social demographic structures.

After 1970 a lot of different methods derived from those three. In practice a mono-methodical approach can be barely found; approaches/ concepts of action predominate which include more than the three classic methods.

== Principles ==
Social pedagogy is based on humanistic values that stress human dignity, mutual respect, trust, unconditional appreciation, and equality, to mention but a few. It is underpinned by a fundamental concept of children, young people, and adults as equal human beings with rich and extraordinary potential and considers them competent, resourceful, and active agents.

In their earlier work on social pedagogy, Petrie et al. identify 9 principles underpinning social pedagogy:

- "A focus on the child as a whole person and support for the child’s overall development;
- The practitioner seeing herself/himself as a person in relationship with the child or young person;
- Children and staff are seen as inhabiting the same life space, not as existing in separate hierarchical domains;
- As professionals, pedagogues are encouraged constantly to reflect on their practice and to apply both theoretical understandings and self-knowledge to the sometimes challenging demands with which they are confronted;
- Pedagogues are also practical, so their training prepares them to share in many aspects of children’s daily lives and activities;
- Children’s associative life is seen as an important resource: workers should foster and make use of the group;
- Pedagogy builds on an understanding of children’s rights that is not limited to procedural matters or legislated requirements;
- There is an emphasis on teamwork and on valuing the contribution of others in 'bringing up' children: other professionals, members of the local community, and, especially, parents.
- The centrality of relationship and, allied to this, the importance of listening and communicating."

Eichsteller & Holthoff suggest that social pedagogy aims to achieve:

- Holistic education – education of head (cognitive knowledge), heart (emotional and spiritual learning), and hands (practical and physical skills);
- Holistic well-being – strengthening health-sustaining factors and providing support for people to enjoy a long-lasting feeling of happiness;
- To enable children, young people as well as adults to empower themselves and be self-responsible persons who take responsibility for their society;
- To promote human welfare and prevent or ease social problems.

They go on to describe social pedagogical practice as a holistic process creating a balance between:

- the professional: (theory and concepts, reflective practitioner – the ‘head’)
- the personal: (using one's personality, positive attitude, building personal relationships, but keeping the ‘private’ out – the ‘heart’)
- the practical: (using certain methods and creative activities – the ‘hands’)

All three elements are equal and complement each other, thus generating synergy.

== Historic development ==
Although pedagogy varies across European countries, similar roots have developed into differing strands of contemporary pedagogy thinking. Hämäläinen explains that “historically, social pedagogy is based on the belief that you can decisively influence social circumstances through education” – and importantly, education is seen as a lifelong learning process that does not only refer to children but includes educating adults, for instance to change their idea of children.
While philosophers of Classical antiquity like Plato and Aristotle discussed how education could contribute to social development, social pedagogy in theory and practice only emerged through the influence of modern thinking in the Renaissance, the Reformation and later during the Enlightenment, when children started to come into the picture of social philosophy.

=== Jean-Jacques Rousseau ===
A major impetus for the current understanding of pedagogy was the educational philosophy of the Swiss social thinker Jean-Jacques Rousseau (1712–1778). Concerned with the decay of society, he developed his theories based on his belief that human beings were inherently good as they were closest to nature when born, but society and its institutions corrupted them and denaturalized them. Consequently, bringing up children in harmony with nature and its laws so as to preserve the good was central for Rousseau's pedagogic theory. Rousseau innovatively “argued that the momentum for learning was provided by the growth of the person (nature) – and that what the educator needed to do was to facilitate learning opportunities,” as Doyle and Smith note.

=== New Education Movement ===
Pestalozzi's ideas sparked interest across continental Europe, and particularly the New Education Movement transferred his pedagogic concept into various settings, such as kindergarten (Fröbel), school (Montessori, Steiner, Hahn), residential care (Korczak), and informal work with children and young people (Montessori). Thus the New Education Movement contributed to a continental pedagogic discourse, which saw children being conceptualised as equal human beings ("Children do not become humans, they already are", Korczak), and as competent, active agents ("A child has a hundred languages", Malaguzzi). Furthermore, there was increasing recognition for child participation and children's rights, for instance in the pedagogic concepts of Montessori and Korczak.
The New Education Movement led to a spread of pedagogic concepts and ideas across many European countries and made two fundamental points which demonstrate its ambition to use pedagogy for social change: “First, in all education the personality of the child is an essential concern; second, education must make for human betterment, that is for a New Era”.

=== Alleviating poverty ===
Based on the educational ideas of Rousseau, Pestalozzi and Fröbel, the German headteacher Friedrich Diesterweg (1790—1866) emphasised the social relevance of pedagogy in fighting social inequalities. For him social pedagogy was "educational action by which one aims to help the poor in society". Through the contribution of Diesterweg and other thinkers, such as Friedrich Schleiermacher, pedagogy took on a more social role, one of community education that also occurs in later writers like Paulo Freire and John Dewey.
Although pedagogy was early on concerned with changing social conditions through education – Rousseau is most famous for his Social Contract (1762) – its primary focus had been on the individual and his or her upbringing, which Rousseau had aimed to protect from the negative influences of society. Pedagogic thinkers like Pestalozzi and later on Montessori followed in his tradition of developing a child-centered pedagogy, which was increasingly criticised by an emerging school of thought that promoted a pedagogy focused on the collective, on the community and how to use pedagogic ideas for social betterment – or a social pedagogy, as the German educationalist Karl Mager had written in 1844 for the first time.

=== Social pedagogy ===
One of the first key thinkers, Paul Natorp, “claimed that all pedagogy should be social, that is, that in the philosophy of education the interaction of educational processes and society must be taken into consideration”. His social pedagogic theories were influenced by Plato’s doctrine of ideas, together with Immanuel Kant’s categorical imperative of treating people as subjects in their own rights instead of treating them as means to an end, and Pestalozzi’s method.
In the 1920s, with influential educationalists such as Herman Nohl, German social pedagogy was interpreted from a hermeneutical perspective, which acknowledged that an individual’s life and their problems can only be understood through their eyes and in their social context, by understanding how the individual interacts with their social environment.
Following World War II and the experiences within National Socialism that exposed the dangers of collective education in the hands of a totalitarian state, social pedagogy “became more critical, revealing a critical attitude towards society and taking the structural factors of society that produce social suffering into consideration”. Consequently, contemporary social pedagogy in Germany is as a discipline linked more closely to social work and sociology than to psychology.

== By country ==
=== United States ===
In the United States, Arizona State University's School of Social Transformation offers a master of arts degree in social and cultural pedagogy. The 30-unit program requires 10 three-credit courses. The core courses (9 credits) include Foundations of Social Transformation, Research Methods, and Social and Cultural Pedagogy: Theoretical and Practical Issues. Students complete five elective courses (15 credits) and then either a thesis or a capstone project (6 credits). The program develops students' capacity to analyze non-formal education policies and practices and examine the educational impact of a range of institutions, organizations and associational spaces. It provides training and skills for work in settings such as: adult education, community organizing, literacy programs, museum education, dis/ability programs, youth and sports programs, peace education, environmental education, religious organizations, health education, civic education, Indigenous and tribal communities, for-the-job and on-the-job training. There is also a professional organization, the Social Pedagogy Association (SPA), which was established as a 501(c)3 nonprofit in 2016 by graduates of the social and cultural pedagogy masters program at ASU. The goal of SPA is to encourage and track the growth of social pedagogy in the United States.

=== United Kingdom ===
Various qualifications are now available in the UK, ranging from a Level 3 qualification to BA programmes to a master's degree. Since February 2017 the Social Pedagogy Professional Association has acted as a professional home for social pedagogy in the UK.

=== Taiwan ===
In Taiwan, National Taiwan Normal University offers the only Department of Social Education (known as "Adult and Continuing Education"), providing academic programs from bachelor's to master's and doctoral degrees.

== See also ==
- Theatre pedagogy
- Free school movement
