= VideoLectures.net =

The website's logo

VideoLectures.NET is the world's biggest academic online video repository with 24,792 video lectures delivered by 10,763 presenters since 2001. It is hosted at Jozef Stefan Institute in Slovenia, Europe. All content is released under the Creative Commons Attribution-Noncommercial-No Derivative Works 3.0

== Content ==
The vast majority of the content is about computer science, specifically about data mining, semantic web, machine learning, and complex systems coming from conferences around the world such as ICML, NIPS, ECML PKDD, SIGKDD. The content is mainly Ph.D. level and peer reviewed by a conference editorial board.

It also includes content from the "Video Journal of Machine Learning Abstracts" which are being connected to the PASCAL NoE project and Planetdata on big data.

It hosts also additional free content from the open learning incentives, such as MIT OpenCourseWare.

It serves as a main data source for the STReP's "transLectures" project the goal of which is to develop automatic large scale machine translations.

== Awards ==
- 2009 UNESCO "WSIS" World Summit Award (WSA) 2009 - Videolectures.net as one of the most outstanding examples of creative and innovative e-Content in the world in "e-science and technology"
- 2013 UNESCO "WSIS + 10 Global Champions" award for the best product of the decade in the "e-science and technology" category

== History ==
In September 2000, the project started with offering online access to video recordings of weekly Solomon seminars held at the Jožef Stefan Institute's Department for Knowledge Technologies. Project Videolectures.net was created/founded by Sebastjan Mislej under patronage of Marko Grobelnik. First team members were: Nina Rančič, Darko Ignjatovic, Davor Orlič. In 2006 Peter Keše, as a developer joined the team.

== See also ==
- Opencast Matterhorn
- TED talks
