= Tbh =

American anonymous social media app

tbh
- Original authors: Nikita Bier, Erik Hazzard, Kyle Zaragoza, and Nicolas Ducdodon (Midnight Labs LLC)
- Developer: Meta Platforms
- Release: August 3, 2017; 9 years ago
- Operating system: iOS
- Successor: Gas
- Size: 77.7 MB (iOS)
- Available in: English
- License: Freeware
- Website: tbhtime.co at the Wayback Machine (archived March 27, 2018)

tbh was an anonymous social media app available in the United States, designed for high school students. The app was launched by Nikita Bier, Erik Hazzard, Kyle Zaragoza, and Nicolas Ducdodon in September 2017. Investors included Greylock Partners, Redpoint Ventures, Founders Fund, Semyon Dukach, Bee Partners, Dorm Room Fund, and American investor Wayne Chang.

== History ==
In October 2017, tbh was ranked #1 in the U.S. App Store, and Meta Platforms (then known as Facebook inc.) subsequently acquired the company for an estimated $100 million. tbh became one of the company's brands, alongside Facebook (app), WhatsApp, Instagram, Messenger, and Oculus VR. However, on July 2, 2018, Facebook announced that tbh would be discontinued, due to low usage.

In August 2018, BuzzFeed News acquired a confidential memo in which the app's founders explained how they used Instagram to target teenagers at specific schools, playing to their curiosity and timing their messages to take advantage of the end of the school day.

In August 2022, tbh was relaunched as Gas by co-creator Nikita Bier, with the same concept of being an anonymous social media app, in which high school students give each other compliments; this was acquired by Discord in early 2023.

== See also ==
- Whisper
- Yik Yak
