= Sarahah =

Saudi Arabian website and mobile app

- Website type: Animated cards (iOS and Android apps)
- Available in: 2 languages
- Founded: November 2016; 10 years ago
- Headquarters: Saudi Arabia
- Area served: Worldwide
- Founder: Zain-Alabdin Tawfiq
- Industry: Internet
- Website: www.sarahah.com
- Advertising: Yes
- Registration: None
- Users: 300 million+ registered accounts (2018)
- Current status: Active

Sarahah (Arabic: صراحة, romanized: ṣarāḥa) is a Saudi Arabian website and mobile app. In Arabic, sarahah means "frankness" or "honesty". It launched in 2016 as a social networking service for anonymous feedback, and by February 2018 more than 300 million accounts had been created. The messaging service closed in 2021. Sarahah now offers Sarahah Cards, iOS and Android apps for sending animated cards that open on its website.

Sarahah allowed people to text messages to others and the person reading that could then reply anonymously. Initially, it was meant for workers to compliment their bosses. Spam was frequent, sent by third-party apps claiming to be able to reveal the usernames of anonymous senders.

== History ==
It was created by Zain-Alabdin Tawfiq at the end of 2016 and reached a sudden worldwide success by mid-2017. This growth is considered to be deeply related with the release of a Snapchat update that allowed people to share URLs on their snaps.

It was released on the US Apple App Store on 13 June 2017, and also had users in several other countries including Canada, India, and Lebanon. An update was released by Snapchat on July 5. Within two weeks, it was at the number 1 position. The rise was also seen in a Google Trends report.

On 26 August 2017, it was reported that the Sarahah mobile app quietly uploads the user's address book to its web servers.

On 12 January 2018, Katrina Collins, after friends of her 13-year-old daughter sent her abusive messages, started a petition to have the app banned. The petition gained nearly 470,000 supporters. Both Apple and Google had removed the app from their stores.

In 2019, Sarahah launched an iOS app called Enoff (pronounced “enough”), intended for anonymous reporting of workplace issues.

Sarahah announced the closure of its messaging platform in December 2021.

== Current platform ==
In November 2026, Sarahah released Sarahah Cards apps for iOS and Android. Users write an animated card, send it as a link, and can see when the recipient opens it or reacts with a heart.

== See also ==
- Anonymous social media
- Ask.fm – a service which used to be anonymous, and was linked to several teen suicides in 2013
- Secret (app) – a similar service which was shut down in 2015
