= Gas (app) =

Defunct anonymous social media app oriented towards adolescents

- Other names: Gas App, Melt (former), Crush (former)
- Original authors: Nikita Bier, Isaiah Turner, Dave Schatz, Michael Gutierrez
- Developer: Discord
- Release: August 29, 2022
- Final release: 1.6.5 / December 7, 2022
- Operating system: iOS
- Predecessor: tbh
- Size: 105.6 MB (iOS)
- Available in: English
- Website: gasapp.co at the Wayback Machine (archived October 29, 2022)

Gas (sometimes stylized in all caps), formerly known as Melt as well as Crush, was an American anonymous social media app. Launched in August 2022, the app was oriented towards high schoolers. The app was developed by Nikita Bier, Isaiah Turner, and former Facebook engineer Dave Schatz.

Gas was largely based upon the prior tbh app developed by co-founder Nikita Bier, along with Erik Hazzard, Kyle Zaragoza, and Nicolas Ducdodon in September 2017. tbh was acquired by Facebook Inc. (now Meta Platforms) on October 16, 2017, and nearly a year later in July 2018 was dissolved, owing to low usage.

Gas follows a similar purpose to tbh in being a social media app oriented towards high schoolers. In the app, users participate in anonymous polls regarding pre-written complimentary statements to their peers, such as "I'd say yes if (blank) asked me out on a date," "I think (blank) is the coolest kid in school," or "would make an ugly face and still look pretty." Winners of said polls receive a "flame." The name of the app is derived from this, with "gassing someone up" being Gen Z slang for complimenting someone. Users can pay a $6.99 subscription that enables "God Mode," which shows hints regarding who voted for them in a poll.

Gas overtook TikTok and BeReal as the most downloaded app on the Apple App Store in October 2022 (the app is currently not available for Android). The app has over 5.1 million downloads as of early November 2022, over a million active users and 300 thousand daily downloads in October 2022.

On January 17, 2023, Gas was acquired by Discord, however it would remain a standalone app and its developers became Discord staff members.

On October 18, 2023, Discord announced that service for Gas would be permanently ending effective November 7, 2023, due to a steep decline in users. Effective November 7, the app became completely unusable.

== Claims of human-trafficking ==
Beginning in October 2022, rumors spread largely throughout TikTok and Snapchat alleged that the app was linked to human trafficking (in particular sex trafficking). According to Bier, the rumor originated with a single user review from China on October 5, and then was disseminated through TikTok accounts with "few to no US teen followers."

Although largely dismissed as a hoax by experts, who cite how the app doesn't log user locations and general anonymity, the hoax became pervasive to the extent that various police departments, school systems, and local news outlets began issuing warnings regarding the app. For instance, on October 31, 2022, the police department of Piedmont, Oklahoma issued a warning to parents, encouraging them to check their children's phones, while on November 3, Oklahoma' Oktaha Public School system stated in a Facebook post that "Children are being kidnapped in other towns and this new app is thought to be the source of predators finding their location". Both statements have since been retracted by Police Chief Scott Singer and Superintendent Jerry Needham. Local medial outlets such as KOCO in Oklahoma City ran stories making similar statements.

The rumor had a negative impact on the app, with downloads plateauing for a two-week period in late October and with 3% of users in a single day reportedly uninstalling the app. Revenue and ratings reportedly dropped and the company's social media accounts were bombarded with comments labeling them as sex-traffickers. The four-person development team reportedly received online death threats.

== See also ==
- Yik Yak
