= Yo (app) =

Smartphone app

- Developer: Or Arbel
- Release: April 1, 2014; 12 years ago
- Operating system: iOS, Android
- Website: justyo.co

Yo was a social mobile application for iOS, Android, and formerly also Windows Phone. Initially, the application's only function was to send the user's friends the word "yo" as a text and audio notification, but was then updated to enable users to attach links and location to their "Yo"s.

== History ==
Yo was created by Israeli developer Or Arbel in eight hours at the request of Moshe Hogeg, CEO of Mobli, who asked Arbel to design a single-button app to send a notification to his assistant or wife. It was launched on April Fools' Day 2014 for Android and iOS, though initially rejected by Apple for being too simple. The app was only shared with Mobli employees to start, however 20,000 people were using the app within the first month of release. The app was shared on the Product Hunt website, through which it exploded in popularity. Following a wide range of interest from investors, the app received US$1 million in investment, including from Hogeg himself.

In July 2014 the app was also released for Windows Phone. The app was valued at between $5 and $10 million in the same month and received a further $1.5 million in funding.

Arbel stated interest in expanding the app to include more functionality, including a possible feature which could be used by bloggers to send their followers a "yo" with a link to the blog attached whenever they post an update; the feature has since been implemented. The app's first content update was released in August 2014, adding extra functionality to it, including the ability to send web links and hashtags, and creating user profiles.

On 20 June 2014, Isaiah Turner hacked the app, allowing him to retrieve any user's phone number and spam or spoof "yos" to any user. After the exploit was fixed, Arbel hired him to work for the company. In October of the same year, the app introduced functionality to enable users to send their location to other users.

In June 2015, Yo released the second version of their app with a number of new features. The user interface was updated to allow users to send photos or their location within 1 swipe and a tap from the home screen. The new version also enabled users to collect their friends into groups so that they could "Yo" a number of people with 1 tap.

In 2016 the Yo company shut down. Arbel and other employees had since moved on to other jobs, and Arbel described the app as running on "autopilot". Arbel opened a Patreon account to continue funding maintenance of the app in 2018.

== Features ==
The app enabled users to send individual notifications to other users, simply containing the word "Yo". Users could additionally send their location. Yo was an option for the IFTTT service.

The app had an API, which enabled developers and brands to send a Yo to groups of users, such as when the World Cup sent a Yo every time a goal was scored. FedEx set up a service using the app through which users could receive a Yo when their package was being delivered.

== Reception ==
Since its release, Yo has been downloaded over 3 million times and by 2019 over 100 million 'Yo's had been sent. Joachim Fels, an economist at Morgan Stanley, expressed interest in the app due to its simplicity. At the height of its popularity the app reached the number 4 position on the iOS App Store and #1 in the social networking category.

== Similar apps ==
A number of apps inspired by Yo have been released, including one which sends the word 'Hodor', and one which sends the Indian word 'aiyo'. The app has also been adapted to warn Israeli citizens of missile strikes. An app called Lo was partly inspired by Yo, sending only a user's location. In July 2014 some of the copies and parodies received copyright complaints from Yo, with Arbel saying "Yo has spawned many clones... some of them are a complete replication of the Yo app... Improving upon our concept is welcomed, copying us bit-by-bit isn't.". In August 2014, Tom Scott and Natalie Gray created Emojli, an emoji only messenger app, partly inspired by the success of Yo.

For a subplot in season two of the HBO show Silicon Valley HBO reportedly built a prototype of the featured Bro app, an app just like Yo, "but less original".
