= Dog shaming =

Internet meme

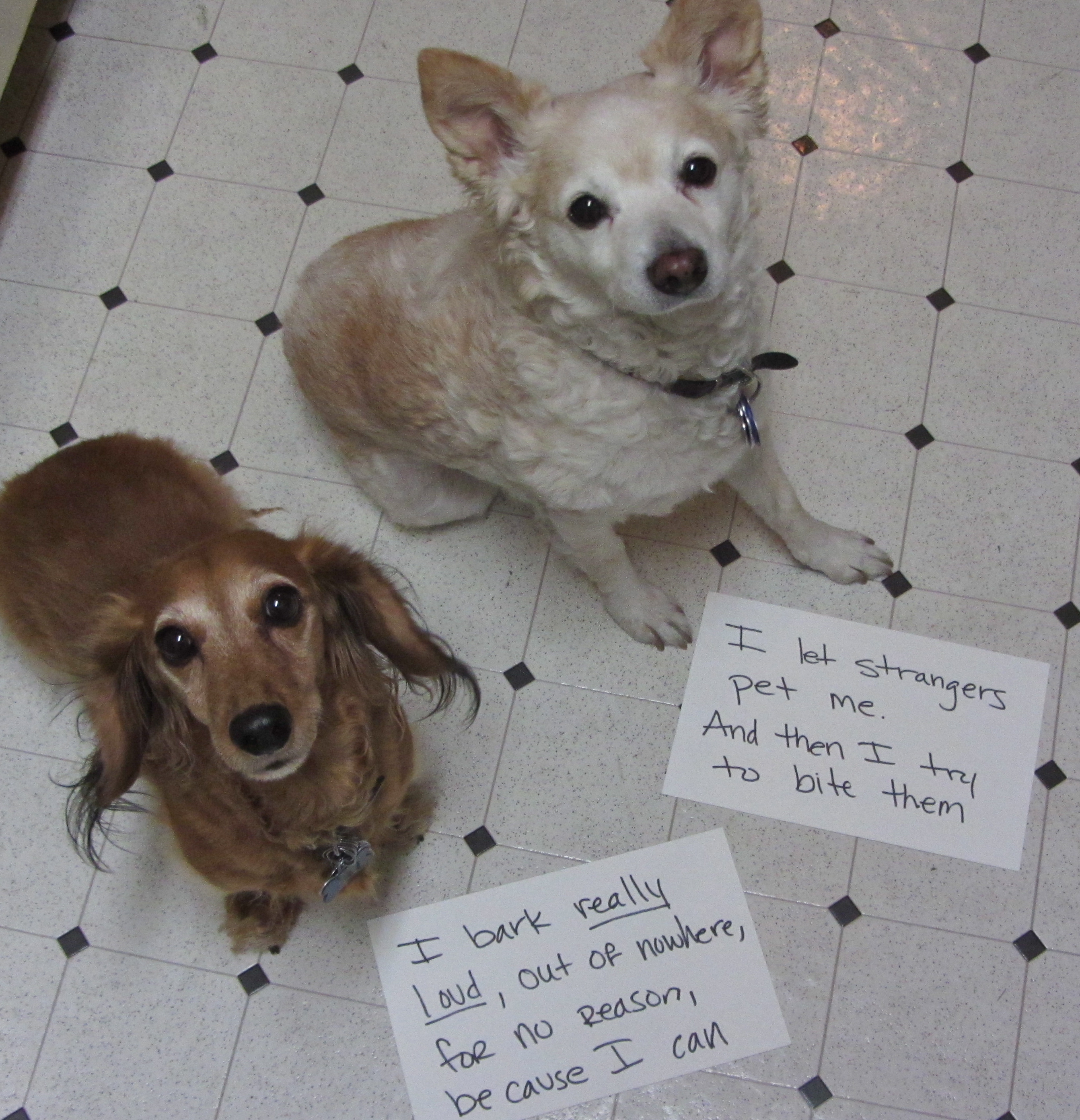
An example of dog shaming

Dog shaming, also known as animal shaming, is an internet meme in which an image of a dog or other animal is uploaded to the internet with a sign which describes some recent negative behaviour perpetrated by the animal. The meme originated on Tumblr in August 2012.

== Description ==
Dog shaming is the name given to the activity where a dog owner creates a sign to describe a negative activity that the dog has participated in. For example, the sign might read "I dug a hole in the carpet". The sign is then either hung around the dog's neck, or placed next to the animal and is photographed and published on the internet. It has been compared to PostSecret, and a viral image of child shaming.

The internet meme originated on the Tumblr page Dogshaming in August 2012. The very first image posted by Pascale Lemire was of her Dachshund who had eaten a pair of underwear. Other animals such as cats have since been featured as early as 2003 from Australia by an unknown source referred to as Maxman. The concept was turned into a Tumblr blog by Chris Mohney, who works as editorial director at Tumblr, using Pascale Lemire's original image along with a handful of other images. He described dog shaming as "a half-baked joke that I didn't think would amount to much beyond a few hours' amusement". It went viral after Mohney added the ability to upload additional images to the site. It was discussed on NBC's Today, with hosts Kathie Lee Gifford and Hoda Kotb thinking that it was funny, but Matt Lauer and Savannah Guthrie disagreeing. A video called "The Ultimate Dog Shaming," released on YouTube on October 7, 2012, gained national attention for its depiction of a beagle named Maymo being dog-shamed for hoarding water jugs and destroying an antique stuffed panda bear, among other things.

Celebrities have subsequently posted or tweeted dog shaming images of their own pets, including Wil Wheaton, and Lauren Conrad, whose puppy had chewed up one of her shoes.

On September 24, 2013, author Pascale Lemire released the book Dog Shaming. Mohney turned over the online assets of Dogshaming to Lemire, the original creator, in August 2012, allowing her to run the site her original image helped create; Lemire stated in at least one interview that she is the sole owner of the dogshaming.com website.
