= Silicon Beach =

Technology hub in California, US

Coordinates: 33.9764°N 118.4512°W

Silicon Beach is the Westside region of the Los Angeles metropolitan area that is home to more than 500 technology companies, including startups. It is particularly applied to the coastal strip from Los Angeles International Airport north to the Santa Monica Mountains, but the term may be applied loosely or colloquially to most anywhere in the Los Angeles Basin. Startups seeded here include Snapchat and Tinder. Major technology companies that opened offices in the region including Google, Yahoo!, YouTube, BuzzFeed, Facebook, Salesforce, AOL, Electronic Arts, Roku, Sony, EdgeCast Networks, MySpace, Amazon.com, Apple, Inc., and Netflix. By some 2012 metrics, the region was the second or third-most prominent technology hub in the world. In the first six months of 2013, 94 new start-ups in Silicon Beach raised over $500 million in funding, and there were nine acquisitions.

The area offers relatively easy access to Los Angeles International Airport, the biggest and most connected airport in western North America.

As in the San Francisco Bay Area, the influx of technology companies has boosted home and office rents and real estate prices in Playa Vista, Playa Del Rey, Westchester, Santa Monica, and Venice, already high previously due to beachfront location. The effects are also spilling over into Marina del Rey and Hermosa Beach.

Start-up pockets have also emerged in nearby Culver City, West L.A., and El Segundo. Other pockets include Downtown Los Angeles, Beverly Hills, Hollywood, Glendale, and the San Fernando Valley. The tendency of companies to congregate in these centrally located, high income areas has raised concerns about the feasibility of racial minorities joining the workforce, as they tend to live in further outlying areas.

Silicon Beach is also home to start-up incubators and accelerators, such as Amplify.LA, Science, Disney Accelerator, TechStars, and Cedars Sinai.

The Los Angeles metro area was home to 88,000 engineers in 2021, the highest number of any metro area in the United States. Higher education institutions in Los Angeles County graduate 6,600 engineering majors a year, the highest of any county in the United States.

Higher education institutions headquartered in Silicon Beach include Loyola Marymount University and Otis College of Art and Design. Other higher education institutions in the nearby Southern California region or with satellite campuses in/nearby Silicon Beach include: Pepperdine University, Santa Monica College, Art Center College of Design, California Institute of Technology, University of California Los Angeles, University of Southern California, Occidental College, Cal State L. A., Cal State Northridge, Cal State Long Beach, Cal State Dominguez Hills, Cal Poly Pomona, and the Claremont Colleges.

== List of technology companies based in Silicon Beach ==
Company	Year founded	Industry	Valuation
Abstract	2020	Govtech	
AdColony	2011	Adtech	Acquired by Opera for $350 million
Age of Learning	2007	Education	
Bitium	2012	Cloud Computing	Acquired by Google for an unknown amount
Branded Online	2010	Ecommerce & Online Marketing Agency	
Cornerstone OnDemand	1992	Cloud	
Distillery	2008	Mobile Application Development, UX/UI	
Dollar Shave Club	2011	Consumer packaged goods	Acquired by Unilever for $1 billion
Eaze	2014	Cannabis	
Enplug	2012	Software	$2.5 million
Fair	2016	Automotive, Fintech	
Falcon Computing Solutions	2014	High Performance Computing, FPGA acceleration - tools and solutions	
Flexport	2013	Digital Freight Forwarding	
FloQast	2013	Accounting Software	
Flustr	2019	Consumer Tech, Entertainment	
Fullscreen	2011	Digital Media	
Gnarbox	2014	Consumer electronics	
GOAT	2015	e-commerce, Fashion (sneakers)	
Headspace	2010	Health	
HelenHealth (ZB Technologies, Inc.)	2016	Digital Health	
The Honest Company	2012	e-commerce	
Honey	2012	Cashback website, online coupons	Acquired by PayPal in 2020 for $4 billion
Hulu	2007	Television Streaming Services	$15.8 billion
Hyperloop One	2014	Transportation	
LegalZoom	1999	Legal	
Libermans Co	2021	Investments	$400 million
MatchCraft	1998	Digital Marketing Platform Technology & Services	
mayk.it	2020	AI Music Technology	
Metropolis Technologies	2017	Parking and artificial intelligence company	
MuteSix	2014	Performance Marketing Agency	
Nasty Gal	2006	Retail	Unknown - Chapter 11
Oculus VR	2012	Virtual reality	Acquired by Facebook, Inc. in 2014 for $2 billion
Onestop Internet	2004	Full Service Ecommerce Agency	
Ring	2012	Home Security Devices	Acquired by Amazon for $1 billion
Riot Games	2006	Video Games	
Science 37	2014	Medical technology	
Scopely	2011	Video Games	$1.7 billion
ServiceTitan	2012	Software technology platform	$8.3 billion
Snail Games	2000	Video Games	
Snap Inc.	2011	Social media	$23 billion
Swagbucks	2007	Digital Rewards & Cash Back	
Tala	2011	Fintech	
Thrive Market	2013	e-commerce	
TI Health	2010	Data and Analytics, Healthcare Digital Marketing	
TigerConnect	2010	Messaging, Text Analytics, Communications Infrastructure	$625 million
Tinder	2012	Social Media	
TrueCar	2005	Automotive websites	$1.65 billion
Wag	2014	Pets	
WebJoint	2014	Cannabis	
Whisper	2012	Social media	
Wpromote	2001	Digital Marketing Agency	
.xyz	2014	Internet Domain Registry	
ZestFinance	2009	Fintech	
ZipRecruiter	2010	Hiring	

== Other uses ==
- 1983: PC Magazine reported that "some people are starting to call" Boca Raton, Florida—where IBM had developed its Personal Computer, and other technology companies had facilities—"Silicon Beach, in deference to the great valley of the West".
- 1984: Silicon Beach Software was formed in San Diego, California.
- 2008: Silicon Beach Australia was used to describe the country's tech industry, including startup hubs in Sydney, Melbourne, Brisbane, and Perth.
