= Tellonym =

Messaging app

Logo

Tellonym (from English "to tell" and German "anonym") is a cross-platform messaging app to have questions answered. Tellonym was created as a means to give and receive anonymous feedback. Developed by German software company Callosum Software, the app's userbase is predominantly German.

== History ==
Comparable projects were started with ask.fm in 2010, while the competitor Sarahah from Saudi Arabia also started in 2016. The Tellonym project started in April 2016. 700,000 users registered in May 2017. By June 2018, 2 million users had registered. As of June 2020, the Google App Store indicates more than 10 million registrations. According to the surveys of the Youth Internet Monitor 2018 in Austria, 12 percent of 11 to 17-year-olds use the App.

== Technology ==
Messages on Tellonym are called "tells." A user's profile consists of a username, a short description, and an emoji, which can be obtained at events or purchased. The profile is used to gather feedback about oneself, work, and any other questions. As a result, Tellonym can be used as a survey tool. Complete strangers, in addition to friends, can access the personal profile via a public link and leave comments. This facilitates the posting of hurtful or annoying comments. It is not necessary to have your own profile, where you would have to provide your name or e-mail address, in order to rate other users.

Callosum Software retains messages and end-device IP addresses for possible transmission to criminal authorities. The app lets you create a user-based word filter with a maximum of ten words that prevents "tells" containing the listed words from reaching the user. In practice, this word filter is ineffective because it can be bypassed by exchanging single letters. A timer function can be used to schedule when the message will be sent.

== Cyber-bullying threats ==
Because users can create tells anonymously, it is easier for them to insult or harass others, which can lead to cyberbullying. Tellonym frequently contains "drastic insults or even incitements to suicide."

== See also ==
- Social media
- Formspring
- Ask.fm
