= Nikita Bier =

American entrepreneur

- Education: University of California, Berkeley
- Occupations: Entrepreneur, product manager
- Employer: None
- Known for: Co-founding tbh and Gas

Nikita Bier is an American entrepreneur and product manager known for developing social networking applications, including tbh, Gas, and formerly of X (formerly Twitter).

Bier's tenure at X (formerly Twitter) officially ended on October 2nd, 2026.

== Early life and education ==
Bier was born in the United States, raised in a Jewish Ukrainian family in the Los Angeles area. Bier attended the University of California, Berkeley, where he developed early projects including a political analysis application called Politify.

== Career ==
=== tbh ===
tbh, which Bier co-founded with Erik Hazzard, Kyle Zaragoza and Nicolas Ducdodon in 2017, was acquired by Facebook on 16 October 2017, about two months after launch. The San Francisco Standard later reported the sale price as about $30 million. Facebook shut tbh down in July 2018, citing low usage.

=== Gas ===
Gas, an anonymous compliments app, was based on the earlier tbh concept and was acquired by Discord on 17 January 2023, remaining a standalone app with its developers joining Discord's staff. Discord announced on 19 October 2023, nine months after the acquisition, that it would shut Gas down on 7 November 2023.

=== Explode ===
Bier launched Explode in January 2025. The app was criticized for showing promotional material in iOS live activities which is against Apple's guidelines.

=== X (formerly Twitter) ===
In July 2025, Bier was appointed Head of Product at X, the social media platform owned by xAI (now SpaceXAI). His appointment was viewed as part of broader efforts to drive user growth and product innovation on the platform. In August of 2026, Bier announced he would step down from the position, continuing as an advisor, with his former role being succeeded by Benji Taylor, Jonah Katz and Mridul Singhai respectively internally while a replacement could be found.

On October 2nd, 2026, Bier confirmed, via a post on X (formerly Twitter), that his time at the social network had officially ended, as access to the X provided laptop had been "disconnected."

== Products ==
- tbh (2017)
- Gas (2022)
