= Isaiah Turner (entrepreneur) =

American Internet entrepreneur

- Born: August 7, 1998 (age 28)
- Citizenship: United States
- Education: St. Mary's Ryken High School
- Occupations: Entrepreneur; engineer
- Known for: Co-founder of Monkey (2016); Yo hacker (2014)
- Website: Official website

Isaiah Turner (born August 7, 1998) is an American Internet entrepreneur and software engineer. He is known as the co-founder of the mobile apps Monkey, Poparazzi, and Gas.

In 2017, Turner was included in Crain's New York Business Magazine '20 Under 20' list as a breakout tech entrepreneur.

== Early life ==
In 2014, Isaiah was selected by Apple as one of about 200 students in the world to receive an Apple Worldwide Developers Conference Student Scholarship. This included free attendance at Apple's San Francisco, California, event.

On June 19, 2014, Isaiah hacked Yo after the app exploded in popularity and raised over $1.5 million in venture capital financing. He sent the following push notification to Yo's users which caused the hashtag "#YoBeenHacked" to appear on Twitter's trending topics list.

wow. many 1337. such bad security.

I hacked Yo. Use hashtag #YoBeenHacked to talk about it.

Or Arbel, developer of Yo, hired Isaiah Turner to fix the app's security flaws. At the time, Isaiah was 15 years old and still in school.

Following his time at Yo, Isaiah was recruited by a lunch delivery service, MunchQuick. The Washington, DC–based startup company raised $50,000 in seed funding and launched on June 30, 2014.

== Career ==
Isaiah is the co-founder of Monkey. He started the company with his friend, Ben Pasternak. They created Monkey in response to their dissatisfaction with existing social media services. Monkey, which raised US$2,000,000, was acquired by rival Holla in December, 2017.

Monkey is a video chat based app that has been described as something much like speed dating for friends. Within its first year, Monkey had been used to make over 1 billion calls and received praise from Tim Cook. At the time Monkey was acquired, it had been downloaded more than 3 million times and had over 300,000 monthly active users.

In August 2022, Isaiah co-started Gas, a social-media app where high-school students can anonymously vote in polls, which ranked No. 1 in the App Store.
