= Sidechat =

Social media platform for students

Sidechat is an anonymous social media application for college students. The app requires a student email to post to a school specific community. The format of Sidechat is similar to Reddit and it is only available on iOS.

Sidechat launched early 2022 to a few universities, the app recruited students to help market its launch both in person and online, with some creating Instagram accounts as to promote it. In 2023, Sidechat acquired Yik Yak, which was a similar platform launched in 2013. Fizz, a similar app, has filed a lawsuit in 2023 against Sidechat for unfair competition.

Sidechat has played a role in the 2024 pro-Palestinian protests on university campuses. The moderation of Sidechat is controversial, posts are not filtered before publication. Several universities' administrations have found moderation on the platform to be problematic. Minouche Shafik, President of Columbia University, called the app "poisonous" and said that Sidechat had the "most egregious cases" of "antisemitism, Islamophobia, [and] racist comments" in an April 2024 hearing with the House Committee on Education and the Workforce. Harvard and Brown had called for increased moderation on the platform before the protests.
