= Enplug =

American technology company

Enplug, Inc.
- Type: Private
- Industry: Software
- Founded: May 2012; 14 years ago, in Culver City, California
- Founder: David Zhu; Nanxi Liu; Navdeep Reddy; Zach Spitulski; Alex Ross
- Fate: Acquired (2021)
- Headquarters: Culver City, California, U.S.
- Area served: Worldwide
- Key people: Nanxi Liu (CEO); Tina Denuit-Wojcik (CTO); Navdeep Reddy; (CIO)
- Products: Digital signage
- Website: enplug.com

Enplug, Inc. was an American technology company headquartered in Culver City, California that offered software for digital displays, allowing real-time social media interaction between brands and users. The company was a software licensing business.

Enplug was acquired by Tampa-based Spectrio in 2021.

== History ==
Enplug was part of the emerging Los Angeles startup community, dubbed "Silicon Beach". The company was a graduate of StartEngine, founded by Howard Marks, in September 2012. Since its founding, the company had received awards such as placement on both Inc. Magazine and Forbes 30 Under 30 lists.

In March 2021, the company was acquired by Spectrio, a customer engagement technology company based in Tampa, Florida.

== Funding ==
In April 2014, Enplug raised $2.5 million through seed funding, which came from a number of investors including Larry Keele, co-founder of Oaktree Capital Management; Rasoul Oskouy, founding member of Juniper Networks; Bill Gross, founder of Idealab; Hossein Eslambolchi, former president and CTO at AT&T; David Cohen, Executive Vice President at Interscope Records; Justin Caldbeck, managing director at Lightspeed Venture Partners; Troy Carter, CEO at Atom Factory; Activision co-founder Howard Marks; Amidi Group, DominateFund, and zPark Venture.

== Product ==
Enplug's social media displays allowed end-users to interact with brands in real-time through their existing social media accounts. Enplug displays supported multiple social media apps, including Twitter, Facebook, Yelp, Foursquare, and Instagram using a business's custom hashtag. Enplug's software was flexible, where it wasn't limited to its own use, and allowed customers to customize by installing apps created by third-party developers. The company generated a SDK, where developers could create and sell apps.

The displays also acted as advertising space for partners. Content could be deployed by advertisers to a screen of their choice. Enplug was a SaaS platform, where business owners paid to access its software on a monthly basis.

== Culture ==
Enplug received press coverage in relation to its company culture. In 2013, 12 of the 37 employees lived and worked out of a six-bedroom, three-bathroom Ranch-style house in Bel Air, California.

For most employees, the company paid for "food, rent, and utilities." The Wall Street Journal wrote of Enplug's culture in an article about the company: "Employees and managers meet, work, eat, clean, exercise and sleep in the same space. And while there are occasional uncomfortable moments, such as nudging your boss to do the dishes, companies like Enplug say it is good for professional relationships, saves on rent and travel costs and is often just plain fun." Forbes reported that the purpose of living together was for the employees to "blur the lifestyle divide" between work and living. The culture is very important to Enplug. CEO Nanxi Liu stated, “I actually think the company would have failed if we didn’t live together."
