= PostSecret =

Ongoing community mail art project

Screenshot of PostSecret with an example postcard.

PostSecret is an ongoing community mail art project, created by Frank Warren in 2004, in which people mail their secrets anonymously on a homemade postcard. Selected secrets are then posted on the PostSecret website, or used for PostSecret's books or museum exhibits.

== History ==
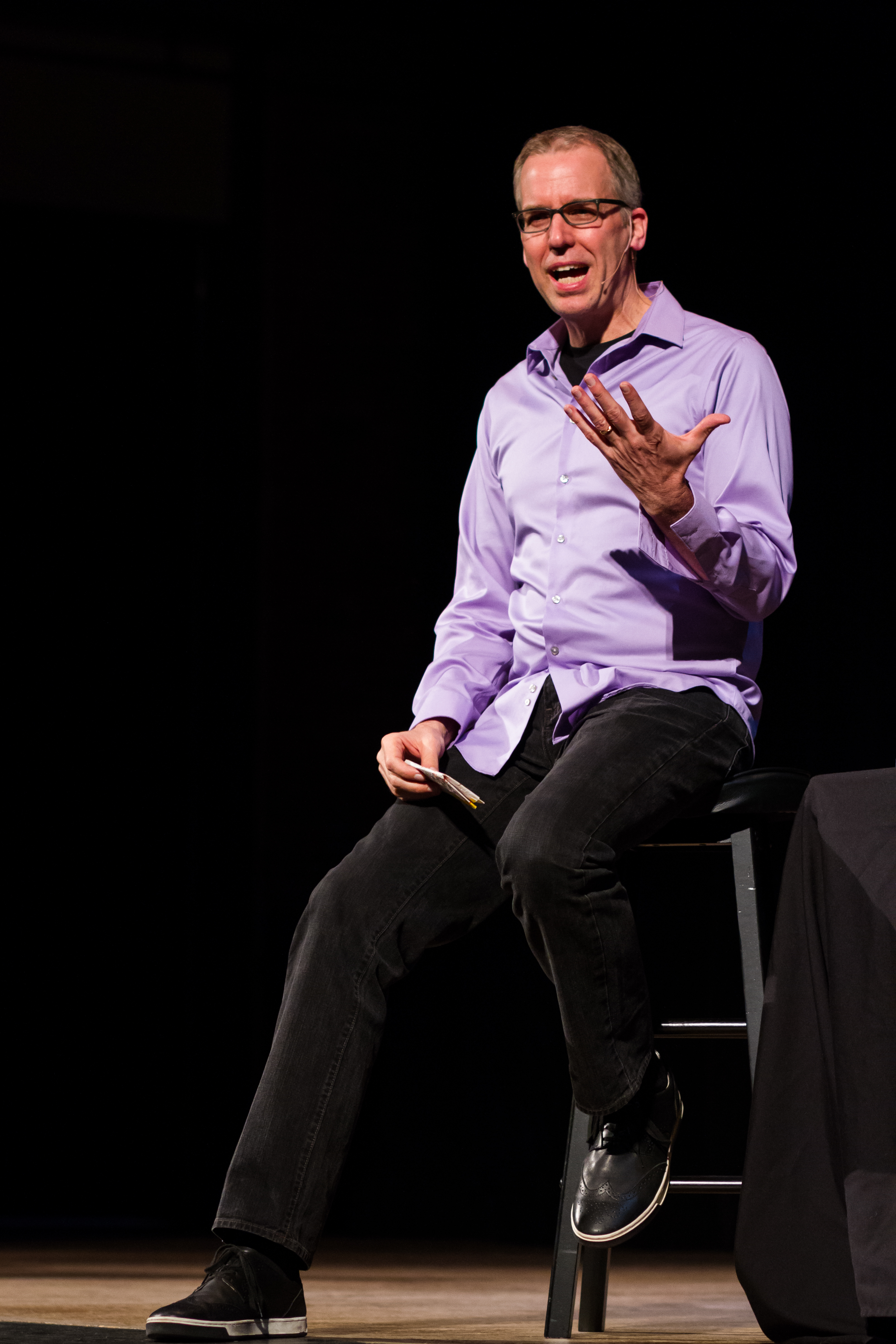
Frank Warren, founder of PostSecret, in 2014

The concept of the project was that completely anonymous people decorate a postcard and portray a secret that they had never previously revealed. No restrictions are made on the content of the secret; only that it must be completely truthful and must never have been spoken before. Entries range from admissions of sexual misconduct and criminal activity to confessions of secret desires, embarrassing habits, hopes and dreams. PostSecret collected and displayed over 2,500 original pieces of art from people across the United States and around the world between its founding on January 1, 2005 and 2007.

The site, which started as an experiment on Blogger, was updated every Sunday with 10 new secrets, all of which share a relatively constant style, giving the artists who participate some guidelines on how their secrets should be represented. From June 24 to July 3, 2007, the "Comments" section of the site was enabled. While a comments feature is frequently present on blogs, it had been previously absent from the PostSecret site. Many visitors felt that the new section contradicted the purpose of the site, as evidenced in numerous comments criticizing a postcard in which the author claims to have fed bleach to her cat. In October 2007, the PostSecret Community was launched. Since its inception, more than 80,000 users have registered for the online discussion forum.

According to Youth Trends' February 2008 "Top Ten List Report" PostSecret was the 10th most popular site among female students in the US, with 7% of those polled naming the site as their favorite.

In April 2008, Warren teamed up with 1-800-suicide to answer some of these anonymous cries for help through peer run crisis hotlines on college campuses.

In April 2011, it was announced that an app would be developed by Bonobo, and released for iPhone and Android later in the year. Launched for iPhone on September 3, 2011, it quickly reached the top-selling spot. Over 2 million secrets were shared over the next few months, but malicious entries became widespread and uncontrollable. The app was removed in December 2011.

Warren hosts events at numerous colleges to speak about the many different secrets of today's society. An art exhibition also travels the country, showcasing many of the hundreds of thousands of secrets he has received. In his book, My Secret, Warren talks about his experiences with encounters with people all around the world who were inspired by the postcards, and how it got many people addressing things that they would otherwise never discuss.

== Breaks from weekly Secrets ==
Since its founding on January 1, 2005, the site has had new weekly Sunday Secrets with very few exceptions. On two occasions, Warren posted a personal video message rather than secrets. On Sunday, August 12, 2007, in lieu of posting secrets, Warren posted the link to a video he had uploaded to YouTube entitled New PostSecret Mini-Movie, expressing his feelings about the project.

On Sunday, September 16, 2007, the traditional PostSecret blog was gone. In its place was a new blog belonging to someone named "Nicole". The real PostSecret had been suddenly and mistakenly shut down, as Blogger thought it was a "spam blog". The error was fixed and Warren's site was put back up with the secrets from September 9.

On October 11, 2009, Warren took a break, posting a video and apology saying that he was busy touring, and urging readers to buy the book PostSecret Confessions on Life, Death and God.

== Controversy ==
=== Comments ===
On February 24, 2008, Warren posted multiple e-mail comments from viewers that attacked various secrets posted that week—notably one from a parent insulting a teacher, one from a call operator insulting a relative of a soldier, and one from a would-be mother insulting a woman desperate not to get pregnant. This revitalized previous discussions on whether or not commenting should be allowed at all on the secrets. While it was noted that sometimes such actions led to others passing judgment on the posters without granting them the opportunity to defend themselves, no action was taken, and the blog continued as normal the next week.

=== Questionable benefit ===
The secrets are meant to be empowering both to the author and to those who read them. Frank Warren claims that the postcards are inspirational to those who read them, have healing powers for those who write them, give hope to people who identify with a stranger's secret, and create an anonymous community of acceptance.

In an article for USA Today, Maria Puente wrote, "Evan Imber-Black, a family therapist and author of The Secret Life of Families, says telling secrets has no meaning except in the context of family relationships. We live in a time where people have the mistaken idea that you tell a secret to the multitudes on TV — and move on. But opening a secret is just the first step. (Posting on PostSecret) might offer some measure of relief, but I'm not sure how long it lasts. When a secret opens, it usually takes time and relational work to get a new equilibrium."

=== App abuse ===
The PostSecret app was released for iOS devices on September 3, 2011. Included in over two million submissions were some indecent, threatening, and abusive ones. During the month of December, volunteer moderators were unable to keep up, despite working 24/7. Warren was contacted by users, Apple, law enforcement and the FBI.

The app was removed from the App Store on December 28, 2011. On January 1, 2012, a formal announcement on the PostSecret website said that the app would not be returning due to its inherent inability to solve the problem of abusive submissions.

=== Murder confession hoax ===
On Saturday, August 31, 2013, the weekly update of Sunday Secrets contained as its first secret a Google map of a geographic area with the words, "I said she dumped me, but, really, I dumped her (body)," accompanied by a red arrow. The disturbing nature of this secret created an uproar in social media. Reddit users were able to pinpoint the location shown as Jackson Park in Chicago, and after making phone calls, the Chicago Police Department sent officers to explore the area. They found nothing, leading to speculation as to whether this secret was genuine. Homicide detectives investigated. On September 3, 2013, the supposed confession was "determined to be not bona fide" and a hoax, according to Chicago police.

== PostSecret Archive ==
PostSecret Archive was a searchable database that allowed users to search all previous PostSecret posts by date or by keyword. It is no longer in operation. An archived version is available.

== Media ==
Artwork from the site was blown up to poster size and used as the background in the 2005 All-American Rejects music video for "Dirty Little Secret." The blown up poster-size PostSecrets, along with thousands of regular size PostSecrets, were then featured in an exhibition with the Washington Project for the Arts.

In the sixth annual Weblog Awards, the PostSecret website received five Bloggies in 2006: Best American Weblog, Best Topical Weblog, Best Community Weblog, Best New Weblog, and Weblog of the Year. In the seventh annual Weblog Awards, the PostSecret website received Weblog of the Year for 2007.

In an episode of CSI: NY, titled "Dead Inside," the murder victim was linked to a website called "SecretsU," where viewers mail in the deepest, darkest secret and turn it into art.

In the CSI: Cyber episode “iWitness”, the murder victim tried to post a photo with a hidden message to a website called “miafina” (Malagasy for ‘secret’) where users post personal confessions.

PostSecret inspired another collaborative art project Snail Mail My Email, where volunteers handwrite strangers' emails and send physical letters to the intended recipients, free of charge.

From August 3, 2015 to September 2017, an exhibit at the National Postal Museum features more than 500 postcards submitted to PostSecret.

== Books ==
To date Warren has published six books compiling submitted secrets, including some which were never posted on the website.

1. PostSecret: Extraordinary Confessions from Ordinary Lives (December 1, 2005) (ISBN 0-06-089919-0)
2. My Secret: A PostSecret Book (October 24, 2006) (ISBN 0-06-119668-1)
3. The Secret Lives of Men and Women: A PostSecret Book (January 9, 2007) (ISBN 0-06-119875-7)
4. A Lifetime of Secrets: A PostSecret Book (October 9, 2007) (ISBN 0-06-123860-0)
5. Confessions on Life, Death, & God (October 6, 2009) (ISBN 0-06-185933-8)
6. The World of PostSecret (November 4, 2014) (ISBN 0-06-233901-X)

Warren has stated that he includes a secret of his own in each of the PostSecret books. His "secret" is not anonymous like most; rather, Warren signs his. For example: "Sometimes when we think we are keeping a secret, that secret is actually keeping us. -Frank"

PostSecret has also contributed secrets as the foreword of The Educator's Guide to LGBT+ Inclusion

== International versions ==
- With permission from Warren, a French version of PostSecret was launched in October 2007 under the name "PostSecretFrance".
- In February 2008, an official German version was started, called "PostSecret auf Deutsch".
- In April 2010 a Portuguese version was launched as "PostSecretPT".
- "Los Secretos Dominicales" is a Spanish version of the original PostSecret.
- A Chinese version, under the name "PostSecretChina", is also available, but is not officially affiliated with PostSecret.
- On 23 January 2010, "PostSecretUK" was launched, becoming the first spin-off to introduce email submissions. Like the Chinese version, it is not officially affiliated with PostSecret, but full credit is given to Warren and the original PostSecret. PostSecretUK discontinued a year later.
- "Post Secret Kazakhstan", a trilingual (Russian, Kazakh, and English) project was launched in January 2011 by a Peace Corps volunteer inspired by Frank Warren's original. It also has no official affiliation.
- The Norwegian page "Norske Hemmeligheter" was inspired by Warren but made its own version of the secrets. Secrets are sent through the webpage but illustrated by the two illustrators behind the page.
- There is also a "Postsecret Korea", though there is no reference to credit or endorsement of Warren.
- There is also an art-project called SecretumDoor, where one can find original secrets of 2005, both in Russian and English.

== Historical analogues ==
The 1973 book Variable Piece 4: Secrets by the conceptual artist Douglas Huebler (one of many works in his Variable Piece series) was a compilation of nearly 1800 secrets written by random people.

== See also ==
- Anonymous social media
- Whisper (app)
- Secret (app)
