= WhosHere =

Social networking app

- Website type: Geosocial networking
- Available in: English
- Owner: WhosHere
- Creator: WhosHere
- Website: whoshere.net
- Launched: July 2008
- Current status: active

WhosHere is a social proximity networking app created by WhosHere founders Bryant Harris and Stephen Smith launched in July 2008. WhosHere utilizes GPS location capabilities combined with a social networking platform that allows users to interact with other people based on compatible geographical location. The app allows users to find other users with similar interests and connect with them real-time via free text, image messages and free VoIP calls without disclosing any personal information. It runs on Apple iOS devices including iPhone, iPod touch and iPad.

== Service overview ==
The free application was launched in July 2008 on Apple's iTunes App Store as a geosocial networking and discovery service that allows iPhone and iPod touch users to see where they are in relation to each other. Features include being able to text message other users, see a list of nearby users, list of new users and a history list of users that have exchange messages. Now one can call via wi-fi with the iPod touch or iPhone if you have a microphone.

On September 23, 2008, the ability to send pictures between users was added to the application.

WhosHere has a user base of more than 8 million and is used globally in more than 150 countries. WhosHere announced the sending of its 4 billionth free text message.

== Platforms ==
WhosHere is available on iOS & Android and can be downloaded from the iTunes App Store and Google Play. WhosHere is also available via the Web.

== Trademark dispute ==
On June 1, 2012, allegations came forth that WhosHere, Inc. was suing the developer of a similar application. Brian Hamachek authored an application named "Who's Near Me" in 2010 and was requested by WhosHere (in 2011) to change the name of his application. Mr. Hamachek agreed to this. Subsequently, Mr. Hamachek reconsidered his decision and revived the "WhosNearMe" app name. WhosHere reasserted its claim of trademark infringement, unfair competition, cybersquatting, and breach of contract. WhosHere also offered to license Mr. Hamachek's technology, compensate him for that and use his services as an ongoing contractor on the project.

Mr. Hamachek made a variety of claims against WhosHere, which he ultimately recanted and posted a joint statement with WhosHere. Mr. Hamacheck's portion of the statement focused on three things.

1. Mr. Hamcheck had agreed to change the name of his app to "WNM Live" and subsequently changed it back despite the agreement between the two parties.
2. Correcting the record that WhosHere did not originally send a cease and desist notice.
3. That he was "confident that WhosHere and its attorney did not mislead me" as originally alleged.

WhosHere's portion of the statement thanked Mr. Hamacheck for resolving the matter and their goal was to defend their brand name.

== WhosHere, Inc. ==
WhosHere is a San Mateo, CA and Alexandria, VA-based developer of the location-based social networking application called WhosHere®. The company was founded by Bryant Harris and Stephen Smith.

== Criticism ==
In 2023 Ahmed Shihab-Eldin presented Queer Egypt Under Attack for BBC News focussing on the treatment of LGBT people in Egypt, including the entrapment of LGBT people by the Egyptian police, often using the app WhosHere. In the film, the app was criticized for poor privacy settings, and being open to hacking.

== See also ==
- Location-based service
