= Random (software) =

- Developer: Random
- Release: 2014
- Platform: iOS
- Type: Predictive discovery, finding new interesting things online
- License: Freeware
- Website: random.co

Random was an iOS mobile app that used algorithms and human-curation to create an adaptive interface to the Internet. The app served a remix of relevance and serendipity that allowed people to find diverse topics and interesting content that they might not have encountered otherwise.

Random did not require a login or sign-up - the use of the app was anonymous. The app was powered by an artificial intelligence that learned from direct and indirect user interactions inside the app. While learning and adapting to a person, Random created a unique anonymous choice profile that was then used for recommending topics and content. The app didn't recommend the same content twice.

== User interface ==
Random's user interface was made of ever-changing topic blocks that contained keywords and images. By choosing any of the blocks, the user would see related web content. By closing the web content, the user could access new related topics. The user interface allowed people to get more information about a specific topic area or then just leap freely from topic to topic. The content recommended by Random could be any type of web content, varying from news articles to long-form stories and from photographs to videos. Every user of the Random was curating content for other users by using the app.

== History ==
Random was launched in March 2014. The startup was backed by Skype co-founder Janus Friis.

The Random app received a strong reception from the likes of The New York Times, TechCrunch, New Scientist, Vice, and other leading publications. The app went on to gain traction with an active and loyal user community of several hundreds of thousands. This was not enough to support the free app model the team strongly believed in, and the service was terminated in December 2015.

== Reception ==
Various reviews in media have emphasized that Random enables people to break their filter bubble and find diverse content they might not find elsewhere.

Alan Henry of Lifehacker wrote: "Random... breaks you out by intentionally guiding you to new topics and interesting articles at sites you may not otherwise read." Vice Motherboard's Claire Evans says that: "Random never turns into a filter bubble, because it perpetually injects the irrational into my experience… in a cocktail of relevancy and serendipity."

The app has been said to have a unique, minimalistic user experience. Kit Eaton of The New York Times commented that Random "lets you browse the news in a different way to all the other news sites you've probably ever used." Mashable reviewed Random by concluding that the "app may be one of the most simple content-discovery apps on the market."
