= Ask.fm =

2010–2024 social website

ASKfm
- Former name: Ask.fm (until 14 January 2016)
- Company type: Social networking
- Website type: Social Q&A website
- Available in: 49 languages
- Founded: 16 June 2010; 16 years ago
- Area served: Worldwide
- Website: ask.fm
- Advertising: Yes
- Registration: Required to view profiles, ask questions and post responses
- Users: 215 million
- Launched: 16 June 2010; 16 years ago
- Current status: Closed since 1 December 2024; 23 months ago

ASKfm (Ask.fm until 14 January 2016) was a Latvian question and answer network launched in June 2010 as a competitor to Formspring. After registration, the user filled out their profile and could ask questions (anonymously or openly), reply on their profile, create photo polls. Also from 2021, app users could communicate anonymously or openly in public chats or directly in private chats. The platform had 300 million registered users as of November 2021.

The site was founded in 2010 in Riga, Latvia. Its headquarters was moved to Dublin, Ireland following its 2014 acquisition by IAC (who also own Ask.com).

ASKfm was officially shut down on 1 December 2024 following an announcement made by their administrators.

== History ==
The site was founded in Latvia by brothers Ilja (Iļja) and Mark Terebin (Marks Terebins), Oskars Liepiņš, Valērijs Višņakovs and Klāvs Sinka, and launched on 16 June 2010, as a rival to Formspring.

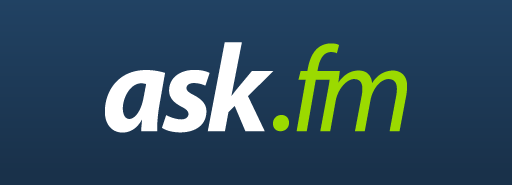
The former logo of ASKfm

By 2013, ASKfm reached 65 million registered users and continued its growth by approx. 300,000 new users per-day.

By February 2015, the number of registered users had grown to 80 million. Over 30 million questions and answers were created every day.

In 2016, ASKfm did a major rebranding, changed the logo, and made several interface improvements. Also, from then on users could change the color of the interface and add a background picture.

In 2017, ASKfm reached 215 million registered users and remained the largest Q&A network in the world.

In 2017, it introduced three new features – Photo Polls, Shoutouts, and Discover. Photo polls allow voting for one of two photos in the post. A shoutout was a question asked to random ASKfm users in one location. Discover was a separate feed for the most interesting answers in the country (closed in 2021).

In 2018, ASKfm created its in-app currency – coins and a separate Versus feed for photo polls. Also in 2019, users got the opportunity to buy coins within the application.

In 2019, the team released Leaderboards, the feature showing the most active users on the platform and Tipping, that allowed rewarding users' answers with coins.

In May 2019, it became known about the launch of the goods market, a store where users could purchase discounts and coupons for ASKfm coins. Also, it became known that the number of registered users on the platform reached 300 million.

In 2019, the app launched a VIP program to reward the most active users. Members of the VIP program had access to exclusive features of the app: creating secret answers, a personal progress bar that showed weekly statistics in the app. In 2021, private chats were added to these functions.

In 2020 the VIP program had already been joined by 147,500 askers from more than 50 countries. A special motivation system in the app let the VIP askers earn over 378 million coins, while the algorithms that promoted VIP-profiles got the users 2.4 million followers and 890,5 million likes. Besides, askers in Russia, Germany, and Italy got a chance to convert the coins they earned into real money. In the first year alone they managed to earn more than 4000 dollars by answering questions just like they did before.

Since 2020, registration was required to view profiles.

In 2020, at the peak of the pandemic COVID-19, 1 million users in Latin America returned to ASKfm. In March 2020, Twitter in Mexico was overflowing with tweets from people who remembered the social network of their childhood and started massively installing ASKfm. In just a day, the application reached 1st place in the App Store in less than 24 hours and 2nd place in Google Play in 36 hours in Mexico. During this period, ASKfm received more than 210,000 requests to restore old profiles, so the support service worked 24 hours a day.

In 2020, an ASKfm subscription was launched for the IOS app (and in 2021 for Android users). The subscription package included a VIP badge, bonus coins, a secret answer feature, and the ability to use the app without ads.

In May 2021, private chats appeared in ASKfm, where users could chat tête-à-tête. The author of a private chat could remain anonymous during the entire dialogue or write to the chat openly at any time.

On 1 December 2024, ASKfm shut down. This was justified by the recent sharp decline in user numbers.

== Assistance in the investigation of cyberbullying ==
On 6 August 2013, it was reported that Hannah Smith, a 14-year-old girl from Leicestershire, England, had killed herself and that her father blamed her death on cyberbullying responses she had received on the site. He called for tighter controls against social networking sites like ASKfm, saying that he had seen the abuse his daughter had received and it was wrong that it was anonymous.

ASKfm took a responsible approach to the investigation and conducted an internal audit. The further investigation showed there was not sufficient evidence to suggest that using the ASKfm site has led to the death of the young girl. In fact, Det Sgt Wayne Simmons revealed that Hannah had been sending 'bullying and aggressive messaging' to herself. Later Hannah Smith's case of self-bullying became a subject of academic research.

As a result, ASKfm made changes to its safety policies accordingly. Above all, the enhanced reporting and blocking functionalities, and they hired more moderation staff to review reports within 24 hours upon receiving them.

In August 2014, the site was purchased by IAC. ASKfm has since reconsidered its user safety policies and launched a Safety Advisory Board consisting of experts in digital safety, as well as a Safety Center. ASKfm officials met with the Department of Children to assure the proper steps are being taken to "significantly improve" protections on the website.

In 2017, ASKfm also partnered with Koko, a company that provide AI powered service in detecting damaging content. The partnership aims to address the phenomenon of "self-bullying" by detecting such cases and providing personalized distress-support.

In 2018, ASKfm teamed up with the UK charity The Diana Award and Dr Linda Papadopoulos for a research on how the online life affects the way young people build their identity. The findings allowed them to create a pack of educative materials of use to young people, parents and teachers.

== Assistance in combating terrorism ==
In 2014, BBC News documented ASKfm being used by ISIS for recruiting and advice. An ASKfm spokesperson said the company did not allow calls to violence or criminal activity. The ISIS accounts remained active a week after having been reported.

The company subsequently joined the European Commission's Internet Forum in 2015 to curb the spread of terrorist content and began implementing the joint industry hash database initiative to detect illegal terrorist content and also joined the UN Tech Against Terror initiative.

== Reception ==
ASKfm has been cited as an example of the problems anonymous social media can cause through its combination of offline contacts who know each other well, and the availability of online anonymity. From 2014, the company began constantly improving its service to prevent bullying.

== See also ==
- Social media
- Formspring
- Tellonym
