= Nearby =

US social networking service

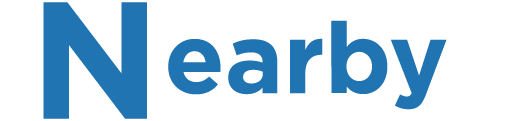
- Nearby Logo
- Original author: Brian Hamachek
- Developer: Brian Hamachek
- Release: June 2010; 16 years ago
- Platform: Microsoft Windows, Apple iOS, Windows Phone, Web, Facebook, Android
- Available in: English
- Type: Social Network
- Website: web.archive.org/web/20210201081116/https://www.wnmlive.com/

Nearby (previously named WNM Live / Who's Near Me) was a location-based social networking service launched in June 2010 and discontinued in September 2021 following a significant data breach. The service was created by Brian Hamachek and was known for leveraging the GPS technology in mobile devices to help users discover and interact with others located nearby, although explicitly not intended for dating, dating was the primary use case for the app.

== Background ==
Nearby was founded by Brian Hamachek, a software developer with a background in creating interactive social applications. The platform was initially part of the Microsoft BizSpark program, reflecting its early adoption of Microsoft technologies. In November 2013, it was accepted into the Fall 2013 session of the Stanford StartX accelerator, signaling its growth and innovation in the social networking space.

The application was created to enable communication among users based on geographic proximity, setting it apart from competitors by emphasizing community connections and local networking rather than focusing solely on dating. It underwent several name changes, from Who's Near Me to WNM Live, and finally to Nearby.

== Development and features ==
Nearby started with a Windows Mobile 6 application in June 2010, followed by a Windows Phone 7 application in October 2010. The platform expanded to include a web portal in April 2011 and applications for iPhone in January 2012, Windows 8 in May 2012, and Android in early 2013. The service was notable for its user-friendly interface, which underwent significant transformations to improve user interaction and engagement.

== User milestones ==
In 2012, the social network announced over 5 million users on the platform. The Android application has been downloaded over 5 million times and reviewed over 50,000 times. Before the platform's closure in 2021, the social network had over 13 million active users. The social network was most popular in the United States, the United Kingdom, and India.

== Legal and trademark disputes ==
In 2011, a trademark dispute arose with WhosHere, another location-based social networking service, which claimed that the name Who's Near Me was too similar to its own. The dispute resulted in a legal complaint against Nearby, leading to a settlement where the service agreed to rebrand as WNM Live. This episode was well-documented in tech media, highlighting the challenges of branding in the competitive app marketplace.

== Awards and recognition ==
The service received multiple accolades, including being named the second-best application at the 2011 Microsoft Worldwide Partner Conference and recognition in Nokia's Create competition within the NFC category. Nearby was selected by Microsoft as a Bizspark Featured Startup on April 30, 2013.

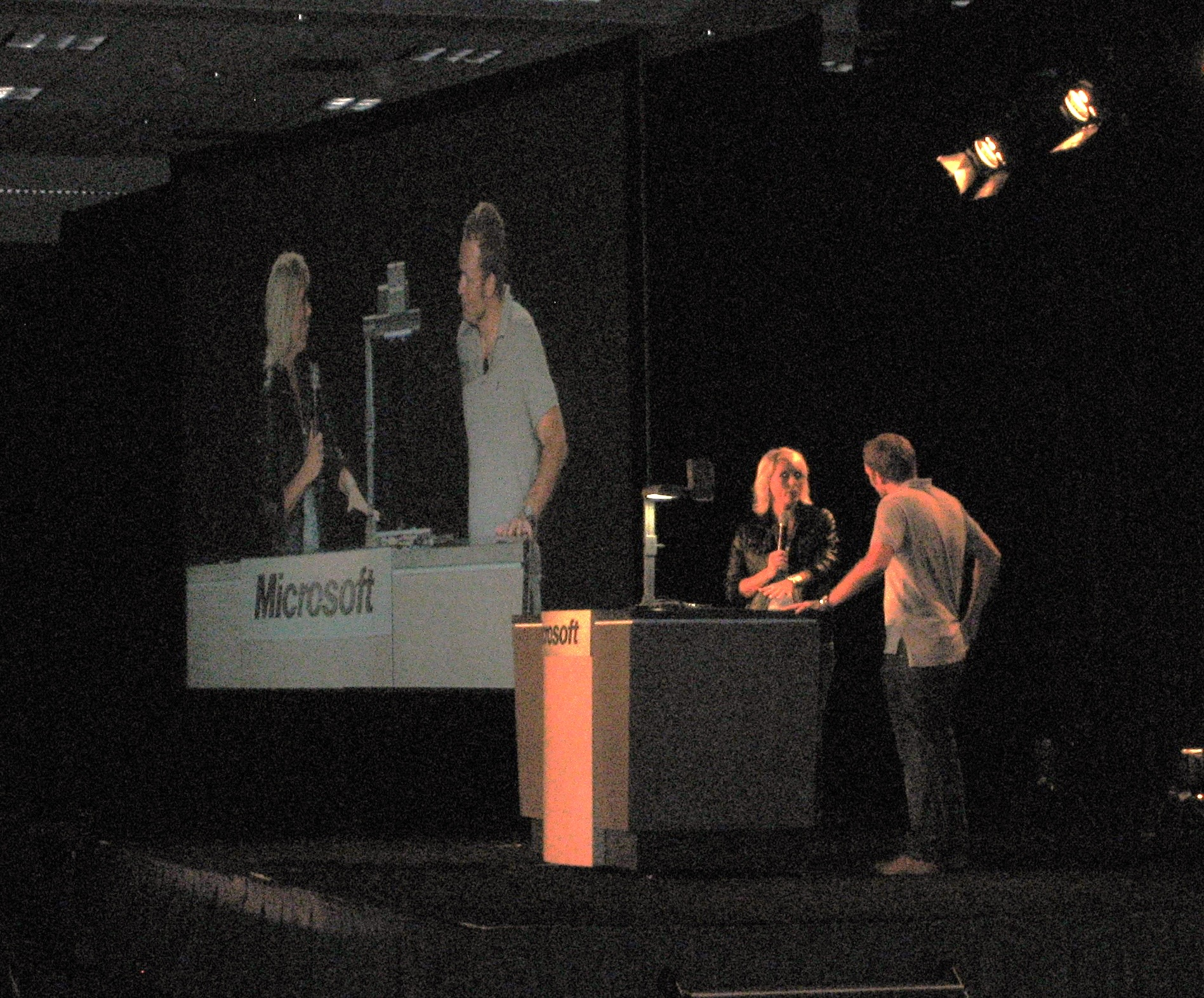
Brian Hamachek accepting an award for Nearby

== Closure ==
Nearby ceased operations in September 2021 after a data breach compromised user information. The shutdown signaled the end of an era for the groundbreaking social platform, which had amassed more than 13 million users worldwide. The company's departure from the market left a noticeable gap in the geosocial networking landscape.

== Data ==
After the service was shut down, the company released the service's non-private data, including all public news feed posts and comments and the network's followers graph, to Kaggle. This was done to support future research efforts.

== See also ==
- Location-based service
