= TigerConnect =

Instant messaging software

- Formerly: TigerText
- Type: Private
- Industry: Computer and Communications Industry
- Founded: 2010
- Founders: Andrew Brooks; Brad Brooks; Jeffrey Evans
- Headquarters: Los Angeles, United States
- Key people: Sean O'Neal (CEO) Brad Brooks (Executive Chairman)
- Website: www.tigerconnect.com

TigerConnect, Inc (formerly TigerText) is an American software communications company based in Los Angeles. The company is best known for its instant messaging application of the same name.

== History ==
TigerConnect was founded as TigerText in 2010 by co-founders billionaire Andrew Brooks, MD, CEO Brad Brooks, and Jeffrey Evans, founder of Buskin Records and Bassline Management who discovered and launched the career of Andra Day. They later went on to co-found the anonymous messaging app Whisper with Michael Heyward. The company is based in Santa Monica, California. In February 2012, TigerConnect secured more than $8 Million in new funding by Easton Capital and New Science Ventures bringing the company’s total backing to more than $10 million. In October 2013, the company announced its new freemium model and its 4th generation version, which supports multi-directory usage to increase the flexibility of the application. The company is focused on enterprises, healthcare, and financial services organizations that must comply with industry regulations such as HIPAA, SOX, and FINRA. The solution offers major improvements in workflow efficiency for enterprises, financial services institutions, government, hospitals, physicians and ancillary staff.

In July 2012, TigerText announced an API integration with Dropbox that allows users to send documents securely.

TigerText rebranded as TigerConnect March 6, 2018

TigerConnect recently expanded its technologies including two acquisitions: physician scheduling software, Call Scheduler and middleware provider, Critical Alert.

It was reported in May 2025 that Sean O'Neil would replace Brad Brooks as CEO.

== App ==
TigerConnect
- Developers: TigerConnect, Inc.
- Release: 2010
- Operating system: iOS, Android, desktop
- Type: Text messaging
- License: Proprietary
- Website: tigerconnect.com

The TigerConnect app is a cloud-based clinical communication and collaboration tool that was developed for the enterprise market. It allows patient information and other secure messages to be sent HIPAA compliantly. The app claims users cannot save, copy or forward the messages because TigerText stores the message on a company server, not the receiving and sending device, and deletes when the expiration conditions are met.

TigerText can be used on any Android, iPhone, iPad, iPod Touch, tablet, Mac or PC.

On April 14, 2015, TigerConnect announced an app for the Apple Watch. The app launched in 2017.

In October 2016, after TigerConnect named two healthcare vets to their executive team, TigerConnect launched a clinical communications platform that is designed for medical client value metrics.

== See also ==
- Comparison of instant messaging clients
