= Secret (app) =

Anonymous message sharing app

- Developers: Secret, Inc
- Release: January 30, 2014; 12 years ago
- Operating system: iOS, Android
- Type: Social Networking
- Website: www.secret.ly

Secret was an iOS and Android app service that allowed people to share messages anonymously within their circle of friends, friends of friends, and publicly. It differs from other anonymous sharing apps such as PostSecret, Whisper, and Yik Yak in that it was intended for sharing primarily with friends, potentially making it more interesting and addictive for people reading the updates. It was founded by David Byttow, the former lead for Square Wallet, and Chrys Bader-Wechseler, a former Google product manager at Google+, Photovine and YouTube. Bader-Wechseler left the company in January 2015, with the stated reason that the company's shift away from detailed design and towards more minimalistic design meant that he felt he was no longer the best person to be at the helm of the company. Byttow announced the shutdown of the app and the company on April 29, 2015.

== History ==
=== Launch and initial buzz ===
In December 2013, TechCrunch reported the existence of Secret (then in stealth, so its purpose was unclear), and also that it was raising $1.2 million, based on a Securities and Exchange Commission filing.

The app was released privately within Silicon Valley over the next two months. It started receiving press coverage in early February 2014, where it was revealed that the company had raised $1.4 million from Kleiner Perkins Caufield & Byers, Google Ventures, Alexis Ohanian and Garry Tan through their Initialized Capital vehicle, Index Ventures, Matrix Partners, SV Angel, and Fuel Capital. A number of technology news websites billed Secret as the latest craze in Silicon Valley.

The company had three employees and raised $8.6 million in its Series A round in March 2014.

False rumors about an impending acquisition of Evernote were circulated via Secret in early February 2014. Business Insider reported rumors (circulated on Secret) that Secret was about to acquire Whisper, another anonymous sharing app.

On February 10, Mashable reported that clothing retailer Gap was the first brand to join Secret. On February 13, 2014, Secret launched a Bug Bounty program for hackers who found vulnerabilities in its app. On February 14, Forbes reported that Secret would add more privacy controls. This happened on February 21: Secret added subscribe/unsubscribe options, post flagging, and unlinking options.

On May 21, Secret became available globally and also launched on the Android operating system. Secret added some more improvements in June: the launch of "Secret Dens" for schools and workplaces on June 9, and the ability to have a feed with only friends' posts on June 16.

On July 14, 2014, Secret announced that it had raised a $25 million Series B. Funders included Index Ventures, Redpoint Ventures, Garry Tan and Alexis Ohanian, SV Angel, Fuel Capital, Ceyuan Ventures, and anonymous investors.

=== Legal challenges in Brazil ===
On August 18, 2014, a Brazilian court granted a preliminary injunction to a public prosecutor that prohibits companies such as Apple, Google, and Microsoft from distributing the app and also compels the three companies to remotely delete the app on users' devices. The prosecutor sought the injunction after receiving user complaints of bullying. Currently, a user's only means of redress against bullies is to send a letter in English to an American judge via the Brazilian foreign ministry, essentially leaving Brazilian users powerless. The decision itself is based on chapter 5, article 1 of the Brazilian constitution. The article states, "the expression of thought is free, anonymity being forbidden." The judge ruled this makes Secret's promise of anonymity unconstitutional. The three American companies were given ten days to comply before facing fines of 20,000 reals ($8,870) a day. The three American tech giants have the chance to appeal ahead of a final ruling.

After the Brazilian courts hearing, the developers included new features for both the Android and iOS versions of the app aimed at safeguarding user privacy. After the changes, users can only use photos taken at the time of a posting, rather than images previously stored on the device. This was a direct response to the court's concerns about the use of private images without consent. An improved screening process was also implemented to prevent certain feelings, keywords and images being published. The company's team investigates possible violations and users are notified of any potential breach.

=== Redesign and change of focus ===
In December 2014, the company announced it would launch a faster 2.0 version with new chat features.

In January 2015, Secret launched its first "geofenced feed" at the CES conference, where both making and viewing posts was restricted to people within the geographical location of the conference. Later that month, Secret co-founder Bader-Wechseler left the company, with the stated reason that the company's shift away from beautiful design and towards more minimalistic design meant that he felt he was no longer the best person to be at the helm of the company.

In March 2015, it was revealed that the company was working on new apps based on what they had learned about user needs from the Secret app, but intended to continue to retain the original product. It was also revealed that Secret Dens were being used extensively internally at companies such as Google, Facebook, and Twitter.

=== Shutdown of the app and the company ===
On April 29, 2015, Secret's founder and CEO David Byttow announced his decision to shut the company down, claiming that the way people were using the app, including the spreading of malicious rumors, was not in line with what he had originally envisioned. The app was removed from the iOS and Android stores. Byttow intended to use the next two weeks to wind the company down, return money to investors, and delete all user data accumulated by the company. Of the decision to shut down the company and return the money to investors rather than attempt to pivot, he wrote: "Innovation requires failure, and I believe in failing fast in order to go on and make only new and different mistakes." He also promised to eventually publish postmortems "so that others can learn from the unique mistakes and challenges we faced and the wisdom gained from such an incredible 16 months."

== Reception ==
=== Reception upon release and growth ===
Technology commentators likened Secret to the shuttered app PostSecret and the app Whisper, all part of a growing trend towards anonymous and quasi-anonymous sharing, a pushback against Facebook's successful push to encourage real name use throughout the Internet.

An article in The Guardian argued that although Secret was fast becoming a craze, "we should be cautious about who we trust".

Detailed reviews of Secret were published in Technology Review and TechCrunch.

On July 31, 2014, Sarah Lacy published a lengthy critique of Secret in PandoDaily, noting that one of the app's main use cases was to spread malicious lies about people and organizations, and that she was puzzled that investors she considered ethical were considering investing in the company. She also suggested that there was a reasonable chance that the app would lead to teen suicides due to bullying and lies being spread about people. Secret co-founder David Byttow dismissed the post in a tweet, noting that it sent very little traffic to Secret's website. Paul Carr responded on PandoDaily, and Secret's PR representative expressed disappointment saying she didn't like it when people wrote bad things about others without talking to them first. Carr responded again, noting the irony of the tweet given Secret's main use case. Lacy wrote a follow-up post a week after her initial post, discussing events that had transpired over the week and their implications for her thesis.

=== Reception upon shutdown ===
Upon the shutdown of the app, Mike Isaac wrote in the New York Times that Secret's rapid rise, subsequent fall and eventual shutdown illustrated the "flash-in-the-pan" nature of many Silicon Valley companies. The article also noted that the co-founders had cashed out to the tune of $3 million each during an earlier round of fundraising, raising questions of their commitment to and confidence in the long-term vision and success of the company. Issie Lapowsky, writing for Wired Magazine, noted: "founder David Byttow seems to have realized what the rest of us have known all along: anonymity makes people into total assholes" but later in the article questioned whether, if Secret had enjoyed the traction that competitor Yik Yak had, Byttow would still shut the company down.

== Key people ==
=== David Byttow ===
David Mark Byttow (born February 12, 1982) is an American Internet entrepreneur who was the co-founder and CEO of Secret. In October 2018, it was announced that Byttow is now the director of engineering at Snap, Inc.

==== Early life and education ====
Byttow was born and raised in Munster, Indiana and taught himself how to program video games at the age of 10. He dropped out of Purdue University to pursue a career in video game programming.

==== Career ====
In 2001, Byttow joined a (now defunct) video game company named CodeFire. After that, he joined The Collective as a gameplay programmer for popular video game consoles. In 2007, Byttow did contract work for Bandai Namco Entertainment on the Xbox 360 and PS3 game Afro Samurai. He then joined Google as a Staff Engineer for five years where he worked on App Engine, Google Wave and Google+. He then joined Square, Inc. as Technical Director and head of Square Wallet. He was at Square for nearly a year before founding Secret with Google-colleague Chrys Bader-Wechseler.

Byttow announced the shut down of Secret on April 29, 2015.

After Secret shut down, Byttow began working on a project called Bold designed to "help teams and companies foster ideas." In 2017, after a few years working to establish this company, Byttow terminated the idea and joined Postmates to lead Product and Engineering for their apps. In October 2018, he joined Snap as its director of engineering, but left the company six months later. Byttow had previously taken an interest in Snapchat since 2014 when he met Evan Spiegel and tried to take Secret in a similar direction as the platform.

== See also ==
- Anonymous social media
- Whisper (app)
- PostSecret
- Yik Yak
