= Yo (greeting) =

Interjection

Yo is a slang interjection, commonly associated with North American English and Philadelphia English. It was popularized by Italian Americans in Philadelphia during the 1940s.

Although often used as a greeting and often deployed at the beginning of a sentence, yo may also come at the end of a sentence and/or may be used to place emphasis on or to direct focus onto a particular individual, group, or issue at hand, or to gain the attention of another individual or group. It may also be used to express emotions such as; excitement, surprise, disbelief, enthusiasm, anger, or amazement.

== Etymology and history ==
The interjection yo was first used in Middle English. In addition to yo, it was also sometimes written io.

Though the term may have been in use in an isolated manner in different contexts earlier in English, its current usage and popularity derives from its use in Philadelphia's Italian American population in the twentieth century, which spread to other ethnic groups in the city, notably among Philadelphia African Americans, and later spread beyond Philadelphia.

From the late twentieth century, it frequently appeared in hip-hop and became associated with African American Vernacular English.

== Other uses ==
- In Baltimore, and possibly other cities, yo (or a word coincidentally identical to it) has become a gender-neutral pronoun.
- Among the first times the word was used in mass media, "Yo" was seen in the title Yo! MTV Raps, a popular American television hip-hop music program in the late 1980s.
