= Whisper (app) =

Social media mobile app

- Developer: WhisperText LLC
- Release: March 31, 2012

Final release(s) [±]
- Android: 9.58.0 / May 18, 2022; 4 years ago
- iOS: 9.0.0 / January 6, 2025; 22 months ago
- Operating system: iOS
- Type: Social Networking
- License: Proprietary
- Website: whisper.sh

Whisper
- Industry: Software
- Defunct: 2021
- Successor: MediaLab AI Inc.
- Headquarters: Venice, California, United States
- Owners: Brad Brooks, Michael Heyward

Whisper was a free proprietary mobile app. It was a form of anonymous social media, allowing users to post and share photo and video messages anonymously, although this claim has been challenged with privacy concerns over Whisper's handling of user data. The postings, called "whispers", consist of text superimposed over an image, and the background imagery is either automatically retrieved from Whisper's search engine or uploaded by the user.

== History ==
The app was launched in March 2012 by WhisperText LLC. It was co-founded by CEO Michael Heyward (Note: Son of the entertainment executive Andy Heyward) and Brad Brooks. (Note: CEO of mobile messaging service TigerText.)

Beginning in 2015, the service sought to become more of a brand advertising platform, with promotional partnerships with Netflix, NBCUniversal, Disney, HBO and MTV.

In February 2016, Whisper announced the launch of the Spanish-language version of its app on both iOS and Android devices, with an initial launch in Mexico. In March, Whisper partnered with the It Gets Better Project in Mexico (Todo Mejora México) on a campaign to empower LGBTQ voices in Mexico.

In June 2016, Whisper announced that they would be introducing video ads, and started on July 3 with a partnership with Universal Studios' to promote the movie The Secret Life of Pets. Whisper said that it would share the most popular posts on its Facebook page, which reportedly reached more than 200 million people.

In June 2016, Whisper also added a "Groups" function, which allows users to curate Whispers under different topics, and to connect with other users who have shared interests.

In February 2017, Whisper announced its partnership with HBO to promote the TV series Big Little Lies, and also embarked on promotional partnerships with Dove soap and Universal Music Group.

According to TechCrunch, as of March 2017, Whisper had a total of 17 billion monthly pageviews on its mobile and desktop websites, social channels and publisher network, with 250 million monthly users across 187 countries.

In March 2017, Whisper launched a video widget that publishers (primarily news websites) could embed within articles to feature contextual Whisper content.

In May 2017, MTV partnered with Whisper to promote the 2017 MTV Movie & TV Awards. That same month, the Tronc media company, which publishes the Los Angeles Times and Chicago Tribune, began using Whisper's content widget on its websites.

In October 2022, Whisper was removed from the Apple App Store, then re-added but removed temporarily again in 2023; it was most recently restored to the App Store in March 2024. Whisper was removed for a final time from the App Store and as of October 2024 is still not listed as an app. In September 2024, the app was removed from the Google Play Store but returned in January 2025 before being removed again that same month.

In July 2025, the app was permanently discontinued.

== Features ==
Alexis Madrigal of The Atlantic describes the service as follows:

Anyone can post an anonymous message to the service in the form of an image macro: text overlaid on a picture. When you open the app, you see six such images. Each one has a "secret" on it. You can respond to a message publicly or privately, choosing a public anonymous post or a private pseudonymous chat. Users don't have a public identity in the app. While they do have persistent handles, there's no way to contact them except *through* the messages they post.

== User base ==
In April 2015, Whisper reached 10 million monthly active users. Stories about the app have appeared in Forbes, USA Today, The Washington Post, and Huffington Post, and Heyward was featured on Forbes' Top 30 under 30 in Technology list in January 2014. In early November 2013, Whisper was reported to have reached 2.5 billion monthly page views and nearly 3 billion page views in December 2013. Whisper has 10 billion monthly page views as of Spring 2015. In December 2015, it was reported that Whisper had reached 20 million active users, double the number of users it had six months earlier. In April 2016, it was reported that Whisper had reached over 30 million monthly active users. In terms of demographics, The New York Times named Whisper in September 2015 as a social media platform of choice for Generation Z in an article about Internet habits among Generation Z and Millennials. As of June 2017, 75% of Whisper's usership was between the ages of 18 and 34, and predominantly female, as reported by Fast Company magazine, which also added that: "According to CrowdTangle data, Whisper's Facebook page was the top-performing media fan page for interactions on the social network with approximately 200 million interactions in fiscal year 2016. If these metrics are correct, Whisper outperformed CNN, Vice and BuzzFeed on Facebook for interactions."

== Concept ==
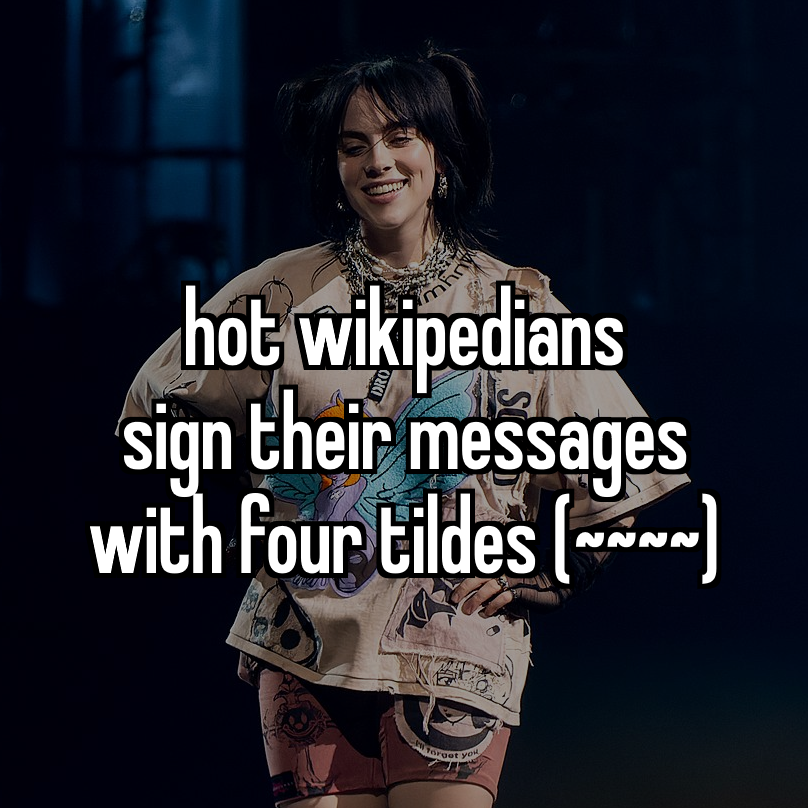
A meme designed to look like a Whisper post

CBS New York describes Whisper as "the place to go these days to vent, come clean, or peer into other people's secrets", and that the goal is that of "turning confessions into content".

The app purports to promote online anonymity, and the developer claims this will prevent and combat cyberbullying. In October 2015, Whisper announced a partnership with the Ad Council on the "I Am A Witness" anti-bullying campaign, along with other tech companies, including Facebook, Twitter and Snapchat, and in March 2016, Whisper announced a partnership with the Anti-Defamation League's Best Practices for Responding to Online Hate. The service's anonymity is claimed to have fostered a support network where concern and care among users has developed: according to Mashable, "The team regularly hears from users that the network's community has helped them stop self-harming behaviors." Another premise behind the service was to counter the "best possible self" ego-driven self-aggrandizing "vanity" posting done on Facebook, and as an antidote to the phenomenon of "oversharing" and "too much information" that young users engage in online. Business Insider, Forbes and The Daily Dot have called it "the anti-Facebook", and Forbes Tech drew a contrast in stating that, "Whisper, even more than Snapchat, is the anti-Facebook." The digital-news website SMU SMC summed up all these points together: "In addition to preventing cyber bullies, Whisper gives users the opportunity to confess to things that could potentially ruin marriages, friendships or result in loss of job, without suffering consequences. You can over share without any repercussions." As described by Adweek, "This is a new type of social sharing, the kind that won't come back to haunt you."

Whisper has also been used as a platform for citizen journalism. In June 2014, amid widespread violence and unrest in Iraq and the Iraqi government's blocking of Twitter, Facebook and YouTube, many Iraqis downloaded and used Whisper as a means of acting as real-time reporters, posting news and updates hours before the mainstream media, as well as sharing political views and personal thoughts and feelings. It is also used to create text-based memes that appeal to Generation Z Internet users. According to the analytics firm SensorTower, app downloads rose during 2021 as a large number of social media users, mostly on Instagram, started using Whisper to create meme images. In The New York Times article "Text Memes Are Taking Over Instagram", Taylor Lorenz wrote: "Confessional, overly personal messages paired with seemingly unrelated images allowed for an extra layer of humor and irony."

== Technology ==
Development of the system was outsourced to Inaka, a web and mobile app development consultancy based in Seattle, Washington and Buenos Aires, Argentina. The original system back end used the Riak NoSQL database, but after performance problems with Riak the system was converted to use MySQL and Apache Cassandra. Since 2013, Whisper has brought its technology team in-house. Whisper had 25 engineers in Venice, California in 2015.

In March 2016, Fast Company reported that Whisper had recently begun to use deep learning to build a content moderation tool, internally dubbed the Arbiter. The article noted that, because Whisper's Arbiter has knowledge to "reflect both the real things that millions of Whisper users have said and how moderators handled them, its understanding of language can be remarkably subtle."

According to the Los Angeles Times, Whisper is also using AI technology to create content. That system, the Times reports, "allows Whisper to gather related posts about issues at work, school or in relationships. Then, it organizes them, adds context and even writes a headline."

== Corporate ==
The company, WhisperText LLC, is led by CEO Michael Heyward, is based in the Venice tech hub of Los Angeles, California, now known as "Silicon Beach", and the company has offices in New York City as well.

WhisperText LLC received its first round of venture-capital funding from Lightspeed Venture Partners for $3 million in April 2013, and then a second round of funding from Sequoia Capital, Trinity Capital, Krum Capital and Lightspeed for $21 million in September 2013. PitchBook, an independent private equity and venture capital research firm, forecasted in November 2013 that Whisper is one of the likeliest social platform IPOs, with a pre-money valuation of $85 million. According to Om Malik, founder and senior writer of GigaOM, Whisper was already, as of July 2013, valued at $100 million. In May 2014, Whisper confirmed that it raised an additional $36 million in venture funding from Shasta Ventures, Sequoia Capital, Thrive Capital and Lightspeed Ventures. Whisper has raised $61 million in total venture capital funding.

Whisper has two parts to its advertising business: direct sales for advertising clients, and programmatic ads that show up on a user's phone when they use the Whisper app. Whisper has experimented with advertising by working with Fox Studios, MTV, Universal, Hulu and FX on customized branded campaigns. In September 2015, Adweek revealed that Coca-Cola was using Whisper to market its #makeithappy anti-cyberbullying campaign to Whisper's users. In late 2015, Whisper embarked on an advertising partnership with Disney and Pixar, starting with the promotion of the 3D animated movie The Good Dinosaur. In February 2016, Mashable and Teen Vogue announced that Whisper had partnered with Giphy to allow GIFs in the chat section of its platform. In April 2016, the app launched Whisper Polls, whereby brands can question potential consumers, the users, about various types of opinions, preferences and interests. The app was also planning to start interacting directly with users through a "cards" feature, prompting users to post about specific topics. On April 13, 2016, Whisper was featured in a discussion on The Howard Stern Show, where Howard and co-host Robin talked about confessions from men who were victims of domestic violence at the hands of their own wives.

== Controversy ==
The Whisper app has been criticized for requiring access to smartphone features such as the camera and the user's contact list, which is disclosed when the app is downloaded on the Android platform.

In May 2015, a 15-year-old girl from Bolton, Massachusetts was charged with making a threat on Whisper towards a school, referencing the Columbine shootings; she was tracked down using Whisper and GPS.

In July 2018, a 31-year-old man from Toronto, Canada allegedly met a 15-year-old girl using Whisper and was charged with luring a child, two counts of sexual assault and other charges, including possession of child pornography.

=== Privacy policy ===
The company's privacy policy reveals that it will turn over information in the case of requests from law enforcement in order to comply with applicable laws for enforceable government requests such as a subpoena. The Electronic Frontier Foundation's attorney Hanni Fakhoury commented in early 2014 that while Whisper may have no legal choice in the matter, "it's the doublespeak that's problematic." Fakhoury elaborated that: "You have to be very careful about selling a program as a secure way to secretly communicate, and then reserve the right to turn over that information whenever necessary."

=== The Guardian allegations ===
In October 2014, The Guardian newspaper alleged that:

- Whisper retains every user's posts indefinitely in a central database (including "deleted" posts), together with each post's timestamp and approximate geolocation, even if the user has opted out of geolocation;
- Whisper allegedly stores or processes user information outside the United States despite having told its users that "we process and store all information in the United States". Whisper has said that while it does use an outsourcing firm for content moderation based in the Philippines, no data is stored outside the U.S.
- Whisper allegedly provides data it gathers (including geolocation data) to the FBI and MI5. Whisper participated in a DOD project about suicide prevention by sharing aggregate mentions of certain words on military bases.

Whisper disputed nearly all The Guardian's allegations and made a point-by-point response to The Guardian. After reading Whisper's response, Twitter's former security head Moxie Marlinspike commented on Hacker News that Whisper "should never have claimed to provide anonymity if it had to track users to make the app function". He pointed out that there are many "hard problems" that need to be solved before a service can claim to provide truly unlinkable anonymity, and that "there are projects like Tor that are approaching these types of problems seriously, but apps like Whisper or Secret end up poisoning the well and confusing users". According to Marlinspike, Whisper was claiming that they could not track their users, when instead they were "squarely in the [would not] category".

On October 23, 2014, U.S. Senator Jay Rockefeller asked Whisper's CEO to appear before him and the staff of the Senate Committee on Commerce, Science, and Transportation to explain Whisper's tracking systems, tracking data retention, and data distribution. BuzzFeed, the Huffington Post and Fusion suspended their partnerships with Whisper.

In March 2015, The Guardian published a clarification of the October 2014 piece in which it had made numerous allegations about Whisper's privacy protection and metadata policy. The Guardian clarified the claims regarding user location, data storage, changes to Whisper's terms of service and security policy and the sharing of user data with the U.S. Department of Defense. It also removed an opinion piece titled "Think you can Whisper privately? Think again." The retraction was covered by several news outlets, including The Wall Street Journal, CNN Money, TechCrunch and Mashable.

=== Xipiter report ===
On March 22, 2015, a security startup called Xipiter published a report in which they outlined serious security concerns and the resistance they met when trying to bring these concerns to the attention of Whisper.sh. They claimed that they could hijack a user's account, post (publicly or privately) as a hijacked user, and view all of a user's current and past private messages. In response, Whisper's co-founder Michael Heyward and its CTO Chad DePue claimed that it is not possible to do such things with their app and accused Xipiter of fabricating their proof-of-concept video. Xipiter's claims have yet to be validated or disproved by independent security researchers.

== Your Voice ==
Whisper Text LLC claims to have set up a companion nonprofit for its users called Your Voice, which, according to its website, is "dedicated to raising awareness about mental health issues on college campuses". The site claims to provide resources and support for college students dealing with depression, anxiety, eating disorders, sexuality and LGBTQ issues, bullying, suicide prevention and stress management. The website provides links to various services run by other organizations, but offers no services of its own. The contact telephone number on the website to call for help is the National Suicide Prevention Lifeline, which is funded by the U.S. Department of Health and Human Services.

== See also ==
- Anonymous social media
- Confessions page
- PostSecret
- Secret (app)
- The Guardian Project (software)
- Tor (anonymity network)
