= Anonymous social media =

Type of social networking service

Anonymous social media is a subcategory of social media wherein the main social function is to share and interact around content and information anonymously on mobile and web-based platforms. Another key aspect of anonymous social media is that content or information posted is not connected with particular online identities or profiles.

== Background ==
Appearing very early on the web as mostly anonymous-confession websites, this genre of social media has evolved into various types and formats of anonymous self-expression. One of the earliest anonymous social media forums was 2channel, which was first introduced online on May 30, 1999, as a Japanese text board forum.

With the way digital content is consumed and created continuously changing, the trending shift from web to mobile applications is also affecting anonymous social media. This can be seen as anonymous blogging, or various other format based content platforms such as nameless question and answer online platforms like Ask.fm introduced mobile versions of their services. The number of new networks joining the anonymous social sharing scene continues to grow rapidly.

== Degrees of anonymity ==
Across different forms of anonymous social media there are varying degrees of anonymity. Some applications, such as Librex, require users to sign up for an account, even though their profile is not linked to their posts. While these applications remain anonymous, some of these sites can sync up with the user's contact list or location to develop a context within the social community and help personalize the user's experience, such as Yik Yak or Secret. Other sites, such as 4chan and 2channel, allow for a purer form of anonymity as users are not required to create an account, and posts default to the username of "Anonymous". While users can still be traced through their IP address, there are anonymizing services like I2P or various proxy server services that encrypt a user's identity online by running it through different routers. Secret users must provide a phone number or email when signing up for the service, and their information is encrypted into their posts. Stylometry poses a risk to the anonymity or pseudonymity of social media users, who may be identifiable by writing style; in turn, they may use adversarial stylometry to resist such identification.

== Controversy ==
Apps such as Formspring, Ask, Sarahah, Whisper, and Secret have elicited discussion around the rising popularity of anonymity apps, including debate and anticipation about this social sharing class. As more and more platforms join the league of anonymous social media, there is growing concern about the ethics and morals of anonymous social networking as cases of cyber-bullying, and personal defamation occurs. Formspring, also known as spring.me, and Ask.fm have both been associated with teen suicides as a result of cyberbullying on the sites. Formspring has been associated with at least three teen suicides and Ask.fm with at least five.

For instance, the app Secret got shut down due to its escalated use of cyberbullying. The app Yik Yak has also helped to contribute to more cyberbullying situations and, in turn, was blocked on some school networks. Their privacy policy meant that users could not be identified without a subpoena, search warrant, or court order. Another app called After School also sparked controversy for its app design that lets students post any anonymous content. Due to these multiple controversies, the app has been removed from both Apple and Google app stores. As the number of people using these platforms multiplies, unintended uses of the apps have increased, urging popular networks to enact in-app warnings and prohibit the use for middle and high school students. 70% of teens admit to making an effort to conceal their online behavior from their parents. Even Snapchat has some relation to the health of children after using social media. This is an app that is meant to be quick and simple but in many ways it can be overwhelming. A person can post something, and it will be gone in seconds. Oftentimes, the post that was made was inappropriate and harmful to another person. It's a never-ending cycle.

Some of these apps have also been criticized for causing chaos in American schools, such as lockdowns and evacuations. In order to limit the havoc caused, anonymous apps are currently removing all abusive and harmful posts. Apps such as Yik Yak, Secret, and Whisper are removing these posts by outsourcing the job of content supervision to oversea surveillance companies. These companies hire a team of individuals to inspect and remove any harmful or abusive posts. Furthermore, algorithms are also used to detect and remove any abusive posts the individuals may have missed. Another method used by the anonymous app named Cloaq to reduce the number of harmful and abusive posts is to limit the number of users that can register during a certain period. Under this system, all contents are still available to the public, but only registered users can post. Other websites such as YouTube have gone on to create new policies regarding anonymity. YouTube now does not allow anonymous comments on videos. Users must have a Google account to like, dislike, comment or reply to comments on videos. Once a sign-in user "likes" a video, it will be added to that user's 'Liked video playlist'. YouTube changed their "Liked video playlist" policy in December 2019, allowing a signed-in user to keep their "Liked video playlist" private.

Historically, these controversies and the rise of cyberbullying have been blamed on the anonymous aspect of many social media platforms, but about half of US adult online harassment cases do not involve anonymity, and researchers have found that if targeted harassment exists offline it will also be found online, because online harassment is a reflection of existing prejudices.

== As platforms for anonymous discussion ==
Anonymous social media can be used for political discussion in countries where political opinions opposed to the government are normally suppressed, and allow persons of different genders to communicate freely in cultures where such communication is not generally accepted. In the United States, the 2016 presidential election led to an increase in the use of anonymous social media websites to express political stances.

Moreover, anonymous social media can also provide authentic connection to complete anonymous communication. There have been cases where these anonymous platforms have saved individuals from life-threatening situation or spread news about a social cause. Additionally, anonymous social websites also allow internet users to communicate while also safeguarding personal information from criminal actors and corporations that sell users' data.

A study in 2017 on the content posted to 4chan's /pol/ board found that the majority of the content was unique, including 70% of the 1 million images included in the studied data set.

== Revenue generated by anonymous social media ==
=== Anonymous apps ===
Generating revenue from anonymous apps has been a discussion for investors. Since little information is collected about the users, it is difficult for anonymous apps to advertise to users. However some apps, such as Whisper, have found a method to overcome this obstacle. They have developed a "keyword-based" approach, where advertisements are shown to users depending on certain words they type. The app Yik Yak has been able to capitalize on the features they provide. Anonymous apps such a Chrends take the approach of using anonymity to provide freedom of speech. Telephony app Burner has regularly been a top grossing utilities app in the iOS and Android app stores using its phone number generation technology. Despite the success of some anonymous apps, there are also apps, such as Secret, which have yet to find a way to generate revenue. The idea of an anonymous app has also caused mixed opinions within investors. Some investors have invested a large sum of money because they see the potential revenue generated within these apps. Other investors have stayed away from investing these apps because they feel these apps bring more harm than good.

=== Anonymous sites ===
There are several sources to generate revenue for anonymous social media sites. One source of revenue is by implementing programs such as a premium membership or a gift-exchanging program. Another source of revenue is by merchandising goods and specific usernames to users. In addition, sites such as FMyLife, have implemented a policy where the anonymous site will receive 50% of profit from apps that makes money off it.

In terms of advertisements, some anonymous sites have had troubles implementing or attracting them. There are several reasons for this problem. Anonymous sites, such as 4chan, have received few advertisement offers due to some of the contents it generates. Other anonymous sites, such as Reddit, have been cautious in implementing them in order to maintain their user base. Despite the lack of advertisements on certain anonymous sites, there are still anonymous sites, such as SocialNumber, that support the idea.

== See also ==
- Anonymous post
- Dark web § Social media
- Online disinhibition effect

== Bibliography ==
- Gröndahl, Tommi; Asokan, N. (2020). "Text Analysis in Adversarial Settings: Does Deception Leave a Stylistic Trace?". ACM Computing Surveys. 52 (3): 1–36. arXiv:1902.08939. doi:10.1145/3310331. S2CID 67856540.
