= Yik Yak =

Social media smartphone app

- Headquarters: Nashville, Tennessee
- Industry: Internet
- Website: yikyak.com
- Registration: None
- Launched: 2013 (Relaunched in 2021)
- Current status: Operating

Yik Yak is a pseudonymous social media smartphone application that initially launched in 2013 and relaunched in 2021. The app, which is available for iOS and (formerly) Android, allows college students to create and view discussion threads within a 5-mile (8.0 km) radius (termed "Yaks" by the application). It is similar to other anonymous sharing apps such as Nearby, but differs from others such as Whisper in that it is intended for sharing primarily with those in proximity to the user.

Despite strong levels of growth in 2013 and 2014, following several bouts of heavy criticism in the media over the dissemination of racism, antisemitism, sexism and the facilitation of cyber-bullying, the service saw stagnation in the growth of its user base. In 2016 alone, user downloads fell 76% compared to 2015. Failing to maintain user engagement, Yik Yak announced on April 28, 2017, that the service would close in the coming week. For $1 million, Block, Inc. (formally Square, Inc.), purchased Yik Yak's intellectual property and hired several of its former employees. On August 15, 2021, Yik Yak announced via their official website that they were making a comeback, with the app available for download on iOS. In March 2023, Yik Yak was purchased by Sidechat, a competing pseudonymous platform.

== History ==
The co-founders, Tyler Droll and Brooks Buffington, are both graduates from Furman University in Greenville, South Carolina. The two started collaborating when they were placed into the same class where they learned how to code iPhone apps. After graduating from Furman University, they decided to go full-time with their project. Droll dropped out of medical school just before it started and Buffington put his finance career on hold. The two released the app in November 2013, and twelve months later, Yik Yak was ranked as the ninth most downloaded social media app in the United States. Improvements on the Yik Yak app continued throughout 2015, including measures to ensure its sustainability. The last major change was the announcement on January 20, 2016, that a web version of the app was available. Attempts were made in 2015 to reduce its use for cyber-bullying, such as the new mandatory use of handles (later reverted to an optional feature) and removal of the "My Herd" feature (also was later reverted).

On April 24, 2017, in a Bloomberg article, Block, Inc. (formerly Square, Inc.) announced its intent to acquire the rights to Yik Yak and five members of its team for reportedly less than $3 million, later revealed to be closer to $1 million after final sale.

On April 28, 2017, Yik Yak announced it would be shutting down due to declining popularity, and the app ceased to function as of May 5, 2017.

In February 2021, an unnamed team purchased the rights to the YikYak brand from Block, Inc.

In May 2022, a student revealed that, after analyzing app data, he was able to gain access to precise locations of Yik Yak users. The accuracy was within 10 to 15 feet and, in combination with user IDs, could potentially be used to reveal users' identities.

In March 2023, Sidechat, a competing app, bought out Yik Yak, at an undisclosed price. Yik Yak was subsequently republished on the AppStore under a different developer name. At the same time, the app's Android version was removed from Google Play.

== Funding ==
Yik Yak was originally funded by Atlanta Ventures with offices based in the Atlanta Tech Village. On April 22, 2014, the company announced that it had secured $1.5 million in funding from various companies such as Vaizra Investments, DCM, Kevin Colleran, and Azure Capital Partners. This funding came five months after Yik Yak was founded, and was intended both to enhance the app, and to market the app both in the United States and overseas. On June 30, 2014, a little over two months after the initial $1.5 million, Yik Yak secured $10 million more from its previous investors, together with new investors Renren Lianhe Holdings and Tim Draper. During the fall of 2014, with exponential user growth, Yik Yak secured over $60 million from Sequoia Capital and other investors. Less than one year after its launch, Yik Yak then had a valuation of over $350 million. On May 5, 2017, the application servers and website went offline, and the application became defunct. In 2021, Yik Yak announced on its website that it had received $6.25 million in seed funding from an unnamed investor.

== Features ==
- Yak: A shorthand term used to refer to a post on the Yik Yak app. Yaks provide the main function of the app, and can be up or downvoted, commented on, and shared. Yaks are limited to 200 characters and can be removed if a yak violates the community guardrails.
- Yakarma: Yakarma is a numerical score generated by the software that aims to measure the active success of a user. This number can increase or decrease based upon the responses to their yaks by other proximate users. Yakarma changes depending on the number of downvotes or upvotes, replies, and comments that are made on a user's post. Receiving downvotes negatively affects a user's Yakarma, while upvotes increase it. The exact effect on yakarma is determined by the status (yakarma) of the voting user.
- New: Features new yaks posted within 5 miles in chronological order.
- Hot: Features the top yaks posted within 5 miles, top yaks reset daily at 8pm EST / 7pm Central.
- Reply Icons: User anonymity is designed into Yik Yak conversations by assigning the Original Poster an OP icon, and repliers were randomly generated emojis, while in the original application was limited to 20 emojis, the relaunch provided over 100. While the icon is randomly assigned, the user can choose to randomize it as many times as they like. This icon follows the user in every conversation they participate in, and the user has the possibility to credit their icon to a yak they post if they choose. Each reply icon could be backed by any of the color circles, which added to the randomness of the anonymity for each user.
- Nationwide Hot: This feature shows the highest voted yaks in descending order.
- Upvote/Downvote: Up and down votes are essentially user ratings on a given yak. For a post to become popular it has to receive more upvotes than downvotes, at which time it displays a positive number next to it. If votes on a post reach a value of -5, it will be permanently deleted.
- Cuss Buster: Similar to the word filter, the Cuss Buster filters out Yaks that may contain inappropriate language. The Cuss Buster is an option users can enable/disable in settings. While it does provide a filter to censor words, it cannot guarantee inappropriate content will be caught and removed from the feed.
- YakBall (Yak Games): An in-app game modeled off Agar.io. Users compete in tournaments with campuses forming separate teams. Other Yak Games include an online Cup Pong, a Wordle variant, and an online Scrabble.

== Defunct features ==
- Other Top Yaks: This simply showed the Google Images result page from searching the word "yak". Usually just pictures of yaks (the animal).
- Hidden Features: Yik Yak also contained a word filter. When a post contained threatening or offensive language, the app would remind the user that their post could be offensive, and asked them if they still wished to post it. If the user bypassed the warning, the post would then be flagged and subject to removal by moderators. Posts that contained phone numbers could not be posted.

== Campus Rep Program ==
The Campus Rep (short for Campus Representative) Program was announced by Yik Yak via Twitter on December 23, 2021. Campus Representatives, also called Campus Herders, are students at a college or university who find and post Yaks from their respective herds to a social media account (Instagram, TikTok) they run and manage.

== Controversies ==
One of the biggest criticisms of social media sites and applications is their inherent potential to feed the growing amount of cyberbullying. Due to the widespread bullying and harassment committed through Yik Yak, many schools and school districts took action to ban the app. These included several Chicago school districts, Norwich University in Vermont, Eanes Independent School District in Texas, Lincoln High School district in Rhode Island, New Richmond School District in Ohio, Shawnigan Lake School in Canada and Pueblo County School District in Colorado. Tatum High School in New Mexico banned cell phone use from the school due to Yik Yak, and the Student Government Association at Emory University in Georgia attempted to ban the app across campus, but failed to do so after immense backlash from students. Students at Colgate University staged a three-day protest in September 2014 substantially driven by racist messages on Yik Yak.

On May 13, 2015, Santa Clara University President Michael Engh released a statement to all students after several racist remarks were posted on Yik Yak. He wrote, “Hate speech, not to be confused with free speech, has no place at Santa Clara University, because it violates the dignity and respect with which each member of our community is entitled to be treated. Hurtful comments directed at individuals or groups diminish us all and create a divisive atmosphere of distrust and suspicion.”

On October 3, 2014, The Huffington Post published an editorial by Ryan Chapin Mach titled "Why Your College Campus Should Ban Yik Yak", which asserted that Yik Yak's anonymous messaging boards "are like bathroom stalls without toilets. They're useless, they're sources of unhelpful or harmful conversations, and they're a complete eyesore."

To remedy the cases of bullying in middle and high schools around the country, Droll and Buffington amended the application to include geofences that work in the background. These unseen fences disable the application within their defined borders. At first, these boundaries were installed manually by the developers, but it quickly became clear they would need outside assistance. They found this assistance in a Vermont-based company known as Maponics. Maponics “builds and defines geographic boundaries.” They happened to already have nearly 85% of the country's high schools mapped, making it easy to block access to Yik Yak in those areas. The fences disabled the app on all middle and high school grounds throughout the country. If the app is opened within one of these areas the user is displayed a message along the lines of: “it looks like you’re trying to use Yik Yak on a middle school or high school grounds. Yik Yak is intended for people college-aged and above. The app is disabled in this area.”

The frequency of bullying and harassment that happened on Yik Yak might have been exaggerated by media stories citing specific incidents. Researchers have identified how Yik Yak is mostly used as a positive way to explore racial, ethnic, and sexual identities and to build a sense of community on campus. Others have identified how Yik Yak gives marginalized students a voice on campus.

In December 2014, security researchers discovered and demonstrated a potential attack on the service, where a Yik Yak user could have their account compromised and be deanonymised (having their identity revealed) if an attacker was using the same Wi-Fi network.

In 2015, Yik Yak gained attention by being the subject of preventing a suicide attempt at the College of William and Mary.

In February 2015, Yik Yak was exposed for systematically downvoting and deleting posts that mention competitors. The automatic system downvoted and deleted any posts that contained words that associated with names of other apps used by university students, including "fade", "unseen", "erodr", and "sneek". The downvoting algorithm, which assigned downvotes on regular intervals until the posts were deleted, appeared to be designed to mislead users to thinking that their posts were unpopular amongst peers, rather than censored by Yik Yak itself.

In March 2015, a student at Woodward Academy attempted suicide after receiving bullying posts on YikYak.

In April 2015, students at University of Michigan rallied to have YikYak banned after a suicide note was posted.

In November 2015, a 19 year old Washington College student committed suicide because of people talking about him inappropriately on the app.

In December 2015, the SLOG and The Seattle Times reported that a Western Washington University student had been arrested and released on bail after calling for the lynching of the student body president of the university. The racist threats were posted on Yik Yak.

In February 2022, after YikYak was revived a student at the University of Vermont was defamed of assaulting another student.

In April 2022, an investigation took place at Ferris State University where people were told to commit self-harm and to commit suicide.

In 2022, a West Virginia University student threatened suicide after people at the University spread misinformation about him. The people who spread misinformation were arrested. A year later, a threat for a school shooting was posted on YikYak also from WVU.

In January 2024, Harvard released a statement telling students to "tamp down" with the releasement of "concerning content" following complaints of antisemitic messages on YikYak. They encouraged the website to be moderated and emphasized that messages from the site are not endorsed by Harvard University.

In April 2024, Connecticut College students and faculty raised concerns over an increase in cyberbullying on Yik Yak. Reports cited anonymous posts containing personal attacks and harassment, prompting discussions about the platform's impact on campus culture.

== Dissolution of original company ==
During 2016, use of Yik Yak declined severely, by 76% over 2015. This limited its former projected growth potential, and in December 2016, Yik Yak laid off 60 percent of its workers. Based on a report by The Verge, the community, marketing, design, and product teams were all deeply affected. In addition to the aforementioned manipulation of content by corporate, the presence of extensive cyberbullying on the site was a primary cause of this decline in usage. However, TechCrunch pointed out that "any forum offering users anonymity and a means of chatting" would have the potential to be "plagued by cyberbullies".

In April 2017, the company announced its closure. The mobile payment operator Square Inc purchased what remained of the organization for $1m and stripped the company of its assets and integrated Yik Yak's engineers into their operations.

== See also ==
- Nearby
- Skout
- Whisper
