= Adii Pienaar =

South African entrepreneur and software developer (born 1986)

- Born: Adii Pienaar; 7 January 1985 (age 41); Cape Town, South Africa
- Education: Stellenbosch University
- Occupations: Entrepreneur; Programmer
- Years active: 2007- present
- Known for: Software, e-commerce, and technology startups
- Title: Co-founder at WooThemes, WooCommerce, Conversio, Cogsy and Ubundi

Adii Pienaar (born 7 January 1985), is a South African technology entrepreneur and software developer. In 2008, he co-founded WooThemes, a company that developed commercial themes and plugins for the WordPress. Pienaar was later involved in the development of WooCommerce, an open-source e-commerce plugin for WordPress launched in 2011 that, by January 2020, was estimated to be used by approximately 3.9 million websites. Pienaar founded Public Beta in 2013, Receiptful in 2014 (later renamed Conversio, which was acquired by Campaign Monitor Group in 2019), and co-founded Cogsy in 2020, which was acquired by Mayple in 2023. He founded the South African AI venture studio Ubundi in 2025. His work has focused on software, e-commerce infrastructure, and commerce operations platforms.

== Biography ==
Pienaar was born on 7 January 1986 and raised in Cape Town, South Africa. During his teenage years, Pienaar assisted in the family business and developed an early interest in software and business operations, his father owned a computer retail business in Brackenfell and worked as a programmer.

Pienaar completed secondary education in South Africa and matriculated in 2003. He went on to earn a Bachelor of Accounting degree at Stellenbosch University from 2004 to 2007. He later completed a Bachelor of Commerce Honours degree in business strategy at the same university in 2007.

== Ventures ==
=== WooThemes and WooCommerce ===
While at Stellenbosch University, Pienaar worked on web-based projects, this led to offering WordPress development and consulting services to support himself financially. His first premium WordPress theme, Premium News, was in 2007.

In 2008, Pienaar formally co-founded WooThemes with Magnus Jepson and Mark Forrester. The company focused on building and selling premium themes and plugins for WordPress. WooThemes expanded its operations in 2009, hiring its first employees as demand for its products increased.

In 2011, the company later shifted its primary focus to e-commerce and developed, WooCommerce, an open-source WordPress plugin that enables users to create and manage e-commerce stores. By January 2020, WooCommerce was estimated to be in use on approximately 3.9 million websites.

Pienaar served as CEO of WooThemes until May 2013. Later that year, he sold his ownership stake in the company and exited operational involvement. In 2015, WooThemes was acquired by Automattic, the parent company of WordPress.com.

=== Public Beta ===
In 2013, Pienaar founded Public Beta, an online community aimed at supporting entrepreneurs through shared knowledge and peer engagement. The platform launched and generated early revenue, but development was later paused as Pienaar stepped back from the project.

=== Conversio ===
In 2014, Pienaar founded Receiptful, a software platform focused on using transactional email receipts as a marketing and customer engagement channel for e-commerce businesses. He developed Receiptful to integrate with it the Stripe payment processor, later, it was renamed to Conversio and expanded to support major e-commerce systems including WooCommerce and Shopify. In 2019, Conversio was acquired by Campaign Monitor, an American email marketing company.

=== Cogsy ===
In 2020, Pienaar co-founded Cogsy, a commerce operations platform designed to help businesses manage inventory, demand forecasting, and supply chain processes. The company targeted small and medium-sized consumer goods businesses operating in online and multichannel retail. Cogsy was acquired by Mayple in 2023.

=== Automattic and Ubundi ===
Pienaar joined Automattic in January 2024, he served as General Manager of the company’s “Other Bets” division, overseeing a portfolio of products including Tumblr, Day One, Pocket Casts, and Gravatar. He remained at Automattic until June 2025.

Following his departure, Pienaar founded Ubundi, an AI-focused venture studio based in South Africa.
