= WP Engine =

WordPress hosting and technology company

- Type: Private
- Industry: Web hosting
- Founded: 2010
- Founders: Jason Cohen, Ben Metcalfe
- Headquarters: Austin, Texas
- Key people: Heather Brunner (CEO), Jason Cohen (CIO)
- Owner: Silver Lake
- Website: wpengine.com

WP Engine is an American hosting company that provides hosting services for websites built on the open-source content management system WordPress. It was founded by Jason Cohen in 2010 and is headquartered in Austin, Texas.

== History ==
WP Engine's main function is allowing businesses and organizations to build, host, and manage websites powered by WordPress.

WP Engine was founded by Jason Cohen and Ben Metcalfe in 2010. Prior to founding WP Engine, Cohen was the founder of the software company SmartBear Software. In May 2013, WP Engine hired former Bazaarvoice COO Heather Brunner as its COO. Brunner was eventually appointed the company's CEO in October 2013, with Cohen assuming the position of CTO. WP Engine hired Lee McClendon, formerly of SolarWinds, as its first Senior Vice President of Global Engineering in 2017.

WP Engine expanded into Europe in 2016, establishing offices in Limerick, Ireland. In 2019, the company expanded its offices into The Domain, a mixed-use development in Austin, Texas. In addition, WP Engine also expanded its offices into the Limerick city centre in 2023.

In 2018, WP Engine sold majority of its stakes to Silver Lake for investing $250 million. At the time they had 75,000 customers.

In 2021, the company reorganized its business into three service lines: enterprise-size business, small to medium-size business and international business.

In 2022, WP Engine announced that it was ending support for configuring sites using .htaccess files. WP Engine also announced the launch of Atlas, its headless WordPress solution, in the same year. The Atlas platform includes Atlas Blueprints, which provides developers with free website templates designed by professionals, and Atlas Sandbox, which allows users to create prototype headless WordPress projects. In March 2024, WP Engine Introduced AI-Powered Search for WordPress Sites.

WP Engine launched its platform on Microsoft Azure in 2022.

WP Engine formed a partnership with digital agency Granite Digital to expand its presence in Ireland in 2023.

Annually, WP Engine holds WP Engine DE{CODE}, a developer conference centered around sharing technical knowledge with the WordPress community.

== WordPress dispute and lawsuit ==
During the week preceding September 22, 2024, Matt Mullenweg—founder of WordPress.com—began speaking negatively about rival WP Engine. Mullenweg gave a speech at WordCamp US 2024 that argued that WP Engine had made meager contributions to WordPress compared to Automattic, criticized WP Engine's significant ties to private equity, and called for a boycott, sparking internet controversy. In response, WP Engine issued a cease and desist against what it characterized as defamation and extortion, attributing his attacks to WP Engine's refusal to pay Automattic "a significant percentage of its gross revenues – tens of millions of dollars in fact – on an ongoing basis" for what it claimed were necessary trademark licensing fees (later clarified as 8% of all revenue, payable in gross or in salaries for its own employees working under Automattic's direction, combined with a clause that would have prohibited forking) for the "WordPress" name. Automattic responded by sending its own cease and desist the next day, citing the trademark issue. On October 2, 2024, WP Engine sued Automattic and Mullenweg for extortion and abuse of power, which the defendants denied.

As a result of the dispute, WordPress.org blocked WP Engine and affiliates from accessing its servers—which include security updates, the plugin and theme repository, and more—on September 25, 2024. This was a day after its trademark policy was updated to advise against usage of "WP" "in a way that confuses people", listing WP Engine as an example. Following backlash, access to WordPress.org was temporarily restored until October 1 to allow WP Engine to build its own mirror sites two days later, which the company did. On the 12th, WordPress.org replaced the listing of WP Engine's Advanced Custom Fields (ACF) plugin on the WordPress.org plugin directory with their own version called "Secure Custom Fields" citing a guideline that empowers the foundation to "make changes to a plugin, without developer consent, in the interest of public safety". While Automattic claimed this was a fork, it used the same product slug and update mechanism, essentially forcing the millions of users of ACF (maintained by WP Engine) to automatically switch to SCF (maintained by Automattic) on their next update, with no warning this would happen. This has been compared to a supply chain attack , and was the basis in WPE's lawsuit for claims that included violations of the Computer Fraud and Abuse Act (CFAA).

On October 7, 2024, to align the company's stance, Mullenweg announced that 159 employees—8.4% of Automattic—had quit in exchange for a severance package of $30,000 or six months of salary, whichever is higher, with the condition that the resigned would not be able to return. The next week, another offer of nine months' salary was made in an attempt to placate those who could not quit for financial reasons, though with only four hours to respond and the added term of being excluded from the WordPress.org community.

On December 10, 2024, a preliminary injunction was issued by judge Araceli Martínez-Olguín of the District Court for the Northern District of California stating that Automattic and Matt Mullenweg must cease blocking, disabling, and interfering with WP Engine and its associates’ access to WordPress.org.

In February 2025, a class action lawsuit was filed by a WP Engine customer, accusing Automattic and Mullenweg of "deliberately abusing their power and control over the WordPress ecosystem to purposefully, deliberately, and repeatedly disrupt contracts", stating that the company's interference with WP Engine's operations caused disruptions in the maintenance and security of customer's own websites.

== Acquisitions ==
- Studio Press (Theme Developer), June 2018
- Flywheel (Hosting Company), June 2019
- Block Lab (Plugin), 2020
- Frost (WordPress Theme), 2021
- Delicious Brains (Plugin Developer), June 2021
- NitroPack (IT Company), July 2024
