= Akismet =

Spam filtering service

- Owner: Automattic
- Creator: Matt Mullenweg
- Website: akismet.com
- Commercial: Yes
- Registration: Required
- Launched: October 25, 2005; 20 years ago
- Current status: Online

Akismet is a service that filters spam from comments, trackbacks, and contact form messages. The filter operates by combining information about spam captured on all participating sites and then using those spam rules to block future spam. Akismet is offered by Automattic, the company behind WordPress.com. Akismet was launched on October 25, 2005.

== History ==
The founder of Automattic, Matt Mullenweg, says that he decided to create Akismet so that his mother could blog in safety. In 2005, there were discussions about how to deal with comment spam, and only a few plug-ins were available for that purpose at the time. Mullenweg's first attempt was a JavaScript plug-in that modified the comment form and hid fields, but within hours of its launch spammers downloaded it, figured out how it worked, and bypassed it.

In late 2005, Mullenweg launched the Akismet plug-in for WordPress. Each time someone posts a comment to a participating website, Akismet checks it against all the comments in the database. If it is spam, it is deleted. If spam gets through and a user marks it as spam, the comment is added to the database so the pool of spam comments widens, making Akismet increasingly effective over time.

== Using Akismet ==
Akismet was originally developed to integrate with a plug-in for WordPress. The Akismet plug-in has been included by default in all WordPress builds since version 2.0 and activated in all WordPress.com-hosted blogs.

A public Akismet API has resulted in third-party plug-ins for other platforms. One is an official Akismet plug-in release for the open source internet forum software Discourse.

To use Akismet, it is necessary to obtain an API key. This key is necessary for a site to communicate with the Akismet servers.

Akismet is a cloud-based tool.

== Development and distribution ==
Released under the terms of the GNU General Public License, the Akismet plug-in is free software, although the code to the Akismet system itself (and the nature of the algorithm used) has not been released. The Akismet service is free for personal use and, as of November 2021, commercial plans start at less than $10 per month.
