= Distinguishable interfaces =

Distinguishable interfaces use computer graphic principles to automatically generate easily distinguishable appearance for computer data.

Although the desktop metaphor revolutionized user interfaces, there is evidence that a spatial layout alone does little to help in locating files and other data; distinguishable appearance is also required. Studies have shown that average users have considerable difficulty finding files on their personal computers, even ones that they created the same day. Search engines do not always help, since it has been found that users often know of the existence of a file without being able to specify relevant search terms. On the contrary, people appear to incrementally search for files using some form of context.

Recently researchers and web developers have argued that the problem is the lack of distinguishable appearance: in the traditional computer interface most objects and locations appear identical. This problem rarely occurs in the real world, where both objects and locations generally have easily distinguishable appearance. Discriminability was one of the recommendations in the ISO 9241-12 recommendation on presentation of information on visual displays (part of the overall report on Ergonomics of Human System Interaction), however it was assumed in that report that this would be achieved by manual design of graphical symbols.

== VisualIDs, semanticons, and identicons ==
The mass availability of computer graphics supported the introduction of approaches that make better use of the brain's "visual hardware", by providing individual files and other abstract data with distinguishable appearance. This idea initially appeared in strictly academic VisualIDs and Semanticons works, but the web community has explored and rapidly adopted similar ideas, such as the Identicon.

The VisualIDs project automatically generated icons for files or other data based on a hash of the data identifier, so the icons had no relation to the content or meaning of the data. It was argued not only that generating meaningful icons is unnecessary (their user study showed rapid learning of the arbitrary icons), but also that basing icons on content is actually incorrect ("contrasting visualization with visual identifiers").

The Semanticons project developed by Setlur et al. demonstrated an algorithm to create icons that reflect the content of files. In this work the name, location and content of a file are parsed and used to retrieve related image(s) from an image database. These are then processed using a Non-photorealistic rendering technique in order to generate graphical icons.

Developer Don Park introduced the identicon library for making a visual icon from a hash of a data identifier. This initial public implementation has spawned a large number of implementations for various environments. In particular, identicons are now being used as default visual user identifiers (avatars) for several widely used systems. They are also used as a complement to Gravatars, which are pre-existing avatar images created or chosen by users, instead of automatically generated images. (see #External links).

== Current research ==
While current web practice has followed the semantics-free approach of VisualIDs, recent research has followed the semantics-based approach of Semanticons. Examples include using data mining principles to automatically create "intelligent icons" that reflect the contents of files and creating icons for music files that reflect audio characteristics or affective content.

== See also ==
- Favicon
