= .blog =

Internet top-level domain for blogs

blog
- Introduced: May 12, 2016; 9 years ago
- TLD type: Generic top-level domain
- Status: Active
- Sponsor: Automattic (WordPress.com)
- Intended use: Blogs
- Documents: Policies
- DNSSEC: Yes
- Registry website: my.blog

The domain name .blog is a generic top level domain (gTLD) in the Domain Name System of the Internet. Added in 2016, it is intended to be used for blogs.

== History ==
In late 2013, due to concerns over "name collisions", wherein companies could potentially be using some proposed gTLDs internally for their use, the ICANN halted progression of .blog and 24 other proposed gTLDs pending further review.

In 2015, the rights to the .blog TLD were auctioned off to Automattic Inc. for an estimated sum of US$19 million. The TLD became active on 12 May 2016.

In 2019, it was announced that Automattic will switch its backend registry provider for its .blog from Nominet to CentralNic with the goal to further advance .blog through tools and services available from CentralNic.
