= BuddyPress =

Open-source social networking software

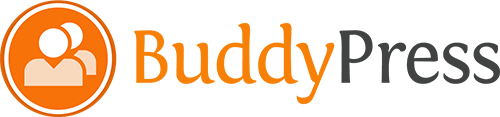

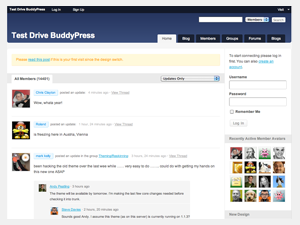
- Profile page for BuddyPress user
- Developer: The BuddyPress Team
- Stable release: 14.5.4 / October 23, 2026; 19 days ago
- Operating system: Cross-platform
- Platform: PHP, MySQL, WordPress
- Type: Blog publishing system, Social Networking
- License: GNU General Public License version 2
- Website: https://buddypress.org/

BuddyPress is an open-source social networking software package owned by Automattic since 2008. It is a plugin that can be installed on WordPress to transform it into a social network platform. BuddyPress is designed to allow schools, companies, sports teams, or any other niche community to start their own social network or communication tool.

BuddyPress inherits and expands on the functional elements of the WordPress engine including themes, plugins, and widgets. It is built on WordPress, so it is written using the same primary languages, PHP and MySQL.
