= Blumberg Capital =

American early-stage venture capital firm

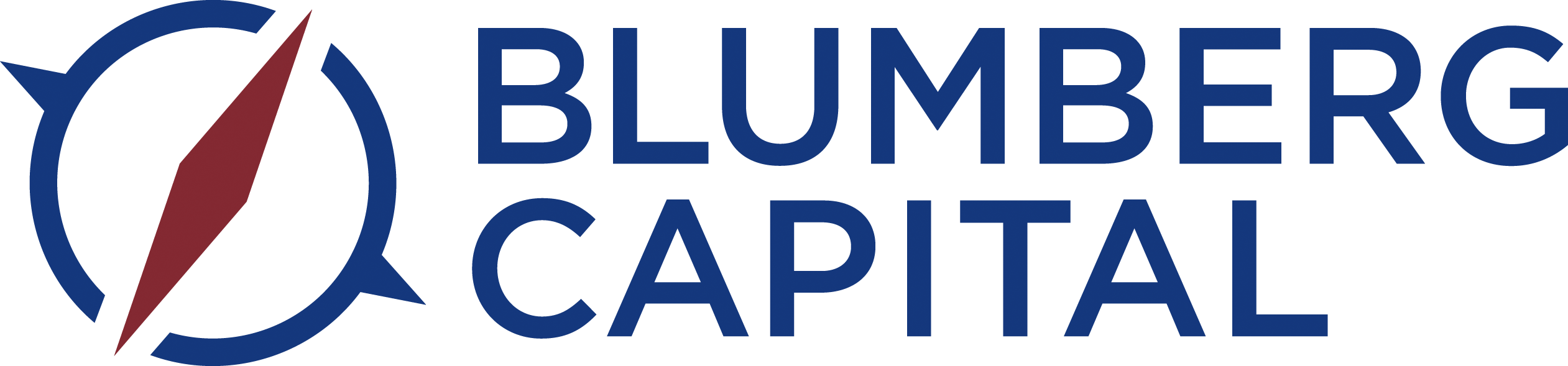
- Blumberg Capital Logo
- Type: Private
- Industry: Early Stage Venture Capital
- Founded: 1991
- Founder: David J. Blumberg
- Headquarters: Miami, Florida, U.S.A.
- Website: blumbergcapital.com

Blumberg Capital is an American venture capital firm based in Miami.

== History ==
Blumberg Capital was founded in 1991 by David J. Blumberg.

== Investments ==
Blumberg Capital was the first investor in now public companies such as Braze, DoubleVerify, Nutanix and Katapult.

On September 17, 2021, Blumberg Capital announced its fifth flagship fund, Blumberg Capital Fund V. The fund raised $225M, the most of any its four previous funds, bringing Blumberg Capital's total amount raised to over $750M.

Blumberg backed companies including Addepar, CaseStack, Check Point, Credorax, Deep Instinct, DSP Group, efi, eVoice, Fundbox, HootSuite, Lendio, Namogoo, Nutanix, Parse.ly, SQream DB, WorkJam.

In March 2025, Blumberg Capital and Viola Ventures co-led a $9 million seed funding round in Aryon Security, a company specializing in preventive cloud security. Blumberg Capital also participated in the company's $29 million Series A funding in June 2026.
