= Peter Joseph Heald =

British biochemist (1925–1996)

Dr Peter Joseph Heald FRSE (26 July 1925 – 3 October 1996) was a British biochemist, who was an expert on reproductive biochemistry.

== Life ==
He was born at Alderley Edge in Cheshire on 26 July 1925, the second of three sons. He was educated at Stockport School in Manchester. He then attended Manchester Institute of Technology graduating with honours in Chemistry in 1945.

In 1948 he moved to Scotland to join the Rowett Research Institute in Aberdeen as a Research Officer. Here he gained a doctorate (PhD) from Aberdeen University for his work on the fermentation of pentoses.

His first medical role was on the diagnostic staff at Maudsley Hospital in south London in 1952. He also then took on lecturing roles at the University of London. Growing fame gained him a travelling professorship to lecture at the Mayo Clinic in the United States.

In 1961 he returned to Britain and moved into the business world rather than academia, acting as Head of Animal Biochemistry at Twyfords. Here he worked on the reproductive system of chickens. During this period Manchester University awarded him an honorary doctorate (DSc). In 1966 he was made Professor of Biochemistry at the newly created University of Strathclyde In 1968 he was elected a Fellow of the Royal Society of Edinburgh. His proposers were Anthony Elliot Ritchie, Peter Pauson, Sir David Cuthbertson, Norman Davidson, and Reginald Brettauer Fisher.

In 1978 he joined what then in Britain was called the brain drain and moved to St Johns in Newfoundland as dean of science in the Memorial University of Newfoundland. Here he established a link with the Logy Bay Marine Laboratory and began to establish links between academia and commerce in the world of marine food production. He also became Chairman of the Atlantic Provinces Inter-Universities Council for Science.

He retired to Church Stretton in Shropshire in 1990 but moved to Helensburgh in Scotland in 1994. He died in Helensburgh on 3 October 1996. He was cremated and his ashes are buried near his holiday cottage on Mull.

== Publications ==
- Phosphorus Metabolism of the Brain (1960)
- Biotechnica and Biophysica
- Atlantic Science (monthly newsletter)

== Family ==
In 1951 he married Kathleen. They had a daughter, Margaret, who became a doctor in Norway, and two sons, Richard Heald, a banker, and Jonathan Heald, a pilot.
