= Mike Little =

English web developer (born 1962)

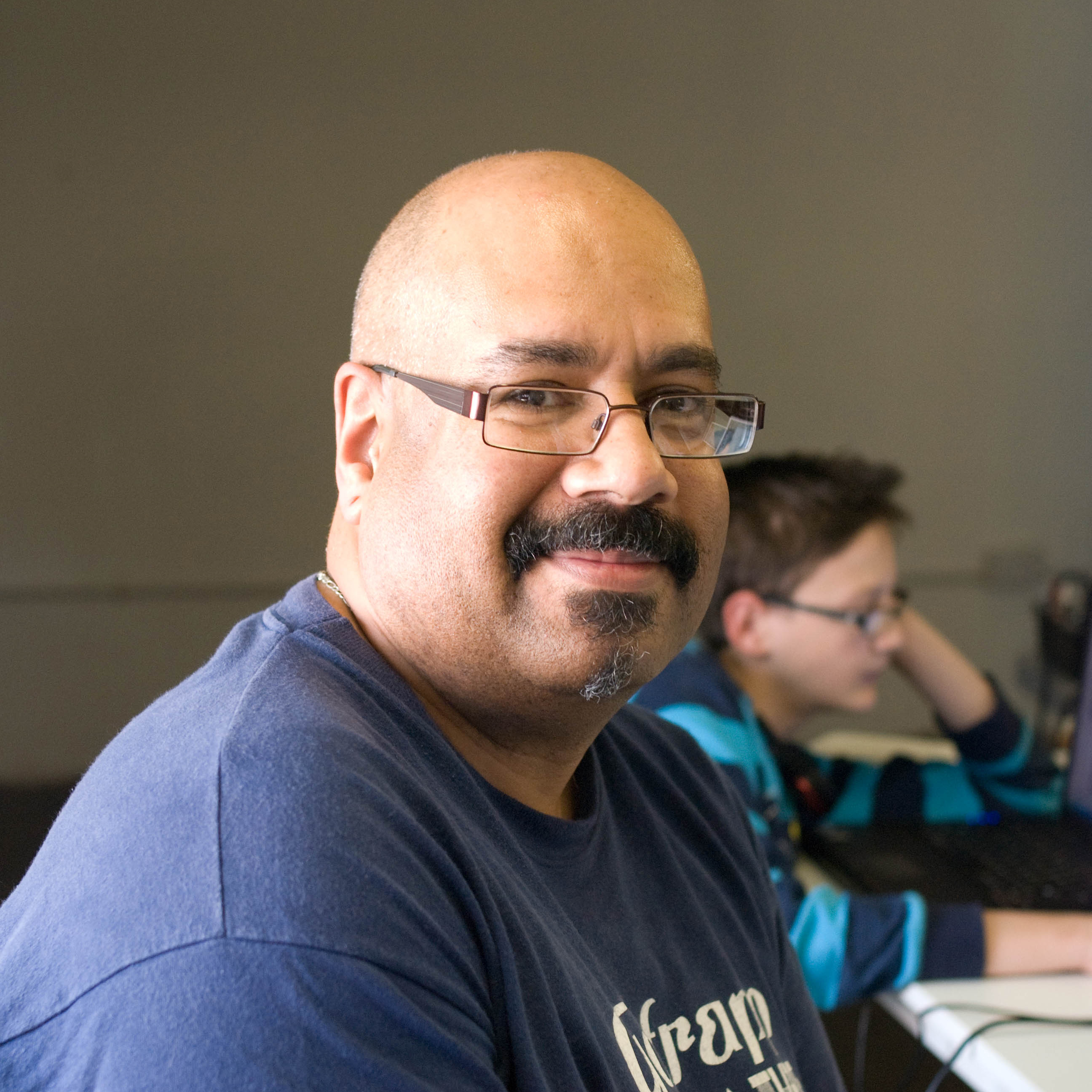
- Mike Little at Young Rewired State 2012
- Born: 12 May 1962 (age 64)
- Education: Stockport School
- Occupation: Web developer
- Known for: WordPress
- Children: 1
- Website: mikelittle.org

Mike Little (born 12 May 1962) is an English web developer and writer. He is the co-founder of the free and open source web publishing software WordPress.

== Biography ==
Mike Little was born in Manchester, England in 1962 to a Nigerian father, who was a mathematics lecturer and musician, and an English mother who worked as a primary school teacher. Little was placed into foster care when he was four months of age, and was later adopted by the same family. He grew up on a council estate in Brinnington, Stockport, and was educated at Stockport School.

In 2003, Little and Matt Mullenweg started working on a project in which they built on b2/cafelog and later named it WordPress, releasing the first version on 27 May 2003.

Little states that, despite not being invited to join his co-founder's for-profit business Automattic, he and Mullenweg remain on good terms. He clarified: "I don’t want it to sound like he cheated me out of something or ripped me off in some way. He didn’t."

In June 2013, Little was awarded the SAScon's "Outstanding Contribution to Digital" award for his part in co-founding and developing WordPress.

Little has been described as "modest" and living in "virtual anonymity". He has one daughter. He identifies as a follower of Stoicism and a humanist, and in 2021, he became a patron of charity Humanists UK.

== Bibliography ==
- Douglass, Robert T.; Little, Mike; Smith, Jared W. (2006). Building Online Communities With Drupal, PhpBB, and WordPress
