= Minda Honey =

American author

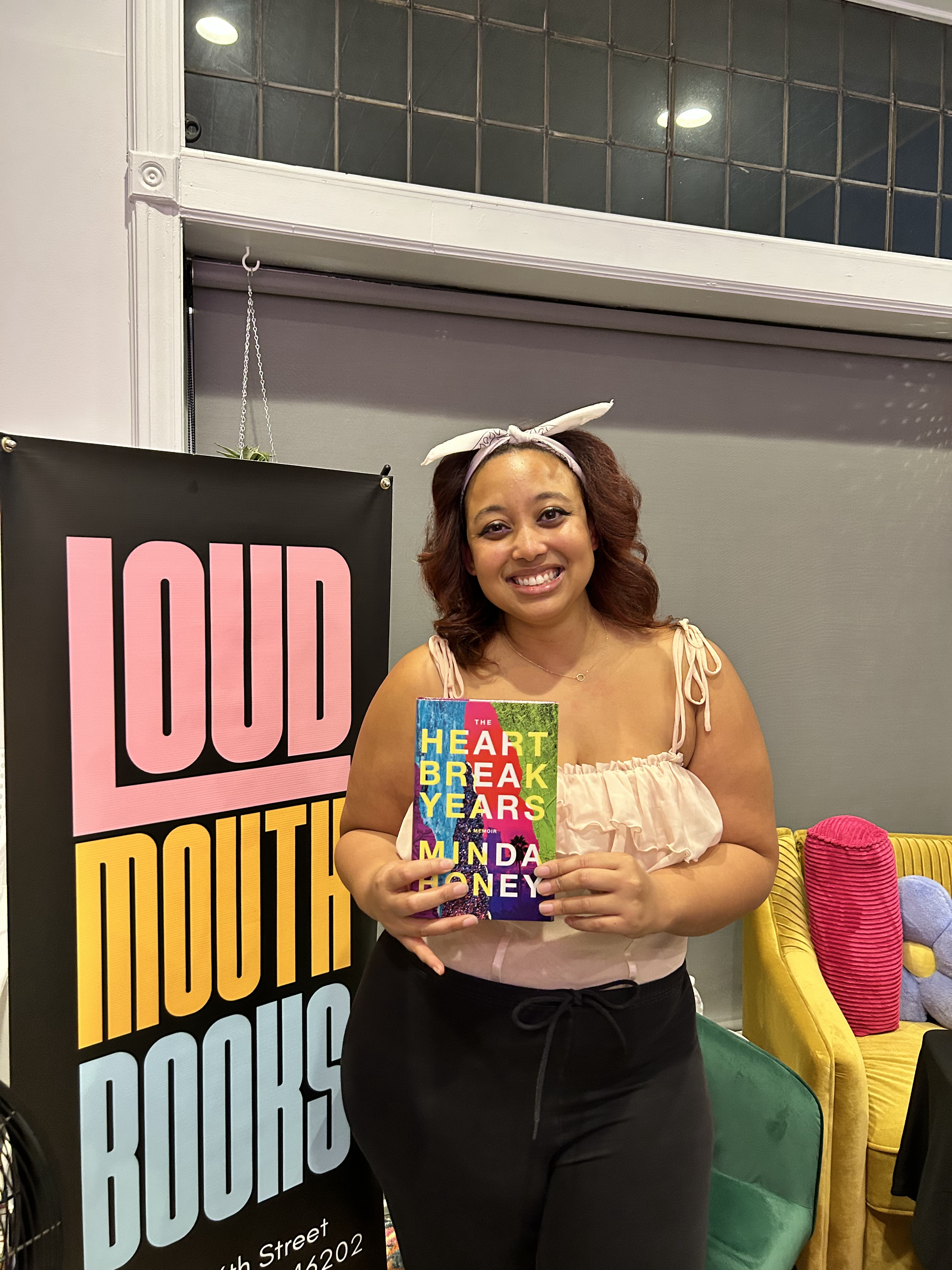
- Born: 1985 (age 40–41); Louisville, KY
- Education: University of California, Riverside
- Known for: Author of The Heartbreak Years
- Website: https://www.mindahoney.com/

Minda Honey (born 1985) is an American author and columnist, she is best known for her debut memoir, The Heartbreak Years.

== Life ==
Honey was born in Louisville, Kentucky in 1985, and she holds a Master of Fine Art from the University of California, Riverside. After her time in California, Honey returned to Louisville, where she currently resides.

== Career ==
Minda Honey is the founder of the indie magazine Taunt and the editor of Black Joy at Reckon News. Additionally, her writing has been featured in the Los Angeles Review of Books, Teen Vogue, The Guardian, the Oxford American, and The Washington Post. Honey has a series of essays on politics and dating on the nonfiction storytelling website, Longreads. Honey's work appears in the anthologies A Measure of Belonging, Burn It Down, Sex & the Single Woman, and Black Told. Minda Honey formerly led the Bachelor of Fine Arts in Creative Writing Program at Spalding University in Louisville.

Honey's debut novel, The Heartbreak Years was released in 2023 from White Rain Book House.

== Works ==
- The Heartbreak Years
- Anthologies
  - A Measure of Belonging: Twenty-One Writers of Color on the New American South
  - Burn It Down: Women Writing About Anger
  - Sex and the Single Woman: 24 Writers Reimagine Helen Gurley Brown's Cult Classic
