= Simplenote =

Note-taking application

- Original author: Simperium
- Developer: Automattic
- Operating system: Android; Linux; Microsoft Windows; iOS; macOS; web
- Type: Note-taking | Markdown
- License: Clients: GPL-2.0-only; Server: Proprietary
- Website: simplenote.com

Simplenote is a note-taking application with Markdown support. In addition to being accessible via most web browsers, cross-platform apps are available on Android, Linux, Windows, iOS, and macOS.

Simplenote has an externally accessible API, allowing other clients to be written: macOS Dashboard widget DashNote; nvPY, a cross-platform Simplenote client; amongst others. In addition, the macOS program Notational Velocity and the Windows utility ResophNotes can also sync with Simplenote.

== History ==
Simplenote was originally developed by Simperium in 2008.

Simplenote Premium was introduced on November 23, 2009. It removed ads and added extra features such as syncing Simplenote with Dropbox.

Automattic acquired Simperium and Simplenote on January 24, 2013. In September, Automattic released an Android version and later relaunched Simplenote, which suspended the premium service and removed ads for all users.

In May 2016, an official client for Linux for Simplenote was released.

Automattic open sourced code for its Android, Electron, iOS, and macOS Simplenote apps in August 2016, making all its client apps open source.

== Reception ==
The application was reviewed by Mac Life, and others, reviewed in the book Lifehacker: The Guide to Working Smarter, Faster, and Better, and covered in the book The Business of iPhone and iPad App Development.

Daniel Aleksandersen of Ctrl.blog said:

I like Simplenote and I use it every day. I’m not super-happy about the many tiny issues and inconsistencies, but it’s one of the better note-taking platforms available. Simplenote’s many apps need to iron out their differences and become a little more uniform. The differences mostly seem to be caused by one team not knowing/caring what the other was doing. The features and design are excellent but the execution isn’t uniform across platforms and leaves something to be desired on all of them.

I’d recommend Simplenote to pretty much anyone, but with the caveat that they’d take the time to learn about note-recovering methods (restore-from-trash, revision history, backups, hope) before committing to the platform.
