= Lendio =

United States small business loan company (e. 2011)

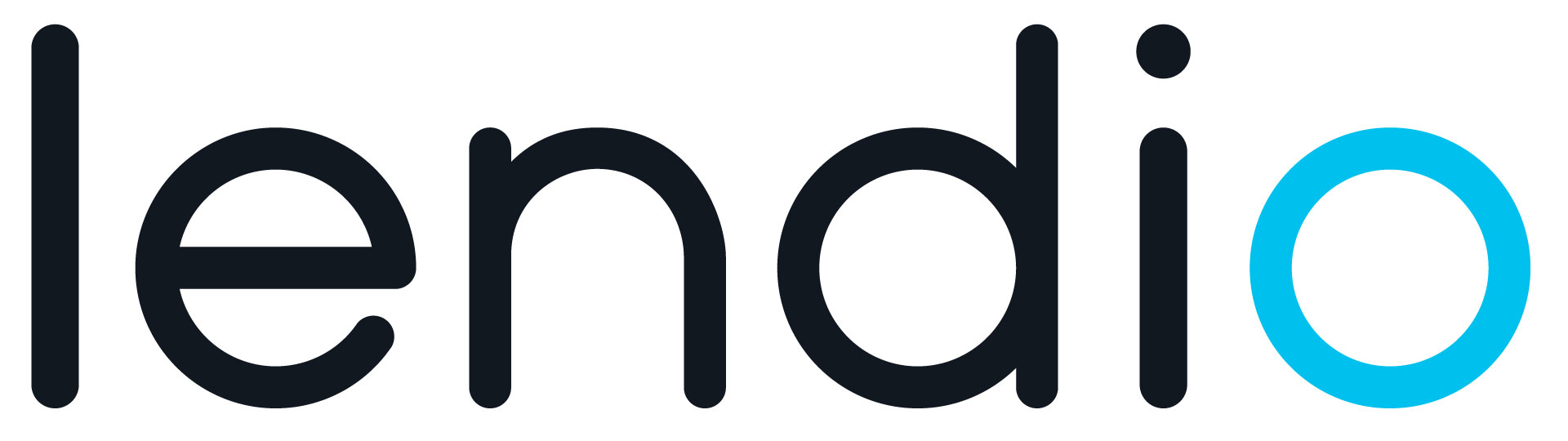
- Lendio logo
- Industry: Small business loans
- Predecessor: FundingUniverse
- Founded: 2011
- Founder: Brock Blake, CEO; Trent Miskin, CGO; Brett Child, EVP Sales
- Headquarters: South Jordan, United States
- Key people: Chad Iverson, COO Ben Davis, Chief Revenue Officer
- Website: www.lendio.com

Utah-based Lendio (formerly Funding Universe), founded in 2011 by Brock Blake and Trent Miskin, is a free online loan marketplace in the U.S. targeting small business owners.

== History ==
Lendio's predecessor, Funding Universe (FundingUniverse) was a pay-to-pitch on Inc.'s list of "the fastest-growing privately held companies". They stopped charging "amid the criticism".

The name FundingUniverse was an outgrowth of the FundingUtah that Blake and Miskin began in 2006.

Founded in 2006 as FundingUtah, it became FundingUniverse and, by 2011, Lendio. CEO Blake has served in that role to each.

Founded in 2011, Lendio facilitated its first loan in Q4 2013. In 2014, it coordinated $12.4 million in funding to more than 400 small business owners. By 2015, the company had expanded to $128 million in financing.

In October 2016, Lendio raised $20 million in funding from Comcast Ventures and Stereo Capital with participation from existing investors Napier Park, Blumberg Capital, Tribeca Venture Partners, and North Hill Ventures. By 2016, it had delivered over $250 million in total funding to more than 10,000 small businesses.

The Lendio Franchising program was launched in early 2017. As of 2018, it had facilitated $430 million to over 7,000 small businesses in the U.S.

In Q2 2018, Lendio reported 90% year-over-year revenue growth. In October 2018, Lendio announced it had serviced $1B of total loans to over 51,000 small businesses across the country, providing $3.8B in economic output.

== Lending platform ==
Lendio's platform reviews metrics including the business's financial projections, use of funds, industry, and monthly revenue to find loans option for borrowers. The platform uses a series of questions to predict which loan type will most likely match a business owner's qualifications. Each borrower is also assigned a funding manager to answer questions through the entire process. Lendio's online application process takes an average of 15 minutes to complete, compared to an average of 25 hours filling out traditional lending applications.

Small business owners are offered financing options including credit cards, lines of credit, short-term specialty loans and long-term traditional loans.
