= NextGEN Gallery =

NextGEN Gallery is a free and open-source image management plugin maintained by Imagely for the WordPress content management system. It has been downloaded 38 million times (as of October 2023), making it the fifth most popular plugin for WordPress.

== Licensing ==
Like WordPress, NextGEN is released and governed by the GNU General Public License. NextGEN's source code is publicly available from its GitHub repository.

== See also ==
- WordPress
- Content Management System
- Plugin Architecture
- Free and open-source software
- GNU General Public License
