= Brock Blake =

American businessman

- Education: Brigham Young University
- Occupation: Founder & CEO of Lendio
- Children: 4

Brock Blake is founder and CEO of Lendio, an online marketplace for small business loans. Blake is an Inc. 500 CEO, speaker, and Forbes columnist.

He was educated at Brigham Young University's Marriott School of Management. He lives in Utah with his wife and four children.

== Career ==
Blake founded FundingUtah in 2006, which became FundingUniverse and, by 2011, Lendio. CEO Blake has served in that role to each. has served in that role to each.

Blake founded Lendio after witnessing how small businesses struggled to get capital from U.S. banks after the 2008 financial crisis. Lendio's platform enables small business owners to fill out a free online loan application, then browse multiple loan products from a network of more than 75 lenders. In October 2018, Lendio announced it had serviced $1B in total loans to over 51,000 small businesses across the country. In the first month of the Paycheck Protection Program during the COVID-19 pandemic, Lendio onboarded hundreds of lenders to help facilitate what would eventually amount to $8 billion in loan approvals for over 100,000 businesses.

Blake also created a speed dating-style small business pitching event called CrowdPitch.

== Awards ==
Brock Blake has received several awards throughout his career, including:

- EY Entrepreneur Of The Year 2020 Utah Region Award Winners,
- Q Awards, 2020 Entrepreneur Of The Year: Brock Blake, Lendio
- Business Intelligence Group Small Business Executive of the Year, 2013
- Utah Venture Entrepreneur Forum Peak 100, 2015
- ETA Forty Under 40, received 2008.

== Philanthropy ==
Through Lendio, Blake has instituted numerous philanthropic efforts to give back to the small business community. For every loan facilitated on Lendio's marketplace platform, the company donates a percentage of funds to low-income entrepreneurs around the world through the nonprofit organization, Kiva. The program, Lendio Gives, typically awards loans in amounts from $150 to $5,000 to early stage small businesses in impoverished countries around the world. One hundred percent of every dollar the company lends to Kiva goes to funding loans.
