= Stockport School =

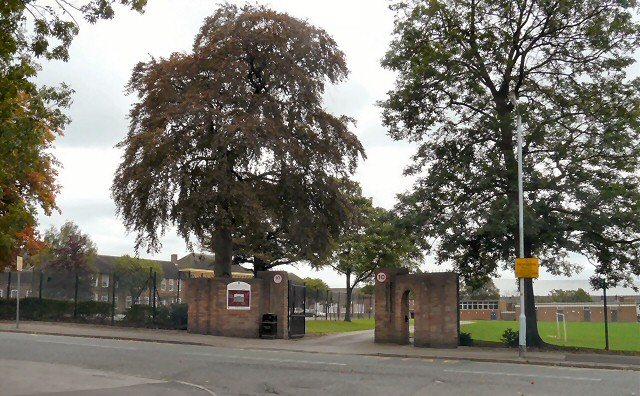

Location
- Mile End Lane; Stockport, SK2 6BW; England; 53.39157°N 2.1394°W

Information
- Type: Community school
- Motto: "Velis et Remis" (with Sails and Oars)
- Established: 1888
- Local authority: Stockport Council
- Department for Education URN: 106135 Tables
- Ofsted: Reports
- Headteacher: Ian Irwin
- Staff: 120
- Gender: Mixed
- Age: 11 to 16
- Enrolment: 1197 as of February 2020
- Capacity: 1200
- Website: stockportschool.net

Stockport School is a mixed 11–16 secondary school in Stockport, England.

== History ==
The school was established in 1888 and moved to its present site in 1938. In its time it has played many parts. In the 1880s Stockport was a hatting and cotton manufacturing town and education was provided by Stockport Sunday School and Mechanics Institutes. There were the old private grammar schools but the need was felt to have a technical school. As, it was felt, none of these classes was able to cope with the increasing technical demands of local industry. From 1884 local manufacturers and tradesmen agitated for some more advanced form of education for a Technical or Trade School. On 25 February 1887, Joseph Leigh, acting as Mayor convened a meeting, where Alderman Ephraim Hallam, proposed that to celebrate the 50th anniversary of Queen Victoria's reign "That it is desirable to establish a Technical and Art School in this town, to enable its inhabitants to acquire..........that special teaching requisite, to maintain its position amongst the industrial towns of this country." It was financed by subscription, then the Technical Instruction Act 1889 (52 & 53 Vict. c. 76) allows the town to finance it on the rates.

The Stockport Technical School in 1888, on a site on Greek Street, mainly delivered Adult Education in the evenings, being empty during the day. In 1892 the building was gifted under covenant to Stockport Borough Council. In 1896, it was opened during the day to boys and girls- there were 100 pupils; this was the Stockport Technical Day School (The Tec) and it is this that has evolved into the school today. The Education Act 1902 (Balfour Act) regularised secondary schools, and 'The Tec' complied and was renamed the Stockport Municipal Secondary School. The age of entry was lowered to 12 and fees were charged. In 1903 there were 250 boys and girls on roll. The school prepared students for 'School Cert'. In September 1908 the number on roll was 304 (some 139 boys and 165 girls). Over half the girls left to become student teachers, the bulk of the boys going into local industry, commerce or the professions; some entering university later. Boys and girls were taught separately, and in 1910 the Greek Street School, (or extension) was built and occupied by the girls. The war interrupted.

In 1927 the school opened its sixth form allowing students to matriculate. Accommodation was very crowded. A new school for the boys was planned at Mile End. It opened in 1938, and was named Stockport School. The war interrupted, but on its conclusion the Education Act 1944 (Butler Act) reorganised secondary education. Stockport School was deemed a boys grammar school, and losing its comprehensive intake, it remained as such until comprehensivisation. The first comprehensive intake was in 1973, and the school became a 11–18 non-selective boys school.

Stockport School had the first language laboratory installed in a school in the north of England during the 1960's, an innovation spearheaded by George MacDonald, Head of Spanish for over 20 years, after an arduous campaign for funding to the local council.

== Governance ==
Today it is a coeducational 11–16 community school administered by Stockport Metropolitan Borough Council.

== Academics ==
The school has a curriculum philosophy that is published online, that aims to give Key Stage 3 pupils (years 7–9) a broad foundations for their Key Stage 4 core subjects and options. The school operates a two-week cycle curriculum of 52 one-hour units.

== Lower School ==
All Key Stage 3 groups study English, Mathematics, Science, Religious Studies, Languages, Technology, Drama, Art, Music, ICT and Physical Education. There is some banding and setting. Modern languages are important; German, Spanish and French are taught, and the school has accredited International School status. Options are chosen in Year 9; these are GCSEs, BTECs and ASDAN courses.

== Upper School ==
The Year 10 and 11 curriculum is academic. Core English Baccalaureate GCSE subjects of English, English Literature, Mathematics, a Humanities subject of either Geography or History, and at least one Modern Foreign Language are studied, with either Combined Science or the three separate Sciences (Biology, Chemistry and Physics) to GCSE level. These are taught in ability sets while the single additional optional subjects are generally in Mixed ability groups.

== Notable former pupils ==
- Taylor Harwood-Bellis, Professional footballer
- Brandon Jackson, former Dean of Lincoln
- Simon Stephens, playwright
- Prof Peter Joseph Heald FRSE biochemist
- Peter Barkworth, actor
- Brian Rawlinson, actor and writer
- Nathan Aspinall, professional darts player
- Alan Gowling, professional footballer
- Mike Little, web developer and co-founder of WordPress
- Tom Ogden, lead vocalist of indie pop band Blossoms
- Joe Donovan, drummer of indie pop band Blossoms
- Josh Dewhurst, lead guitarist of indie pop band Blossoms
