= Nicholas Quah =

American journalist

- Born: 1989 or 1990 (age 35–36)
- Other names: Nick Quah
- Occupation: Journalist
- Employer: Vulture
- Known for: Writing about podcasts
- Notable work: Hot Pod Newsletter; Servant of Pod
- Awards: 2020 Antitrust Writing Award nominee; 2021 Fortune Creator 25
- Website: www.nicholasquah.com

Nicholas Quah is a journalist for Vulture and is the creator of the Nieman Lab newsletter Hot Pod News.

== Career ==
Quah was the creator of the Hotpods newsletter. Quah worked for BuzzFeed in 2015 while writing the newsletter. Vox Media acquired the Hotpod newsletter in 2021 as part of a plan to expand The Verge. Quah had been running the newsletter for almost seven years. After Hot Pod was acquired by The Verge, Quah started working at Vulture. Quah also hosts his own podcast called "Servant of Pod," which discusses the business side of podcasting. The show was a 2021 Webby Award honoree in the business category. Quah occasionally contributes podcast reviews and criticism to NPR's Fresh Air. He also wrote a book about the podcasting industry.

Quah provided commentary on the effects the COVID-19 pandemic has had on podcast consumption. For instance, Quah noted that podcast downloads decreased in March 2020, but that in late April 2020 downloads began increasing again. Jim Epstein criticized Quah for supporting government funded public broadcasting. Quah is in support of a decentralized federated business model for NPR because he believes that would allow for an increase in local reporting. Quah worked for Panoply and commented on the benefits of podcast networks. Quah covered the story about Gimlet Media unionizing. Quah opposed Luminary's paywalled business model saying that it "strikes at the ideological heart of the medium." Quah pointed out that a paywalled podcast company will have to be able to beat all the free alternatives in order to do well. Quah covered the plagiarism issues that Crime Junkie ran into. Quah has called the true crime genre the "bloody, beating heart of podcasting." Quah uses multiple podcasting applications but recommends Pocket Casts.

Quah is a juror for the Peabody Awards. Quah has written about how being on the Apple Podcast charts is often meaningless. Quah was an Antitrust Writing Award nominee in 2020. Quah was a 2021 Fortune Creator 25. Tom Jones wrote in Poynter that "No one analyzes the ins and outs of the podcast world better" Quah and that "no one [provides reliable coverage on podcasts] better than Vulture's Nicholas Quah."
