= Parse.ly =

American technology company

- Company type: Subsidiary
- Website type: Web analytics
- Available in: English
- Founded: New York City, New York, U.S
- Headquarters: New York City, New York, United States
- Area served: Worldwide
- Founders: Sachin Kamdar; Andrew Montalenti
- Key people: Sachin Kamdar; Andrew Montalenti
- Employees: 70
- Parent: Automattic
- Website: www.parse.ly
- Launched: December 2009
- Current status: Active

Parse.ly is a technology company that provides web analytics and content optimization software for online publishers. Parse.ly built three products, the Parse.ly Reader, the Parse.ly Publisher Platform, and the latest Parse.ly Dash, an analytics tool for large publishers.

== Overview ==
Parse.ly is a content optimization platform for online publishers. Parse.ly's product, Dash, is built on top of the Parse.ly platform. Dash parses articles on a publisher's site, and then analyzes them to identify data around metrics that are specific for publishers such as topics, authors, sections, and referrers. The technology it uses to do this is natural language processing, and has extracted over 350,000 unique topics from the URLs it has crawled. In addition to providing site analytics, Dash can show users what topics are resonating with people across the web through their webwide trends interface.

Parse.ly was founded by Sachin Kamdar and Andrew Montalenti out of DreamIt Ventures, an early stage startup accelerator program in Philadelphia and launched its first product, Parse.ly Reader, in September 2009.

== Funding ==
In May 2009, Parse.ly received $20k in seed funding from DreamIt Ventures. In December 2010, Parse.ly received $1.8M in Series A funding from Blumberg Capital, ff Venture Capital, Scott Becker (cofounder of Invite Media), Don Hutchison, Jonathan Axelrod, and Jeffrey Greenblatt.

In February 2021, Parse.ly was acquired by Automattic. The financial terms of the acquisition were not disclosed.
