= Matt Mullenweg =

American entrepreneur and web developer (born 1984)

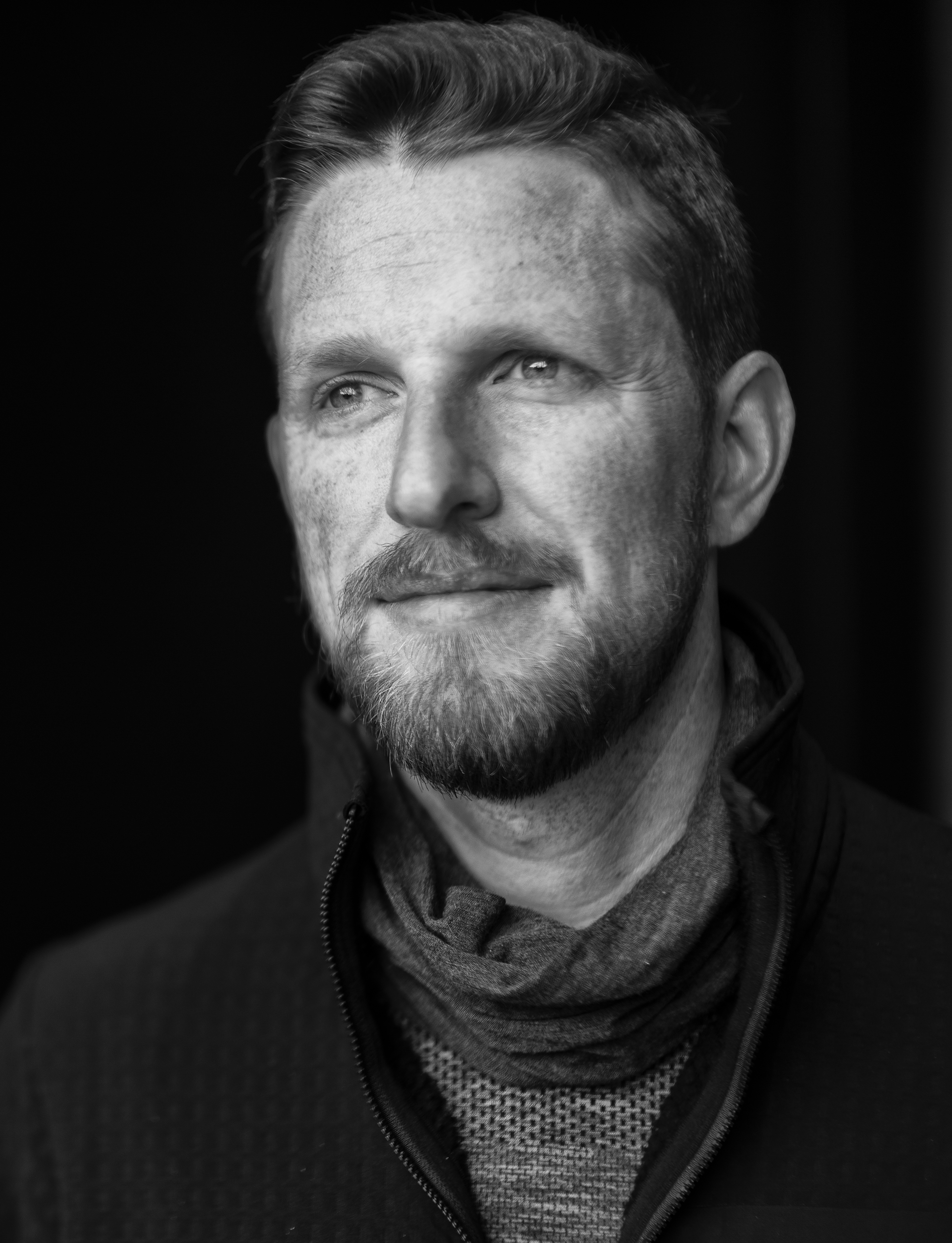
- Mullenweg in 2019
- Born: Matthew Charles Mullenweg; January 11, 1984 (age 42); Houston, Texas, U.S.
- Education: University of Houston
- Occupations: Web developer; Entrepreneur; Angel investor
- Organization: Automattic
- Known for: Co-founding WordPress
- Title: CEO, Automattic; Director, WordPress Foundation; Principal, Audrey Capital
- Website: ma.tt

Matthew Charles Mullenweg (born January 11, 1984) is an American web developer and entrepreneur. He is known as a co-founder of the free and open-source web publishing software WordPress, and the founder of Automattic.

== Early life and education ==
Mullenweg was born January 11, 1984, in Houston, Texas, to Chuck and Kathleen Mullenweg and grew up in the Willowbend neighborhood. His older sister was born in 1974. His father, who died in 2016, was a computer programmer who worked for Brown & Root, and encouraged his children to start using home computers at an early age. His mother was a stay-at-home mother. The Mullenwegs were raised Catholic. He attended Kinder High School for the Performing and Visual Arts, studying jazz and playing the saxophone. Mullenweg suffered from migraines as a child that forced him to miss extended periods of school. He attended the University of Houston for two years, studying philosophy and political science. He dropped out after his sophomore year in 2004 to work for CNET, which promised him that he could allocate time to the development of WordPress.

== Career ==
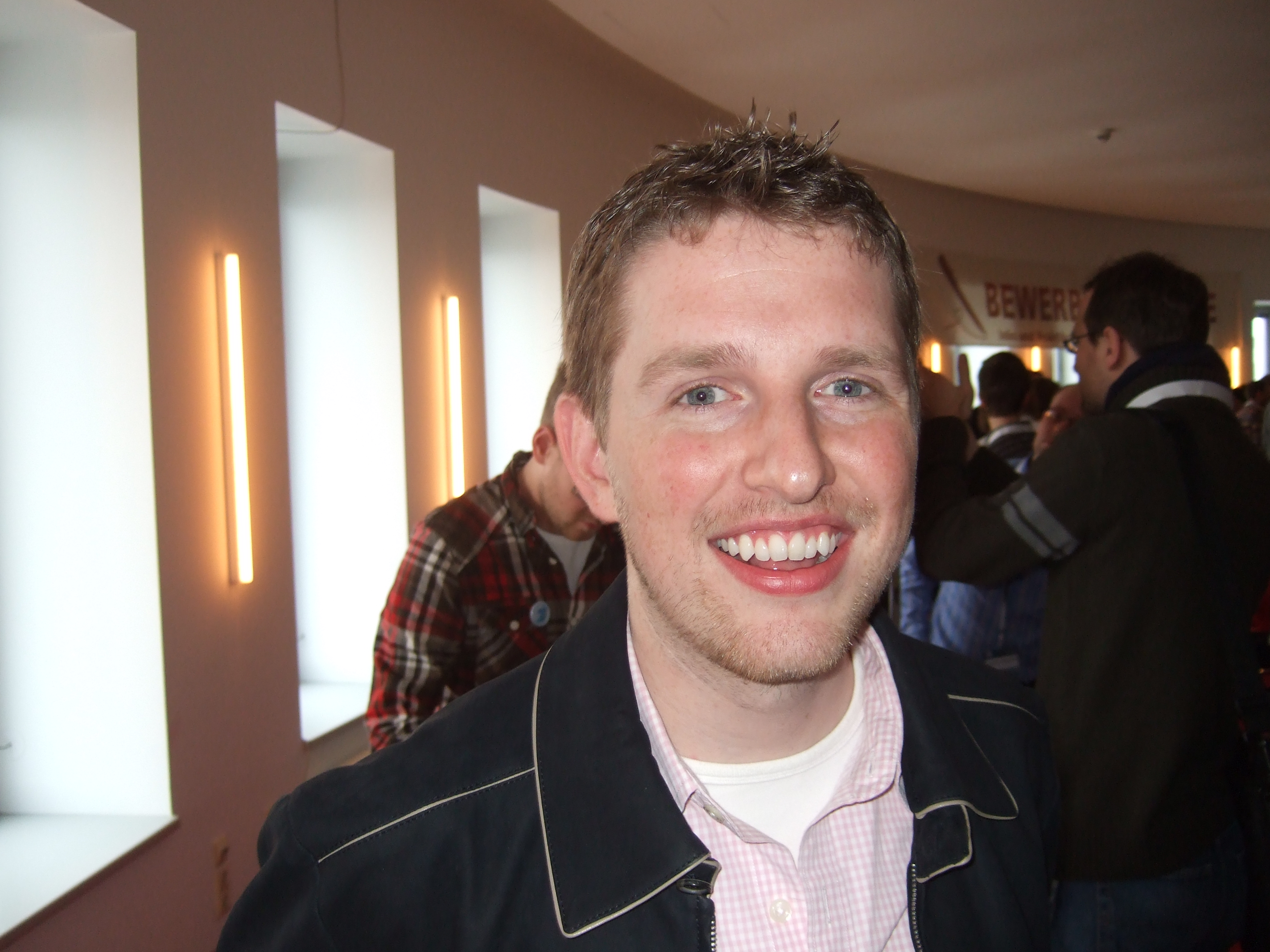
Mullenweg at WordCamp Germany 2009

Mullenweg began blogging in 2002 on the open source platform b2. B2 developer Michael Valdrighi abandoned the project and Mullenweg took it over in 2003. He and Mike Little created a b2 fork that year they called WordPress and published it under the GNU General Public License.

In March 2003, he co-founded the Global Multimedia Protocols Group (GMPG) with Eric A. Meyer and Tantek Çelik. In April 2004, he helped launch Ping-O-Matic, a mechanism for notifying search engines about blog updates.

In October 2004, he was hired by CNET who would allow him to develop WordPress part-time as part of his job. He dropped out of college and moved to San Francisco for the position.

=== Automattic ===
After leaving CNET in 2005, Mullenweg founded Automattic as a fully distributed company. Toni Schneider was hired as CEO so Mullenweg could learn how to manage a large organization. During this period, Mullenweg focused on product development while Schneider managed the company.

In January 2014, Mullenweg resumed the role of CEO, replacing Schneider. He led Automattic's expansion and a series of acquisitions, including WooCommerce in 2015, The Atavist Magazine in 2018, Tumblr in 2019, Pocket Casts in 2021, and Beeper in 2024. Mullenweg received the Heinz Award for Technology, the Economy and Employment in 2016, for "helping to democratize online publishing".

Automattic's valuation reached $7.5 billion in 2021. At the time, WordPress hosted 28 million websites, or 40 percent of all websites on the Internet.

Mullenweg at WordCamp Bulgaria 2011

On September 9, 2026, Automattic's board of directors put Mullenweg on a paid leave of absence. The board named Automattic's chief financial officer, Mark Davies, as interim CEO. Two days later, Mullenweg announced on a company-wide message board that he was once again "in control of Automattic". Automattic later confirmed his return as CEO.

Following Mullenweg's return, several members of Automattic's previous board departed. Toni Schneider and Sue Decker resigned from the board, while Mullenweg removed Ann Dunwoody. Mark Davies and Automattic's chief legal officer, Andy Missan, also left the company. On September 25, Automattic announced a new board consisting of author Hugh Howey, author Amy Chan, and IRL co-founders Henry Khachatryan and Krutal Desai.

== Public disputes ==
On several occasions, Mullenweg has publicly challenged competitors to WordPress and WordPress.com. He has stated that he prefers to settle disputes in the court of public opinion and described his approach as "brinksmanship", noting that the potential cost of legal action could put Automattic in a "tough spot".

In 2008, shortly before WordPress 2.5's release, Six Apart's Movable Type published "A WordPress 2.5 Upgrade Guide"—a comparison of their CMS with their rival, WordPress—as a company blog article that Mullenweg characterized as "desperate and dirty". In 2013, developers on the digital marketplace Envato were banned from speaking at WordPress events after he criticized the platform for selling WordPress themes with the graphics and CSS components under a proprietary license instead of the GPL.

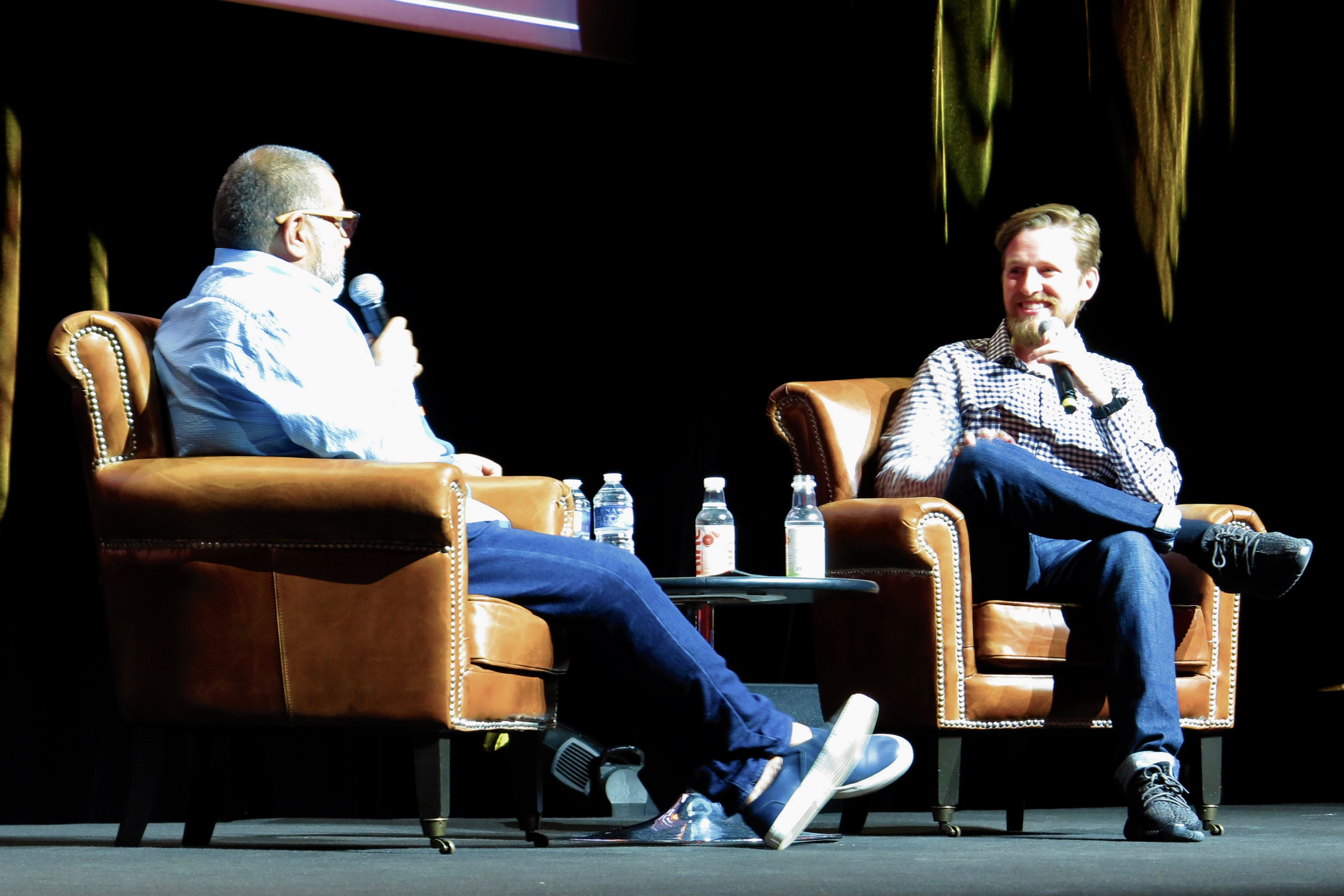
Mullenweg being interviewed at WordCamp 2017

In 2016, Mullenweg accused Wix.com, a competitor to WordPress.com, of reusing WordPress's mobile text editor code in Wix's own mobile app without adhering to the terms of the GPL. Despite the license's requirement to publish anything built with GPL code under the GPL, Wix's CEO claimed that the company open-sourced their forked version of the component and satisfied the license's terms before the app switched to its own fork of the MIT-licensed text editor that the WordPress editor was based upon. The new fork added a clause to the MIT license that forbids redistribution under any other license.

In 2022, Mullenweg criticized GoDaddy for not reinvesting in the WordPress project sufficiently.

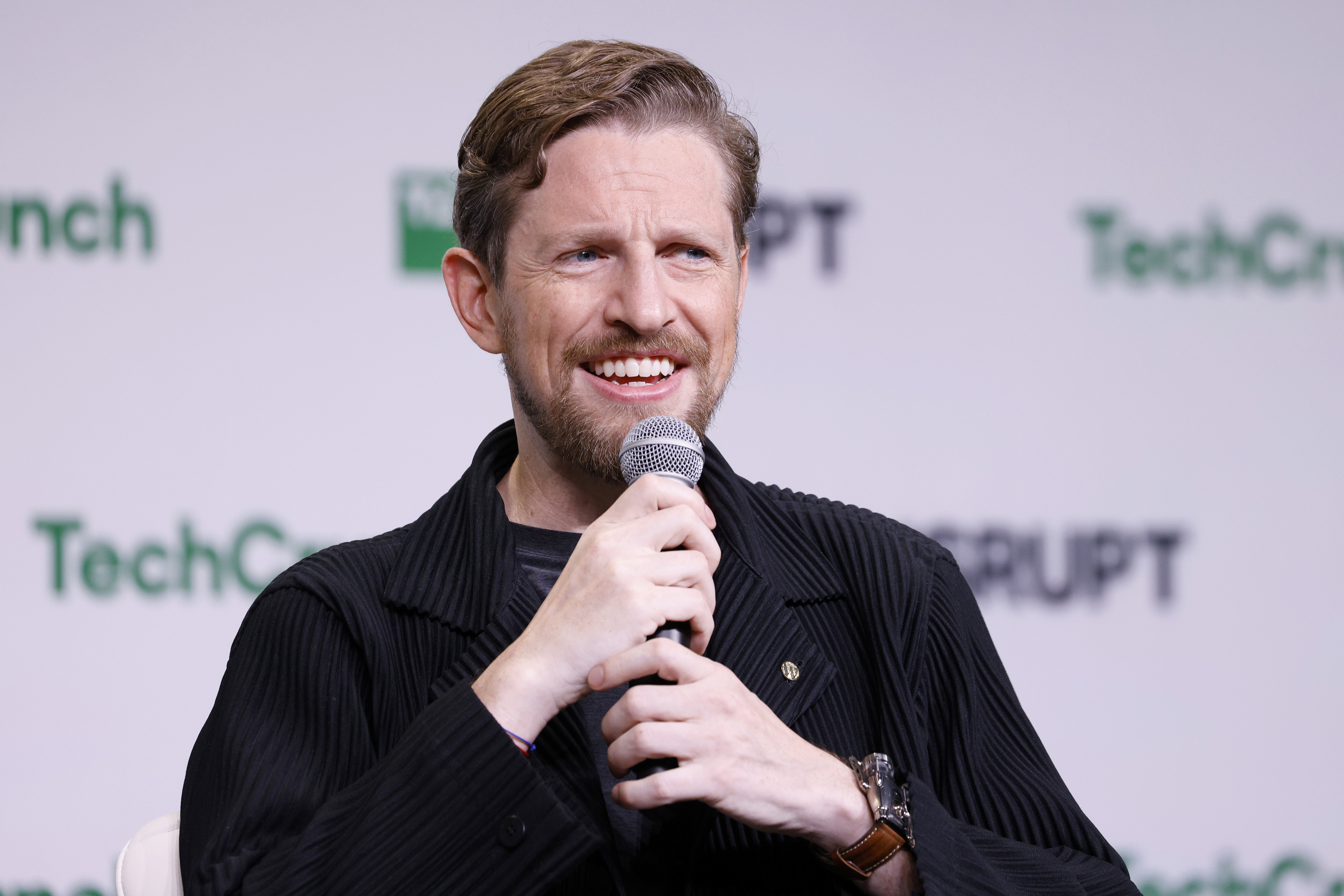
Mullenweg at the 2024 TechCrunch Disrupt

On January 9, 2025, the representative of the WordPress Sustainability team, Thijs Buijs, resigned via WordPress.org’s Slack channel, citing dissatisfaction with Matt Mullenweg’s December 24, 2024, Reddit post titled “What drama should I create in 2025?” highlighting concerns about what he described as “unsustainable leadership”. In response, Matt Mullenweg thanked Thijs Buijs for reminding him of the existence of a sustainability team, announced its disbanding, and subsequently closed Wordpress.org's #sustainability Slack channel.

=== Tumblr ===
Mullenweg began a three-month sabbatical from his role as CEO at the beginning of February 2024. During that time, Mullenweg engaged in a public feud with a transgender Tumblr user who, frustrated with the failure of Tumblr (owned by Automattic) to address transphobic harassment, posted that she wished Mullenweg would die in a comedic way. The user was subsequently banned. Responding to user uproar, Mullenweg addressed the ban in posts on his personal Tumblr blog, in which he characterized the post as a death threat, and shared private account information about the user. Mullenweg also responded to individual commenters on Tumblr in posts and direct messages, and went to Twitter to respond to the banned user's tweets about the situation. A few days later, transgender employees of Tumblr and Automattic made a post on the official Tumblr staff blog characterizing his response as "unwarranted and harmful" and stating that he did not speak on their behalf. They also said that the user's post was not a realistic threat of violence and not the reason for her ban.

=== WP Engine dispute ===
During the week preceding September 22, 2024, Matt Mullenweg—founder of WordPress.com—began speaking negatively about rival WP Engine. Mullenweg gave a speech at WordCamp US 2024 that argued that WP Engine had made meager contributions to WordPress compared to Automattic, criticized WP Engine's significant ties to private equity, and called for a boycott, sparking internet controversy. In response, WP Engine issued a cease and desist against what it characterized as defamation and extortion, attributing his attacks to WP Engine's refusal to pay Automattic "a significant percentage of its gross revenues – tens of millions of dollars in fact – on an ongoing basis" for what it claimed were necessary trademark licensing fees (later clarified as 8% of all revenue, payable in gross or in salaries for its own employees working under Automattic's direction, combined with a clause that would have prohibited forking) for the "WordPress" name. Automattic responded by sending its own cease and desist the next day, citing the trademark issue. On October 2, 2024, WP Engine sued Automattic and Mullenweg for extortion and abuse of power, which the defendants denied.

As a result of the dispute, WordPress.org blocked WP Engine and affiliates from accessing its servers—which include security updates, the plugin and theme repository, and more—on September 25, 2024. This was a day after its trademark policy was updated to advise against usage of "WP" "in a way that confuses people", listing WP Engine as an example. Following backlash, access to WordPress.org was temporarily restored until October 1 to allow WP Engine to build its own mirror sites two days later, which the company did. On the 12th, WordPress.org replaced the listing of WP Engine's Advanced Custom Fields (ACF) plugin on the WordPress.org plugin directory with their own version called "Secure Custom Fields" citing a guideline that empowers the foundation to "make changes to a plugin, without developer consent, in the interest of public safety". While Automattic claimed this was a fork, it used the same product slug and update mechanism, essentially forcing the millions of users of ACF (maintained by WP Engine) to automatically switch to SCF (maintained by Automattic) on their next update, with no warning this would happen. This has been compared to a supply chain attack , and was the basis in WPE's lawsuit for claims that included violations of the Computer Fraud and Abuse Act (CFAA).

On October 7, 2024, to align the company's stance, Mullenweg announced that 159 employees—8.4% of Automattic—had quit in exchange for a severance package of $30,000 or six months of salary, whichever is higher, with the condition that the resigned would not be able to return. The next week, another offer of nine months' salary was made in an attempt to placate those who could not quit for financial reasons, though with only four hours to respond and the added term of being excluded from the WordPress.org community.

On December 10, 2024, a preliminary injunction was issued by judge Araceli Martínez-Olguín of the District Court for the Northern District of California stating that Automattic and Matt Mullenweg must cease blocking, disabling, and interfering with WP Engine and its associates’ access to WordPress.org.

In February 2025, a class action lawsuit was filed by a WP Engine customer, accusing Automattic and Mullenweg of "deliberately abusing their power and control over the WordPress ecosystem to purposefully, deliberately, and repeatedly disrupt contracts", stating that the company's interference with WP Engine's operations caused disruptions in the maintenance and security of customer's own websites.

In September 2026, Judge Araceli Martinez-Olguin revived WP Engine's antitrust claims (monopolization, attempted monopolization, and tying) against Automattic and Mullenweg, departing from her 2025 dismissal of the same claims. She dismissed the digital-extortion and Computer Fraud and Abuse Act claims. The revised antitrust claims, if proven, can support triple damages. The case remains pending.

== Audrey Capital ==
Mullenweg is a principal at angel investment firm Audrey Capital, which he co-founded in 2008 alongside Naveen Selvadurai and Audrey Kim.

As of 2024, the company lists investments in companies such as CoinDesk, MakerBot, Sonos, SpaceX, Ring, as well as software companies including Calm, Chartbeat, DailyBurn, Memrise, Genius, Nord Security and Telegram. It has also funded startups that provide services to web developers including Creative Market, GitLab, NPM, SendGrid, Stripe and Typekit. From 2017 to 2019, Mullenweg also served as a board member for GitLab.

Mullenweg has employed a team of contributors to WordPress through Audrey Capital since 2010, who work separately from Automattic.

On the 20th anniversary of WordPress' initial release, Mullenweg announced a scholarship program aimed at the children of significant contributors to open-source projects.

== See also ==
- Browse Happy
