= WooCommerce =

Open source plugin for WordPress

- Original authors: Mike Jolley, James Koster
- Developer: Automattic
- Release: 2011
- Stable release: 11.3.0 / 11 November 2026
- Written in: PHP
- Operating system: Unix-like, Windows
- Type: e-commerce
- License: GPL
- Website: woocommerce.com
- Repository: github.com/woocommerce/woocommerce

WooCommerce is an open-source e-commerce plugin for WordPress. It is designed for online merchants of all sizes using WordPress. Launched on September 27, 2011, the plugin gained popularity for its simplicity to install and customize and for the market position of the base product as freeware (even though many of its optional extensions are paid and proprietary). WooCommerce is developed and supported by Woo and includes contributions from a global community of developers.

== History ==
WooCommerce was first developed by WordPress theme developer WooThemes, who hired Mike Jolley and James Koster, developers at Jigowatt, to work on a fork of Jigoshop that became WooCommerce. As of October 2024, WooCommerce is used by 9.2% of all websites, according to W3Techs.

In November 2014, the first WooConf, a conference focusing on eCommerce using WooCommerce, was held in San Francisco, California.

In May 2015, WooThemes and WooCommerce were acquired by Automattic, operator of WordPress.com and core contributor to the WordPress software.

In December 2020, WooCommerce acquired MailPoet, a popular WordPress newsletter management plugin. Subsequently, WooCommerce launched the WooCommerce Mobile App for iOS and Android. The app lets WooCommerce store owners view and manage their stores from mobile devices.

On October 31, 2023, WooCommerce changed its branding to Woo. Woo is how Automattic starts referring to the brand/company, while WooCommerce is the open-source e-commerce platform for WordPress — Woo's core product.

== Usage ==
WooCommerce is used by a number of high-traffic websites. For the 3rd week of September 2015, Trends indicated that WooCommerce ran on 30% of e-commerce sites and millions of active installs. According to W3Techs, WooCommerce is used by 9.2% of all websites in October 2024.

Since Automattic's acquisition, WooCommerce has kept gaining market share to become a major E-commerce platform.

== Extensions ==
WooCommerce has attracted significant popularity because the base product, in addition to many extensions and plugins, is free and open-source. WooCommerce has hundreds of extensions and over 1,000 plugins. In addition, there are thousands of paid add-ons available at fixed prices. Many Premium Themes now offer capability with WooCommerce as well as plugins that make a theme framework compatible.

In addition to payment gateways, WooCommerce extensions provide functionality such as subscription billing, membership management, shipping integrations, marketing tools, and inventory management.

== Architecture ==
WooCommerce is an application-layer extension for WordPress and operates independently of the underlying hosting infrastructure. It can be deployed on self-managed servers or on managed WordPress hosting platforms. On managed hosting services such as WordPress.com, the hosting provider is responsible for infrastructure management; including operating system maintenance, WordPress core updates, backups, and security, while WooCommerce provides the e-commerce functionality within the managed WordPress environment.

== Revenues ==
A study conducted in 2017 by Todd Wilkins, Head of WooCommerce, suggests that WooCommerce stores would collectively account for nearly $10 billion in sales.

== See also ==
- Comparison of shopping cart software
- List of online payment service providers
- WordPress
