= Reginald Brettauer Fisher =

British biochemist

Reginald Brettauer Fisher CBE FRSE (13 February 1907 – 11 November 1986) was a British biochemist, specialising in the study of proteins.

== Life ==
He was born on 13 February 1907, the son of Joseph Sudbury Fisher. He was educated in King Edward VII School, Sheffield. He then studied sciences at the University of Oxford. On graduation in 1933, he became a Demonstrator in Chemistry at the university. In 1939, he won a Rockefeller Travelling Scholarship.

In the Second World War, he worked as a Research Officer for the Ministry of Home Security and was later seconded to the Air Ministry. This appears to be connected to the British production of Sarin. In March 1945, he was raised to the rank of Honorary Wing Commander. He returned to the University of Oxford after the war.

In 1959, he accepted the post of Professor of Biochemistry at the University of Edinburgh. In 1960, he was elected a Fellow of the Royal Society of Edinburgh. His proposers were David Whitteridge, Lord Perry, Robert Brown and Reginald Passmore. He resigned from the Society in 1977

In 1966, he was belatedly appointed a Commander of the Order of the British Empire (CBE) for services to the Ministry of Defence during the war.

He died on 11 November 1986.

== Publications ==
- Uric Acid Synthesis in Pigeons (1935)
- Protein Metabolism (1954)

== Family ==
In 1929, he married Mary Saleeby (b.1905) daughter of C. W. Saleeby. Mary had was tutored by D. H. Lawrence.

== Artistic recognition ==
The National Portrait Gallery, London hold 6 photographs of Fisher.
