= Namogoo =

- Company type: Private
- Founded: 2014
- Founders: Chemi Katz and Ohad Greenshpan
- Headquarters: Boston, USA; Herzliya, Israel
- Area served: Worldwide
- Products: Customer Journey Hijacking Prevention, Customer Privacy Protection
- Website: www.namogoo.com

Namogoo Technologies Ltd. is a software as a service company that helps online businesses prevent Customer Journey Hijacking. Namogoo’s technology detects and blocks unauthorized ads injected into consumer browsers that redirect website visitors to competitor products and promotions.

== History ==
Namogoo was founded in August 2014 by entrepreneurs Chemi Katz and Ohad Greenshpan. In December 2014, the company launched its Customer Hijacking Prevention platform, which detects and blocks malicious content and unauthorized ads injected onto visitor sessions.

In May 2020, Namogoo completed its strategic acquisition of behavioral analytics platform Personali.

In January 2021, Namogoo launched Intent-Based Promotions, which autonomously optimizes promotion spend by synchronizing eCommerce brands’ business goals with real-time shopper intent, preventing customer journey abandonment and increasing revenue.

In July 2021, Namogoo announced its acquisition of Remarkety, an e-commerce–focused email and SMS marketing automation company.

Following consecutive layoffs in 2022 and 2023, Namogoo’s workforce declined from about 140 to 40 employees.

In November 2025, Namogoo was acquired by French firm AB Tasty in a share-based deal reportedly valued between $20 million and $40 million - far below its previous $177 million valuation. The sale resulted in significant losses for several investors, despite Namogoo having raised $84.5 million over the preceding decade.

== Technology ==
Namogoo's cloud-based service, built on proprietary machine learning technology, detects and blocks invasive content distributed across e-commerce sites. The system monitors and analyzes web sessions between servers and customer browsers, applying pattern analysis techniques to classify and restrict unauthorized web activity. Its core engine processes data points related to content inspection, statistical analysis, and behavioral patterns to inform automated decisions. By identifying and blocking activities associated with customer journey hijacking — which can redirect traffic and reduce conversion rates — the service aims to maintain the intended user experience on e-commerce platforms.
