= Day One (app) =

Smartphone and desktop app for journaling

- Developers: Bloom Built, LLC (Automattic)
- Release: March 2011
- Written in: Objective-C
- Operating system: Android, macOS, iOS
- Type: Digital journal
- License: Proprietary software
- Website: dayoneapp.com

Day One is a personal journaling app developed by Bloom Built and available on Android, macOS, iOS, and Windows. The app allows users to create and organize journal entries, incorporating multimedia content and metadata such as location, date, and weather.

First released in 2011, Day One received Mac App of the Year award in 2012 and an Apple Design Award in 2014. The app was acquired by Automattic in 2021.

== History ==
Day One was first released by Bloom Built in March 2011. From its origination, Day One focused on combining traditional journaling with digital features. Users are able to incorporate elements such as photos, videos, audio, and location data into journal entires. The application supports synchronization across Apple devices, allowing users to create and access entries across macOS and iOS platforms.

On February 4, 2016, Bloom Built introduced Day One 2 for Mac and iOS, describing it as a complete rebuild of the application. The update introduced a visual overhaul and new features such as multiple journals and support of photos.

In March 2025, Day One introduced a Windows version of the journaling app, available on the Microsoft Store.

The application has been reviewed by tech websites such as Macworld, The Verge, and Lifehacker.

== Features ==
Day One includes features like data syncing with multiple devices; end-to-end encryption, Markdown authoring of entries; location, weather, date, time, and other automatic metadata; quick entry menu bar (Mac only); and reminders.

On June 12, 2017, Bloom Built added end-to-end encryption to Day One 2 after two years of development. The update was a culmination of the Day One Sync services launched in 2015 as a replacement for iCloud and DropBox sync.

Day One previously offered a service called Publish for publishing selected entries to a Day One-hosted webpage and sharing via Facebook, Twitter, Tumblr, and other social services.
