= Pocket Casts =

Podcast streaming service

- Developer: Shifty Jelly
- Release: January 27, 2011; 15 years ago
- Stable release: 8.19 / September 1, 2026
- Operating system: Android, Android TV, iOS, macOS, tvOS, watchOS, Wear OS, Web, Windows, Windows Phone
- Type: Podcast aggregator
- License: Mozilla Public License 2.0 (Android and iOS)
- Website: pocketcasts.com
- Repository: github.com/Automattic/pocket-casts-android; github.com/Automattic/pocket-casts-ios

Pocket Casts is a podcast streaming service originally launched in 2011 for iOS and Android. The app allows for searching, downloading and subscribing to podcasts and syncs across devices. Pocket Casts was developed by Russell Ivanovic and Philip Simpson under the Australian independent development team Shifty Jelly. In 2018, the app was acquired by a group of public radio organisations including National Public Radio before being sold to WordPress.com owner Automattic in 2021.

With initial development efforts focusing on Android, Pocket Casts for iOS and Android was made free and open source in 2022 and received its latest major release 8.0 in 2025. It was also launched for the web, macOS, and Windows, and integrated to car head units, smart speakers, smartwatch and TV operating systems. Initially requiring a one-time fee, Pocket Casts switched to a freemium model in 2019, adding a subscription plan with more features. Commentators have directed praise to the array of features and the interface's simplicity. In 2020, a request by the Cyberspace Administration of China led to the removal of Pocket Casts from Apple's App Store in China.

== History ==
Pocket Casts was created by independent Australian mobile app developer Shifty Jelly, founded by Russell Ivanovic and Philip Simpson. Previously working as enterprise Java developers, Ivanovic and Simpson switched to mobile app development with the announcement of Apple's App Store, starting by creating a weather forecast app. With Nathan Swan and Simon Sams working as designers, Shifty Jelly launched Pocket Casts for iOS and Android in 2011, eventually releasing for other platforms.

In May 2018, it was announced that the app would be sold to a group of public radio entities comprising National Public Radio (NPR), WNYC Studios, WBEZ Chicago, and This American Life. Shifty Jelly's team stated that they accepted the offer due to their nonprofit operations and "collaborative" ethos. Ivanovic and Simpson remained in the app team, and former iHeartRadio executive vice president Owen Grover was named chief executive officer (CEO) of Pocket Casts. BBC Studios was declared an investor in March 2020.

A January 2021 article by Current newspaper reported that the companies owning Pocket Casts agreed to sell it after NPR stated it lost over US$800,000 throughout 2020 due to the app. WordPress.com's parent company Automattic acquired it in July 2021. The company soon announced embed integrations of Pocket Casts into WordPress sites. Ivanovic and Simpson were kept in leadership roles, and, at the time of acquisition, John Gibbons was the CEO of Pocket Casts. In October 2022, the Android and iOS apps were made open source, with the source code released under the Mozilla Public License 2.0.

=== Android and iOS version history ===
Pocket Casts received its first launch on January 27, 2011, for iOS, becoming available for Android in March. Before 2013, the Android version of Pocket Casts was ported from the iOS app. After six months of development, the Android app received a 4.0 version update in 2013 with additional features such as cross-device syncing and a redesign compliant with Google's guidelines. At the time, development focused on the Android version due to increased usage compared to the iOS version. In the following year, version 4.5 introduced Google Cast support for streaming to connected televisions and an Up Next playlist feature, followed by an update with Google's Material Design interface in 2015.

The iOS app was rewritten in the Swift programming language with the launch of version 6.0 in July 2016, introducing interface changes and features such as multitasking, automatic volume boosting and silence trimming. In October of the same year, Pocket Casts for Android received a 6.0 update, which also incorporated automatic audio settings. The Android and iOS apps were both updated for version 7.0 in November 2018. Changes included human and algorithmic podcast curation, a major redesign, and iOS Siri Shortcuts integration. In the following year, version 7.6 enabled player toolbar customization and a separate Up Next screen. Pocket Casts was updated to version 8.0 in November 2025, replacing the filter tool with a playlists feature.

=== In other platforms ===
Pocket Casts was launched for the Windows Phone in April 2014 and as a web application in October. It was one of the initial apps available upon release of Android Auto in 2015, and support for Apple's CarPlay was added in August 2016. Pocket Casts is compatible with Sonos speakers since a July 2017 beta release, and it was integrated into Amazon Alexa as a skill in February 2019. Standalone support for the Apple Watch was added in June 2020, (Note: Before this, users had the option to use Pocket Casts on the Apple Watch as a companion app (without offline support).) and for Wear OS watches in July 2023. There are macOS and Microsoft Windows desktop apps; both had a version 2 update rewritten in Electron in June 2024. Pocket Casts was released for Apple TV in July 2026 and for Android TV in October.

== Features ==
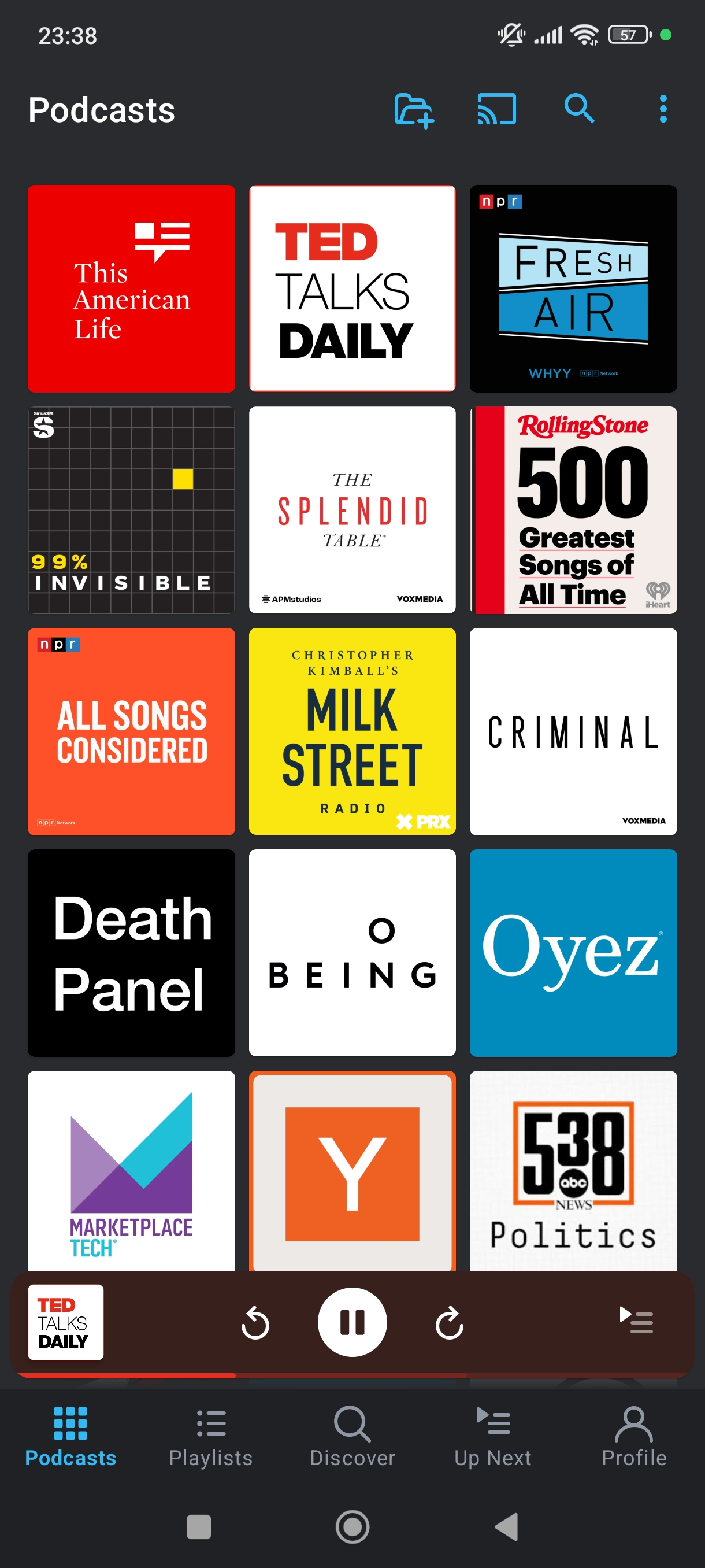
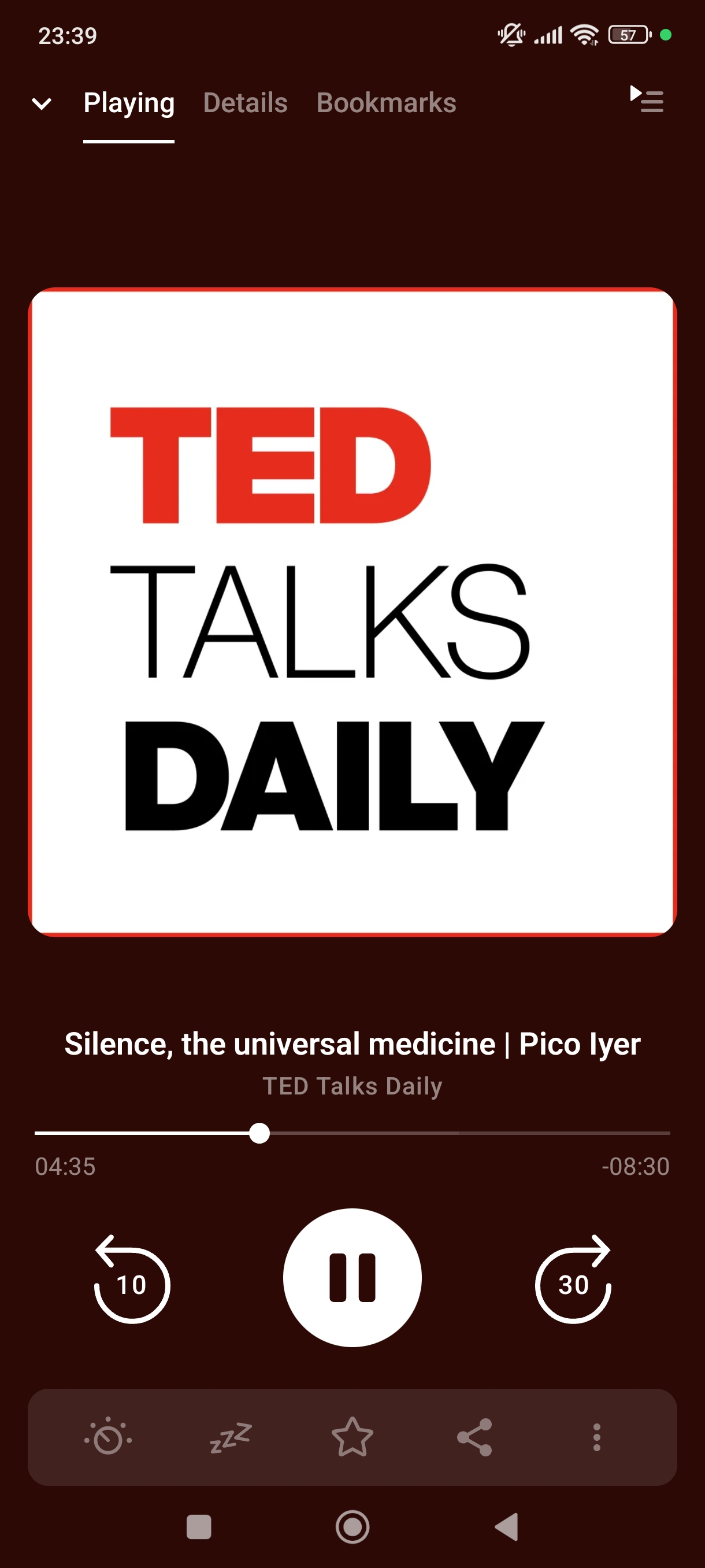
Screenshots of Pocket Casts for Android on the Podcasts tab (left) and on the episode player (right)

Pocket Casts features a navigation bar located at the bottom, which includes tabs that serve various functions. Users can browse podcasts online on the Discover tab through a search bar, a feed including popular and featured shows, or categories based on genre or region. The app allows access to around 300,000 shows as of 2018. Subscribing to a show makes it accessible from the main Podcasts tab. Episodes can be downloaded manually or automatically, and users can place them onto an Up Next queue, which can sync across devices. Playlists allow the user to group and sort episodes by release date, duration and other factors.

While a podcast is playing, the user is provided with settings such as playback speed, automatic voice volume boosting and silence trimming, skipping the audio some seconds forward or backward, and a sleep timer. The player toolbar also includes the ability to connect to an output device via Google Cast or Apple AirPlay. There are options to star or archive an episode. The app offers statistics about the user's listening time and episode history.

== Revenue model ==
Formerly, users were required to pay to download Pocket Casts; its price varied with the platform. Upon NPR's announcement of the Pocket Casts purchase, a spokesperson told Variety that the app's leadership team would reevaluate the business model. In November 2019, a freemium model was introduced to the app, making it free to download with an optional monthly subscription, Pocket Casts Plus, with more features. The premium plan allowed for cloud storage, additional themes, and (formerly exclusive) access to the macOS, Windows and web apps. (Note: In March 2025, the desktop and web applications were made available for non-subscribers.)

Pocket Casts CEO Grover said the change was made to conform with an "open-access philosophy of our public media ownership". The original announcement stated that users who had previously paid for the app would be offered three years of Pocket Casts Plus. Following consumer backlash, free lifetime access was given instead. The Apple Watch and Wear OS app launches were limited to Plus users. The app includes a Patron subscription level featuring additional cloud storage and early access to features.

== Reception ==
Upon the Android app 4.0 update in 2013, Andrew Martonik of Android Central wrote that Pocket Casts had a "clean and useful interface backed up by a strong feature set". Martonik highlighted the app's compatibility with varied screen sizes and cross-device syncing. Engineering & Technology's Bryan Betts and Kris Sangani remarked that it was faster than most RSS readers and that its "neat" audio speed settings generally managed to maintain the tone.

In a 2015 The Verge article, Chris Welch considered the main advantage of the Android app its design, which featured "fluid animations" and shifting color schemes. He praised its "seemingly endless array" of settings, despite its speed and volume functions not being executed "as well as some other apps." Jill Duffy from PCMag argued that the variety of settings, such as its skip options, were the highlight of the app. Duffy deemed the podcast discovery experience "slightly above average, but nothing to write home about."

Wired writer David Pierce stated that Pocket Casts became the best iOS podcast app with the 2016 6.0 update, which brought it "into full-fledged modernity." Podcast search was praised for its ease, and Pierce favorably contrasted the presence of certain specialized settings with the "simple" interface. Reviewing the iOS app's 6.5 version in 2017, Glenn Fleishman of Macworld deemed the app fresh and fast with decent podcast recommendations on the Discovery tab. Fleishman appreciated how the "straightforward" Up Next queue was integrated into the main screen focused design, but remarked on the lack of support for separate lists.

By its NPR 2018 purchase, Pocket Casts had over 500 thousand downloads on Google's Play Store and, as reported by podcasting analytics company Podtrac, accounted for about 2% of podcast downloads and streaming. That year, the app's design and "comprehensive" features were praised by Engadget's Billy Steele, who highlighted the ease of podcast searching and settings navigation. Carrie Marshall of MacLife complimented the filtering and syncing functions of Pocket Casts 7.0 and found the design simple and attractive, despite criticising the interface on the iPad. Vulture podcast journalist Nicholas Quah regarded the user experience as smooth, easy to use, and recommended for casual listeners, placing Pocket Casts as the best podcast app.

=== China App Store removal ===
In June 2020, Pocket Casts developers announced on Twitter that the app was removed from Apple's App Store in China following a request by the Cyberspace Administration of China (CAC). Two days before the removal, the developers were reportedly contacted by Apple on behalf of the CAC with a statement that it included content infringing China's speech laws. Pocket Casts wrote that they would not "be censoring podcast content at [the CAC's] request" due to their opposition to government podcasting restrictions. GreatFire, an organization advocating against censorship in China, considered it a part of a "worrying trend" and criticized Apple's role as a negotiator between the CAC and app developers.
