= Scott Berkun =

American author and speaker

- Education: Carnegie Mellon University
- Occupations: Author, speaker
- Employer: Microsoft (1994–2003)
- Known for: The Myths of Innovation, Confessions of a Public Speaker
- Awards: Jolt Award (2008)
- Website: www.scottberkun.com

Scott Berkun is an American author and speaker.

Berkun studied computer science, philosophy, and design at Carnegie Mellon University. He worked at Microsoft from 1994 to 2003 on Internet Explorer 1.0 to 5.0, Windows, MSN, and in roles including usability engineer, lead program manager, and UI design evangelist. He left Microsoft in 2003 with the goal of filling his bookshelf with books he has written.

He has written three best-selling books: Making things happen, The Myths of Innovation, and Confessions of a Public Speaker.

He taught creative thinking at the University of Washington, led an NYC architecture tour at the GEL conference, and his work has been featured in The New York Times, The Washington Post, and on National Public Radio. Berkun makes a living speaking at events and teaching seminars around the world on topics including leading teams, managing projects, and creative thinking.

In 2008 he received the Jolt Award for Productivity Winner for his book The Myths of Innovation.

== Bibliography ==
- The Art of Project Management, ISBN 0-596-00786-8
- Making things happen, ISBN 0-596-51771-8
- The Myths of Innovation, ISBN 1-4493-8962-7
- Confessions of a Public Speaker, ISBN 1-4493-0195-9
- Mindfire: Big Ideas for Curious Minds, ISBN 0-9838731-0-0
- The Year Without Pants: WordPress.com and the Future of Work, ISBN 978-1118660638
- The Ghost of My Father ISBN 978-0983873129
- How Design Makes the World ISBN 978-0983873181
