= Automattic =

American web development company

Automattic Inc.
- Type: Private
- Industry: Internet; Web development; Software
- Founded: 2005; 21 years ago, in the United States
- Founder: Matt Mullenweg
- Headquarters: San Francisco, California, US
- Key people: Matt Mullenweg (CEO, 2014–, president); Mark Davies (Interim CEO, 2026–2026)
- Products: Akismet; Atavist; Beeper; BuddyPress; Day One; Gravatar; Parse.ly; Pocket Casts; Simplenote; Tumblr; WooCommerce; WordPress.com
- Number of employees: 1,479 (2025)
- ASN: 2635
- Website: automattic.com

Automattic Inc. is an American global distributed company most notable for WordPress.com and its contributions to the WordPress system. The company was founded in 2005.

Automattic's other brands and products include Akismet, Gravatar, BuddyPress, Simplenote, WooCommerce, Atavist, Tumblr, Parse.ly, Day One, Pocket Casts, and Beeper.

== History ==
Matt Mullenweg co-founded the open-source blogging platform WordPress in 2003. Two years later, he founded Automattic to monetize the platform.

Initially the company developed commercial products related to WordPress, including WordPress.com for WordPress-managed hosting and the spam filtering service Akismet. Toni Schneider, a former executive at Yahoo, became chief executive officer (CEO) in 2006. Automattic acquired Gravatar in 2007, then IntenseDebate and PollDaddy in 2008.

Automattic transferred the WordPress source code and trademarks to the WordPress Foundation in 2010 and it also acquired the prompt generator Plinky. In 2011, the company created Jetpack, a WordPress extension.

Automattic acquired Lean Domain Search and CloudUp in 2013. In 2014, Automattic raised $160 million in a venture round, acquired Longreads, and Mullenweg became CEO. Schneider remained as an adviser while Mullenweg led product development. Automattic acquired WooCommerce and relaunched the hosted version of its content manager, WordPress.com, in 2015. This version replaced PHP with JavaScript and simplified administrative design. Automattic also launched a WordPress application with Mac support.

Automattic's remote working culture was the topic of a participative journalism project by Scott Berkun, resulting in the 2013 book The Year Without Pants: WordPress.com and the Future of Work.

On November 21, 2016, Automattic managed the launch and development of the .blog gTLD.

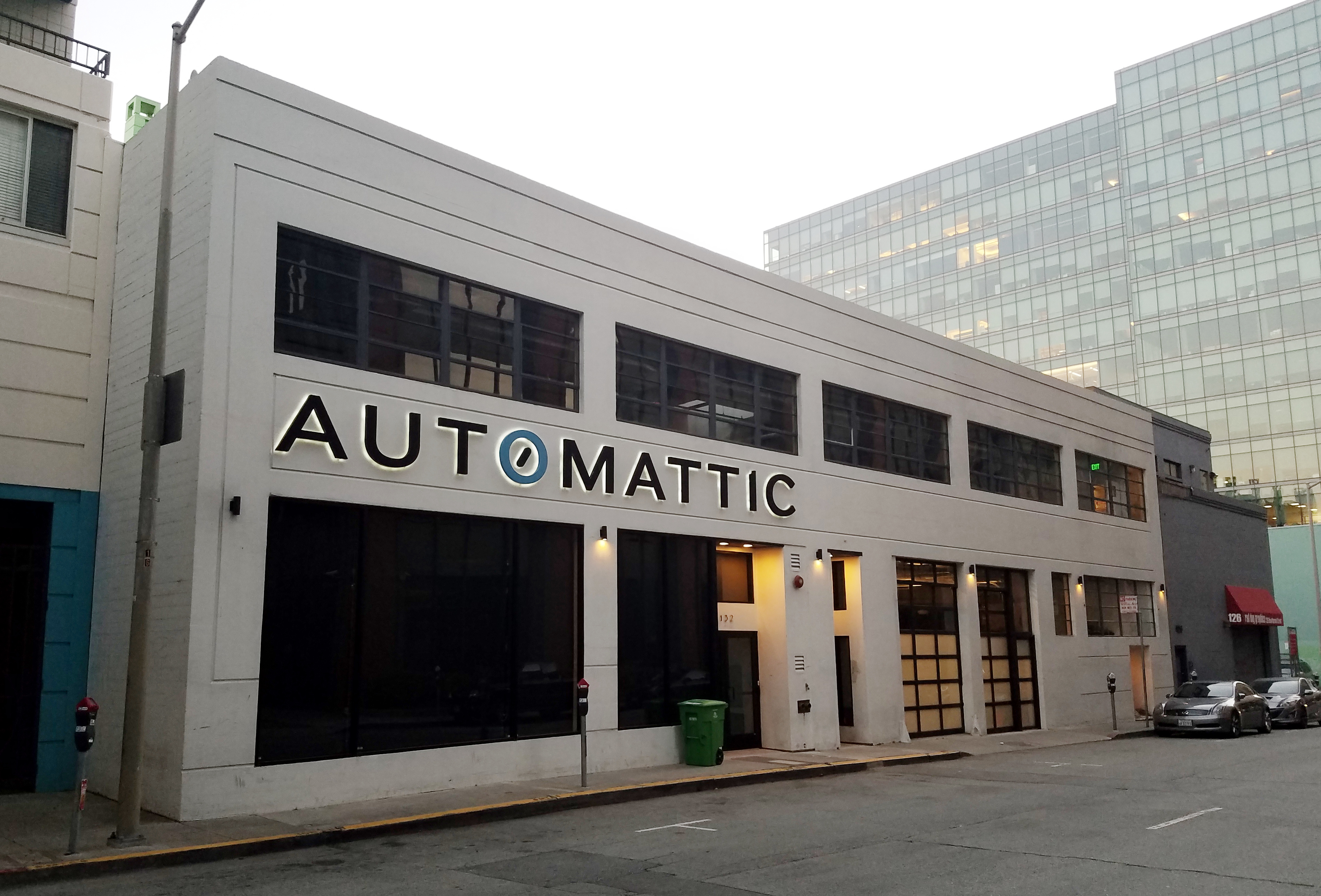
The former office of Automattic at 140 Hawthorne Street in San Francisco in July 2017 (since closed)

In 2017, Automattic announced that it would close its San Francisco office, which had served as an optional co-working space for its employees, alongside similar spaces near Portland, Maine and in Cape Town, South Africa.

Automattic acquired Atavist Magazine in 2018. The following year, it raised $300 million in a Series D funding round led by Salesforce Ventures in 2019, giving it a $3 billion valuation. The 2019 round of funding brought the total amount raised by Automattic to more than $600 million since its founding. Verizon sold Tumblr to Automattic in August 2019 for approximately $3 million. As part of the acquisition, Automattic retained approximately 200 Tumblr staffers. The same year, Google and Automattic partnered to create Newspack, a publishing platform for local news organizations. Google, the Lenfest Institute for Journalism, the Knight Foundation, and Civil Media invested $2.2 million in the project.

The COVID-19 pandemic boosted Automattic's growth as more businesses moved online. In August 2020, Automattic released P2, a collaboration platform with a blog-like interface, designed for asynchronous distributed teams. That year, Automattic had approximately 1,200 employees. By 2021, Automattic's valuation reached $7.5 billion. At the time, the WordPress open-source software was powering 28 million websites, or 40 percent of all websites on the Internet that used a content management system (CMS). Automattic acquired the journaling app Day One and Frontity, a React framework for WordPress website development, and podcast streaming service Pocket Casts in July 2021. The following year, it acquired Parse.ly in its largest deal to date. The company launched the Jetpack AI Assistant for WordPress in 2023.

Automattic acquired multiservice messaging apps Texts in 2023. The company purchased messaging app Beeper, grammar checking tool Harper, and WordPress artificial intelligence plugin maker WPAI in 2024. Automattic was included in the 2024 Forbes Cloud 100 list. In February 2024, it was reported that the company would begin selling user data from Tumblr and WordPress.com to Midjourney and OpenAI.

On April 2, 2025, the company announced a restructuring that resulted in the layoff of 16% of its workforce, or 281 positions.

WordPress.com is Automattic's managed WordPress hosting platform. It provides hosting, software updates, backups, and support. It also provides various hosting plans and supports a range of website types, including blogs, business websites, portfolios, membership sites, and online stores. As of 2025, WordPress.com provides developer features such as SSH, SFTP, WP-CLI, and GitHub integration.

On September 9, 2026, Automattic's board of directors put Mullenweg on a paid leave of absence. The board named Automattic's chief financial officer, Mark Davies, as interim CEO. Two days later, Mullenweg announced on a company-wide message board that he was once again "in control of Automattic." Automattic later confirmed his return as CEO.

=== WP Engine dispute and lawsuit ===
In September 2024, Automattic was involved in a controversy with WP Engine, in which Automattic claimed WP Engine used the WordPress trademark in a way that confused consumers. One of the main claims made is that WP Engine does not pay trademark royalties to the WordPress Foundation. Over 8 percent of Automattic's staff resigned after CEO Matt Mullenweg offered $30,000 or six months' salary as severance to those who disagreed with his stance. The following month, Mullenweg made a second offer, increasing the severance to nine months' salary.

== Corporate affairs ==
As of December 2024, Automattic's board consisted of the following directors:

- Matt Mullenweg (founder and CEO of Automattic)
- Phil Black (co-founder of True Ventures venture capital firm)
- Toni Schneider (former CEO of Automattic, 2006–2014)
- Ann E. Dunwoody (retired U.S. army general)
- Susan Decker (former President of Yahoo! Inc.)
