= WordPress.com =

Web building platform owned and hosted online by Automattic

- Homepage as of September 2024
- Website type: Blog hosting
- Area served: Worldwide
- Owner: Automattic
- Creator: Automattic
- Website: wordpress.com
- Commercial: Yes
- Registration: Required
- Launched: November 21, 2005; 20 years ago
- Current status: Active
- Written in: JavaScript (since 2015); PHP (since 2005)

WordPress.com is a web building platform operated by Automattic. Launched on November 21, 2005, it provides hosting infrastructure and operational services for websites built with the open-source WordPress content management system.

Unlike self-hosted WordPress installations, in which users deploy and administer the software on their own hosting environment, WordPress.com integrates the WordPress software with managed hosting, platform operations, software maintenance, and technical support.

Although WordPress.com is built on the same core WordPress software distributed through WordPress.org, the two projects serve different purposes. WordPress.org distributes the open-source WordPress software for self-hosted deployment, whereas WordPress.com provides WordPress as a managed hosting platform operated by Automattic. While Automattic is a major contributor to the WordPress project, neither WordPress.com nor Automattic controls the open-source WordPress project or the WordPress Foundation.

== History ==
WordPress.com entered private beta on August 8, 2005, and became publicly available on November 21, 2005. Initially introduced as a hosted blogging platform, it expanded over time into a general-purpose website publishing platform supporting a broad range of website types.

In September 2010, Microsoft announced that users of its Windows Live Spaces blogging service would be migrated to WordPress.com following the closure of the platform.

In April 2025, WordPress.com introduced an AI-powered website builder capable of generating website layouts, text, and images from natural language prompts.

== Architecture ==
WordPress.com is implemented as a managed hosting platform for the WordPress content management system. The platform abstracts infrastructure management from end users by integrating website hosting, platform operations, software maintenance, backups, security updates, and technical support into a single service. Users manage websites through the WordPress administrative interface while infrastructure provisioning, server administration, operating system maintenance, and platform-level operations are performed by Automattic.

The platform is built on a modified version of the open-source WordPress software and operates independently of self-hosted WordPress deployments. Websites hosted on WordPress.com use the same core publishing architecture as WordPress while running within Automattic's managed hosting environment.

== Hosting model ==
WordPress.com provides free and paid hosting plans. The service supports a different website types, including blogs, business websites, portfolios, membership sites, documentation websites, and online stores. As of 2025, paid plans support the installation of WordPress plugins and themes. Business and Commerce plans additionally provide developer-oriented functionality including SSH access, SFTP, WP-CLI, and GitHub integration. The platform also provides automatic software updates, backups, security management, and technical support as part of the managed hosting environment.

Unlike self-managed WordPress installations, users of WordPress.com do not administer the underlying hosting infrastructure, operating system, or web server software.

== E-commerce ==
WordPress.com integrates WooCommerce as its native e-commerce platform for online stores. WooCommerce operates as the application layer while the underlying hosting infrastructure is managed by WordPress.com. Commerce plans provide managed deployment of WooCommerce without requiring users to configure or maintain the hosting environment independently.

== Artificial intelligence ==
In April 2025, WordPress.com introduced an AI-powered website builder that generates website layouts, written content, and images from natural language prompts. The system enables users to create websites through conversational prompts and is integrated into the platform's website creation workflow.

== Business model ==
WordPress.com operates under a freemium model, offering both free and subscription-based hosting plans. Revenue is generated through paid hosting plans, domain registration, premium services, enterprise hosting, and related commercial offerings provided by Automattic.

== Relationship with Automattic ==
WordPress.com is Automattic's primary managed WordPress hosting platform and forms part of the company's broader web publishing ecosystem. Automattic also owns and develops WooCommerce, Jetpack, Tumblr, Day One, Pocket Casts, and other publishing and communication products.

== See also ==
- Automattic
- WordPress
- WooCommerce
- Managed hosting
- Software as a service
- Content management system
