= Timeline of Instagram =

This list is a timeline detailing the history of social media network Instagram.

== Timeline ==
| Year | Month and date | Event type | Details |
|---|---|---|---|
| 2009 | October 21 | Product | Kevin Systrom starts working on the project with the name Burbn. |
| 2010 | March 5 | Funding | Systrom closes a US$500,000 seed funding round with Baseline Ventures and Andreessen Horowitz while working on Burbn. |
| 2010 | May 19 | Team | Mike Krieger joins the Burbn project |
| 2010 | October 6 | Product | Instagram launches (from Systrom and Krieger) with the aim of facilitating communication through images. Over 25,000 users registered on launch day, and over 100,000 in a week since launch. |
| 2010 | December 12 | Growth | Instagram surpasses 1 million registrations. |
| 2011 | January | Product | Instagram adds hashtags to help users discover both photographs and each other. Instagram encourages users to make tags both specific and relevant, rather than tagging generic words like "photo", to make photographs stand out and to attract like-minded Instagram users. |
| 2011 | February 2 | Funding | Instagram has raised US$7 million in Series A funding from a variety of investors, including Benchmark Capital, Jack Dorsey, Chris Sacca (through Capital fund), and Adam D'Angelo. The deal values Instagram at around $25 million. |
| 2011 | June | Growth | Instagram hits 5 million monthly active users. |
| 2011 | September | Growth | Instagram hits 10 million monthly active users. |
| 2011 | September | Product | Version 2.0 of Instagram goes live in the App Store (iOS) and included new and live filters, instant tilt–shift, high resolution photographs, optional borders, one-click rotation, and an updated icon. |
| 2012 | April 3 | Product | Instagram is released for the Android operating system with support starting at version 2.2 "Froyo", and it is downloaded more than one million times in less than one day. |
| 2012 | April 5 | Funding | Instagram raises US$50 million from venture capitalists for a share of the company; the process values Instagram at US$500 million. |
| 2012 | April 9 | Acquisitions | Facebook acquires Instagram for approximately US$1 billion in cash and stock. |
| 2012 | April 30 | Growth | Instagram hits 50 million monthly active users. |
| 2012 | June | Competition | Vine (service), a short-form video sharing service, launches. It was acquired by Twitter in October that year. |
| 2012 | December 17 | Product | Instagram updates its Terms of Service, granting itself the right – starting on January 16, 2013 – to sell users' photos to third parties without notification or compensation. |
| 2013 | February | Growth | Instagram hits 100 million monthly active users. |
| 2013 | May | Product | Instagram introduces photo tagging and "Photos of You," a new tab on a user's profile listing every picture he or she is tagged in. |
| 2013 | June 13 | Product | Instagram launches video sharing. |
| 2013 | July | Product | Instagram makes it easier to share posts by adding links to embed photos and videos. |
| 2013 | September | Growth | Instagram hits 150 million monthly active users. |
| 2013 | October | Controversy | Instagram deletes the account of Canadian photographer Petra Collins after Collins posted a photo of herself in which pubic hair was visible beneath her bikini bottom. Collins claims the account deletion was unfounded because it did not break any of Instagram's terms and conditions. |
| 2013 | November | Controversy | Instagram acts in response to a 2013 investigation from the BBC regarding the role of Instagram in sales of illicit drugs. The BBC had discovered that users, mostly located in the US, were posting images of drugs they were selling and then completing transactions via instant messaging applications such as WhatsApp Messenger. Corresponding hashtags are blocked as part of the company's response. |
| 2013 | November | Product | Instagram introduces sponsored post advertising targeting US users. |
| 2013 | December | Team | Snapchat announces that it will poach Emily White, director of business operations of Instagram. Emily White will move to Snapchat in January. |
| 2013 | December 12 | Product | Instagram adds Direct, a feature that allows users to send photos to specific people directly from the app. Instagram's primary intention with the Direct feature is to compete against messaging services, including Snapchat. |
| 2014 | March | Growth | Instagram hits 200 million monthly active users. |
| 2014 | June | Product | Instagram launches new series of editing tools – allowing users to minutely customize image characteristics like brightness, contrast, highlights, and shadows. |
| 2014 | August | Team | The company's Global Head of Business and Brand Development – a new position for Instagram – is announced. Facebook's former Regional Director James Quarles was assigned the role. |
| 2014 | August 21 | Product | Instagram makes itself more advertising-friendly by introducing a suite of business tools aimed at brands which offer insights and analytics related to their use of the image-sharing network. |
| 2014 | December | Growth | Instagram hits 300 million monthly active users. |
| 2015 | January | Controversy | In a similar incident to Collins's, Instagram deletes Australian Photography and Fashion Agency Sticks and Stones Agency's Instagram account because of a photograph including pubic hair sticking out of bikini bottoms. |
| 2015 | June | Product | Instagram bolsters up its advertising capabilities, testing ad formats that prompt users to do things such as installing an app, signing up for an email newsletter, or link to a retailer's site to purchase a product. |
| 2015 | June | Product | Desktop website redesigned to look consistent with the mobile web site and app. |
| 2015 | September 9 | Product | Instagram allows 30-second ads for all advertisers – twice the 15-second limit given for users. |
| 2015 | September | International | Instagram ads go global. |
| 2015 | September | Growth | Instagram hits 400 million monthly active users. |
| 2015 | October | Product | Instagram launches Boomerang, an app where the user shoots a one-second burst of five photos that is turned into a silent video that plays forwards and then reverses in a loop. |
| 2015 | November 17 | Product | Instagram kills off support from feed-reading applications. |
| 2016 | February | Product | Instagram starts enabling users to easily switch between multiple accounts. |
| 2016 | February 11 | Product | View counter added to videos. Views were counted since November 19th, 2015, meaning videos posted prior to that date lack the view count data. |
| 2016 | March | Controversy | Tech blogger Jed Ismael claims he has discovered over one million porn films on Instagram. |
| 2016 | March 15 | Product | Instagram switches its feed from chronological to algorithmically-driven best posts first. |
| 2016 | May 11 | Product | Instagram introduces a new look as well as an updated icon and app design for Instagram. Inspired by the previous app icon, the new icon represents a simpler camera and the rainbow lives on in gradient form. |
| 2016 | May | Product | Instagram announces that it will launch new business tools – including analytics that allow users to see audience demographics, post impressions, and reach. |
| 2016 | June | Growth | Instagram announces that it has over 500 million monthly active users. |
| 2016 | June | Product | Instagram announces instant translation feature. |
| 2016 | June | Product | API restrictions such as shutdown of feeds and restricted access to "followers"/"following" lists, and naming restriction for third-party applications to prohibit the text strings "insta" and "gram". The earliest announcements of these date back to November 2015. |
| 2016 | July | Product | Instagram announces that it will start allowing users to filter out comment streams – giving users the choice about which comments are acceptable or not for themselves. It also starts allowing users the opportunity to entirely turn off comments. |
| 2016 | August 2 | Product | Instagram launches Instagram Stories. The product works like Snapchat Stories: users can post 24-hour ephemeral photo and video slideshows that disappear. Instagram CEO Kevin Systrom openly admits that the feature is copied from Snapchat, based on the success of Snapchat stories. The feature is viewed as part of Instagram's goal of attracting users away from Snapchat. |
| 2016 | August | Product | Instagram brings in Image Zoom, allowing users to zoom into images. |
| 2016 | September | Product | Instagram removes the Photo Maps feature from its mobile apps, claiming that the feature was not widely used on the platform. |
| 2016 | October 13 | Product | Instagram launches a desktop client for the first time on the Windows 10 platform, which can be downloaded via the Windows Store. |
| 2016 | November 21 | Product | Instagram launches live video, which allows users to broadcast live on Instagram, for up to one hour. Live videos on Instagram are not preserved, and are removed from the service once a user is done broadcasting. Instagram also launches disappearing photos and videos for the Instagram Direct feature on the same day, and images and videos sent using this method disappear after a certain amount of time. |
| 2016 | December 6 | Product | The ability to mark comments as liked (initially on mobile apps only) is added. |
| 2016 | December 15 | Growth | Instagram announces that it has over 600 million monthly active users. |
| 2017 | February 22 | Product | Instagram launches a feature allowing users to post multiple photos in one post, in a slideshow-like fashion. |
| 2017 | May 4 | Product | The ability to upload pictures from the mobile website is introduced, though not yet videos. |
| 2017 | June 13 | Product | The ability to archive posts on profiles is introduced. Allowing users to not permanently delete posts but with the archive feature remove or reintroduce posts later without losing likes and comments. |
| 2017 | August 15 | Product | Threaded comments are introduced. Previously, comments under posts were chronological, linear, and not structured, where responding to a user was only done through "@username" mentioning. |
| 2017 | September | Competition | TikTok, a short video sharing service and social media service, launches. |
| 2017 | December 12 | Product | The ability to follow hashtags, in addition to users, is introduced. |
| 2018 | April 25 | Product | Data portability export options are introduced, allowing users to download an archive of their account data, as mandated by the General Data Protection Regulations. |
| 2018 | May 22 | Product | Instagram introduces the new "mute" feature that allows users to hide posts from certain users on their feed without unfollowing the account. |
| 2018 | June 20 | Product | Instagram announces the launch of IGTV, a video platform intended to compete against YouTube. Users will now be able to upload videos of up to 10 minutes, while creators and accounts with larger audiences can upload videos of up to one hour. IGTV will have a dedicated button in the Instagram app, in addition to a standalone app released the same day. |
| 2018 | June 26 | Product | Instagram announces the ability to voice call and video chat through the direct messaging feature on the platform. |
| 2018 | June | Growth | Instagram announces that it has over 1 billion monthly active users. |
| 2018 | November 30 | Product | Instagram announces new "Close Friends" feature, allowing users to choose a smaller audience to share stories to. |
| 2019 | May 19 | Product | Instagram announces "Shops", allowing for a virtual storefront on the app where users can buy and sell things completely within the app. |
| 2019 | October | Product | Instagram removes the "Following" activity tab, where users could see what other users they were following liked, commented on and other such activities. |
| 2020 | May | Product | Instagram launches new "Guides" feature, which enables users to engage with wellness-focused creators to take part in mental health discussion. |
| 2021 | October | Product | Instagram drops the IGTV tab and revamps its video format. |
| 2021 | November | Product | Instagram adds the option to remove single photos from carousels. |
| 2021 | December | Growth | Instagram reaches over 2 billion monthly active users. |
| 2023 | January | Product | In addition to the Story Highlights feature, Instagram introduces a new feature called "Live Story Replay." This allows users to save their live stories and watch them again at a later time, as well as share them with others. |
| 2023 | February | Product | Meta announces paid verification on Instagram through a subscription service called Meta Verified. It originally launched in Australia and New Zealand to test the feature. |
| 2023 | March | Product | Meta Verified is now available in the United States, Australia and New Zealand. There is a waiting list for other countries. |
| 2023 | June | Product | Meta Verified is now available in India. |
| 2024 | January | Product | The Explore tab becomes more personalized. Instagram introduces AI tools to suggest content ideas. |
| 2024 | February | Product | Instagram adds interactive stickers. |
| 2024 | March | Product | Reels are extended to up to 3 minutes. |
| 2024 | May | Product | Live shopping is introduced through Instagram Live. |
| 2024 | June | Product | Instagram introduces notes in posts. |
| 2024 | July | Product | Instagram introduces a "Buy Now" button in reels and stories and enabled direct purchasing. |
| 2024 | September | Product | Instagram introduces comments on stories. |
| 2024 | November | Product | Instagram adds the option to select a nickname for your friends or yourself that will show up in the DM section. |
| 2024 | December | Product | Instagram removes the ability to follow hashtags. |
| 2025 | August | Product | Instagram introduces Map feature, where you can share location to others. |
| 2025 | October 6 | Product | Map feature is now available in India. |
| 2026 | June | Product | Instagram introduces Instagram Plus, a new subscription based service. |

== See also ==
- Timeline of Pinterest
- Timeline of Snapchat
- Timeline of Twitter
- Timeline of Facebook
- Timeline of social media
