= History of X =

History of X may refer to:

- History of X (letter)
- Timeline of X, a social network formerly known as Twitter
  - History of Twitter
    - History of Twitter under Elon Musk
    - History of X Corp.
- History of X (Australian band)
- History of X (magazine)
- History of the X Window System
- History of MDMA, a drug also known as "X", short for "ecstasy"
- History of /x/, the 4chan board

== See also ==
- X (disambiguation)
