= Emily White =

Emily White may refer to:

- Emily White (gardener) (1839–1936), New Zealand gardener and writer
- Emily White (businessperson) (living), American technology executive and president of Anthos Capital
- Emily White (field hockey), Belgian field hockey player
- Emily Jane White, American singer and songwriter
