= Timeline of Snapchat =

The following is a timeline of the history of the photo messaging software Snapchat.

== Basic timeline ==
Time period	Development summary	More details
April 2011 – December 2012	Conception and initial launch	Snapchat is conceived by Stanford graduate students. Initial versions are launched and an initial userbase is obtained.
December 2014 – August 2016	Aggressive fundraising, focus on video, more product iterations	Snapchat raises large funding rounds (Series D: $485 million, Series E: at least $200 million but possibly up to $500 million, and Series F: $1.8 billion). Since Snapchat raises money more continuously, it is hard to pinpoint a specific funding round, creating some confusion for reporting. With the additional funds, Snapchat aggressively improves the product, with changes such as Chat 2.0, the introduction of stickers, and new monetization strategies. Daily video views grow from 2 billion in May 2015 to 6 billion in November 2015 and 10 billion in April 2016. Note, however, that unlike Facebook, that counts a view only after at least three seconds on it (and YouTube, which follows a more restrictive definition), Snapchat counts a view as soon as the video start playing, making its numbers hard to compare with Facebook.
September 2016 – present	Rebranding and preparation for IPO	The company rebrands itself from "Snapchat Inc." to "Snap Inc." and unveils the Spectacles. It also prepares for an initial public offering (IPO) in 2017. The IPO occurs on Thursday, March 2, 2017.

== Full timeline ==
Year	Month and date	Event type	Details
2011	April	Creation	Snapchat co-founder Reggie Brown creates the idea for an ephemeral messaging platform.
2011	July	Creation	Snapchat first launches from Evan Spiegel's father's living room under the name Picaboo, as an iOS-only app.
2012	March/April	Funding	After Spiegel and Bobby Murphy force Reggie Brown out of the company, they re-incorporate as Snapchat, and begin to acknowledge the idea as theirs alone, giving no recognition to Reggie Brown. Subsequently, Barry Eggers, a managing director at the venture capital firm Lightspeed Ventures, learns from his teenage daughter that the three most popular apps among her friends are Angry Birds, Instagram, and Snapchat. Liew, Eggers' partner at the firm, pursues Snapchat and agrees to invest $485,000 in the company.
2012	May 12	Userbase	Snapchat is processing about 25 images a second.
2012	October 29	Userbase	Snapchat says that users are sharing about 20 million images a day, or about 231 per second. For comparison, when Instagram had 10 million users it processed 25 photos a second.
2012	October 29	Product	Snapchat launches an Android app.
2012	December 12	Funding	Snapchat is reported to be raising north of $10 million at a $70 million valuation. Funders appear to include Benchmark Capital, one of the funders of Instagram.
2012	December 14	Product	Snapchat releases video sharing and begins prototyping monetization features.
2012	December 21	Competition	Social networking company Facebook launches Poke, an iOS app for sending expiring text, photos, and videos. It is widely viewed as a direct competitor to Snapchat.
2013	February 8	Funding	Snapchat raises a $13.5 million Series A led by Benchmark Capital's Mitch Lasky, with a post-money valuation between $60 million and $70 million. This is the same as the funding round rumored on December 12, 2012.
2013	February 8	Userbase	Snapchat users are now sending over 60 million snaps a day, or about 700 snaps a second.
2013	February 21	Product	Snapchat launches video sharing on its Android app after ten days of quiet beta testing.
2013	February 27	Legal	Snapchat is sued by Reginald Brown, a Stanford graduate student who used to be friends with Spiegel and Murphy. Brown claims that he originally came up with the idea behind Snapchat as well as its ghost logo, back when the product was still called Picaboo, but that Spiegel and Murphy changed passwords to shut him out of the servers. Snapchat calls the lawsuit "devoid of merit."
2013	April 16	Userbase	At the Dive into Mobile conference, Snapchat co-founder Evan Spiegel says that users now share 150 million images per day, or about 1700 per second. On the same day, a post on the Snapchat blog notes that the company is facing spam problems.
2013	June 22	Funding	Snapchat raises an $80 million Series B ($60 million for the company and $20 million as a secondary offering) at a valuation of about $800 million. The round is led by Institutional Venture Partners, and earlier investors Benchmark Capital and Lightspeed Ventures also invest. Other investors included General Catalyst Partners and SV Angel.
2013	July 1	Legal	Documents related to Reginald Brown's lawsuit against Snapchat are released. The documents demonstrate Brown's important early role while the product was being developed, and are intended to bolster the case that Brown is eligible for a 1/3 stake in the company.
2013	August 7	Competition	Facebook starts allowing people to send Instagrams with its Messenger product, a move that is widely seen as a competitive response to Snapchat.
2013	September 9	Product	Snapchat releases Snapchat Micro, an app for the Galaxy Gear smartwatch.
2013	September 9	Userbase	Snapchat CEO Evan Spiegel reports that Snapchat users are now sharing 350 million photographs a day (about 4000 per second).
2013	October 3	Product	Snapchat updates its app to include the option to create Snapchat Stories, a type of sharing that allows users to build chains of shared content that can be viewed an unlimited number of times over a 24-hour period.
2013	November 13	Potential acquisition	The Wall Street Journal reports that Snapchat spurned a $3 billion acquisition offer from social networking company Facebook. Neither Snapchat nor Facebook offer comment.
2013	November 19	Userbase	Snapchat users are now sharing 400 million snaps a day (about 4500 per second), more than Facebook.
2013	December		Snapchat hires Emily White as COO.
2013	December 11	Funding	Snapchat raises $50 million in Series C funding from Coatue Management.
2013	December 20	Product	Snapchat rolls out a change that allows users to replay one snap a day, thereby sacrificing some of its ephemerality.
2013–2014	December 27 – January 9	Security	A security flaw in Snapchat's Find Friends feature leads to 4.6 million usernames and phone numbers being leaked. Snapchat promises to work on beefing up security quickly. On January 9, Snapchat rolls out an update that allows people to opt out of the Find Friends feature.
2014	January 21	Security	Snapchat introduces Snap-tchas (a wordplay on CAPTCHAs) to deter spam and improve security, but hackers find workarounds within hours.
2014	February 7	Security	Security researcher Jamie Sanchez discovers a vulnerability in Snapchat whereby hackers can freeze a person's phone by sending the phone a lot of snaps.
2014	February 10, 11	Security	Snapchat is hacked to send people spam pictures of fruit smoothies.
2014	March	Acquisition	Snap secretly acquires Vergence Labs for $15 million.
2014	May	Acquisition	The company acquires the software company AddLive.
2014	May	Legal	The company reaches an agreement with the Federal Trade Commission (FTC). The government agency alleged that the company had exaggerated to the public the degree to which mobile app images and photos could actually be made to disappear. Under the terms of the agreement, Snapchat was not fined, but the app service agreed to have its claims and policies monitored by an independent party for a period of 20 years. The FTC concluded that Snapchat was prohibited from "misrepresenting the extent to which it maintains the privacy, security, or confidentiality of users' information."
2014	May 1	Product	Snapchat adds ephemeral text chat and video calling.
2014	May 9	Competition	Facebook removes Poke From the iOS App Store after 2 years, ending its direct competition with Snapchat.
2014	May 28	People	Embarrassing emails sent by Snapchat co-founder Evan Spiegel from many years before he started Snapchat are leaked.
2014	June 17	Product	Snapchat launches collaborative timelines based on events.
2014	August 29	Product	Snapchat updates its app, adding a "Live" section that allows people to follow events live.
2014	September 4	Product	Snapchat begins using push notifications for Snapchat Stories.
2014	September 29	Legal	After three years of legal wrangling, Snapchat finally settles its lawsuit with ousted co-founder Reginald Brown for an undisclosed compensation.
2014	October 10	Security	Hundreds of thousands of Snapchat photos are leaked. Snapchat does not appear to be at fault: the leak seems to be from SnapSaved, a service that allows people to receive snaps and archives all the snaps it receives, and Snapchat explicitly states in its terms of use that users should not connect Snapchat with third-party applications.
2014	October 17	Product, monetization	Snapchat announces on its blog that users will start receiving ads from brands under the Recent Updates section of its blog.
2014	November 17	Product	Snapchat announces Snapcash, a tool allowing people to send each other money easily through the app.
2014	November 23	Product, monetization	Snapchat includes a sponsored story from Samsung and the AMAs in its Our Story section. Although Snapchat has previously included topical stories related to the World Cup and Super Bowl in the Our Stories section, this is the first placement paid for by a brand.
2014	December 16	Product, acquisitions by Snapchat	Leaked emails from Sony Pictures show that Snapchat is planning a music feature, acquired QR scan company scan.me for $50 million, and acquired Vergence Eyeglass Cam for $15 million.
2014	December 22	Product, accessibility	Microsoft removes third-party Snapchat apps from the Windows Phone store at Snapchat's request. Since Snapchat has no official app, this means Windows Phone users can no longer use Snapchat.
2014	December 31	Funding	Snapchat announces that it has raised $485 million from 23 investors for its Series D round at a valuation of at least $10 billion.
2015	January 27	Product	Snapchat launches Discover, a daily feed comprising content from brands like ESPN, CNN, Vice, and Warner Music, National Geographic, Yahoo News, and others.
2015	February 10	Product, safety	Snapchat launches the Snapchat Safety Center, a section of its website with practical tips of how to stay safe while using Snapchat. The Safety Center launch is in collaboration with three nonprofits focused on Internet safety: ConnectSafely, iKeepSafe, and UK Safer Internet Center.
2015	March	Funding	Rumors of Snapchat's next $500 million funding round (Series E), at a valuation of about $15 billion, are circulated. Potential investors include Alibaba ($200 million) and Prince Al Waleed bin Talal Al Saud of Saudi Arabia.
2015	March		Emily White, who was COO since December 2013, leaves the company.
2015	May 26	Userbase	Snapchat has 100 million currently active users, who send snaps at a rate over 400 million a day. It is also seeing 2 billion video views a day.
2015	July 1	Product	Snapchat changes its interface to no longer require people to tap and hold to watch. They just need to tap to the relevant video. This move is interpreted as being an adaptation to the increasing length of video content being shared, that makes holding down more and more cumbersome. A number of other accompanying changes are made, including allowing people to have a profile GIF: they can take five photos of themselves and an animated GIF will be created by juxtaposing the five images.
2015	August 12	Product	Snapchat launches a new mode called Travel Mode in its iOS and Android apps, intended for people who are traveling and do not want to use too much mobile data. In this mode, Snaps, Stories, and Discovery content are not automatically loaded when the user opens the app, but are only loaded when the user taps on the piece of content.
2015	August 18	Advertising	An advocacy group, Secure Now, is running an ad on Snapchat opposing the recent nuclear deal with Iran. The ad targets Senator Ben Cardin who agrees with the current deal and urges users to, “Tell Senator Cardin: No to the bad Iran deal!”. The ad uses a filter in which friends can share it with each other.
2015	September 16	Product	Snapchat introduces 'Lenses', augmented reality filters that are available for use in video and photo capture. Lenses are initially limited to 7 filters, created internally by the Snapchat team.
2015	October 12	Product	Snapchat gets rid of its 15-person team running the "Snapchat Channel" (its original content) and shuts the product down.
2015	October 28	Product	Snapchat adds slow-mo, fast-forward and rewind video filters. It also adds 3D touch capabilities for iPhone 6S and iPhone 6S+ users.
2015	November 9	Userbase	Snapchat confirms to Financial Times that it is seeing 6 billion daily video views, up from 2 billion in May.
2015	November 10	Financial	Financial Times reports, using Morningstar data, that Fidelity Investments has marked down Snapchat's valuation by 25%, from $30.72 a share to $22.91 a share. Fidelity had previously acquired a stake in Snapchat in May, and this is the first devaluation. Fidelity declines to comment on whether the markdown was motivated by the company's performance, or market conditions, or both. Fortune reports that Fidelity has been marking down many of the companies in its Blue Chip Growth Fund, and Snapchat's situation is not unique.
2016	March 24	Acquisitions by Snapchat	Snapchat acquires Bitstrips, the company that makes bitmojis (personalized emojis). The news is broken by Fortune on March 24.
2016	March 29	Product	Snapchat announces Chat 2.0, a collection of product updates. The updates include Snapchat Stories auto-advance (moving to the next story after one story has played), over 200 stickers that can be used in chat messages, video notes, audio notes, video and audio calls, multiple photo-sending, and on-the-fly toggling between video and audio calls. Commentators find a connection between the announcements, arguing that the acquisition of Bitstrips might lead to the ability to create and send personalized stickers in the future.
2016	April 28	Userbase	Snapchat reaches 10 billion daily video views, up from 6 billion in November 2015 and 2 billion in May 2015. Reporting on the matter, Sarah Frier clarifies in Bloomberg News that this is not directly comparable to the 8 billion reported by Facebook, since Facebook counts a video as viewed only if the user spends at least 3 seconds watching the video, whereas Snapchat counts a view as soon as the watching begins.
2016	May 23	Product	Snapchat adds support for decorating snaps with 200+ stickers.
2016	May 26	Funding	Snapchat files with the U.S. Securities and Exchange Commission reporting its latest Series F round. The round includes $1.8 billion in funds raised. The funds were raised over a long period of time. TechCrunch reports that $1.158 billion of the $1.8 billion were raised since January 2016 ($650 million previously collected in 2015 makes up the rest of the $1.8 billion), and also reports a leaked pitch deck with revenue and userbase numbers and projections. The $1.8 billion total includes a $175 million raised from Fidelity that was announced in March 2016.
2016	June 3	Acquisitions by Snapchat	Snapchat acquires Obvious Engineering, a startup working on three-dimensional face scanning app called Seene (also called the "3D selfie startup").
2016	July 6	Product	Snapchat announces Memories, a feature that helps people find older content they have posted. By default, any snaps saved to the Camera Roll also get included in Memories, though the setting can be changed. It is also possible to search through old snaps in Memories. Memories itself cannot be accessed by others, but snaps collected from memories can be used as part of Snapchat Stories, that others can see temporarily. This also makes it easy for people to recover their snaps if their device is lost or damaged. Particularly sensitive content can be saved under My Eyes Only with passcode protection, but the content cannot be retrieved if the passcode is lost.
2016	August 2	Competition	Instagram launches Instagram Stories. The product works like Snapchat Stories: users can post 24-hour ephemeral photo and video slideshows that disappear. Instagram CEO Kevin Systrom openly admits that the feature is copied from Snapchat, based on the success of Snapchat stories. The feature is viewed as part of Instagram's goal of attracting users away from Snapchat.
2016	August 15	Acquisitions by Snapchat	Snapchat acquires mobile search app Vurb for $110M.
2016	September 8	Advertising	Snapchat is featured in a T-Mobile commercial.
2016	September 23		The company rebrands itself to Snap Inc. and unveils a pair of smartglasses called the Spectacles.
2016	October 28	Competition	Facebook begins testing in Ireland an ephemeral photo messaging feature available through the Facebook Direct inbox. This feature is seen as a clone of Snapchat.
2016	November	Legal	The company files documents for an initial public offering (IPO) with an estimated market value of $25–35 billion.
2016	December	Acquisition	The company opens research and development in Shenzhen and acquires advertising and technology company Flite and Israel-based augmented reality startup Cimagine Media for $30–40 million.
2016	December	Acquisition	A partnership is issued with Turner Broadcasting System that will allow integration of Turner properties on Snapchat, while cooperating with Snap Inc. to develop original content.
2017	January	Legal	The company announces that it will make the UK their international headquarters.
2017	Early February	Funding	The company officially confirms their plans for an IPO in 2017 and its expectation to raise $3 billion.
2017	March 2	Funding	Snap Inc. goes public with an initial public offering on the New York Stock Exchange on Thursday, March 2, selling 200 million priced at $17 per share, for a total of $3.4 billion of which $2.5 billion would go to the company and the remaining $900 million to early investors and executives (the announcement is made on Wednesday, March 1). The share price rises to a little over $24 by the end of the day, corresponding to a market cap of $33 billion. The price rises by another 10% on Friday, March 3, but as of March 3, Snap Inc. still has no buy ratings from analysts.
2017	June 21	Product	Snapchat launches location sharing with a new feature called Snap Map. Snap Map lets you share your current location, which appears to friends on a map and updates when you open Snapchat.
2019	May 23	Legal	The parents of Hunter Morby and Landen Brown file a lawsuit against Snapchat, alleging the “speed filter” encouraged excessive speeding that led to the deaths of their children. The lawsuit alleges that on May 28, 2017, the boys used Snapchat’s “speed filter” to capture their car’s speed as it reached 123 mph before crashing into a tree, causing a fatal fire. The lawsuit alleges Snapchat knowingly incentivized dangerous behavior among young users.
2019	May 25	Legal	Wentworth and Karen Maynard file a lawsuit against Snapchat and Christal McGee after McGee crashed into their vehicle at over 100mph, resulting in Maynard’s permanent brain damage. The lawsuit claims Snapchat’s “speed filter” encouraged excessive speeding. Despite knowledge of the risks, Snapchat didn’t disable the feature until June 2021. Snapchat’s CEO was ordered to be deposed in the case, as the plaintiffs argue the company’s negligence played a role in the crash.
2022	February 23	How To	Snapchat launches the ability for users to change their usernames. Usernames are only able to be changed once a year and any previous usernames can no longer be used by them or any other user.
2022	September 30	How To	You have two names on Snapchat: your username and your screen name. Your username only appears on your profile and is used to help friends and family find your account. However, your display name will appear above your Snap and Stories, on the Snap Map, and everyone’s feed.
2023	January 31	Competition	Snapchat+ Passes 2 Million Subscribers
2023	February 10	Legal	Snapchat shuts down the ability to run sponsored Filters
2023	February 16	Legal	Snapchat reaches 750 million monthly active users
2023	February 27	Competition	Snap launches ‘My AI’ (a new AI chatbot that adds OpenAI’s ChatGPT inside Snapchat)
2023	March 31	Legal	Snapchat shuts down the ability to run On-Demand Geofilters

== See also ==
- Timeline of Instagram
- Timeline of Twitter
- Timeline of Facebook
- Timeline of Pinterest
- Timeline of social media
