= Social media coverage of the Olympics =

Olympic Logo

Over the years, television broadcast rights have distinguished what Olympic-related content can be accessed by fans online. By doing so, mobile-friendly social platforms began to integrate into the Olympics. Athletes and fans use these platforms to share live updates, special moments, and behind-the-scenes specials.

Various social media platforms have been used for Olympic content, including Twitter and Facebook. Some marketers credit social media for prompting the official U.S. broadcasters, NBC, to live stream events, including early rounds.

== Background ==
The Olympics is able to advertise to its viewers and its host country with the use of data it collects through Social media marketing. Prominent social media platforms include: Twitter, Facebook, Instagram, Tumblr, YouTube, Google, MSN, Yahoo and many more. Campaign Initiatives and Artificial Intelligence technologies have been used to analyze the social media content of users. Information from consumers such as their preferences, demographics, age and locality are all analyzed to gain consumer insight. Campaign initiatives and AI technologies were used for such purposes in the 2010 Vancouver Winter Olympics and are in use currently. Social media marketing of the Olympics is a new phenomena, beginning prior to the 2008 Beijing Olympics

== Variations ==
There are two classifications of social media marketing recognized by the IOC:

- Officially sanctioned content from rights holders and sponsors that maximizes the use of Olympic content (imagery, hashtag)
- Unofficial content that is generated by brands that leverage the excitement of the Olympics

== 2008 Beijing Summer Olympics ==
Social media marketing emerged as a phenomenon during the 2008 Beijing Olympics, which progressed as a marketing and an advertising tactic ever since. The Beijing Olympics became the test subject for social media marketing initiatives started by advertising agencies. In 2008, social media marketing began the transition from one-sided communication to mass communication of the Olympic Games. Although social media marketing of the Olympic Games began in 2008, the audience to the Olympics was still primarily reached through television–reaching an audience of 4.3 billion viewers. At the time, the viewers of the Olympic Games through Internet website platforms made up an audience of approximately 390 million individuals.

What was the beginning of Olympic social media marketing, was also the beginning of a more globalized experience of the Olympic Games via social media. Twitter, now a prominent social media platform, began in 2006 and grew to three million active users by the beginning of the 2008 Beijing Olympics. Members of Facebook, another prominent social media platform, tracking the Olympic Games grew from approximately one million during the Olympic Games of Athens 2004 to 90 million during the 2008 Beijing Olympics. Social media use, in general, increased by 24 percent between 2007 and 2008–from 63 percent of U.S. adults to 87 percent of U.S. adults.

== 2010 Vancouver Winter Olympics ==
The International Olympic Committee (IOC) deemed The Vancouver Winter Olympics as "the first social media games” based on its fan base through social media platforms. The IOC launched their Facebook page a month before the games began, attracting 1.5 million fans. Shifting to online viewing attracted a younger audience than past Olympic games with over 60 percent of Facebook fans being under 24 years of age.

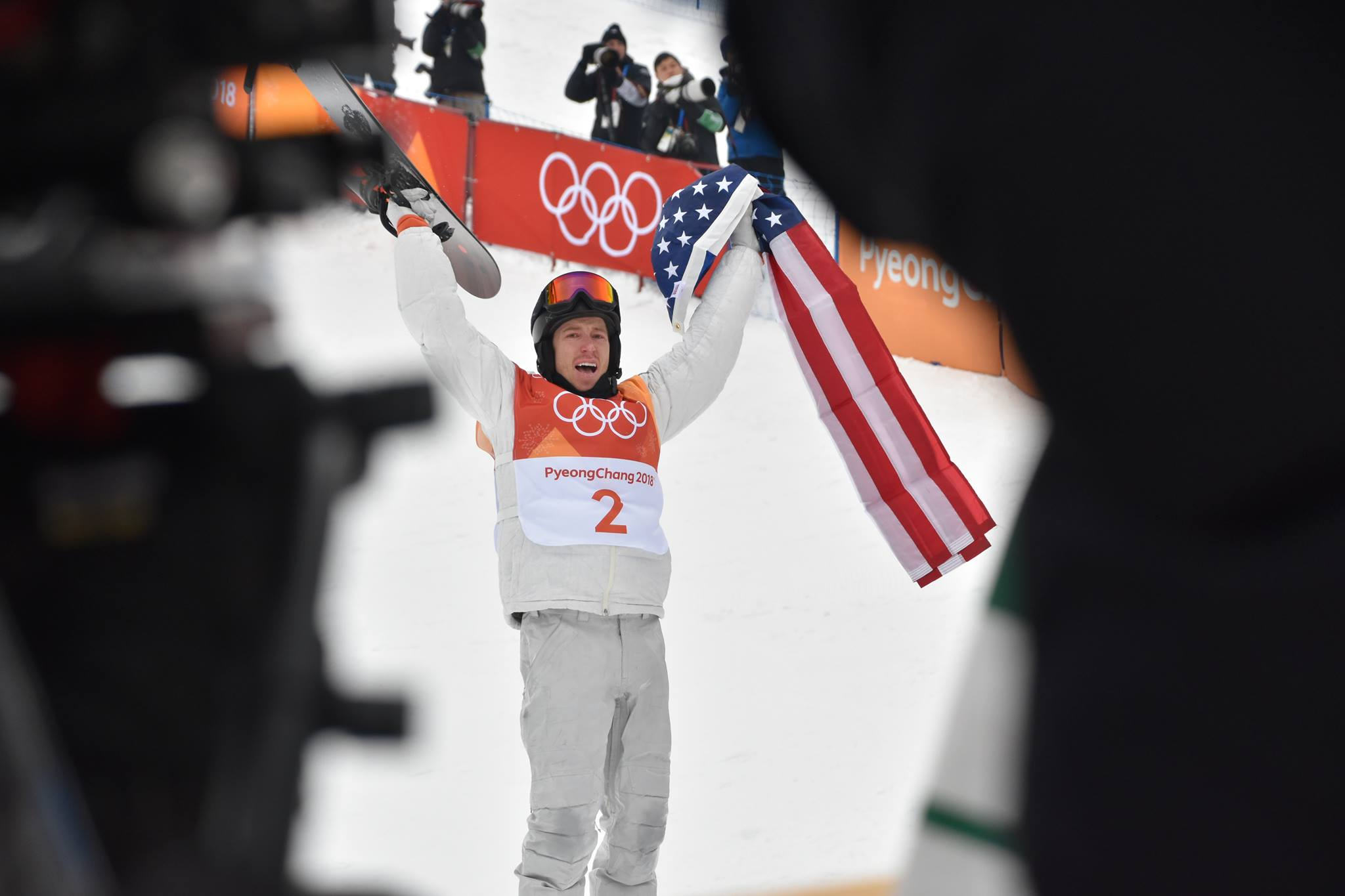
Shaun White

Athletes like Lindsey Vonn and Shaun White reached fans on social media as the platform posted behind-the-scenes coverage on their experiences. The IOC used social media to create competitions between athletes and fans streamed online. Its YouTube channel hosted a “Best of Us” challenge in which the public could compete in games with their favorite athletes, acquiring three million viewers. Photos spread across social media platforms, such as Flickr, which had 11,000 photos posted by 600 photographers, bringing a new perspective to the games.

Twitter contributed constant live updates of the competitions. The IOC's Twitter following doubled to 12,000 followers during the Vancouver Olympics, creating a larger viewer population for the games. The IOC created social media guidelines as more athletes and fans got online to interact with the Olympics. Social media was still relatively new as a marketing platform, so these guidelines confused many individuals.

== 2012 London Summer Olympics ==
The London 2012 Olympic Games succeeded in broadcasting, participation and marketing. For the first time, the IOC broadcast the Olympic Games live and on-demand through YouTube, allowing fans to access the Games anytime, anywhere through live streaming. The combination of conventional broadcasting and mobile platforms reached a global audience of 4.8 billion people.

Social media soared with Facebook, Twitter and Google+, attracting 4.7 million followers. Athletes shared photographs, interacted online with fans and updated daily, either in person or via an agent. Instagram was established by 2012, making itself a premier photo-sharing platform perfect for athletes to capture their emotions. Lewis Wiltshire, head of sport for Twitter UK said, "Never before have fans had such direct access to their sporting heroes."

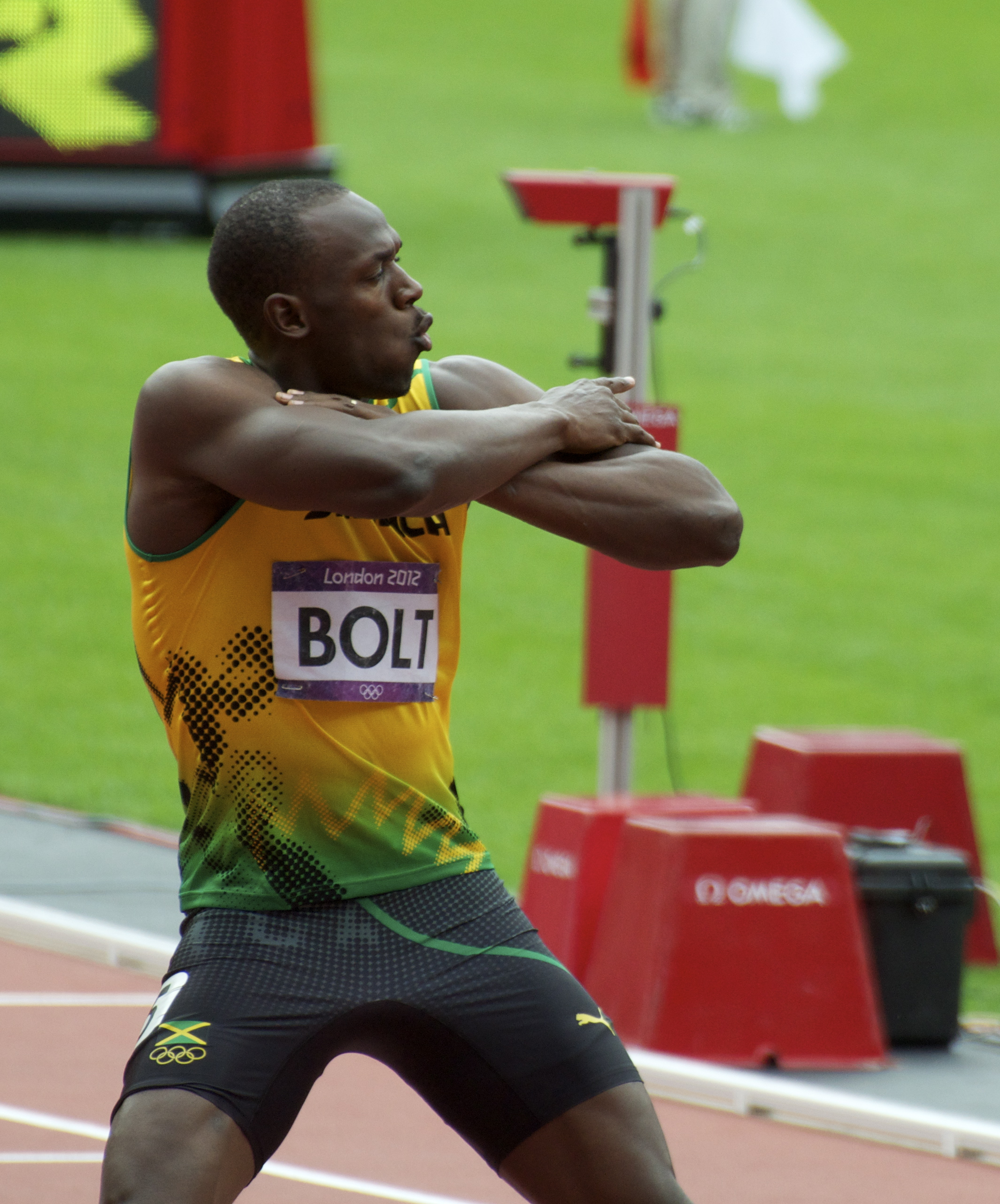
Usain BoltLondon2012

Social media created conversation on fan opinions regarding athletes, including 962,756 total mentions of Usain Bolt, “Fastest Man in History,” who defended the 100 meter and 200 meter gold medals. Michael Phelps followed with 828,081 total mentions.

Olympic sponsors were active on social media; created several campaigns to promote their brands; and inspired viewers with mass participation and personalized events. The Adidas “Take the Stage” Campaign recognized talent around the world, installing a photo booth and inviting the 550 Olympics athletes to take the stage. (IOC Marketing Report 2012). David Beckham surprised fans at the photo booth in Westfield shopping centre, gaining popularity in UK media. Coca-Cola, Acer Inc., McDonald's, Visa Inc. and several others used similar tactics of participation to attract viewers.

== 2014 Sochi Winter Olympics ==
=== Channels ===
The 2014 Winter Olympic Games were held in Sochi, a city in Krasnodar Krai, Russia, establishing the first “social media Olympics” for Russia. The most popular Russian social media and networking service, VK, created an Olympic page, similar to Facebook's. The Olympic VK page has 2.8 million fans and—the most popular official community on the platform. Throughout the games, VK had 54 million Olympic mentions, an average of 1.5 million per day.

Numbers grew on other social media pages: more than 2 million fans joined the Olympic Facebook page, 168,101 followed the Olympic Twitter, 150,000 followed the Olympic Instagram and three million visited the Olympic website in February 2014. There were 90,000 total updates on social media by Sochi 2014 Olympians and teams. The United States was the most active country during the games logging 22,598 posts across Facebook, Twitter, and Instagram.

=== Engagement ===
With social media there is also hashtags. The most popular hashtag was #sochi2014 with almost 11,000 uses. The next top five hashtags were #wearewinter, #teamusa, #olympics, #goaus and #wirfuerD. Another popular hashtag was #Sochiproblems, depicting local struggles. Photos of the poor state of Sochi on all platforms made the games the number one trending topic one week before the opening ceremony. #SochiFail and #SochiProblems gave multiple reports of the poor living arrangements, incomplete construction, broken elevators, and polluted waters. This was one way that social media provided awareness to its users.

=== Media Perceptions ===
Media perceptions varied during the games; the Olympics was viewed as a confrontation between Eastern and Western Civilizations. The LGBT community took a stand against the games. Sponsors for the games including Coca-Cola, Mcdonald's, and P&G protested against Russian authorities and Russian anti-LGBT laws. Many protests took a stand against Russian laws, which created a discussion between human rights advocates. Advocates believed organizations should not promote certain values in western markets while supporting an anti-human rights government in another market.

== 2016 Rio Summer Olympics ==
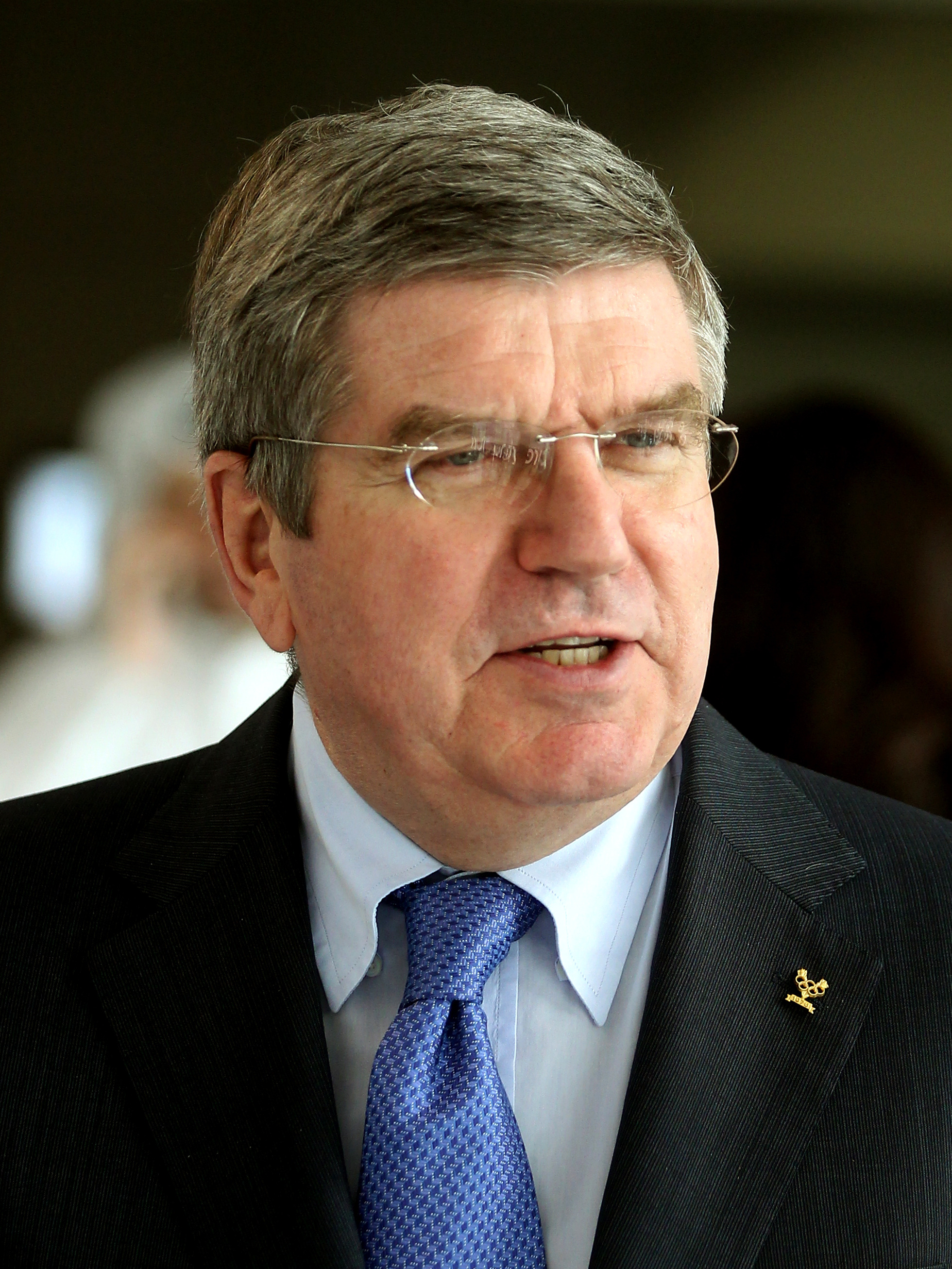
Thomas Bach

Social media marketing was an influential tool in the promotion and analysis of the 2016 Rio Olympics. Thomas Bach, President of the International Olympic Committee said that the power of sport demonstrates that diversity and interconnectedness can enlighten us all. With over 25,000+ sources of accredited media covering the games, the 2016 games were the most consumed Olympic games to date. Marketing for the Rio Olympics began in 2013 and ultimately lasted 3 years. There were 26 million visits to Olympic.org, the official website of the Olympic games, and over 7 billion views of official Olympic content on social media. There were over 270 digital media platforms covering the games and active engagement throughout various social media platforms including Facebook and Twitter.

Twitter saw over 187 million tweets inspired by the Rio Olympics, a 24.6 percent increase from the 2012 Summer Olympics. The 187 million tweets generated nearly 75 billion Twitter impressions. Throughout this same period, Twitter nearly doubled in size in terms of users, suggesting that there could have been an even larger growth in Twitter engagement. The hashtag, #Rio2016 was official content created by the IOC to generate buzz and encourage engagement.

Facebook saw 277 million people interact 1.5 billion times regarding the 2016 games. Comparatively to the London games, which saw 116 million posts, there was a significant increase in interaction. Facebook also used the Rio Olympics to debut their Sponsored Photo Frame aspect as an alternative method of advertising revenue and marketing outreach. The idea behind this innovation was to present a new advertising opportunity for the platform and to encourage alternative interaction in a similar way to which Snapchat uses paid and sponsored geographic filters.

The Rio Olympics was the first Olympics to utilize snapchat as a marketing tool. NBC directly partnered with Snapchat and BuzzFeed to promote the 2016 games.

== 2020 Tokyo Summer Olympics ==
The 2020 Tokyo Summer Olympics were postponed to 2021 due to the COVID-19 pandemic. Olympic fans took to social media to discuss and manage their emotions regarding the postponement. Some platforms explained the sequence of events that led to the postponement, while other shared historical moments. On Twitter, users used the postponement as a way to explain how dangerous the pandemic really is, as well as to bolster political arguments. The hashtag #tokyo2021 offered optimism among the negativity and fear.
