= XChat =

XChat may refer to:

- XChat (IRC client)
- XChat (messaging app by X)
