= Twitter (disambiguation) =

Twitter is the former name of the social network X.

Twitter may also refer to:

- Twitter, Inc., the former parent company of the social network until its merger with X Corp.
- Tweet (social media), the core post format on the platform
- History of Twitter, covering the platform's founding/creation in 2006, growth, initial public offering, and transition under new ownership
  - Acquisition of Twitter by Elon Musk, the 2022 purchase process that led to the platform's privatization and eventual rebranding
  - Twitter under Elon Musk, the period of changes, controversies, and developments on the platform, including the rebrand to X, following Elon Musk's ownership
  - Twitter Files, a series of releases of select internal Twitter documents published from December 2022 through March 2023 on Twitter

== See also ==
- X.com
