= Timeline of social media =

This page is a timeline of social media. Major launches, milestones, and other major events are included.

== Overview by decade ==
Decade	Description
1970s and prior	The PLATO system (developed at the University of Illinois and subsequently commercially marketed by Control Data Corporation) offers early forms of social media with Notes, PLATO's message-forum application; TERM-talk, its instant-messaging feature; Talkomatic, perhaps the first online chat room; News Report, a crowd-sourced online newspaper, and blog; and Access Lists, enabling the owner of a notes file or other application to limit access to a certain set of users, for example, only friends. Tom Truscott and Jim Ellis conceived the idea of Usenet in 1979 at the University of North Carolina at Chapel Hill and Duke University, and it was established in 1980.
1980s	As operating systems with a graphical user interface, such as Windows and Mac OS, begin to emerge and gain popularity, this creates an environment which allows for early social media platforms to thrive and exist. Bulletin board systems (BBS) and Internet Relay Chat (IRC) were popular during this time period, and IRC is still widely used today. The WELL, established in 1985, is one of the oldest still-operating online communities. Its name is an acronym for "The Whole Earth 'Lectronic Link", coined by Stewart Brand, creator of the Whole Earth Catalog.
1990s	The first massive social networking websites meant for outside of a specific group of users, LunarStorm, Classmates.com, and SixDegrees.com, are launched. Up to this point, most, if not all, social networks are meant for a specific audience (for ex. students at a university). ICQ is also launched, and remains operational up until the 2020s.
2000s	Various notable social media platforms such as Myspace, Facebook, and Twitter are developed and released, and blogging begins to gain popularity, with platforms like Blogger, WordPress, and Tumblr enabling easy creation of blogs with little to no effort. Instant messaging platforms such as AOL Instant Messenger (AIM) and Windows Live Messenger also become increasingly popular.
2010s	Many social media platforms are now thriving, and new ones are appearing sporadically. This includes popular blogs, instant messaging services (e.g. WhatsApp), and various social networking sites such as Facebook, LinkedIn, Snapchat, Twitter, and Instagram. With advances in smartphone technology, almost all social media services now have their own mobile apps, with some even having computer programs.
2020s	Following the impact of the COVID-19 pandemic on social media, many people have grown aware of the negative mental health consequences of excessive social media use and the widespread presence of misinformation across social media. Negative sentiments toward social media continue to grow, and many countries adopt new regulations, such as laws around screen time for children. The majority of users of social media services now prefer using mobile apps, with apps such as TikTok, Instagram, Threads, and X (formerly Twitter) garnering and maintaining hundreds of millions of active users daily. Most well-established platforms (and influencers) focus on optimizing content for engagement, algorithmic personalization, and maximizing revenue through targeted advertising.

== Timeline by year ==
Year	Event type	Description
1970s
1973	Milestone, Launch	Talkomatic is created by Dave Woolley and Douglas Brown at the University of Illinois, as a multi-user chat room application. It is an instant sensation among users in the PLATO System's online community.
1973	Launch	TERM-Talk is created by the staff at the Computer-based Education Research Laboratory at the University of Illinois, as an instant-messaging application enabling any two users on the PLATO system to conduct a live, character-by-character typed conversation on the bottom of the screen of their PLTO terminals. Soon many features would be added to it including "Monitor Mode," enabling one user in the TERM-talk to share their own screen with the other user, to ask questions or point out something that they're seeing. Years later this concept would be introduced as "Screen Sharing" or Remote Desktop Software.
1973	Launch	PLATO Notes is created by 17-year-old student Dave Woolley at the Computer-based Education Research Laboratory at the University of Illinois, as a conferencing and bulletin board forum system for communicating with the user community. In 1976, Notes expanded to enable any user to create a "notesfile" on any subject. PLATO Notes would serve as the inspiration for Lotus Notes developed by former PLATO users Ray Ozzie, Len Kawell, and Tim Halvorsen.
1974	Milestone	ARPANET evolved into the Internet following the publication of the first Transmission Control Protocol (TCP) specification, RFC 675 (Specification of Internet Transmission Control Program), written by Vint Cerf, Yogen Dalal and Carl Sunshine.
1980s
c. 1980	Milestone	Bulletin Board System (BBS) emerges as one of the earliest known forms of social media, and remains popular and under development until the late 1990s.
1982	Launch	The heta linjen emerges as a platform for telephonic group chats in Sweden because of a quirk in Televerket's exchange design.
1984	Launch	FidoNet forms as BBSs start to exchange email in North America and later internationally.
1985	Launch	The WELL is established, being one of the oldest still-operating online communities. Its name is an acronym for "The Whole Earth 'Lectronic Link", coined by Stewart Brand, creator of the Whole Earth Catalog.
1988	Milestone, launch	IRC rises from the roots of BBS (and was initially intended to extend it), offering a similar service and experience. It has remained in use to this day.
1990s
1995	Launch	Classmates.com, originally launched as a list of school affiliations, is launched in December 1995. The site, founded by Randy Conrads, later incorporated features to help former and current classmates find and contact each other online.
1996	Launch	The Swedish social networking website LunarStorm, originally called Stajlplejs, is launched in 1996. The site, founded by Rickard Eriksson, was renamed LunarStorm in 2000 and has been described as "the world's first social media on the Internet" by the founder.
1996	Launch	Hotline, a chat, bulletin board, and file-sharing program, is released. The Hotline client, with its graphical user interface in contrast to text-based IRC, let users connect to Hotline servers run by individuals and by corporate users like Apple and General Motors.
1996	Milestone, Launch	ICQ is released by Israeli company Mirabilis.
1996	Launch	Bolt.com was started as the first social networking and video website.
1997	Launch	Social networking website SixDegrees.com is created.
1997	Milestone, Launch	AOL Instant Messenger is released.
1998	Launch	Open Diary launches the first social blogging network, inventing the reader comment and friends-only content.
1998	Acquisition	ICQ is acquired by AOL, and the service is patented.
1999	Acquisition	SixDegrees.com is purchased by YouthStream Media Networks for $125 million.
1999	Launch	Yahoo Messenger instant messaging service launches.
1999	Launch	MSN Messenger (also known as Windows Live Messenger), a messaging, video and voice calling service, launches.
1999	Launch	LiveJournal, an early blogging platform and social network, launches.
1999	Launch	BlackPlanet, the first social network for the African American community, launches.
2000s
2000	Launch	Something Awful, an American comedy website, launches its forums.
2000	Launch	Habbo, a game-based social networking site, launches.
2000	Launch	Friends Reunited launches, exploiting a gap in the UK market following the success of US website Classmates.com
2001	Defunction	SixDegrees.com shuts down.
2001	Milestone, Launch	Windows Messenger is released, and is shipped with Windows XP. This is an integrated version of MSN Messenger.
2001	Launch	The Dutch journalism student Ramon Stoppelenburg launched Letmestayforaday.com as his personal social network, through which he collected invitations from all over the world to travel the world for free for over three years and write daily updates on his website in return.
2002	Launch	Social networking and gaming site Friendster launches. The service would be popular in Asia and the Pacific Islands.
2002	Launch	Meetup, a social gathering organization platform, launches.
2003	Launch	Business-oriented social networking service LinkedIn launches.
2003	Launch	Social networking website Hi5 launches.
2003	Launch	The business-oriented social networking website, XING, launches.
2003	Launch	4chan, an English-language imageboard, launches.
2003	Launch	Myspace launches.
2003	Launch	Skype, an instant messaging and video/voice calling service (VoIP), launches.
2004	Milestone, Launch	Facebook, the most popular social networking service to-date, launches.
2004	Launch	Flickr, an image and video hosting website, launches.
2004	Launch	Orkut, a social networking website owned by Google, launches.
2004	Launch	Tagged, a social discovery website, launches.
2005	Launch	Bebo, a social networking website, launches.
2005	Milestone, Launch	YouTube, a video-sharing website, launches.
2005	Acquisition	Myspace is acquired by News Corporation for $580 million.
2005	Launch	Qzone, a Chinese social networking website, launches.
2005	Launch	Reddit, an American social news aggregation, web content rating, and discussion website, launches.
2005	Launch	Renren, a Chinese social networking website, launches.
2005	Acquisition	Yahoo acquires Flickr.
2005	Launch	Facebook launches its photos feature with no restrictions on storage (but without the ability to tag friends).
2006	Launch	Twitter launches.
2006	Launch	VK (VKontakte), a Russian-based social networking service that resembles Facebook, launches.
2006	Launch	Facebook launches News Feed. The original news feed is an algorithmically generated and constantly refreshing summary of updates about the activities of one's friends.
2006	Launch	Nasza Klasa launches, later rebranded NK.pl, peaking in popularity by 2009, becoming the biggest social media in Poland and the 4th most-visited website in the country.
2007	Launch	Tumblr, a microblogging and social networking website, launches.
2007	Launch	FriendFeed, a real-time social media feed aggregator, launches.
2007	Launch	Justin.tv, a live-streaming that allowed anyone to broadcast video online, launches.
2008	Acquisition	AOL buys Bebo for $850 million.
2009	Acquisition	FriendFeed is acquired by Facebook for $15 million in cash, and $32.5 million in stock.
2009	Launch	Weibo, a Chinese microblogging website, launches.
2010s
2010	Launch	Pinterest, a photo-sharing website, launches.
2010	Acquisition	AOL sells ICQ to Mail.Ru (formerly known as Digital Sky Technologies) for $185 million.
2010	Acquisition	Bebo is sold by AOL to Criterion Capital Partners.
2010	Launch	Instagram, a photo/video sharing and social media service, launches.
2010	Launch	Path, a social networking-enabled photo sharing and messaging service for mobile devices, launches.
2010	Launch	Quora, a question-and-answer platform, launches.
2011	Launch	Snapchat, a photo/video sharing and social media service, launches.
2011	Acquisition	Microsoft acquires Skype Technologies for $8.5 billion.
2011	Launch	Google+, a social networking service, launches.
2011	Launch	Keek, a video-sharing and social media service, launches.
2011	Acquisition	Myspace is sold to Specific Media by News Corp. for $35 million.
2011	Launch	LinkedIn files for an IPO and trades its first shares under the NYSE symbol "LNKD", at $45 per share.
2011	Launch	Twitch, a live-streaming service, launches. This service is a spin-off from Justin.tv, as it is more focused on broadcasting users playing video games.
2011	Launch	Twitter overhauls its website to feature the "Fly" design, which the service says is easier for new users to follow and promotes advertising. In addition to the Home tab, the Connect and Discover tabs are introduced along with a redesigned profile and timeline of Tweets.
2012	Milestone	Facebook goes public, negotiating a share price of $38 apiece, valuing the company at $104 billion, the largest valuation to date for a newly listed public company.
2012	Launch	Snapchat launches video sharing, allowing users to share 10-second videos.
2012	Launch	Tinder, a dating-oriented social networking service, launches.
2012	Acquisition	Facebook acquires Instagram for $1 billion in cash and stock.
2013	Launch, Acquisition	Vine, a video-sharing and social media service, launches shortly after being acquired by Twitter for $30 million.
2013	Launch	Twitter files for its IPO, and begins trading on the New York Stock Exchange. The share closed at $44.90, giving the company a valuation of around $31 billion.
2013	Launch	Instagram launches video sharing.
2013	Acquisition	Tumblr is purchased by Yahoo! Inc. for $1.1 billion.
2013	Launch	Slack, an instant messaging service designed for internal use by organizations and professionals, launches.
2013	Launch	Yik Yak, a social media app for local discussion, is launched.
2013	Launch	8chan, a decentralized English-language imageboard, is launched by Fredrick Brennan.
2013	Launch	Patreon, a crowdfunding site that would later become a subscription service for content creators on social media sites, is launched.
2013	Acquisition	Bebo is purchased from Criterion Capitol Partners for $1 million by Bebo's founders.
2013	Launch	Instant messaging and video/voice calling service Google Hangouts launches.
2013	Launch	Telegram, launches service for exchange messages, share media, files, live location, hold private and group voice or video calls, as well public livestreams.
2013	Launch (Note: relaunch)	Myspace re-launches, coming out with a re-designed website, and a mobile app.
2014	Defunction	Justin.tv shuts downs to focus work on Twitch.
2014	Launch	Musical.ly, a lip-syncing app, launches.
2014	Launch	Snapchat launches collaborative timelines based on events.
2014	Acquisition	Amazon acquires Twitch for $970 million.
2014	Defunction	Orkut is shut down by Google.
2015	Defunction	Friendster shuts down due to "the evolving landscape in our challenging industry" and lack of engagement by the online community.
2015	Launch, Acquisition	Periscope, a live video sharing app, launches shortly after being acquired by Twitter.
2015	Launch	Bebo re-launches as a messaging app for iOS and Android.
2015	Launch	Beme, a short video-sharing app, launches. The creators are Casey Neistat and Matt Hackett.
2015	Launch	Discord, a free instant messaging and video/voice calling service (VoIP) designed for the gaming community, launches.
2015	Launch	Meerkat, an application similar to Periscope, launches.
2016	Launch	Triller, a video editing app, is converted into a social networking service by allowing users to follow each other and share their videos publicly.
2016	Acquisition	Microsoft acquires LinkedIn for $26.2 billion on 8 December 2016.
2016	Acquisition	Time Inc. buys Myspace and its parent company.
2016	Defunction, Milestone	Yahoo! discontinues its services for Windows, Mac, Linux, and Solaris clients in early August 2016. It now only supports Yahoo! Messenger on Android, iOS, and web clients.
2016	Defunction	Vine announced that Twitter would be discontinuing the Vine mobile app, later renamed to "Vine Camera".
2016	Acquisition	CNN acquires Beme, with the terms of acquisition remaining undisclosed.
2016	Launch	Mastodon, a free and open-source software for self-hosting interlinking social networking services, is launched.
2017	Launch	Gab, an alt-tech microblogging site, is launched publicly on 8 May 2017.
2017	Acquisition	ByteDance acquires Musical.ly for $1 billion.
2017	Launch	Pillowfort, a microblogging and social networking service, is launched, and is billed as an alternative to Tumblr.
2017	Defunction	Yik Yak is shut down following a rapid decline in users, accusations of rampant bullying, and the app's banning from some schools.
2017	~Acquisition	Snapchat files for its IPO, and begins trading on the New York Stock Exchange. The share closed at $24.48, giving the company a valuation of around $33 billion.
2017	Launch	TikTok, a short video-sharing and social media service, launches.
2017	Launch	Co–Star, an astrological social networking service, launches.
2017	Milestone	Tumblr announces a complete ban on adult content after Apple Inc. removes Tumblr from its App Store. The move triggers a massive drop in online traffic for Tumblr and a change in the internet landscape.
2017	Defunction	AIM is discontinued as a service.
2017	Defunction	Beme shuts down on 31 January, following its acquisition by CNN in 2016.
2018	Defunction	Yahoo! Messenger shuts down on 17 July 2018.
2018	Defunction	Musical.ly shuts down and migrates its users to TikTok.
2018	Defunction	Path announces the termination of its service on 17 September 2018. Its closure takes place nearly a month later, on 18 October 2018.
2018	Launch	Parler launches, an alt-tech social media billing itself as an unbiased and free speech alternative to larger social media platforms, such as Twitter and Facebook.
2019	Defunction	Google+ shuts down in April 2019 due to low user engagement and an API flaw.
2019	Acquisition	Verizon Media announces it will sell Tumblr to Automattic, owner of WordPress.com and backer of WordPress for less than $3 million.
2020s
2020	Launch	Clubhouse, an audio-chat social networking app, launches.
2020	Launch	BeReal, a messaging application that encourages users to share a photo or video of their lives once a day during a two-minute window, launches.
2021	Launch	Gettr, an alt-tech social media platform aimed at conservatives, is launched by Jason Miller, a former aide to U.S. President Donald Trump.
2021	Defunction	NK.pl was shut down on 27 July ending a near-15-year history of once the most popular social media in Poland. Arrival of Facebook to the Polish market being cited as one of the reasons for the departure of users and eventual closure.
2021	Launch	Yik Yak relaunches on the App Store.
2022	Launch	Truth Social, an alt-tech social media platform, is launched by former U.S. President Donald Trump.
2022	Acquisition	Twitter is acquired and taken private by businessman Elon Musk in a $44 billion deal. It is renamed to X.
2023	Launch	Nostr, decentralized network protocol for a distributed social networking system, launches.
2023	Launch	Bluesky, a decentralized microblogging platform, launches in closed beta.
2023	Milestone	2023 Reddit API controversy, in which Reddit announced they would begin charging for use of its API
2023	Launch	Threads, a platform that uses a user's Instagram account to create an account in a format similar to Twitter, is launched by Meta. More than 30 million accounts were made in the first 24 hours of the platform's existence.
2024	Acquisition	Italian technology conglomerate Bending Spoons acquires Meetup.
2024	Launch	Bluesky opens its platform to public registration.
2024	Acquisition	Digital World Acquisition Corp. acquires Truth Social.
2024	Milestone	First post on Twitter (now officially known as X) through the Neuralink brain-computer interface.
2024	Milestone	The Protecting Americans from Foreign Adversary Controlled Applications Act was signed into law.
2024	Milestone	Australia becomes the first country to have an age ban for under 16 on social media.
2024	Milestone	App Store Accountability Act is introduced to the United States Congress for consideration.
2025	Milestone	TikTok voluntarily suspends its services in the United States only for 12 hours, leaving a large number of users migrating to RedNote. This was due to uncertainty over whether the Protecting Americans from Foreign Adversary Controlled Applications Act, which took effect on 19 January 2025, would be enforced by President Joe Biden. Biden did not enforce the ban and neither did his successor Donald Trump, who took office the day after the ban legally went into effect. TikTok was the first social media app to suspend its services in the United States and the first to be legally banned in the United States.
2025	Acquisition	xAI acquires X Corp for $33 billion.
2025	Event	Telegram and xAI partnership is announced, with plans to integrate Grok into Telegram.
2025	Milestone	Florida bans kids under 16 from signing up social media.
2025	Defunction	Skype shuts down, following its decline in favor of Microsoft Teams, Slack, and Discord.
2025	Milestone	US orders mandatory social media screening of Harvard's student visa applicants.
2025	Milestone	Reddit sues AI company Anthropic, alleging inappropriate use of user-generated content without consent for model training.
2025	Launch	Snap launches Lens Studio.
2025	Event	X bans AI companies use of Twitter posts for training or fine-tuning.
2025	Milestone	India orders X accounts belonging to Chinese state media blocked.
2025	Milestone	Yandex, Meta Facebook and Instagram found spying on Android Chrome users since 2017.
2025	Launch	Bitchat launches, enabling users to chat over local Bluetooth mesh networks.
2025	Launch	Sora 2 app launches, allowing users to create, share, and view entirely AI-generated short videos, similar to TikTok. Critics of OpenAI characterized this as the company leaning into AI slop.
2025	Milestone	2025 Nepalese Gen Z protests
2025	Acquisition	Bending Spoons acquires AOL from Yahoo for approximately $1.4 billion.
2025	Launch	Group chats in ChatGPT launch.
2026	Milestone	New law signed in Virginia limits social media screen-time for children under 16 to one per day, unless parental consent is given.
2026	Launch	Instagram Instants launches, allowing users to instantly share images with specific groups of people.
2026	Milestone	India bans temporarily bans Telegram to reduce fraud among NEET test-takers.
2026	Launch	Google Search Console integrates data pertaining to prevalence of a creator's Instagram, TikTok, X, YouTube content in search results
2026	Launch	European Union announces W, a social media platform designed to serve as an alternative to X.
2026	Launch	X introduces Cashtags, allowing users on the platform to trade stocks through direct connection between X and brokerages.
2026	Launch	Nvidia launches new Synthetic Video Detector service to aid in prevention of fake news.
2026	Launch	YouTube AI launches deepfake detection feature to detect malicious use of creator likeness in YouTube videos.
2026	Milestone	X open-sources its For You ranking algorithm on GitHub.
2026	Milestone	X sends Nitter a cease and desist letter, resulting in its eventual shutdown.
2026	Launch	Retro, a friend-group oriented photo-sharing app launches, having raised $21M.
2026	Milestone	Meta settles for $17B in social media addiction lawsuit.
2026	Milestone	The Cyberspace Administration of China shuts down 100,000 social media accounts claiming they were spreading fake news part of its "positive energy mood" campaign
2026	Milestone	European Union announces plan to ban social media for children under 13 years of age. Children from age 13 to 15 will be limited to one hour per day via "mini accounts."
2026	Launch	Meta launches Muse (AI agent), which acts as a personal assistant across Meta's various applications.

== See also ==
- Timeline of Facebook
- Timeline of Instagram
- Timeline of LinkedIn
- Timeline of Pinterest
- Timeline of Snapchat
- Timeline of Twitter
- Timeline of YouTube
