= Timeline of X =

The history of X, formerly known as Twitter, can be traced back to a brainstorming session at Odeo.

== Major events ==
Time period	Key developments at X/Twitter
March 2006 – March 2007	Twitter launches as a product of parent company Odeo. It grows slowly until March 2007, where usage grows dramatically after it is showcased at the South by Southwest (SXSW) conference.
April 2007 – October 2008	Twitter grows rapidly under CEO Jack Dorsey, completing two funding rounds and launching official support for hashtags.
October 2008 – October 2010	Jack Dorsey steps down, and Evan Williams takes over as CEO. Twitter raises money, gets celebrity endorsements and publicity, and continues to grow rapidly. The first tweet from space occurs during this period. Twitter also announces that it will start allowing for advertising in the form of promoted tweets – "ordinary tweets that businesses and individuals want to highlight to a wider group of users."
October 2010 – October 2013	Evan Williams steps down as CEO, and Dick Costolo takes over.
October 2013	Twitter announces plans and files relevant legal documents in October 2013 so as to go public. In November 2013, it has its initial public offering. Post-IPO, the company's pace of acquisitions increases dramatically.
November 2014 – present	With the launch of features such as Instant Timeline, While You Were Away, Quality Filter, Curator, and Moments, Twitter diversifies beyond just being a reverse chronological stream of tweets by people you already follow.
July 2015 – present	Dick Costolo departs Twitter and Jack Dorsey assumes the role of interim CEO. Commentators note that the "founder's instincts" are influencing the product's new direction.
April 2022	Elon Musk and Twitter board reach a deal for Musk to acquire the company for $44 billion and take it private.
July 2023	Elon Musk rebrands Twitter to X.
March 2025	xAI acquires X Corp. for $33 billion.
February 2026	SpaceX acquires xAI for $250 billion.

== Full timeline ==
Year	Month and date	Event type	Event
2004	November	Prelude	Odeo, Twitter's parent company, is started.
2005	February	Prelude	Odeo's podcasting service is released, with very little public response.
2006	February 26–27	Creation	Jack Dorsey, Noah Glass, Evan Williams and Biz Stone discuss the idea of using text messaging to share statuses, and decide to work on the project. The original idea is attributed to Jack Dorsey, and called the status concept.
2006	Early March	Creation	The name Twitter (spelled twttr at the time and using a green site logo) is chosen for the service. The idea for the name is attributed to Noah Glass.
2006	March 21	Creation	Twitter is officially set up and Jack Dorsey sends the first tweet.
2006	July 15	Media coverage	Noah Glass tells Om Malik about Twitter (then called twttr), and Malik writes what appears to be the first ever news coverage of Twitter, and several people, including Malik himself, have commented on the accuracy (or lack thereof) of its predictions from the perspective of hindsight.
2006	August 3	Usage	Twitter users tweet about a mild (4.4 on the Richter scale) earthquake in California. The event helps Twitter's team see the potential of Twitter as a way for many people to contribute to the reporting of a live event, each from his or her own vantage point.
2006	September	Creation	Twttr renames itself Twitter after purchasing the Twitter.com domain name.
2006	September	Userbase	Twitter attempts to have a grand launch at the Love Parade, but gets very little traction there, with only 100 new signups.
2006	October	Financial/legal and company operation	Biz Stone, Evan Williams, Dorsey, and other members of Odeo, form Obvious Corporation and acquired Odeo, together with its assets—including Odeo.com and Twitter.com—from the investors and shareholders.
2007	March 12	Userbase	Twitter is highly successful at South by Southwest Interactive (SXSW) and gets a major bump in usage from the event. Commentator Steven Levy calls this a tipping point for Twitter.
2007	April	Financial/legal and company operation	Twitter spins off into its own company.
2007	June 26	Financial/legal	Twitter announces that it has closed a funding round led by Fred Wilson of Union Square Ventures. The five-million-dollar round values Twitter at $20 million.
2007	August 23	Usage	The hashtag (#), first proposed by user Chris Messina, debuts on Twitter.
2008	June 24	Financial/legal	Twitter announces the closure of its second funding round, welcoming new investors Bijan Sabet of Spark Capital and Jeff Bezos of Bezos Expeditions. Existing partners Union Square Ventures and Digital Garage also invest more.
2008	October 16	Company operation	It is announced that Jack Dorsey has stepped down from the CEO role at Twitter, and Evan Williams takes over.
2009	February 13	Financial/legal	Twitter announces the closure of yet another funding round, with new investors Peter Fenton of Benchmark Capital and Todd Chaffee of Institutional Venture Partners.
2009	April 17	Media coverage, userbase expansion	Evan Williams appears alongside Ashton Kutcher on Oprah Winfrey's show to explain Twitter to Oprah's audience.
2009	April 20 onward	Media coverage, userbase expansion	Executives from Twitter and WordPress head over to Iraq to expose the people there to social media and the Internet.
2009	April 30	Media coverage	Twitter executives Biz Stone and Evan Williams are included in the TIME 100.
2009	June 15–16	Usage	Twitter reschedules planned downtime for maintenance so as not to conflict with a large planned protest in Iran. Because a US State Department official had emailed Twitter about the planned protest, newspapers speculate that Twitter rescheduled its downtime because of pressure from the US government.
2009	October	Usage	Twitter posts are indexed in real time by Google Search (Google Real-Time Search).
2010	January 22	Usage	The first unassisted off-Earth Twitter message is posted from the International Space Station by NASA astronaut T. J. Creamer.
2010	April 13	Product	Twitter announces that it will start allowing for advertising in the form of promoted tweets – "ordinary tweets that businesses and individuals want to highlight to a wider group of users."
2010	September	Product	Implementation of hash-bang fragment URLs and AJAX-based page loading. Replaced by JavaScript PushState in early 2012 due to problems with compatibility and shareability.
2010	October 4	Company operation	Evan Williams steps down as CEO, and Dick Costolo, the erstwhile COO, takes over as CEO.
2011	April 5, April 20	Product	Twitter tests a new homepage and phased out the "Old Twitter." However, a glitch came about after the page was launched, so the previous "retro" homepage was still in use until the issues were resolved; the new homepage was reintroduced on April 20.
2011	July 5	Acquisition	Twitter acquires BackType, a real-time social analytics platform.
2011	September 8–9	Financial/legal	Twitter closes its Series G round, raising $800 million at a $8 billion valuation. Of the $800 million, $400 million buys off shares from existing investors and the remaining $400 million goes to the company.
2011	December 8	Product	Twitter overhauls its website once more to feature the "Fly" design, which the service says is easier for new users to follow and promotes advertising. In addition to the Home tab, the Connect and Discover tabs are introduced along with a redesigned profile and timeline of Tweets. The site's layout is compared to that of Facebook.
2012	February 21	Product	Twitter announces a partnership with Russian search engine Yandex. Yandex, a Russian search engine, finds value within the partnership due to Twitter's real time news feeds. Twitter's director of business development explained that it is important to have Twitter content where Twitter users go.
2012	March 21	Userbase	Twitter celebrates its sixth birthday while also announcing that it has 140 million users and sees 340 million tweets per day. The number of users is up 40% from their September 2011 number, which was said to have been at 100 million at the time.
2012	April	Company operation	Twitter announces that it is opening an office in Detroit, with the aim of working with automotive brands and advertising agencies. Twitter also expanded its office in Dublin.
2012	June 5	Product	A modified logo is unveiled through the company blog, removing the text to showcase the slightly redesigned bird as the sole symbol of Twitter.
2012	August 22	Product	Name of tweets' source client no longer displayed. Reinstated in December 2018.
2012	October 5	Acquisition	Twitter acquired a video clip company called Vine that launches (later) in January 2013. Twitter released Vine as a standalone app that allows users to create and share six-second looping video clips on January 24, 2013. Vine videos shared on Twitter are visible directly in users' Twitter feeds. Due to an influx of inappropriate content, it is now rated 17+ in Apple's app store.
2012	December 18	Userbase	Twitter announces it had surpassed 200 million monthly active users. Twitter hit 100 million monthly active users in September 2011.
2013	March 24	Product	Line breaks
2013	April 18	Product	Twitter launches a music app called Twitter Music for the iPhone.
2013	June 13	Product	Shutdown of public site API "1.0"
2013	August 28	Acquisition	Twitter acquires Trendrr, a real-time social data company.
2013	September 9	Acquisition	Twitter acquires MoPub.
2013	September 12	Financial/legal	Twitter announces that it has filed papers with the U.S. Securities and Exchange Commission ahead of a planned stock market listing.
2013	October 4	Financial/legal	Twitter releases an 800-page prospectus in preparation for the IPO.
2013	November 6–7	Financial/legal	On November 6, 70 million shares are priced at US$26 and issued by lead underwriter Goldman Sachs. On November 7, trading of the shares begins on the New York Stock Exchange. The share closes at US$44.90, giving the company a valuation of around US$31 billion.
2014	April	Product	Desktop website layout majorly redesigned. This layout served as main front end for desktop web users until July 2019.
2014	June 19	Acquisition	Twitter acquires SnappyTV.
2014	June 30	Acquisition	Twitter confirms acquisition of mobile ad retargeting startup TapCommerce.
2014	July 31	Acquisition	Twitter acquires password security startup Mitro and open sources the product.
2014	November 12	Product, userbase	Twitter announces "Instant Timeline"—a way to show users who have just created accounts interesting content even before they have followed anybody. Around the same time, Twitter announces that it will make the timeline more customized, highlighting to a user the most important tweets while they were away, rather than simply showing a reverse chronological feed. Other features announced include better video capability and the ability to share public tweets privately with one's followers to discuss them.
2014	December 2	Product	Twitter announces a new suite of anti-harassment tools and promises faster response times for abuse complaints.
2015	January 20	Acquisition	Twitter acquires India-based mobile marketing startup ZipDial.
2015	January 21	Product	Twitter officially launches its "While You Were Away" feature.
2015	January 27	Product	Launch of video uploading through mobile app and direct messaging in groups.
2015	February 11	Acquisition	Twitter announces that it has acquired Niche, an ad network for social media stars, founded by Rob Fishman and Darren Lachtman. The acquisition price is reportedly $50 million.
2015	February 17	Product	Twitter lets people share team accounts without sharing passwords, with its new TweetDeck Team feature.
2015	March 5	Product, monetization	Twitter announces that it will tap data from its Marketing Platform Partners and allow publishers to target ads to specific audiences based on that data.
2015	March 9	Acquisition	Twitter acquires Periscope, a live video streaming startup.
2015	March 23	Product	Twitter starts rolling out a "Quality Filter" to verified iOS users so that people can more easily keep bullying and unpleasant tweets out of their stream. A number of news articles commented that it worked quite well.
2015	March 31	Product	Twitter publicly launches Curator, a real-time search and filtering feature for media outlets, that some commentators call a Storify competitor.
2015	April 2	Acquisition	Twitter acquires TenXer, a platform for developers and engineers to collaborate more effectively.
2015	April 7	Product	Added feature to quote tweets
2015	April 28	Acquisition	Twitter acquires with $532 million in stock TellApart, an ad technology company with rich user profiles, and partners with DoubleClick, Google's ad exchange.
2015	April 28	Financial	Twitter shares fall in price by about 18% based on their disappointing quarterly revenue ($436 million), earning, and user growth numbers. The drop begins even before Twitter's official announcement because the results are scraped by financial intelligence firm Selerity from Twitter's website.
2015	May 18	Product	Twitter completes the rollout of its new search interface for logged-in web users.
2015	May 19	Use in other products	Google adds tweets to its mobile search results.
2015	June 11 (announcement), July 1 (planned change)	Company operation	Dick Costolo steps down as CEO, co-founder Jack Dorsey returns as interim CEO. Costolo will remain on the Board. Shares are up 3% on the announcement.
2015	June 17	Acquisition	Twitter acquires Cambridge-based machine learning startup Whetlab.
2015	September 30	Product	Twitter expands Buy buttons through partnerships with BigCommerce, Demandware, and Shopify.
2015	October 6	Product	Twitter debuts Twitter Moments, a way for people to get a quick overview of important tweets or chains of tweets that occurred recently.
2015	October 14	Company operation	Omid Kordestani leaves his job as Chief Business Officer at Google to become Executive Chairman at Twitter. His base salary is $50,000 and he is eligible for up to $12 million in stock based on the company's performance.
2015	November 3	Product	Twitter replaces the Favorite button with a Like button and the star symbol (used to symbolize favoriting) with a heart symbol. Twitter reports a 6% increase in usage of the feature after the change, and also appears to be experimenting with offering a more diverse set of emojis, prompting commentators to draw parallels with Facebook's Reactions feature.
2015	November 4	Product	Twitter launches a political transparency page, so that people can better engage with policy issues on Twitter.
2016	February–March	Product	Twitter rolls out a change to its feed, making recommended tweets the default option, rather than the reverse chronological format that it had used since launch. The rollout officially begins on February 10. The rollout is completed on March 17, 2016. Users are allowed to opt out, but Twitter reports in April 2016 that the percentage of users who opted out is in the "low single digits".
2016	May 24	Product	Twitter announces that attached photos and videos will not be counted towards the 140 character limitation, and that a tweet beginning with a handle will be seen by followers.
2016	June 14 or 15	Product	Added ability to retweet oneself
2016	June 20	Acquisition	Twitter acquires Magic Pony Technology, a company based out of London that has developed techniques of using neural networks (systems that essentially are designed to think like human brains) and machine learning to provide expanded data for images.
2016	June 24	Product	Twitter launches tags to location feeds with Foursquare. People can see which tweets are from a specific place.
2016	September 23	Acquisition (potential)	CNBC reports that Twitter is in talks with potential acquirers including Google and Salesforce.com. On the same day, TechCrunch reports on the departure of two key Twitter team members.
2016	October 21	Downtime	A distributed denial of service attack on DNS provider Dyn's servers in the United States East Coast causes DNS resolution problems for many websites include Twitter, Reddit, GitHub, Spotify, and others, mostly for users in the Americas.
2016	October 27	Company operation	Twitter announces that it plans to cut 350 jobs (around 9% of its global workforce).
2016	October 27	Vine	Vine announces that Twitter would be discontinuing the Vine mobile app. Vine says users of the service would be notified before any changes to the app or website are made. The company also states that the website and the app will be still available for users to view and download Vines; however, users will no longer be able to post.
2016	November 1	Company operation	Rishi Jaitly, Twitter's head of India, announces his departure from the company.
2016	November 9	Company operation	Adam Bain, Twitter's chief operating officer, announces he will leave the company.
2016	December 1	Acquisition	Twitter acquires Yes, Inc., the company that made several apps including Frenzy. All of Yes's apps would shut down. In the process of the acquisition, Keith Coleman, who had served as CEO of Yes, becomes a new vice president of product for Twitter.
2016	December 20	Company operation	Adam Messinger, Twitter's chief technology officer, announces his departure from the company. On the same day, Josh McFarland, a vice president of product, also announces his departure from Twitter.
2017	January		Twitter announces that it would shut down the Twitter Dashboard.
2017	January 12	Competition	The founders of App.net announce that the platform will shut down on March 14, 2017. App.net has been called "an ad-free, subscription-based, Twitter clone". The source code for App.net will be made available through its GitHub account.
2017	January 18	Acquisition	Twitter announces it has sold Fabric, Twitter's developer platform, to Google.
2017	January 20	Vine	Twitter launches an online archive of Vine videos.
2017	January 26	Product	Twitter launches the "Explore" tab, which replaces the "Moments" tab. The Explore tab bundles together Moments, trends, live video streams, and search.
2017	January 27	Legal	Twitter releases two national security letters it had received from the United States federal government. The release followed the lifting of the gag order placed on Twitter to not release the letters. The letters are from September 2015 and June 2016.
2017	March 30	Product	Usernames no longer inside tweet replies
2017	March 31	Product	Default profile picture changed from egg with randomly coloured background to grey person silhouette.
2017	April 6	Product	Introduction of "Twitter Lite", a progressive web app for mobile users.
2017	April	Product	Font size of tweets in timeline consistent; some tweets' font no longer appears larger.
2017	June 15	Product	Redesign of user interface icons such as "like", "retweet", "reply", and circular profile pictures, following a trend widely adapted by other large social media sites.
2017	November 7	Product	Twitter increases tweets' character limit from 140 to 280 for all accounts. The earliest rollout to select accounts happened in September.
2017	November 10	Product	Twitter increases display names' character limit from 20 to 50 characters.
2017	December	Product	Ability to post threads of multiple tweets at once
2018	July 13	Product	Locked and suspended accounts no longer add to profiles' follower counts, making the appearance of a sudden drop in following on popular accounts.
2018	September	Legal	Jack Dorsey testifies before the U.S. senate alongside Facebook COO Sheryl Sandberg.
2018	December 20	Product	Tweet source label reinstated on the website and mobile app, after previously removed in August 2012.
2019	March	Product	Earliest trial of vertical left-side navigation bar column on the progressive web app ("Twitter Web App"). Gradually rolled out, starting with Microsoft Windows 10 users. In June 2019, this layout was rolled out to all users of "Twitter Web App".
2019	May 7	Product	Added ability to attach media (images or a video) to quote tweets
2019	June	Company Operation	Twitter reveals data showing thousands of fake accounts linked to foreign governments like Iran and Russia.
2019	July 15	Product	Progressive web app front end (known as "Twitter Web App", formerly "Twitter Lite") set to default for desktop website users.
2019	July 15	Product	TLS 1.0 and 1.1 support ended, placing Twitter among the earliest sites to do so.
2019	September 5	Product	Line breaks in biography texts
2020	March	Product	Multimedia viewer overhaul for desktop users of "Twitter Web App", with the host tweet and its replies appearing in a scrollable and retractable side bar on the right, similarly to Facebook and Instagram. Gradually rolled out.
2020	June 1	Product	Legacy (2014) web front end, also known as "Twitter Web Client", discontinued.
2020	August 11	Product	Ability to limit replies to individual tweets to followed or mentioned users. First tested in May 2020. Expanded to be adjustable after tweeting in July 2021.
2020	August 26	Product	Added counter for quote tweets
2020	November	Product	Trial with changed retweeting behaviour, where users are prompted to quote the tweet with a comment rather than a menu with a selection between both. A quoteless retweet would only be done if nothing was entered in the text box. The trial lasted for a month.
2020	December 15-16	Product	Shutdown of "M2" mobile web front end which commenced as mobile front end in the early 2010s and later served as fallback to low-end devices/browsers, as well as browsers with JavaScript deactivated or unsupported.
2021	May	Product	Removal of the automated picture cropping algorithm used for previews in tweets and timelines.
2021	October 14	Product	First trial of downvoting feature
2022	April 25	Company operation	Elon Musk and Twitter board reach a deal for Musk to acquire the company for $44 billion and take it private.
2022	August 1	Product	Initial tests of "tweets per month" counter.
2022	August 23	Legal	Contents of Whistleblower complaint to the United States Congress is published, alleging multiple violations of United States securities regulations, the Federal Trade Commission Act of 1914, and a 2011 enforceable consent decree reached with the Federal Trade Commission after several issues between 2007 and 2010.
2022	October 27	Company operation	Elon Musk completed the acquisition of Twitter.
2022	November 1-9	Product	Announcement of new version of Twitter Blue with verification system, costing $7.99 per month. Launched 8 days later.
2022	November 8	Product	Addition of "Official" label for government, company, and public figure accounts
2022	November 18-19	Company operation	Elon Musk reinstates several previously banned accounts, including Donald Trump
2022	December 10	Product	Relaunch of Twitter Blue with higher price on iOS
2022	December 18	Product	Brief ban on posting links to other social media platforms, reverted a day later
2022	December 19	Company operation	Elon Musk runs a poll asking if he should resign as Twitter's CEO.
2022	December 19	Product	Launch of gold verified checkmarks and square profile pictures for brands as part of Twitter Blue for Business, as well as gray checkmarks for government accounts
2022	December 23	Product	Addition of public view counter (or "impression counter") to individual tweets.
2023	January 19	Product	Twitter bans third-party client apps, resulting in the discontinuation of apps like Twitterrific and Tweetbot.
2023	February 17	Product	Twitter starts charging for SMS two-factor authentication, with the feature being limited to Twitter Blue subscribers effective March 20
2023	March 23	Product	Announcement of discontinuation of legacy verified checkmarks as of April 1, later delayed to April 20
2023	March 31	Product	Twitter's algorithm is made open source
2023	April 3-6	Product	Twitter briefly replaces its logo with a Doge logo for 3 days.
2023	April 10	Company operation	Twitter, Inc. is merged with X Corp.
2023	April 20	Product	Discontinuation of legacy verified checkmarks
2023	May 12	Company operation	Linda Yaccarino is appointed as Twitter's new CEO following Musk's resignation
2023	June 12	Company operation	Linda Yaccarino begins her tenure as Twitter's CEO
2023	June 30	Product	Unregistered users are blocked from accessing profiles and tweets, citing data scraping from AI companies
2023	July 3	Product	Relaunch of new TweetDeck for verified users
2023	July 23	Product	Elon Musk rebrands Twitter to "X".
2023	August 5	Product	Twitter Blue is rebranded to X Premium
2023	August 15	Product	TweetDeck (rebranded to X Pro) now requires subscription
2023	August 25	Product	Launch of X Hiring for Verified Organizations
2023	October 4	Product	Headlines removed from links in posts
2023	October 25	Product	Launch of audio and video calls
2023	October 27	Product	Launch of additional Premium subscription tiers (Basic, Premium, and Premium+)
2023	November 3	Product	Launch of Grok chatbot for X Premium subscribers
2023	November 16	Company operation	Multiple companies pull advertising from X after Musk's antisemitic posts
2023	December 21	Outage	Global outage of X
2024	January 2	Product	Headlines are re-added to article links with small text
2024	March 17	Product	Grok is made open source
2024	April 3	Product	Gifting of Premium subscriptions to accounts with over 2,500 verified followers, and Premium+ for accounts with over 5,000 verified followers
2024	May 17	Product	URL is changed from Twitter.com to X.com
2024	June 11	Product	Likes are made private for all users
2024	July 16	Company operation	Elon Musk announces plans to move X's headquarters to Texas
2024	August 30	Legal	Judge Alexandre de Moraes orders a ban of X in Brazil
2024	September 13-18	Company operation	X Corp. closes its former headquarters in San Francisco and subsequently moves to Bastrop, Texas.
2024	October 8	Legal	Brazil lifts its ban on X imposed on August 30
2024	October 16	Product	Changes to the blocking feature are announced, allowing users who they have blocked to see their posts
2024	November 3	Product	Blocking changes are officially implemented
2024	November 15	Product	New terms of service take effect, requiring users to consent to their posts being used for AI training.
2024	December 6	Product	Grok is released to all users
2024	December 23	Product	Premium+ subscription price raised by 40%
2025	January 9	Product	Standalone Grok iOS app launched in the US
2025	January 28	Product	X Payments (now renamed to X Money) is announced to be launched later in 2025
2025	March 10	Outage	X suffers major outage as a result of a DDoS attack.
2025	March 19	Company operation	X's valuation raised to $44 billion after decline
2025	March 28	Company operation	xAI acquires X Corp. for $33 billion.
2025	June 1	Product	XChat, a new messaging system, begins rolling out
2025	June 5	Legal	New policy prohibits companies from using posts for training AI models
2025	July 9	Company operation	Linda Yaccarino steps down from her role as CEO of X
2025	August 5	Product	New Grok image and video generator launches, including "spicy mode"
2025	August 12-25	Legal	Elon Musk sues Apple and OpenAI for alleged manipulation of App Store rankings and maintaining illegal monopolies via ChatGPT
2025	October 19	Product	Launch of X Handle Marketplace for Premium subscribers
2025	November 17	Product	Launch of Chat encrypted DM service to all users
2025	November 18	Outage	X suffers major outage, related to a Cloudflare outage.
2025	November 23	Product	Launch of "About this Account" feature, displaying where the user is located
2025	December 17	Legal	X sues Operation Bluebird for alleged trademark infringement, following a failed attempt to reclaim the Twitter trademark, which is alleged to have been abandoned
2026	February 2	Company operation	SpaceX acquires xAI for $250 billion.
2026	February 12	Product	Dim mode is removed as a result of low capacity

== See also ==
- History of Twitter
- History of Facebook
- History of YouTube
- History of TikTok
- Timeline of Snapchat
- Timeline of Pinterest
- Timeline of LinkedIn
- Timeline of social media
