= Timeline of LinkedIn =

LinkedIn logo

This is a timeline of the online, work-focused, social networking service LinkedIn.

== Big picture ==
Time period	Key developments at LinkedIn
2002–2010	LinkedIn is founded, introduces premium services for generating revenues, achieves profitability in 2006 (being the first major social network/Web 2.0 enterprise to do so), becomes the most popular site for work-based networking, and acquires its first startups. It reaches 70 million users by June 2010.
2011–2016	LinkedIn goes IPO, reaches beyond 100 million users, and expands more aggressively internationally. It reaches 300 million members in 2013, and 400 million in 2016. LinkedIn gets acquired by Microsoft in June 2016.

== Full timeline ==
Year	Month and date	Event type	Details
2002	December 14	Company	LinkedIn is founded by Reid Hoffman and 4 other friends.
2003	May 5	Company	LinkedIn cofounders send invitations, launching LinkedIn.
2004	May	Competition	Viadeo – a social networking site for business owners, entrepreneurs and managers – is launched in France.
2004	August	Growth	LinkedIn reaches 1 million users.
2005	July	Product	LinkedIn launches LinkedIn for Groups, a premium service aimed at power users like recruiters, analysts and researchers.
2005	August	Product	LinkedIn launches a premium service, LinkedIn Business Accounts, which gives businesses access to more powerful search tools.
2006	March	Company	LinkedIn achieves its first month of profitability.
2007	February	Team	Dan Nye becomes CEO of LinkedIn, and Reid Hoffman moves from CEO to chairman and president.
2007	April	Growth	LinkedIn reaches 10 million users.
2007	May	Product	LinkedIn launches "who's been viewing your profile" feature.
2008	February	Product	LinkedIn launches a mobile version of the site.
2008	April	Product	LinkedIn launches the "People You May Know" feature.
2008	June	Funding	Sequoia Capital, Greylock Partners, and other venture capital firms purchase a 5% stake in the company for $53 million, giving the company a post-money valuation of approximately $1 billion.
2008	September	Product	LinkedIn launches targeted advertising - allowing advertisers to target specific sections of LinkedIn users (InCrowds) based on the information in their profiles.
2008	October	Product	LinkedIn enables an "applications platform" that allows other online services to be embedded within a member's profile page. Among the initial applications are an Amazon Reading List that allows LinkedIn members to display books they are reading, a connection to Tripit, and a Six Apart, WordPress and TypePad application that allows members to display their latest blog postings within their LinkedIn profile.
2009	December	Internationalization	LinkedIn opens office in India, and says that 50% of its userbase is now international.
2010	March	Internationalization	LinkedIn opens an International Headquarters in Dublin, Ireland.
2010	July	Funding	LinkedIn receives a $20 million investment from Tiger Global Management LLC at a valuation of approximately $2 billion.
2010	August 4	Acquisitions	LinkedIn announces its first acquisition, mSpoke, for its "adaptive personalization engine". The acquisition was for $0.6 million.
2010	September 23	Acquisitions	LinkedIn acquires ChoiceVendor, a business-to-business review service, for $3.9 million.
2011	January 26	Acquisitions	LinkedIn acquires CardMunch, a business card scanning application, for $1.7 million. The service would shut down in 2014 and users would be forced to migrate to Evernote.
2011	May 19	Company	LinkedIn IPOs and trades its first shares under the NYSE symbol "LNKD", at $45 per share.
2011	July	Product	LinkedIn launches a new feature allowing companies to include an "Apply with LinkedIn" button on job listing pages. The new plugin will allow potential employees to apply for positions using their LinkedIn profiles as resumes. All applications will also be saved under a "Saved Jobs" tab.
2011	October 5	Acquisitions	LinkedIn acquires Connected, a social customer relationship management service.
2011	October 11	Acquisitions	LinkedIn acquires IndexTank, a social search service.
2012	February 22	Acquisitions	LinkedIn announces that it will acquire Rapportive, a Gmail plugin that shows people the social media profiles from whoever they're corresponding with on Gmail.
2012	May 3	Acquisitions	LinkedIn acquires SlideShare for $119 million. SlideShare is a web service that allows people to upload presentations and share them with everyone.
2012	June	Company	LinkedIn falls victim to a hacking attempt that resulted in 6.5 million hashed passwords reportedly leaked - revealing that LinkedIn does not use password salting. In 2016, the company reveals that the breach was far greater than originally thought.
2012	September	Product	LinkedIn starts allowing users to endorse each other's skills.
2012	October	Product	LinkedIn launches the "Influencer" program, allowing selected "thought leaders" (their term) to share original content directly with LinkedIn users.
2013	January	Competition	TalentBin launches. It is a "search engine" for talented people that picks up their digital tracks (on sites like Stack Exchange) to sell to recruiters.
2013	July 23	Product	LinkedIn announces their Sponsored Updates ad service. Individuals and companies can now pay a fee to have LinkedIn sponsor their content and spread it to their user base. This is a common way for social media sites such as LinkedIn to generate revenue.
2013	April 11	Acquisitions	LinkedIn acquires Pulse, a popular newsreader for the web and mobile, for $90 million.
2013	September	Legal	A class action lawsuit is filed against LinkedIn, accusing it of automatically sending invitations to contacts in a user's email address book without permission. The court agreed with LinkedIn that permission had in fact been given for invitations to be sent, but not for the two further reminder emails.
2014	February 6	Acquisitions	LinkedIn acquires Bright.com, a job matching website, for $120 million.
2014	April	Internationalization	LinkedIn launches a new Chinese website in the Chinese language.
2014	April	Company	LinkedIn leases 222 Second Street, a 26-story building under construction in San Francisco's SoMa district, to accommodate up to 2,500 of its employees
2014	July 14	Acquisitions	LinkedIn acquires Newsle, a service that allows users to follow real news about their Facebook friends, LinkedIn contacts, and public figures.
2014	July 22	Acquisitions	LinkedIn acquires Bizo, a web application that helps advertisers reach businesses and professionals, for $175 million.
2015	January 14	Competition	Facebook announces launch of Facebook at Work, which allows businesses to create their own social networks amongst their employees that are built to look and act like Facebook itself.
2015	February	Legal	LinkedIn settles a class action lawsuit, compensating up to 800,000 people who paid for its premium services who alleged that it falsely assured them it was using strong security measures to protect their personal information.
2015	March 16	Acquisitions	LinkedIn acquires Careerify, a web application that helps businesses hire people using social media.
2015	April 2	Acquisitions	LinkedIn acquires Refresh.io, a web application that provides insights about people in one's networks right before one meets them.
2015	April 9	Acquisitions	In its largest acquisition to date ($1.5 billion), LinkedIn announces its acquisition of Lynda.com, an eLearning platform allowing users to learn business, technology, software, and creative skills through videos.
2015	May 7	Product	LinkedIn adds an analytics tool to its publishing platform. The tool allows authors to better track traffic that their posts receive.
2015	August 28	Acquisitions	LinkedIn acquires Fliptop, a predictive sales and marketing firm that uses data science to help companies close more sales.
2015	October	Product	LinkedIn introduces new mobile app, codenamed "Project Voyager", making the design more intuitive.
2016	February 4	Acquisitions	LinkedIn acquires Connectifier, a web application that helps companies with their recruiting.
2016	February	Company	LinkedIn's shares drop 43.6% within a single day following an earnings report, down to $108.38 per share. LinkedIn loses $10 billion of its market capitalization that day.
2016	June 13	Acquisitions	Microsoft announces the acquisition of LinkedIn at $26.2 billion ($60 per user). The acquisition would be completed on December 8, 2016. The transaction would result in the payment of approximately $26.4 billion in cash merger consideration.
2016	July 26	Acquisitions	LinkedIn acquires PointDrive, a web application that lets salespeople share visual content with prospective clients to help seal the deal.
2016	September 12	Product	LinkedIn unveils three new products that it will roll out in India: (1) LinkedIn Lite, a smaller version of the mobile website for people with slower internet connections; (2) LinkedIn Placements, an online screening test intended for students to take; and (3) Starter Pack, a marketing package for small and mid-sized businesses.
2016	September 22	Product	LinkedIn launches LinkedIn Learning. The new website caters both to employees seeking career advancement as well as employers wishing to train their employees. A large part of the content is from Lynda, which LinkedIn had acquired in April 2015.
2016	October 6	Product	LinkedIn launches Open Candidates, a feature that allows users to signal to recruiters that they are looking for a job. The feature allows only those recruiters using LinkedIn's premium-tier service to see whether a user is using Open Candidates.
2016	November 17	Internationalization	LinkedIn begins to be blocked in Russia due to a law in Russia that requires online services to store personal data of Russian citizens on Russian servers. LinkedIn remains accessible in Russia via virtual private networks. At the time of the block, LinkedIn has 6 million registered users in Russia.
2017	January 6	Internationalization	The Russian government requires Google and Apple to remove the LinkedIn app from their Russian app stores.
2017	January 19	Product	LinkedIn unveils its new desktop website redesign, which will roll out over several weeks. The new design is said to have "a simpler, app-like look" and be similar to the design of Facebook's desktop website.
2017	February 15	Competition	In the United States and Canada, Facebook launches a feature to search for jobs. The feature allows businesses to post job openings through the status update composer, and allows users to apply to those job postings.

== See also ==
- Timeline of social media
