= Google Digital Garage =

Non-profit organization

Google Digital Garage is a nonprofit program designed to help people improve their digital skills. It offers free training, courses and certifications via an online learning platform and educational partnerships. Google Digital Garage was created by Google in 2015.

== Courses ==
The courses are broken up into modules. The Google Digital Garage offers over 100 online courses on various subjects, under the following digital marketing and coding categories:

- Data and Tech
- Digital Marketing
- Career Development
- Search Engine Optimization

== Initiatives ==
In 2015, Google Digital Garage participated in the Northern Ireland Department of Personnel's DigitalNI Google Garage event. The event was part of the GO ON NI digital literacy event and included partners like BT and Barclays, alongside Google. Google Digital Garage hosted a similar live event in Northampton, UK in 2023.

== Partnerships ==
In November 2018, the UK Department for International Trade (DIT) and Google announced a partnership to deliver an export education series for small and medium-sized enterprises (SMEs). The initiative, part of the Exporting is GREAT campaign, aimed to help 2,000 SMEs grow their digital export operations through seminars in 2019. Google's Digital Garage hosted events and education hubs in Manchester, Edinburgh, and various university campuses across the UK, would focus on finding global opportunities, setting up export operations, and marketing. The hub in Edinburgh was closed in 2019.

== Certifications ==
Google grants certification upon completion of the Fundamentals of Digital Marketing course (taught by University and Interactive Advertising Bureau Europe).
