= History of Twitter =

History of social media site Twitter

Jack Dorsey first began to develop his early idea for the social media site Twitter in 2006 while working at early Internet tech company Odeo. After it spun off in 2007 and expanded rapidly after that, Twitter became a significant component of global society. It became a key part of politics and international relations but was also banned or blocked in some countries.

Twitter went public in 2013 and continued to expand. Elon Musk took Twitter private in 2022 and later changed the name of the service to X.

== Background ==
TXTMob was one of the example services which was used as a model for the service Twitter when it was originally created.

Twitter's origins lie in a "daylong brainstorming session" held by board members of the podcasting company Odeo. Jack Dorsey, then an undergraduate student, introduced the idea of an individual using an SMS service to communicate with a small group. The original project code name for the service was twttr, an idea that Evan Williams later ascribed to Noah Glass, inspired by Flickr and the five-character length of American SMS short codes. The decision was also partly due to the fact that the domain twitter.com was already in use, and it was six months after the launch of twttr that the crew purchased the domain and changed the name of the service to Twitter. The developers initially considered "10958" as the service's short code for SMS text messaging, but later changed it to "40404" for "ease of use and memorability".

== 2006–2007 ==
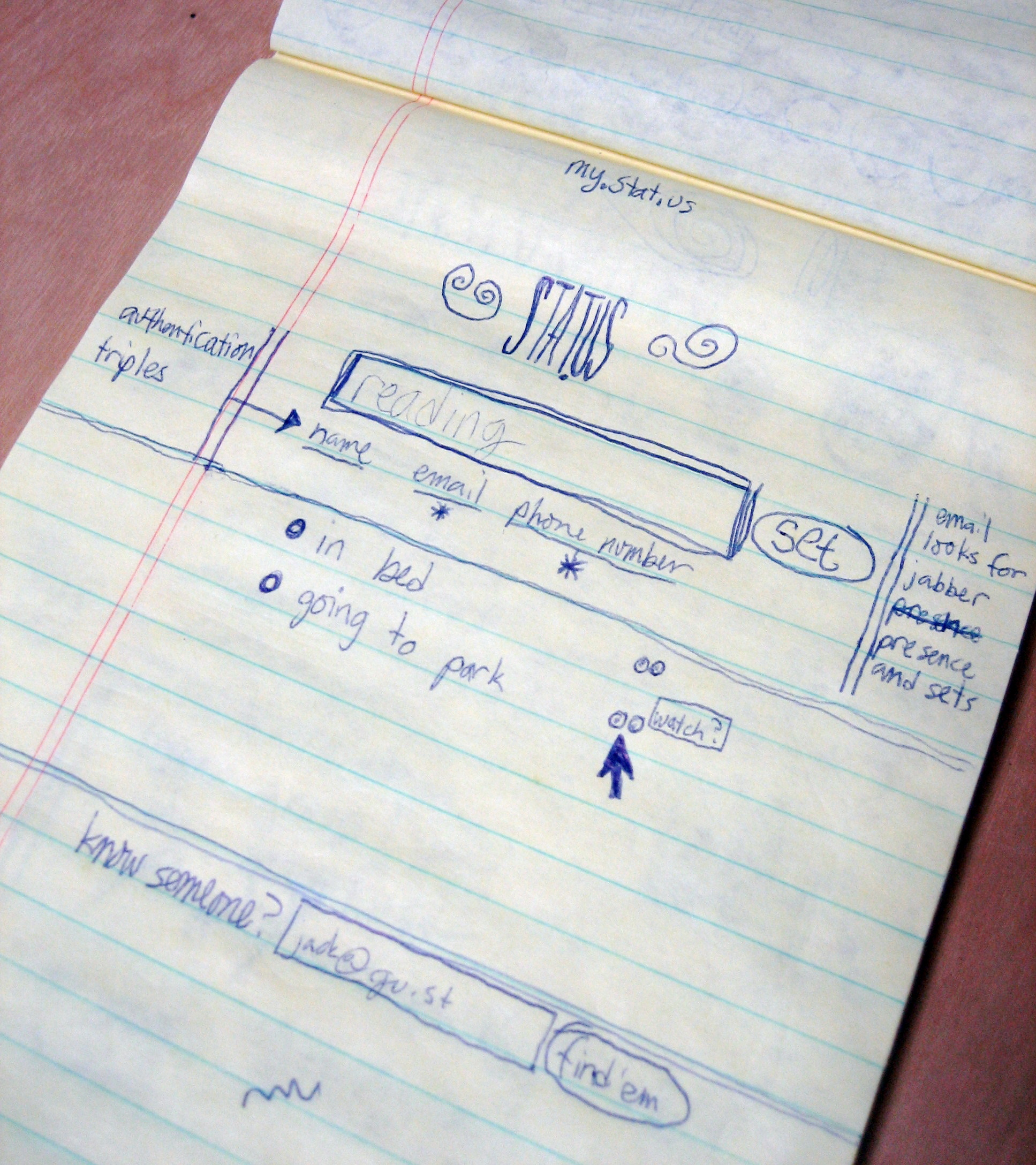
A sketch, c. 2006, by Jack Dorsey, envisioning an SMS-based social network

Work on the project which would become Twitter started in February 2006. In March 2006 Dorsey published the first Twitter post: "just setting up my twttr."

Dorsey has explained the origin of the "Twitter" title:

...we came across the word "twitter", and it was just perfect. The definition was "a short burst of inconsequential information", and "chirps from birds". And that's exactly what the product was.

The first Twitter prototype, developed by Dorsey and contractor Florian Weber, was used as an internal service for Odeo employees. The full version was introduced publicly on July 15, 2006. In October 2006, Biz Stone, Evan Williams, Dorsey, and other members of Odeo formed Obvious Corporation and acquired Odeo, together with its assets—including Odeo.com and Twitter.com—from the investors and shareholders. Williams fired Glass, who was silent about his part in Twitter's startup until 2011. Twitter spun off into its own company in April 2007.

Williams provided insight into the ambiguity that defined this early period in a 2013 interview:

With Twitter, it wasn't clear what it was. They called it a social network, they called it microblogging, but it was hard to define, because it didn't replace anything. There was this path of discovery with something like that, where over time you figure out what it is. Twitter actually changed from what we thought it was in the beginning, which we described as status updates and a social utility. It is that, in part, but the insight we eventually came to was Twitter was really more of an information network than it is a social network.

In 2006, Iconfactory was developing a twitter application called "Twitterrific" and developer Craig Hockenberry began a search for a shorter way to refer to "Post a Twitter Update." In 2007 they began using "twit" before Twitter developer Blaine Cook suggested that "tweet" be used instead.

The use of the hashtag appeared in 2007, introduced by Chris Messina. Messina struggled to get Twitter executives to adopt his idea but was eventually successful in convincing Twitter to trial the idea. Messina drew inspiration from Internet Relay Chat and Jaiku however the way it was implemented on Twitter was unique. Initial reactions to the hashtag were mixed.

== 2007–2010 ==
The tipping point for Twitter's popularity was the 2007 South by Southwest Interactive (SXSWi) conference. During the event, Twitter usage increased from 20,000 tweets per day to 60,000. "The Twitter people cleverly placed two 60-inch plasma screens in the conference hallways, exclusively streaming Twitter messages," remarked Newsweek's Steven Levy. "Hundreds of conference-goers kept tabs on each other via constant twitters. Panelists and speakers mentioned the service, and the bloggers in attendance touted it." Reaction at the conference was highly positive. Twitter staff received the festival's Web Award prize with the remark "we'd like to thank you in 140 characters or less. And we just did!"

The company experienced rapid initial growth. In 2009, Twitter won the "Breakout of the Year" Webby Award. On November 29, 2009, Twitter was named the Word of the Year by the Global Language Monitor, declaring it "a new form of social interaction". In February 2010, Twitter users were sending 50 million tweets per day. By March 2010, the company recorded over 70,000 registered applications. As of June 2010, about 65 million tweets were posted each day, equaling about 750 tweets sent each second, according to Twitter. As of March 2011, that was about 140 million tweets posted daily. As noted on Compete.com, Twitter moved up to the third-highest-ranking social networking site in January 2009 from its previous rank of twenty-second.

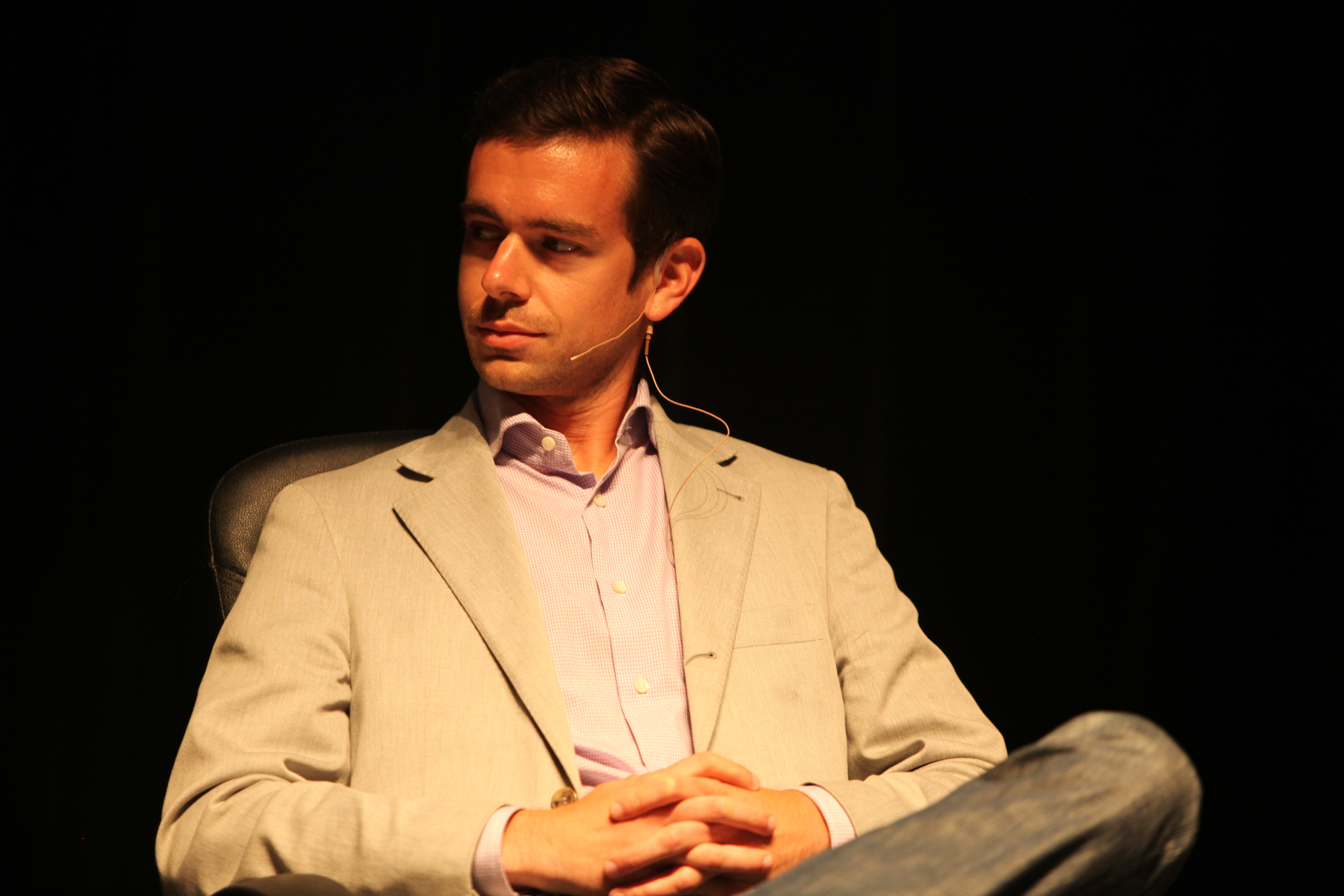
Jack Dorsey, co-founder and former CEO of Twitter, in 2009

Twitter's usage spikes during prominent events. For example, a record was set during the 2010 FIFA World Cup when fans wrote 2,940 tweets per second in the thirty-second period after Japan scored against Cameroon on June 14, 2010. The record was broken again when 3,085 tweets per second were posted after the Los Angeles Lakers' victory in the 2010 NBA Finals on June 17, 2010, and then again at the close of Japan's victory over Denmark in the World Cup when users published 3,283 tweets per second. The record was set again during the 2011 FIFA Women's World Cup Final between Japan and the United States, when 7,196 tweets per second were published. When American singer Michael Jackson died on June 25, 2009, Twitter servers crashed after users were updating their status to include the words "Michael Jackson" at a rate of 100,000 tweets per hour. The current record as of August 3, 2013, was set in Japan, with 143,199 tweets per second during a television screening of the movie Castle in the Sky (beating the previous record of 33,388, also set by Japan for the television screening of the same movie).

In June 2009, St. Louis Cardinals manager Tony La Russa sued Twitter for trade infringement and cybersquatting after an unknown user impersonated him and made vulgar posts. The lawsuit was settled, and Twitter introduced "Verified Accounts" later that year. Also in 2009, Ashton Kutcher's Twitter account became the first one with a million followers.

Twitter played a major role in the 2009 Iranian presidential election protests.

The first unassisted off-Earth Twitter message was posted from the International Space Station by NASA astronaut T. J. Creamer on January 22, 2010. By late November 2010, an average of a dozen updates per day were posted on the astronauts' communal account, @NASA_Astronauts. NASA has also hosted over 25 "tweetups", events that provide guests with VIP access to NASA facilities and speakers with the goal of leveraging participants' social networks to further the outreach goals of NASA.

Twitter acquired application developer Atebits on April 11, 2010. Atebits had developed the Apple Design Award-winning Twitter client Tweetie for the Mac and iPhone. The application became the official Twitter client for the iPhone, iPad and Mac.

In 2010 the Library of Congress archived all Tweets back to 2006 and began archiving all new tweets. Only the text of tweets were archived; they do not include videos, images, or linked content. They switched to archiving tweets on a selected basis similar to their treatment of other media in 2018.

== 2010–2014 ==
Logo used from 2012 to 2023

From September through October 2010, the company began rolling out "New Twitter", an entirely revamped edition of twitter.com. Changes included the ability to see pictures and videos without leaving Twitter itself by clicking on individual tweets which contain links to images and clips from a variety of supported websites, including YouTube and Flickr, and a complete overhaul of the interface, which shifted links such as '@mentions' and 'Retweets' above the Twitter stream, while 'Messages' and 'Log Out' became accessible via a black bar at the very top of twitter.com. As of November 1, 2010, the company confirmed that the "New Twitter experience" had been rolled out to all users. In 2019, Twitter was announced to be the 10th most downloaded mobile app of the decade, from 2010 to 2019.

Twitter played an important role in the Arab Spring across the Middle East and North Africa.

On April 5, 2011, Twitter tested a new homepage and phased out the "Old Twitter". However, a glitch came about after the page was launched, so the previous "retro" homepage was still in use until the issues were resolved; the new homepage was reintroduced on April 20. On December 8, 2011, Twitter overhauled its website once more to feature the "Fly" design, which the service says is easier for new users to follow and promotes advertising. In addition to the Home tab, the Connect and Discover tabs were introduced along with a redesigned profile and timeline of Tweets. The site's layout has been compared to that of Facebook. On February 21, 2012, it was announced that Twitter and Yandex agreed to a partnership. Yandex, a Russian search engine, finds value within the partnership due to Twitter's real-time news feeds. Twitter's director of business development explained that it is important to have Twitter content where Twitter users go. On March 21, 2012, Twitter celebrated its sixth birthday by announcing that it had 140 million users, a 40% rise from September 2011, who were sending 340 million tweets per day. In April 2012, Twitter announced that it was opening an office in Detroit, with the aim of working with automotive brands and advertising agencies. Twitter also expanded its office in Dublin.

In March 2011, a cobra escaped from the Bronx Zoo; soon after, a parody Twitter account for the cobra appeared using the handle "@BronxZoosCobra," which soon amassed a large number of followers. The snake was on the loose for a week before being recaptured, during which time the account tweeted regularly. This parody account led to increased interest in parody accounts on Twitter in general.

On June 5, 2012, a modified logo was unveiled through the company blog, removing the text to showcase the slightly redesigned bird as the sole symbol of Twitter. On December 18, 2012, Twitter announced monthly active users had increased 42% in the proceeding nine months and now surpassed 200 million.

In December 2012 Pope Benedict XVI joined Twitter with the account name "@pontifex." The account answers questions which are posed to it using the hashtag "askpontifex."

In 2012 "tweet" was added to the Oxford English Dictionary. Vine, a short video service, was launched in 2013.

On January 28, 2013, Twitter acquired Crashlytics in order to build out its mobile developer products. On April 18, 2013, Twitter launched a music app called Twitter Music for the iPhone. On August 28, 2013, Twitter acquired Trendrr, followed by the acquisition of MoPub on September 9, 2013. As of September 2013, the company's data showed that 200 million users sent over 400 million tweets daily, with nearly 60% of tweets sent from mobile devices.

In April 2013 the Syrian Electronic Army hacked the Twitter account of the Associated Press. The attack had a significant short-term impact on the stock market. In October they hacked the account of Barack Obama.

During Super Bowl XLVII on February 3, 2013, when the power went out in the Superdome Mondelez International, Kraft Foods vice president Lisa Mann was asked to tweet, "You can still dunk in the dark", referring to Oreo cookies. She approved, and as she told Ad Age in 2020, "literally the world [had] changed when I woke up the next morning." This became a milestone in the development of commenting daily on culture.

Twitter went public in 2013 through an initial public offering (IPO). The IPO raised US$1.8 billion.

== 2014–2020 ==
"2.5D" parallax scrolling of city buildings

2014 was a hard year for Twitter with analysts and the market both pessimistic about the company.

In April 2014, Twitter underwent a redesign that made the site resemble Facebook somewhat, with a profile picture and biography in a column left to the timeline, and a full-width header image with parallax scrolling effect. (Note: It is not documented whether the parallax scrolling effect was added with the redesign in April 2014 or subsequently.) That layout was used as the main for the desktop front end until July 2019, undergoing changes over time such as the removal of shortcut buttons to jump to the previous or next tweet in early 2017, and rounded profile pictures since June 2017. Twitter still struggled to turn a profit.

In April 2015, the Twitter.com desktop homepage changed. Later in the year it became apparent that growth had slowed.

In September 2016, Twitter shares rose 20% after a report that it had received takeover approaches. Potential buyers were Alphabet (the parent company of Google), Microsoft, Salesforce.com, Verizon, and The Walt Disney Company. Twitter's board of directors were open to a deal, which could have come by the end of 2016. However, no deal was made, with reports in October stating that all the potential buyers dropped out partly due to concerns over abuse and harassment on the service.

In 2017 Elon Musk first tweeted his interest in acquiring Twitter. In June 2017, Twitter revamped its dashboard to improve the new user experience. Vine was shut down in 2017.

On April 29, 2018, the first commercial tweet from space was sent by Solstar utilizing solely commercial infrastructure during a New Shepard flight. In May 2018, Twitter announced that tweet replies deemed by an algorithm to be detractive from the conversation would initially be hidden and only load by actuating a "Show more replies" element at the bottom.

Moderation of terrorism and violent extremism on the platform was a significant challenge with Twitter suspending more than a million accounts on terrorism grounds from 2015 to 2018.

In 2018 the tweet size limit was raised from 140 characters to 280 characters. This change was trialed in 2017.

In 2019, Twitter released another redesign of its user interface.

== 2020–2022 ==
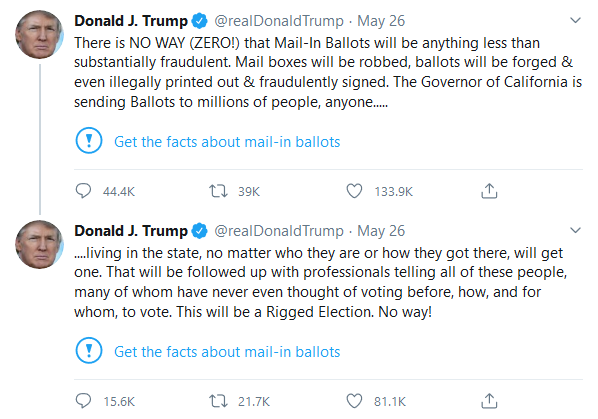
The two tweets on May 26, 2020, from President Trump that Twitter had marked "potentially misleading" (inserting the blue warning icon and "Get the facts..." language) that led to the executive order

Twitter experienced considerable growth during the COVID-19 pandemic in 2020. The platform also was increasingly used for misinformation related to the pandemic. This combination posed a significant challenge to Twitter, as a result they started marking tweets which contained misleading information, and adding links to fact-checks. Twitter was not always successful in marking and/or removing misinformation and on a number of occasions marked factual information as misinformation. COVID and Twitter also presented science communicators with a mix of challenges and opportunities.

In May 2020, Twitter moderators marked two tweets from U.S. President Donald Trump as "potentially misleading" and linked to a fact-check. Trump responded by signing an executive order to weaken Section 230 of the Communications Decency Act, which limits social media sites' liability for content moderation decisions. After the January 6 United States Capitol attack, Twitter banned Trump, claiming that he violated "the glorification of violence policy". The ban drew criticism from American conservatives and European leaders, who saw it as an interference on freedom of speech.

In 2020, Chinese foreign ministry spokesperson Zhao Lijian pushed conspiracy theories about the pandemic on Twitter, which is blocked in mainland China but is used as a public diplomacy tool by Chinese officials to promote the Chinese government and defend it from criticism. China's ambassador to South Africa also made these claims on Twitter. In May 2020, Twitter placed fact-check labels on two of the Chinese government tweets which had falsely suggested that the virus originated in the US and was brought to China by the Americans. In January 2021, Hua Chunying renewed the conspiracy theory from Zhao that the SARS-CoV-2 virus originated in the United States from the U.S. military biology laboratory Fort Detrick. Hua continued to refer to it on Twitter, while asking the government of the United States to open up Fort Detrick for further investigation to determine if it is the source of the SARS-CoV-2 virus.

In April 2021, Twitter announced that it was establishing its African headquarters in Ghana. On June 5, 2021, the Nigerian government issued an indefinite ban on Twitter usage in the country, citing "misinformation and fake news spread through it have had real world violent consequences", after the platform removed tweets made by the Nigerian President Muhammadu Buhari. Nigeria's ban was criticized by Amnesty International.

In 2021, Twitter began the research phase of Bluesky, an open source decentralized social media protocol where users can choose which algorithmic curation they want. The same year, Twitter also released Twitter Spaces, a social audio feature; "super follows", a way to subscribe to creators for exclusive content; and a beta of "ticketed Spaces", which makes access to certain audio rooms paid. Twitter unveiled a redesign in August 2021, with adjusted colors and a new Chirp font, which improves the left-alignment of most Western languages.

In June 2022, Twitter announced a partnership with e-commerce giant Shopify, and its plans to launch a sales channel app for U.S. Shopify merchants.

On August 23, 2022, the contents of a whistleblower complaint by former information security head Peiter Zatko to the United States Congress were published. Zatko had been fired by Twitter in January 2022. The complaint alleges that Twitter failed to disclose several data breaches, had negligent security measures, violated United States securities regulations, and broke the terms of a previous settlement with the Federal Trade Commission over the safeguarding of user data. The report also claims that the Indian government forced Twitter to hire one of its agents to gain direct access to user data.

== Acquisition by Elon Musk (2022–present) ==
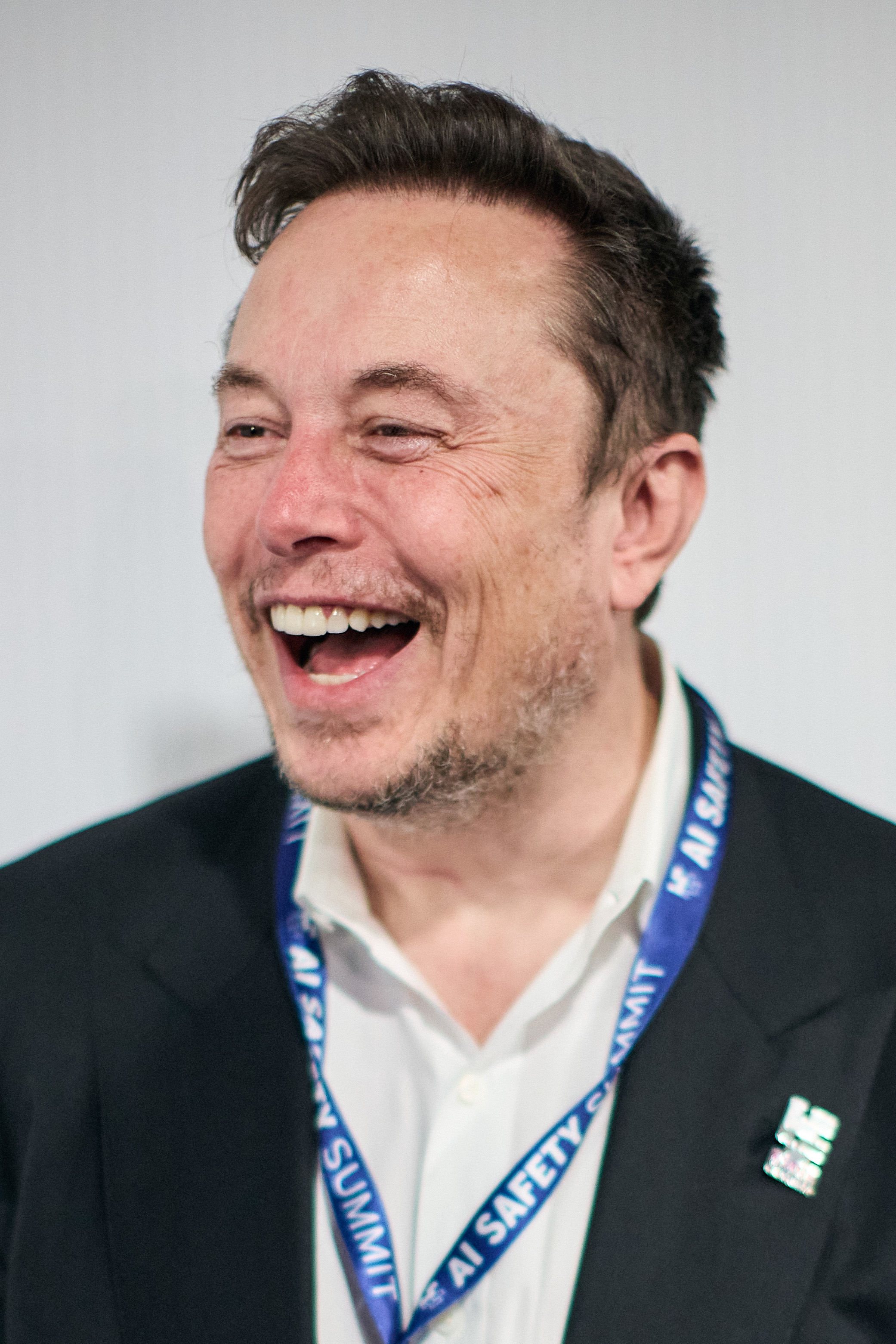
Elon Musk in 2023 at an AI Summit at Bletchley Park

Elon Musk initiated an acquisition of the American social media company Twitter, Inc. (now X Corp.) on April 14, 2022, and concluded it on October 27, 2022. Musk had begun buying shares of the company in January 2022, becoming its largest shareholder by April with a 9.1 percent ownership stake. Twitter invited Musk to join its board of directors, an offer he initially accepted before declining. On April 14, Musk made an unsolicited offer to purchase the company, to which Twitter's board responded with a "poison pill" strategy to resist a hostile takeover before unanimously accepting Musk's buyout offer of $44 billion on April 25. Musk stated that he planned to introduce new features to the platform, make its algorithms open-source, combat spambot accounts, and promote free speech, framing the acquisition as the cornerstone of X, an "everything app".

In July, Musk announced his intention to terminate the agreement, asserting that Twitter had breached their agreement by refusing to crack down on spambot accounts. The company filed a lawsuit against Musk in the Delaware Court of Chancery shortly thereafter, with a trial scheduled for the week of October 17. Weeks before the trial was set to begin, Musk reversed course, announcing that he would move forward with the acquisition. The deal closed on October 28, with Musk immediately becoming Twitter's new owner and CEO. Twitter was taken private and merged into a new parent company named X Corp. Musk promptly fired several top executives, including previous CEO Parag Agrawal. Musk has since proposed several reforms to Twitter and laid off half of the company's workforce. Hundreds of employees then resigned from the company after Musk issued an ultimatum demanding they commit to "extremely hardcore" work. Linda Yaccarino was appointed CEO of X Corp. In July 2023, the Twitter service was rebranded as X.

Reactions to the buyout were mixed, with praise for Musk's planned reforms and vision for the company, particularly his calls for greater free speech, but criticism over fears of a potential rise in misinformation and disinformation, harassment, and hate speech on the platform. Within the United States, conservatives have largely supported the acquisition, while many liberals and former Twitter employees have voiced concerns about Musk's intentions. Since becoming owner, Musk has faced backlash for his handling of the company and account suspensions, including the December 2022 suspensions of ten journalists.

=== Post-acquisition ===
Elon Musk completed an acquisition of Twitter in October 2022; Musk acted as CEO of Twitter until June 2023 when he was succeeded by Linda Yaccarino. Twitter was rebranded to X on July 23, 2023, and its domain name changed from twitter.com to x.com on May 17, 2024. Yaccarino resigned on July 9, 2025.

Now operating as X, the platform closely resembles its predecessor but includes additional features such as long-form texts, account monetization options, audio-video calls, integration with xAI's Grok chatbot, job search, and a repurposing of the platform's verification system as a subscription premium. Several legacy Twitter features were removed from the site after Musk acquired Twitter, including Circles, NFT profile pictures, and the experimental pronouns in profiles feature. Musk's aims included transforming X into a "digital town square" and an "everything app" akin to WeChat.

Twitter/X has faced significant controversy under Musk's ownership. Issues such as the release of the Twitter Files, suspension of ten journalists' accounts, and labeling media outlets as "state-affiliated" and restricting their visibility have sparked criticism. Despite Musk stepping down as CEO, the platform has continued to face criticism over issues such as viral misinformation, hate speech (especially antisemitism), and child pornography. In response to allegations it deemed unfair, X Corp. has pursued legal action against nonprofit organizations Media Matters and the Center for Countering Digital Hate.

== See also ==
- Timeline of Twitter
- History of Facebook
- History of YouTube
- 2020 Twitter account hijacking
- December 2022 Twitter suspensions
- Eoghan Harris Twitter scandal
- Saudi infiltration of Twitter
- Twitter Files
- Twitter joke trial
- Twitter, Inc. v. Taamneh
- WikiLeaks-related Twitter court orders
- Twitter Revolution
