= Emily White (businesswoman) =

American technology executive (born 1978)

- Born: August 31, 1978 (age 48); Santa Clara, California, U.S.
- Education: Vanderbilt University
- Employer: Mave
- Known for: Former COO of Snapchat

Emily C. White (born August 31, 1978) is an American technology executive and president of Anthos Capital, a private equity and venture capital firm focused on consumer-oriented companies. She is the former chief operating officer of Snapchat Inc and former director of business operations at Instagram. White was the COO of Snapchat from 2013 to 2015, when she stepped down to work on other projects. In 2016, White founded Mave, a personal concierge startup. She has been a board member of Hyperloop One, a transportation technology company.

== Career ==
White obtained her bachelor's degree at Vanderbilt University in 2000, and spent the first nine years of her career at Google Inc, then left Google in late 2010 to join Facebook. In 2013, she became the director of business operations at Instagram, which was acquired by Facebook the previous year. Her boardroom appointments have included Lululemon Athletica Inc. and the National Center for Women & Information Technology. In September 2015, Emily joined Hyperloop One as a board observer. In 2016, White created a personal concierge startup called Mave. As of March 2016, the company was only an invite-only beta.

=== Snapchat ===
White was hired by Snapchat Inc. as a business strategist and advisor. She was the COO from 2013 until March 2015. In 2014, she oversaw the rollout of Snapchat's first revenue stream, “Brand Story,” ads. A month later, Snapchat debuted a stream of posts from the American Music Awards, sponsored by Samsung. In 2015, Snapchat acquired a $200 million investment from Alibaba Group and White stepped down as COO. According to sources, the move was precipitated with the realization by co-founder and CEO Evan Spiegel that he wanted to be a more hands-on and operational CEO.
