= Timeline of Pinterest =

This is a timeline of Pinterest, an American social media service for publishing and discovery of information in the form of digital pinboards.

== Timeline ==
Year	Month and date	Event type	Details
2008	August	Company	Paul Sciarra quits his job at New York venture capital firm Radius Capital, and Ben Silbermann quits his job at Google, and the two together found Cold Brew Labs.
2009	early year	Product	Cold Brew Labs receives institutional funding from FirstMark Capital for Tote, an app in the iPhone app store that they would eventually abandon in favor of developing Pinterest.
2009	November, December	Product	Pinterest is conceptualized by co-founders Ben Silbermann, Evan Sharp, and Paul Sciarra.
2010	(date unclear, reported in some sources as January 1)	Funding	Pinterest completes an angel round of funding, with investors FirstMark Capital, Jeremy Stoppelman, Jack Abraham, Michael Birch, Scott Belsky, Shana Fisher, Kevin Hartz, Brian Cohen, Hank Vigil, Fritz Lanman, William Lohse.
2010	March	Product	The first prototype of the product is launched and made available to a small group of colleagues and family members.
2010	early year	Potential acquisition	The company's investors and co-founder Ben Silbermann try to encourage a New York-based magazine publishing company to buy Pinterest but the publisher declines to meet with the founders.
2010	May 24–26	Publicity	Pinterest participates in the TechCrunch Disrupt conference in New York City. According to a history of the company in Business Insider, the company is "nowhere near the main stage startup competition. It didn't even get the booth on its own merits; FirstMark Capital was a Disrupt sponsor, and it had to pull strings."
2010	May 31	Funding	Former IAC M&A boss Shana Fisher calls the company and says that she loved its product, and wants to invest if they would let her.
2011	March	Product	Pinterest releases an iPhone app that brings in more than the expected number of downloads.
2011	May 7	Funding	Series A: The company secures a $10 million USD Series A financing led by Jeremy Levine and Sarah Tavel of Bessemer Venture Partners. Other investors include angel investor FirstMark Capital, Jack Abraham, Kevin Hartz, and Michael Birch from the angel round. as well as super angel Ron Conway.
2011	August 16	Publicity	Time magazine lists Pinterest in its "50 Best Websites of 2011" article.
2011	October 7	Funding	Series B: After an introduction from Kevin Hartz and Jeremy Stoppelman, the company secures $27 million USD in funding from Andreessen Horowitz, which values the company at $200 million USD. Earlier investors FirstMark Capital and Bessemer Venture Partners also invest.
2012	February 20	Product, copyright	Pinterest releases a "nopin" HTML meta tag that allowed websites to opt out of allowing their content to be pinned. Soon (February 24), Flickr implements the code to allow users to opt out of allowing their photos to be pinned.
2012	March	Product, copyright	Pinterest releases a statement that it believes its use of photos and content in pins is protected by the Digital Millennium Copyright Act's safe harbor provisions.
2012	March 13	Product, publicity	Pinterest co-founder Ben Silbermann appears on stage at the South by Southwest conference, and announces that revamped profile pages and other product improvements are on their way.
2012	March 23	Product, copyright	Pinterest eliminates the policy that gives it the right to sell user content, with the change going into effect on April 6.
2012	April 6	Team	Co-founder Paul Sciarra leaves his position at Pinterest for a consulting job as entrepreneur in residence at Andreessen Horowitz.
2012	February, June	Userbase	Ann Romney, wife of 2012 US presidential election candidate Mitt Romney, starts using Pinterest in February. Michelle Obama, wife of incumbent president Barack Obama, starts using Pinterest in June.
2012	May 1	Product, copyright	Pinterest adds automatic attribution of authors on images originating from Flickr, Behance, YouTube, and Vimeo. Automatic attribution is also added for Pins from sites mirroring content on Flickr. At the same time Flickr added a Pin shortcut to its share option menu to users who have not opted out of sharing their images.
2012	May 17	Funding	Series C: Japanese electronic commerce company Rakuten announces it is leading a $100 million investment in Pinterest, alongside investors including Slow Ventures, Andreessen Horowitz, Bessemer Venture Partners, and FirstMark Capital, based on a valuation of $1.5 billion.
2012	August 10	Product, userbase	Pinterest opens to the public and no longer requires a request or an invitation to join the site.
2012	August 14	Product, userbase	Pinterest launches apps for Android and iPad.
2012	September 20	Team	Pinterest announces the hiring of its new head of engineering, Jon Jenkins. Jenkins comes from Amazon, where he spent eight years as an engineering lead and was also a director of develop tools, platform analysis and website platform.
2012	October 14	Product	Pinterest launches business accounts allowing businesses to either convert their existing personal accounts into business accounts, or start from scratch.
2012	October 17	Product	Pinterest announces a new feature that would allow users to report others for negative and offensive activity or block other users if they do not want to view their content. Pinterest said they want to keep their community "positive and respectful."
2013	January 3	Acquisitions by Pinterest	Pinterest acquires and announces plans to shut down recipe discovery site Punchfork.
2013	February 20	Funding	Series D: Pinterest raises $200 million at a $2.5 billion valuation from Bessemer Venture Partners, Andreessen Horowitz, FirstMark Capital, and Valiant Capital Partners.
2013	March 20	Acquisitions by Pinterest	Pinterest acquires mobile startup Livestar at undisclosed terms.
2013	October 11	Acquisitions by Pinterest	Pinterest acquires Hackermeter. The company's co-founders, Lucas Baker and Frost Li, join Pinterest as engineers.
2013	October 23	Funding	Series E: Pinterest receives a $225 million round of equity funding that valued the website at $3.8 billion. Investors include Fidelity Investments (new), as well as FirstMark Capital, Andreessen Horowitz, Valiant Capital Partners, Bessemer Venture Partners (from Series D).
2014	January 6	Acquisitions by Pinterest	Pinterest acquires image recognition and visual search startup VisualGraph.
2014	April 24, June 11	Product	April 24: Pinterest announces and releases Guided Search for its mobile apps, a new visual way to explore Pinterest's more than 30 billion pins—links or images chosen by users and assigned by them to topical collections. June 11: Guided Search is released on the web version of the site.
2014	May 12	Product (advertising)	Pinterest launches "Promoted Pins" that would allow companies to sponsor results in its search results and category feeds.
2014	May 15	Funding	Series F: Pinterest receives $200 million in funding at a $5 billion valuation. Investors include SV Angel (a new investor, though partner Ron Conway had personally invested in Pinterest earlier) as well as Series E investors Valiant Capital Partners, FirstMark Capital, Fidelity Investments, Bessemer Venture Partners, and Andreessen Horowitz.
2014	July 30	Acquisitions by Pinterest	Pinterest acquires Icebergs, described as a "Pinterest for creatives" by TechCrunch.
2014	August 6	Product	Pinterest adds a direct messaging feature that allows users to discuss pins privately.
2014	August 26	Product	Pinterest launches a new analytics dashboard for business users.
2014	October 6	Product	Pinterest releases "Pin Picks" that are weekly curations of their own content.
2014	December 28	Product (advertising)	Pinterest opens up promoted pins to all advertisers, following what they perceive as success of their beta program.
2015	January 23	Product	Pinterest debuts new search filters that give users more control over the pins they see. Commentators believe the aim of these is to go after the male demographic, which tends to be put off by the female-heavy pins on the site.
2015	January 27	Product (advertising)	Pinterest announces that it will begin showing Promoted Pins in users' home feeds, thereby expanding the reach of Promoted Pins considerably.
2015	February 11	Product, partnerships	Pinterest announces a partnership with Apple Inc. whereby people using Pinterest's iOS app on iPhones or iPads can directly download iOS apps from within Pinterest itself, using special types of pins called app Pins.
2015	March 16, May 8	Funding	Series G: Pinterest raises a total of $553 million at a $11 billion valuation, and allows employees to sell part of their vested stock in secondary markets. It is initially reported (as of March 16) that the company has raised $367 million. On May 8, the raising of an additional $186 million is announced.
2015	April 2	Product	Pinterest debuts a new "Pin It" button that requires fewer steps to bookmark a Pin, and that, according to tests, increases the number of pinning actions by 3%. The new button is developed by the team from Icebergs, a company acquired by Pinterest the previous year.
2015	April 3	Acquisitions by Pinterest	Pinterest acquires Hike Labs, a two-person startup developing a mobile publishing application called Drafty, in order to gain the technology expertise of the two people. One of the people, Jason Shellen, was a founding team member at Blogger and Google Reader as well as a co-founder at Thing Labs.
2015	April 27	Product	Pinterest announces the launch of Marketing Developer Partners (MDP), its program to help marketers use Pinterest more effectively, by helping them schedule pins and incorporate performance feedback to post better pins.
2015	May 4	Product, platform	Pinterest launches the beta version of its developer platform, that allows developers to use data about Pinterest users who connect their accounts to external applications. Interested developers can sign up to have their names added to a white list that will be given this access.
2015	May 18	Product, advertising	Pinterest introduces a new video ad format called Cinematic Pins, where the video plays only either while the user is scrolling or if the user taps on the pin. This is in contrast with existing autoplay videos used by Facebook and other companies for their feeds.
2015	June 2	Product	Pinterest announces the launch of Buyable Pins, a special type of pin that can be used to make purchases within Pinterest itself. When users select a Buyable Pin, they have the option of choosing the item they wish to buy (for instance, choosing between different dress sizes and colors), and they can then make the purchase within the app using a variety of payment methods, including Apple Pay. Launch partners include Shopify and Demandware. The buyable pins are free to use, and Pinterest does not take a cut of the purchases made. However, Pinterest intends to allow sellers to promote buyable pins just as they can promote other pins.
2015	June 30	Product	Pinterest begins rolling out Buyable Pins on iPhone and iPad.
2015	July 8	Product, platform	Pinterest rolls out the first integrations on its developer platform (first announced on May 4). These include integrations from IFTTT and Polyvore.
2015	October 5	Product	Pinterest announces the expansion of Buyable Pins to new partners in addition to its original partner list of Shopify and Demandware. The new partners include Bigcommerce, Magento, and IBM Commerce. Pinterest also notes that there are now 60 million Buyable Pins on the site.
2015	November 8	Product	Pinterest begins rolling out a visual search tool that allows users to select part of an image and find similar Pins.
2015	December	Product	Pinterest launches a new way for users to monitor price drops on buyable pins. "When users save pins, they'll get a heads up when a price drops in the form of an in-app notification and an email. They can then jump straight to that pin and make the purchase."
2016	June 15	Acquisition	Fleksy announces that it was purchased by Pinterest. Half of the team moved to Pinterest's product engineering team. The Fleksy application itself was open sourced.
2016	July	Acquisition	Pinterest acquires Math Camp, the team that built Highlight, Roll, and Shorts. Most of the Math Camp team would join Pinterest. Math Camp's products are not part of the deal, so these would shut down and the source code is planned to be open sourced.
2016	August	Product	Pinterest launches a video player that lets users and brands upload and store clips of any length straight to the site. It also begins implementing visual search tools on videos.
2016	August 9	Company	Pinterest announces that it would open its first engineering office outside the Bay Area in Seattle. The office would temporarily be located in the WeWork building in downtown Seattle.
2016	August 17	Product (advertising)	Pinterest launches video advertising to a limited number of partners. The feature is known as "Promoted Video Pins", and allows advertisers to place video ads.
2016	August 23	Acquisition	Pinterest announces that it would be acquiring the team behind Instapaper, which will continue operating as a separate app. The Instapaper team will both work on the core Pinterest experience and updating Instapaper.
2016	October 13	Userbase	Pinterest reaches 150 million monthly users. Leaked documents from late 2015 showed that Pinterest had been targeting 151 million users by the end of 2015, making this milestone behind schedule.
2016	November 10	Product	Pinterest begins showing a "Tried it" checkmark on Pins, which allows users to share the products, recipes, and ideas they have tried.
2017	February 1	Product (advertising)	Pinterest begins rolling out search advertising for a limited group of partners. These marketers will be able to run search ad campaigns through their Kenshoo dashboards.
2017	February 7	Product	Pinterest simultaneously launches three products related to visual search: (1) Lens, which allows users to take photos of objects to find Pins related those objects; (2) Instant Ideas, a circle button that appears on each Pin that, when tapped, displays related Pins; and (3) Shop the Look, a circle button that appears on each individual item within a photo that, when tapped, displays Pins related to that item.
2017	April 20	Product	Removal of their dedicated post "liking" feature as it seemed redundant to "boards", which are user collections of posts. Users' existing indexes of liked posts were converted into a collection ("board") named as such.

== See also ==
- Timeline of social media
