= Self-hosting (network) =

Practice of running a website using a private web server

Self-hosting is the practice of running a website or service on either a home server or a server fully under the user's control, as opposed to using a service managed by someone else. Self-hosting allows users to have more control over their data, privacy, and computing infrastructure, as well as potentially saving costs and improving skills.

== History ==
The practice of self-hosting web services became more feasible with the development of cloud computing and virtualization technologies, which enabled users to run their own servers on remote hardware or virtual machines. The first public cloud service, Amazon Web Services (AWS), was launched in 2006, offering Simple Storage Service (S3) and Elastic Compute Cloud (EC2) as its initial products.

Self-hosting web services became more popular with the rise of free and open-source software projects, which provide alternatives to various web-based services and applications, such as file storage, password management, media streaming, home automation, and more. There is also a sizeable hobbyist community around self-hosting, made up of hobbyists, technology professionals and privacy-conscious individuals.

== Benefits ==
Self-hosting software often allows a user greater customization over their software experience compared to solutions in the cloud. For example, Jellyfin has many add-ons allowing for new types of program information, interfaces, subtitles and other features that are not available on commercial streaming services. A self-hosted RSS reader can help a user control their own source of news, rather than be reliant on a corporation's algorithm to deliver their news. This degree of control can make self-hosted software more resistant to enshittification.

Self-hosted services are usually more privacy-respecting because the user is hosting the data on hardware under their control, meaning that a for-profit company will not be able to leverage that data to generate revenue from targeted ads or similar strategies. The fact that the data does not leave the premises where it is stored also means the user may be less susceptible to mass surveillance, such as by hosting personal photographs on Immich to avoid those personal data being accessible to Google on Google Photos.

While some self-hosted software solutions offer subscriptions to support their development, many are distributed via open-source repositories. This can allow a user to save money over the long term, such as by using Nextcloud to avoid subscriptions for cloud storage which often increase over time.

== Downsides ==
While self-hosting can save money in some aspects, it also involves costs, such as for the computing hardware itself, but also the electricity costs, which some advanced users have noted can be unexpectedly high. If users access their self-hosted services on a domain they own, there is usually a cost involved in registering the domain.

Performance can be faster on local hardware due to the lower latency, but it can sometimes be slower on self-hosted hardware, particularly if attempting to host on under-powered devices such as single-board computers like Raspberry Pi, which can struggle to run intensive processes involved in speech-to-text algorithms, video encoding and similar applications.

Security must be considered when self-hosting software exposed to the public internet. Making resources on a home network remotely accessible usually involves port forwarding, setting up encryption methods like HTTPS, and other networking approaches which if not configured correctly, could become an attack surface for hackers and thieves. It is also recommended to back up any self-hosted data to a second location, potentially offsite, to ensure all data isn't lost in case of a fire, flood or other disaster that could destroy hardware in a home.

Self-hosting software often has a steeper learning curve than competing software because of the need to learn about computer networking, security, and software configuration on environments such as Linux and the command line. This can require more time investment than paid alternatives.

== Examples ==
Software class	Non-selfhosted examples	Self-hosted alternatives
Cloud storage	Google Drive, OneDrive, Dropbox	Nextcloud, ownCloud, Seafile
Social networking	Facebook, Instagram, Twitter, Reddit	Mastodon, Pleroma, Friendica, Pixelfed, Lemmy
Video platforms	YouTube, Vimeo, Dailymotion	PeerTube
Password managers	1Password, LastPass, NordPass	Bitwarden, PassBolt, KeePassXC
Home automation	Apple Home, Google Home	Home Assistant, OpenHAB
Bookmarks	Pinboard, del.icio.us	Linkwarden, Readeck
Read it later	Pocket, Instapaper	Wallabag, Readeck
Messaging	WhatsApp, Discord, Viber, Telegram	XMPP, IRC, Matrix, Mattermost, Rocket.Chat, Zulip
Office suite	Google Docs, Microsoft Office Online	Nextcloud Office (Collabora Online), OnlyOffice
Note-taking	Evernote, Google Keep	Joplin, Standard Notes, Notesnook
Photos	Google Photos, iCloud Photos	Immich, PhotoPrism
Calendar	Google Calendar	Nextcloud Calendar, Radicale
News aggregator	Google News, Feedly, Inoreader	Nextcloud News, FreshRSS, Tiny Tiny RSS, Miniflux
Media server	Spotify, Netflix	Jellyfin, Plex, Emby, Navidrome, Subsonic
Audiobook streaming	Audible	Audiobookshelf
Forge	GitHub, SourceForge	GitLab FOSS, Gitea, Forgejo

== See also ==
- Cloud computing
- Decentralized web
- Dedicated hosting service
- On-premises software
- Web hosting service
