= Webstock =

Web technology conference in Wellington, New Zealand

- Genre: Web
- Frequency: Annual
- Venue: St. James Theatre, Wellington
- Location: Wellington
- Country: New Zealand
- Inaugurated: 2006
- Most recent: 2017
- Attendance: ~800
- Website: http://www.webstock.org.nz/

Webstock is a web technology conference held in Wellington, New Zealand featuring a range of high-profile speakers covering a variety of web-related topics such as accessibility, usability, ethnographic design and development practices.

Webstock began in 2005 and was created by a small non-profit group (consisting of Mike Brown, Natasha Lampard (formerly Hall), Debbie Sidelinger and Ben Lampard).

== Webstock 2006 ==
Speakers at the first four-day Webstock in 2006 included Dori Smith, Roger Hudson, Russ Weakley, Rachel McAlpine, Douglas Bowman, Heather Hesketh, Russell Brown (PublicAddress), Tony Chor (Microsoft), Darren Fittler, Kelly Goto, Ben Goodger (Firefox / Google), Rowan Simpson (Trade Me), Donna Maurer, Joel Spolsky, Kathy Sierra, Andreas Girardet (creator of Yoper) and Steve Champeon.

== Webstock 2008 ==
The second Webstock ran from 10–15 February 2008, with speakers including Shawn Henry (W3C), Simon Willison (Django), Scott Berkun, Amy Hoy, Peter Morville, Nat Torkington, Dan Cederholm, Kelly Goto, Michael Lopp, Cal Henderson, Jill Whalen, Russell Brown, Jason Santa Maria, Rachel McAlpine, Sam Morgan (Trade Me), Tom Coates (Yahoo!), Liz Danzico, Damian Conway (Perl), Luke Wroblewski and Kathy Sierra.

== Webstock 2009 ==
The third Webstock ran from 16–20 February 2009, featuring: Jane McGonigal, Nat Torkington, Derek Powazek, Meg Pickard (Guardian Unlimited, Matt Jones and Matt Biddulph of Dopplr, Fiona Romeo, David Recordon (key contributor to OpenID and then Open Platforms Tech Lead for Six Apart), Cameron Adams, Pamela Fox, Adrian Holovaty, Heather Champ (Flickr), Michael Lopp. Ze Frank, Russell Brown, Derek Featherstone, Annalee Newitz, Joshua Porter, Toby Segaran, Jasmina Tesanovic, Russ Weakley, Ben Goodger, Tom Coates (Yahoo!), Bruce Sterling, and Damian Conway.

== Webstock 2010 ==
The fourth Webstock ran from 15–19 February 2010, featuring: Jeff Atwood, Shelley Bernstein, Daniel Burka, Ben Cerveny, Sebastian Chan, Mike Davidson, Regine DeBatty, Esther Derby, Brian Fling, Thomas Fuchs, Adam Greenfield, Lachlan Hardy, Lisa Herrod, Bek Hodgson, Amy Hoy, Mark Pesce, John Resig, Eric Ries, Rives (poet), Kevin Rose, Toby Segaran, Chris Shiflett, Scott Thomas and Jeffrey Veen.

== Webstock 2011 ==
The fifth Webstock ran from 14–18 February 2011.

=== Day 1 (Thursday 17 February) ===
Speakers:

- Frank Chimero - The Digital Campfire
- Michael Koziarski - That's all well and good, but how does it help me?
- Christine Perfetti - Adventurous Usability Techniques: Novel Approaches for the Seasoned Pro
- David Recordon - HTML5 at Facebook
- Mark Pilgrim - The Future of the Web: where are we going and why am I in this handbasket?
- Jason Webley - Portrait of an Artist as an Independent Musician
- Nicole Sullivan - CSS Tools for Massive Websites
- Jason Santa Maria - On Web Typography
- Steve Souders - Web Performance Optimisation: The Gift that Keeps on Giving
- Kristina Halvorson - Content/Communication
- John Gruber - The Gap Theory of UI Design
- Doug Bowman - Delivering Delight
- Amanda Palmer talks new music paradigm, blogging, Twitter and life

=== Day 2 (Friday 18 February) ===
Speakers:

- Marco Arment - Contrary to popular beliefs
- David McCandless - Information is Beautiful
- Glenda Sims - Practical Accessibility Testing
- Josh Clark - Buttons Are a Hack: The New Rules of Designing for Touch
- Jason Cohen - A Geek Sifts Through the Bullshit
- Peter Sunde - The Pirate Bay of Penzance
- Michael Lopp - An Engineering Mindset
- Tom Coates - Everything the Network Touches
- Scott McCloud - Comics: A Medium in Transition
- Merlin Mann - Mime The Gap

== Webstock 2012 ==
The sixth Webstock ran from 13–17 February 2012 and was attended by over 800 delegates.

=== Day 1 (Thursday 16 February) ===
Speakers:

- Kathy Sierra - MBU: Building the Minimum Badass User
- Jeremy Keith - Of Time and the Network
- danah boyd - Culture of Fear + Attention Economy = ?!?!
- Dana Chisnell - Deconstructing Delight: Pleasure, Flow, and Meaning
- Estelle Weyl - Mobile: Don't Break the Web
- Erin Kissane - Little Big Systems
- Ethan Marcotte - The Responsive Web Designer
- Nick Mihailovski - Acting on data
- Jennifer Brook - Within Reach: Publishing for the iPad
- Matt Haughey - Lessons from a 40-year-old
- Lauren Beukes - Kinking Reality
- Amy Hoy - Change the game
- Matthew Inman - How to get a buttcrapload of people to read what you write

=== Day 2 (Friday 17 February) ===
Speakers:

- Jared Spool - The Anatomy of a Design Decision
- Gabriella Coleman - In Lulz We Trust
- Scott Hanselman - It's not what you read, it's what you ignore
- Wilson Miner - When we build
- Raffi Krikorian - 3 things that turn out to matter (listed as "Pressure, defense, and responses")
- Rob Malda - Slashdot — the rise and fall
- Jessica Hische - Typography through song: an historical and epistemological journey
- Adam Lisagor - Lonely Pan Flute
- Michael B Johnson Making Movies is Harder than it Looks: Building Tools for Telling Stories
- Jenn Lim and Tony Hsieh - Delivering Happiness
- Derek Handley - Doing Good and Well

== Webstock 2017 ==
Webstock 2017 ran from 13 to 17 February 2017, with masterclasses on the first two days and the conference proper on the last two days. Scheduled speakers were Lindsay Aitchison; Genevieve Bell; Jonathon Colman; Anil Dash; Katie Dill; Janine Gianfredi; Kim Goodwin; Jeff Gothelf; Cal Henderson; Lara Hogan; Indy Johar; Sacha Judd; Tim Kadlec; Darius Kazemi; Patricia Moore; Ashley Nelson-Hornstein; Stefan Sagmeister; Jared Spool; Lisa Welchman; and Marcin Wichary.

== Webstock Mini ==
In between the major conferences, the group runs one day and evening events regularly throughout the year, featuring both New Zealand and International speakers.
