= 2014 Webby Awards =

US internet awards ceremony

The 18th annual Webby Awards for 2014 was held at Cipriani Wall Street in New York City on May 19, 2014, which was hosted by comedian and actor Patton Oswalt. The awards ceremony was streamed live at the Webby Awards website.

Lifetime Achievement was awarded to Lawrence Lessig for his work with intellectual property be co-founding Creative Commons and the person of the year was the artist Banksy.

== Nominees and winners ==
(from )

Category	Webby Award winner	People's Voice winner	Other nominees
Mobile & Apps – Best Practices	NY Times for iPhone	BBC News	The New Yorker; Colorsnap Glass; MailChimp
Mobile & Apps – Best Travel Guides/Ratings/Reviews	Jetpac City Guides	Fandango Mobile	
Mobile & Apps – Best Use of Device Camera	Glasses.com	Glasses.com	Seene; KeyMe; ColorSnap Glass; Cyberchase
Mobile & Apps – Best Use of GPS	Glympse	Glympse	Pin Drop; Hailo; Play the Road
Mobile & Apps – Best Use of Mobile Video	Vine	Vine	Magisto; NBA.com mobile Spark Camera; TouchCast
Mobile & Apps – Best User Experience	Netflix	Pocket	Mailbox; Coast; Google Hangouts
Mobile & Apps – Best Visual Design (Aesthetic)	Dots	Yahoo! Weather	Wide Sky; Artsy; Type : Rider
Mobile & Apps – Best Visual Design (Function)	Urbanears	CloudMagic	Path; The New York Times; Guggenheim Museum App
Mobile & Apps – City/Urban Innovation	Points	Citi Bike	PulsePoint; Shade Cinema; Run That Town
Mobile & Apps – Connected Products	Use Me Leave Me	A Computer Anyone Can Make	Points; SmartThings; Adidas MiCoach
Mobile & Apps – Games (Handheld)	Dots	QuizUp	Dumb Ways to Die; LIMBO; Badland
Mobile & Apps – Games (Tablet & All Other Devices)	Badland	Plants vs. Zombies 2	Type:Rider; Robot Unicorn Attack; Wonderputt
Web – Activism	Change.org	Change.org	Endthebacklog.org; Offshore; Causes.com; Sexgerms.com
Web – Art	Artsy	The Creators Project	Curiator; Illusion; Wondereur.com
Web – Associates	Downtown Brooklyn Partnership	Internet Association	Wireless is Limitless; Spotlight on Broadway; Designing Our Future
Web – Best Home Page	Sagmeister & Walsh	Squarespace	Vogue.es; The Serengeti Lion
Web – Best Navigation	Behance	The Last Hunt	Diplomatic-cover; Nautilus; W
Web – Best Practices	NSA Files: Decoded	Google Play	PBS Video; Flash Vs. HTML; NPR Responsive Design
Web – Best Use of Animation or Motion Graphics	The Art of Noise	The Art of Noise	KLM – Space; Heart of the Arctic; Life Size Messi
Web – Best Use of Photography	Graffiti General	Found	We Are Still Marching; Wondereur.com
Web – Best Visual Design – Aesthetic	Squarespace	Nature Valley Trail View 2.0	Medium; Nautilus; Names for Change
Web – Food and Drink	Max Brenner	Max Brenner	
Web – Games	Hellorun	Atari Arcade	BBC Travel's Geoguessr; Ba Ba Dum; Superbrawl 3
Web – Science	Nautilus	Wired Science	How to Put a Human on Mars; Space Center Houston; The Institute for Molecular Engineering
Web – Real Estate	Zillow	Zillow	The Agency; Foxtons; Start Fresh. Buy New; RentHop
Advertising & Media – Augmented Reality	Kringl	KFC WOW@25	OpenPool; GIFwrap; Voices Against Violence
Advertising & Media – Banner Campaigns	GTI Bannerbahn	Coca-Cola Share Your Voice	Effies – Results Don't Lie; Missing Person Pre-Roll; Classicals Behind The Classics
Advertising & Media – Best Use of Online Media	Photoshop Action	Photoshop Action	The Smart Phone Line; Telekinize The Rainbow; Classicals Behind The Classics; The Greatest Action Movie Ever
Advertising & Media – Best Use of Social Media	Google+ Same Sex Marriage	Google+ Same Sex Marriage	Milk Carton 2.0; Nike PHOTOiD; NATALIA PROJECT; The Alzheimer's Event
Advertising & Media – Branded Content	LIVE TEST SERIES	Real Beauty Sketches	Virgin America Safety Video #VXsafetydance; Telekinetic Coffee Shop Surprise; The Scarecrow
Advertising & Media – Digital Campaigns	Sound of Honda / Ayrton Senna 1989	Lay's Do Us A Flavor	KLM – Space; Burberry Kisses: A Google Art, Copy & Code Project; GTI Bannerbahn
Best Actress	Taylor Schilling		
Webby Person of the Year	Banksy		
Webby Artist of the Year	De La Soul		
Webby Breakout of the Year	Kickstarter		
Webby Film & Video Person of the Year	Freddie Wong		
Webby Athlete of the Year	Jamaican Bobsled Team		
Webby Agency of the Year	Ogilvy Paris		
Webby Lifetime Achievement	Lawrence Lessig		
