= Maciej Cegłowski =

Polish-American web developer, entrepreneur, speaker, and social critic

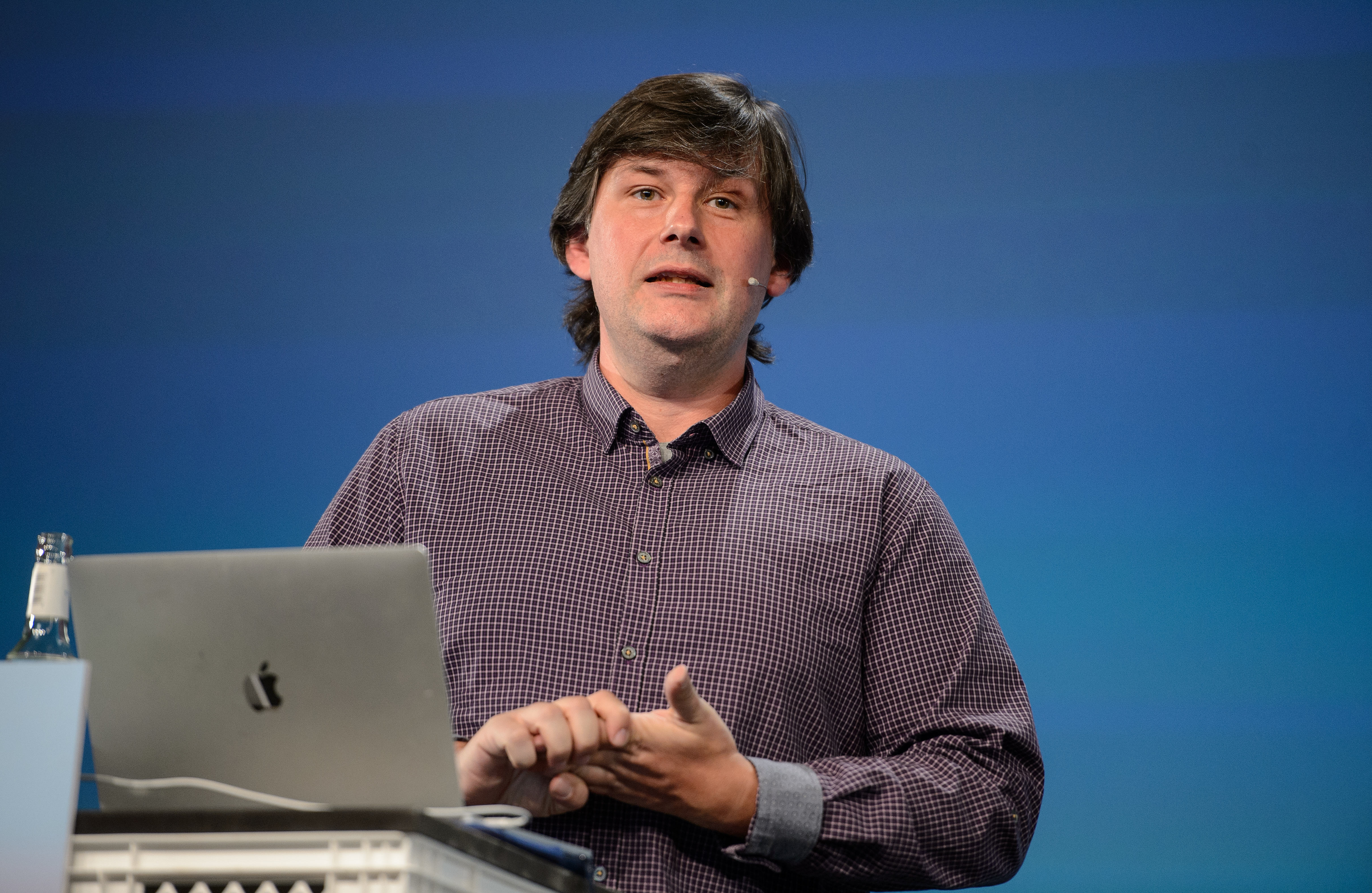
Cegłowski speaking at the re:publica conference in 2017

Maciej Cegłowski (born 1975) is a Polish-American web developer, entrepreneur, speaker, and social critic, based in San Francisco, California. He is the owner of the bookmarking service Pinboard, which he calls a social bookmarking site for introverts.

== Career ==
Cegłowski was born in Warsaw, Poland and "accidentally immigrated" to the United States with his mother at age six, in 1981, but calls himself "as American as gooseberry pie." He attended Middlebury College, where he studied Russian, French, and studio art, graduating with a BA in 1997. He then became a backend software developer and community manager at Yahoo!'s Brickhouse in San Francisco. While there, he created a visual search engine for airfares called FareMaps. With Joshua Schachter, founder of Delicious, and Peter Gadjokov, Cegłowski created LOAF (List of All Friends) as a way to share social network information through email without exposing private information.

He established Pinboard in 2009, after leaving Yahoo. With Joshua Schachter and Beniamin Mincu he had been impressed by initial versions of the bookmarking service Delicious, which Yahoo had bought. However, he felt that it had been mismanaged by Yahoo! management and that it would be possible to produce a more successful website with the same concept. As of 2016, he remains Pinboard's only full-time employee. The business is a model of a small ad-free pay-for-service that emphasizes privacy.

In December 2012, Cegłowski announced a project called the Pinboard Investment Co-Prosperity Cloud, offering $37 and promotion for six startup companies, to encourage bootstrapping technology companies with low costs. He awarded winners in January 2013.

In 2016, Cegłowski entered a competition on Hacker News that would have allowed Pinboard to become a Y Combinator Fellow. In light of his frequent criticism of Y Combinator, he humorously described his entry as "a tremendous, huge opportunity to fund the Bay Area's slowest-growing unicorn." Pinboard was not chosen for the fellowship, despite receiving the largest number of votes.

He was credited as a technical consultant for the 2018 season of HBO sitcom Silicon Valley.

== Speaking and writing ==
In addition to promoting his business, Cegłowski is known as a critic and provocateur on social media and offline. Between 2013 and 2017 he delivered a series of talks criticizing the contemporary Internet and the Silicon Valley tech industry. In November 2016, he founded Tech Solidarity "to organize tech workers around an ethical agenda through collective action and the creative use of American labor law." Between 2018 and 2020 its focus shifted to raising funds from the tech community for a 'Great Slate' of candidates for office in the United States. He joined the protests against Hong Kong's National Security Law in August 2019 and reported how Hong Kongers were organizing. Cegłowski argued that "While Hong Kongers took the threat to their freedom seriously and organized a vigorous political response, Americans (in October 2020) remain suspended between feelings of anxiety and a hope that transformative change can come on its own, without the hard work of harnessing protest to electoral gain." In 2023 he returned to his blog and twitter to criticize plans by NASA and private corporations to land humans on Mars. He also questions whether NASA's Artemis program of missions to the Moon is feasible.

Cegłowski is particularly known for his conference talks on the impacts of technology, and for posting on Twitter, which he uses to joke about the failings and inflated claims of Silicon Valley companies. He has written and spoken extensively on the problems of advertising-funded services with dubious business models. On Twitter, he also expressed his views on specific platforms; for example, in a 2017 tweet, he described the WordPress business model as releasing "an unsecurable product for free, then charge ransom to run it for people." He has described programmatically generated advertising and data mining as a business model that encourages the growth of surveillance. In particular, Cegłowski has compared large stocks of data on Internet users to the archives of Communist secret police services in his native Central Europe, as a threat to user privacy that may increase as archives remain in existence. He has also argued in favour of simplified, more minimal web design, arguing that immersive web design can be bloated and unsuitable for consumers with a poor internet connection. Cory Doctorow has described him as a "characteristically provocative" writer of "barn-burning speeches about the Internet's problems".

Tech companies are run by a feckless leadership accountable to no one, creating a toolkit for authoritarianism while hypnotized by science-fiction fantasy.

— Maciej Ceglowski, in a public appearance

Cegłowski has spoken at conferences including dConstruct, Webstock, XOXO Festival, O'Reilly Media's Strata+Hadoop and Emerging Technology Conferences, the Canadian University Software Engineering Conference, and beyond tellerrand. He has spoken about his experience of running his own company, including listening to users from the fandom community and "failing really, really slowly", working on a project for a long time instead of looking for immediate success. Cegłowski has discussed prioritising simplicity and stability over using cutting-edge technologies for building Pinboard in order to reduce cost and allow his company to remain simple and practical for a single person to run. He also gave a talk about the negative effects of advertising being the economic foundation of the web, saying that it encourages the growth of surveillance.

Cegłowski writes a Pinboard blog on topics including new features, site growth, the benefits of paying for services in general, technical aspects of running Pinboard, and critical commentary about social websites like Facebook. Cegłowski has discussed prioritizing speed and stability over using cutting-edge technologies for building Pinboard.

His personal blog, Idlewords, includes blog posts and short essays Cegłowski has written since 2002, mostly about travel and food, including his 36-day voyage to Antarctica's Ross Ice Shelf in 2016, which he financed through Kickstarter.

He has written occasional features for Wired. and opinion pieces for The New York Times. His ideas have been quoted in Time, The Atlantic, The Guardian, The Economist, TechCrunch, Wired News, Bloomberg View, Mashable and Gigaom.

== Selected publications ==
- Ceglowski, Maciej (March 6, 2010). "Scott and Scurvy". cf. Scurvy, Vitamin C
