= Overcast (app) =

Podcast app

- The main screen of Overcast
- Original author: Marco Arment
- Developers: Overcast Radio, LLC (Marco Arment)
- Release: July 2014; 12 years ago
- Stable release: 2026.8 / 11 August 2026; 3 days ago
- Platform: iOS; iPadOS; watchOS; CarPlay; MacOS; VisionOS; Web
- Size: 14.7 MB
- Available in: English
- Type: Podcast player
- License: Proprietary
- Website: overcast.fm

Overcast is a podcast app for iOS that was launched in 2014 by Marco Arment.

== Development and features ==
Arment was the Chief Technology Officer of Tumblr and founder of Instapaper before creating Overcast. He had created his own podcasts before launching the app. In March 2023, Arment told The Vergecast how he built and maintains Overcast by himself, and that he uses ad banners promoting podcasts to cover the costs of the free app.

In April 2019, Overcast introduced a feature that allowed users to share clips from podcasts to social media. In January 2020, Overcast was updated to allow users to skip the intros and outros of podcasts.

== Reception ==
In 2014, Overcast received positive reviews from MacWorld and iMore. In 2015, The Verge and The Sweet Setup each named it the best podcast app for iOS that year. In 2017, Discover Pods gave an endorsement citing the "smart speed" feature, which shortens quiet gaps in a podcast.
