= Passwork =

Spanish password manager

- Original authors: Ilya Garakh; Andrey Pyankov
- Developer: Passwork Europe SL
- Release: June 2014; 12 years ago
- Stable release: 7.6 / April 2026; 6 months ago
- Operating system: Cross-platform
- Platform: Web application, self-hosted
- Available in: Multilingual
- Type: Password manager
- License: Proprietary
- Website: passwork.pro

Passwork is a password manager and secrets management application for businesses, available as self-hosted software and as a cloud service. It is published by Passwork Europe SL, a company based in Barcelona, Spain.

== History ==
Passwork origins goes back to 2014 when Ilya Garakh and Andrey Pyankov registered the domain passwork.ru in Arkhangelsk.

In May 2017, Passwork Oy was registered in Finland at an office building on Pasilankatu in the Pasila district of Helsinki, where a Viljakainen family company also operated. Garakh and Pyankov each held 35 percent of the Finnish company, with the remaining 30 percent held by Pekka Viljakainen's family investment firm, Aii Corporation Oy. Through Passwork Oy, its software was used by the University of Zurich, the Dresden University of Technology, and several Irish state agencies.

Following the Russian invasion of Ukraine, Garakh and Pyankov sold their shares in Passwork Oy to Viljakainen family, and later it was wound up in 2024. In July 2022, a new company, Passwork FZ-LLC, was registered in the United Arab Emirates. In August 2024, Passwork Europe SL was founded in Barcelona and acquired the software to serve in the EU and the United States.

== Software ==
Passwork is a self-hosted password management software, which provides centralised storage and sharing of credentials through encrypted vaults, with folders, role-based access control, audit logs and activity tracking. It supports LDAP and Active Directory integration, single sign-on, browser extensions and mobile applications, and offers programmatic access through an API, a command-line interface and a Python connector. The product uses a client-side, "zero-knowledge" design, in which data is encrypted and decrypted on the customer's own systems rather than on the vendor's servers. Version 7, released in 2025, introduced a rewritten codebase and expanded the software's secrets-management features. The software's links to a Russian version have raised security concerns.

== Use ==
Passwork has been used by several Irish state bodies, including the Competition and Consumer Protection Commission, the Office of Public Works and the State Laboratory. Some of the users are based in the Netherlands.
