= Self-hosting =

Self-hosting may refer to:

- Self-hosting (compilers), a computer program that produces new versions of that same program
- Self-hosting (network), the practice of running and maintaining a website using a private web server

== See also ==
- Self-booting disk
