= Google Discover =

Personalised content feed by Google

- Developer: Google
- Release: July 2017 (as Google Feed)
- Operating system: Android, iOS, web
- Type: News aggregator
- Website: www.google.com/search/about

Google Discover is a personalised content feed operated by Google. It presents users with articles, videos and other material selected algorithmically from their interests and search history, rather than from accounts they have chosen to follow. The feed appears in the Google app on Android and iOS and beneath the search box on the mobile Google Search homepage.

Introduced in July 2017 as Google Feed and renamed Discover in September 2018, the service has become a significant source of referral traffic for news publishers, in some cases exceeding Google Search. It has also drawn criticism for surfacing AI-generated misinformation and, from 2025, for replacing publishers' headlines with AI-written summaries.

== History ==
=== Google Feed ===
Google introduced a personalised feed in the Google app in July 2017, replacing the card-based Google Now service. The feed drew on a user's searches and on trending topics, and added a "Follow" button allowing users to subscribe to subjects such as sports teams, films and bands. Google said at launch that "the more you use Google, the better your feed will be". Contemporary coverage noted that Google Now had been free of advertising and questioned how the feed would eventually be monetised.

=== Rebranding as Discover ===
On 24 September 2018, as part of announcements marking Google's twentieth anniversary, the company renamed the feed Discover and extended it to the mobile web homepage, placing it directly below the search box. Google said at the time that the service was used by 800 million people each month.

The rebrand added topic headers, controls allowing users to request more or less material on a subject, and a wider mix of content including video and older "evergreen" articles. Google said content would be matched to a user's level of familiarity with a topic using its Knowledge Graph.

=== Later developments ===
At the Search Central Live event in Madrid in April 2025, Google demonstrated a desktop version of Discover intended for the Google homepage, combining recommended articles with information such as weather and stock prices. In September 2025 the company began adding the ability to follow individual sites and creators within the feed.

== Use by publishers ==
Discover has become a major referral channel for news organisations. An analysis of 700 United States news sites by the analytics firm Chartbeat, reported in September 2024, found that traffic from Discover had risen 13 per cent since January 2023, while referrals from social media fell from 6 to 4 per cent of the total and traffic from Facebook dropped by more than 40 per cent. At The Hill, Discover had come to send more traffic than Google Search.

Publishers have described the feed as difficult to plan for. Anne Look Thiam of the BBC called it "increasingly a very viable space for news coverage, including breaking news", but said the broadcaster did not actively target it because of its unpredictability; Brad Streicher of Chartbeat said Discover and Search were "very distinct referral sources" requiring different approaches.

In France, Reporters Without Borders reported that Discover had become the country's leading source of traffic to media outlets, generating more than 500 million clicks a month during 2024.

== Criticism ==
=== AI-generated content ===
In July 2025, Reporters Without Borders said Discover was promoting websites publishing AI-generated false content at the expense of established media. It cited the French outlet Next, which identified more than 4,000 AI-generated news sites, and gave examples including a site that had placed 844 articles in Discover before publishing a false report that the clothing chain Promod was closing, and another blocked by a Paris court in May 2025 for plagiarising 40 French outlets. The organisation called on Google to tighten Discover's eligibility criteria and to adopt standards such as the Journalism Trust Initiative. Google responded that its anti-spam systems "combat mass-produced low-quality content" and that its results were "99% spam-free".

=== AI-written headlines ===
From late 2025 Google began replacing publishers' headlines in Discover with summaries generated by AI. PC Gamer reported in December 2025 that a story headlined "'Child labor is unbeatable': Baldur's Gate 3 players discover how to build an army of unkillable kids" had been rendered as "BG3 players exploit children", and that an Ars Technica article stating that Valve's Steam Machine should not be expected to carry console pricing appeared as "Steam Machine price revealed". The magazine noted that Google's own publisher guidelines prohibit headlines of that kind. Google described the change as "testing a new design that changes the placement of existing headlines to make topic details easier to digest".

Nieman Lab reported in January 2026 that Google had described the practice in December 2025 as "a small UI experiment for a subset of Discover users" before reframing it as a feature that "performs well for user satisfaction". It found that the generated headlines sometimes conveyed the opposite of what an article reported, and that the feed carried no clear indication of when text had been written by AI.

== See also ==
- Google Search profiles
- Google News
