= Clipping (publications) =

Cutting out articles from a publication

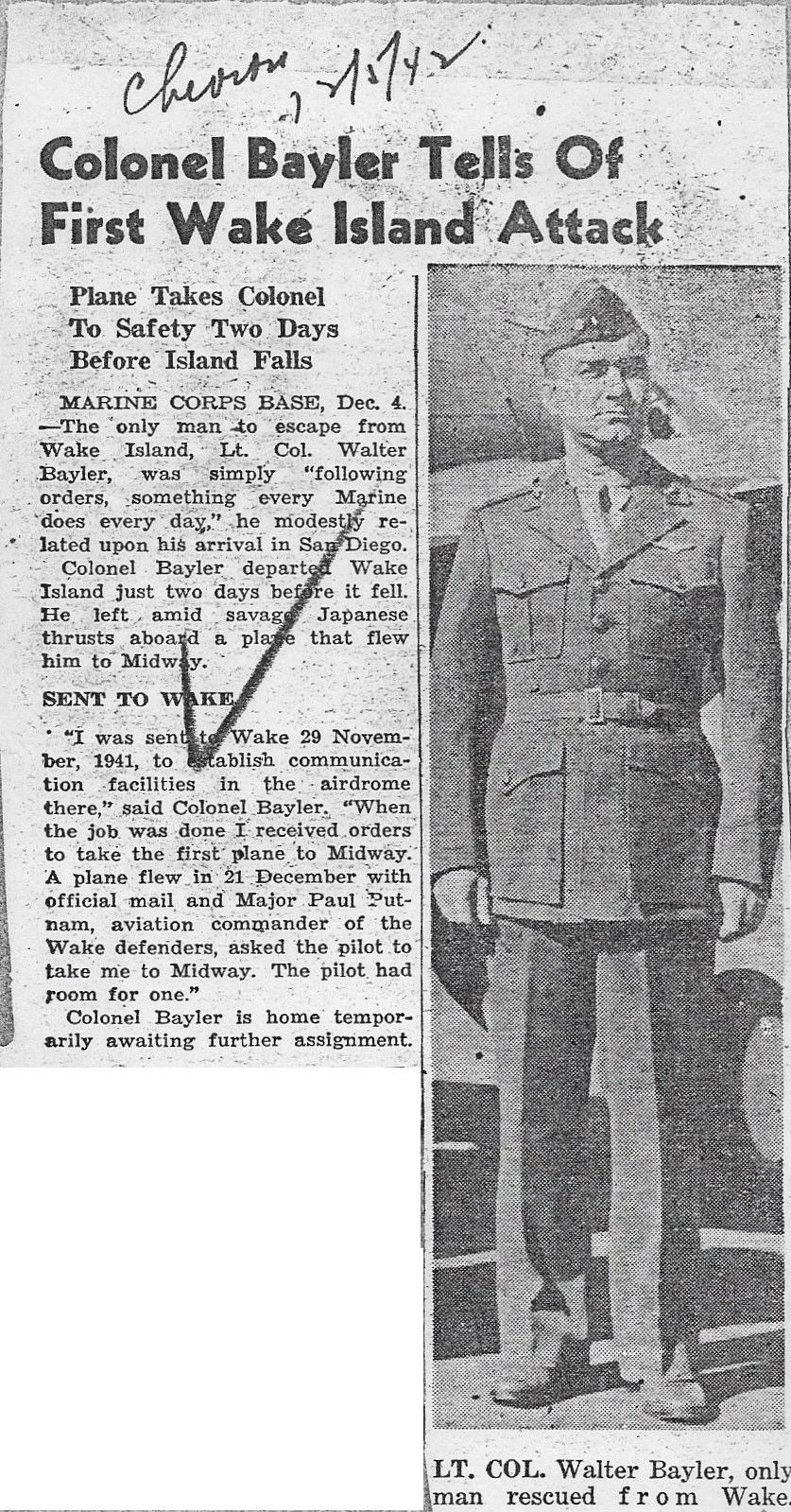
A clipping of an American newspaper article describing how a person escaped before the Battle of Wake Island in 1941

Clipping is the practice of cutting out articles from a paper publication, such as a newspaper or a magazine. Clippings are commonly used for personal reference, archiving, or preservation of noteworthy events.

== Uses ==
Newspaper clippings are frequently employed by students to write reports or make presentations on current events for school. Clippings may also be retained by adults for future reference, historical research, or sentimental reasons, such as preserving an article on a significant event, such as the Moon landing or a major sporting event.

Media monitoring services, which track the media exposure of a client, often include the collection of clippings in their offerings. These clippings may be used to gauge the effectiveness of public relations campaigns, track publicity efforts, or monitor the overall media landscape for mentions of a company, individual, or specific topic.

== Collage ==
Clippings are not only functional but can also serve artistic purposes, particularly in collage art. Artists like Pablo Picasso utilized clippings in their works to create layered and textured pieces. Picasso's "Glass and Bottle of Suze" is a notable example of this technique, where newspaper clippings are combined with other materials to form a cohesive artistic expression.

== Digital Clippings ==
With the advent of digital media, the concept of clipping has expanded into the digital realm. Digital clippings involve capturing and saving sections of online articles or electronic publications. Tools like Evernote, Pocket, and other web clipping services allow users to save and organize digital clippings for later use.

== See also ==
- Media monitoring service
- Collage
- Scrapbooking
- Digital curation
