= Readability (service) =

Service for cleaning up web pages for reading

The Readability logo

Readability was an Internet-based "read it later" service launched in 2009 by Arc90. It ceased its 'bookmarklet' service on September 10, 2016, and discontinued its API service on December 10, 2016. It was similar to competitors Instapaper and Pocket in that it allowed the user to save an article from the web and read it later without the clutter of the original website. It started originally as a bookmarklet to remove clutter from webpages and reformat the main article text in a readable font and layout, but following the popularity of the bookmarklet, it evolved to become a service with an app.

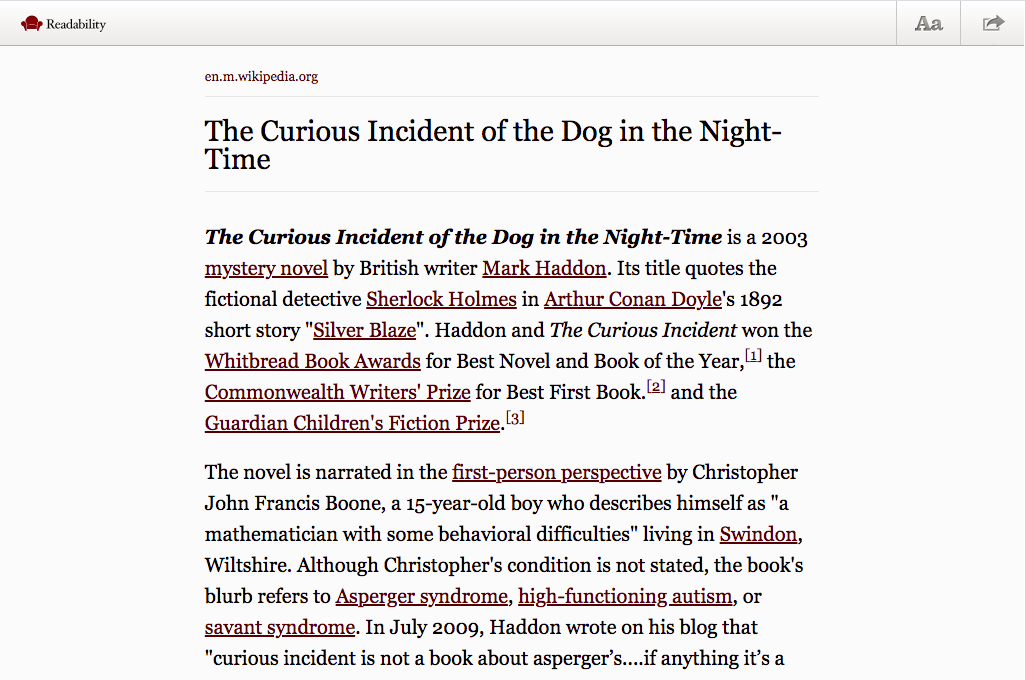
An example of a cleaned up page, the Wikipedia article "The Curious Incident of the Dog in the Night-Time"

One distinguishing aspect of Readability was that it attempted to set up a subscription model where users of the service paid a monthly fee, a large portion of which would go to the publishers of the content they read in the Readability service. This business model faced two major hurdles: criticism by publishers and issues with Apple's iOS App Store pricing model. In 2011, Readability got a large amount of publicity after Apple rejected their app from the iOS App Store as it used a third-party payment system that circumvented Apple's 30% cut for in-app subscription payments. Readability argued that Apple's taking of a 30% share from their subscription revenues would cut into the money they were giving to publishers.

Money that was collected for publishers who did not sign up to Readability's publisher program would be kept by Readability themselves. This led John Gruber, author of the popular Daring Fireball technology blog, to describe Readability in 2012 as "scumbags" as well as raising extended discussion among bloggers and journalists as to the ethics of Readability's business model. Gruber later clarified that his primary issue was that Readability told its users that it would distribute 70% of its subscription fee to publishers, when in fact it was only distributing a portion of that 70% to the publishers who had registered, which he described as "misleading at best, and arguably dishonest". Following the controversy, Readability's subscription model was discontinued.

All services were terminated on December 10, 2016, per an announcement on the company's website.
