= Readeck =

Read-it-later web-application

- Stable release: 0.22
- Written in: Go, JavaScript
- Operating system: Cross-platform
- Platform: x86-64, ARM
- Available in: multiple languages
- License: GNU Affero General Public License, version 3.0
- Website: readeck.org
- Repository: codeberg.org/readeck/readeck

Readeck is a free server application for saving links to read later ("read-it later"). It allows for the management and reading of articles away from their original sites, in a standardised page layout with stripped-back content. Articles can be organised by tags, marked as favourites, archived, and also followed via RSS feed and OPDS. Exporting to e-book format is also possible. It is compatible with existing services such as Pocket, Readability, Instapaper, and Wallabag.

The project is implemented as source code in the Go language, as well as in binary files for major server platforms (Linux, macOS, FreeBSD, Windows, ARM, x86). The main interface for the application is the browser. Mobile apps are also available for Android and iOS/iPadOS.
