= Google Search profiles =

Google Search feature for publishers and creators

Search profiles
- Developer: Google
- Release: 4 June 2026
- Operating system: Web, Google app
- Website: profile.google.com

Search profiles are a feature of Google Search that gives publishers and creators a single page collecting their articles, videos and social media posts. Google launched the feature in the United States on 4 June 2026, and documents it as part of its Google for Creators programme.

A Search profile can display a header image, an avatar and biography, links to the owner's website and social accounts, a follow button, and their recent content from platforms including YouTube, Facebook, Instagram, TikTok and X. Profiles are reached from a creator's knowledge panel, by tapping a name in Google Discover on the Google app's home screen, or through a direct URL.

== Eligibility ==
At launch, Google required publishers and creators to have what it called "a sizable following on at least one major social or video platform", set at 300,000 followers on TikTok or 100,000 on YouTube, Instagram or X.

Google reduced the threshold twice in the following months. In August 2026 it was lowered to 35,000 followers on YouTube, Instagram and X, and 100,000 on TikTok; Robby Stein, a Google vice-president, said the change was intended to "allow more creators and publishers to set up Search profiles". As of September 2026, the threshold was 10,000 followers on any one of YouTube, Instagram, X or TikTok.

The same update added support for multiple profiles under a single login, aimed at media companies running several brands, which had previously needed a separate Google Account for each profile. Article listings were also changed to allow longer headlines and larger image thumbnails.

Profiles may be generated automatically for those who already have a knowledge panel; others can claim one through Google's claim page.

== Availability ==
The feature was announced for the United States only, with Google saying it planned to expand it to other countries and add further capabilities. Profiles were subsequently reported in Brazil, Italy, Portugal, Spain and France ahead of any formal announcement.

== Reception ==
Trade coverage framed Search profiles as a way for publishers to consolidate their presence across Google's surfaces at a time when referral traffic from search was under pressure. Writing for Search Engine Journal, Roger Montti argued that the profile badges were a response to artificial intelligence-driven search sending less traffic to publishers, describing the feature as a "break the glass measure". In September 2026 Google introduced badges that publishers can place on their own websites to direct readers to their Search profile.
