= Spoiler (media) =

Information on crucial plot elements

A spoiler is an element of a disseminated summary or description of a media narrative that reveals significant plot elements, with the implication that the experience of discovering the plot naturally, as the creator intended it, has been robbed ("spoiled") of its full effect. Typically, the conclusion of a plot, including the climax and ending, is regarded as highly susceptible to spoilers. Plot twists are also prone to spoilers. Any narrative medium can produce spoilers, although they are usually associated with movies and television shows. Some people attempt to avoid being "spoiled" while others seek out spoilers to learn as much as possible about a narrative before experiencing it. Spoilers have become more common in the present day with the rise of social media, which provides an outlet for people to spread spoilers.

There are three types of spoilers: short spoilers, long spoilers, and thematic spoilers. Short spoilers reveal the plot ending in a very brief and less detailed manner, without any summary or explanation of themes in the story, typically spanning one to three sentences. Long spoilers usually provide more context and range between two and five sentences. They provide a summary and reveal the ending of a story. Lastly, thematic spoilers reveal a story's unifying theme as well as providing a synopsis of the plot and revealing the ending. They range from three to six sentences in length. Many studies conclude that all types of spoilers reduce enjoyment.

== History ==
The first print use of the term spoiler with its modern meaning was in the April 1971 issue of National Lampoon, in which the article "Spoilers," by Doug Kenney, revealed the endings of famous films and novels. Kenney wrote, "Spoilers! What are they? Simply the trick ending to every mystery novel and movie you're ever liable to see. Saves time and money!"

The term first appeared on the Internet in 1979 before becoming common in Usenet newsgroups by the late 1980s. According to the rules of netiquette, spoilers should be preceded by a warning of some kind. Sometimes, these warnings are omitted, accidentally or deliberately, resulting in unwitting readers having literature, films, television programs, and other works that they were looking forward to experiencing spoiled.

== Website policies and features ==
Wikipedia includes spoilers in its articles without giving advance warning. Mathew Prichard criticized Wikipedia for presenting spoilers for his grandmother's play The Mousetrap. Andrew Jarecki argued that Wikipedia should have spoiler alerts; the ending of Catfish, a documentary he had produced, was posted on Wikipedia before its theatrical release because the film was shown at the 2010 Sundance Film Festival. Jay Walsh, a Wikimedia Foundation spokesperson, said that Wikipedia is meant to be an exhaustive knowledge source and thus must contain spoilers.

Certain websites employ spoiler formatting, allowing certain details to be hidden inline with text, which the user may reveal by mousing over, highlighting or clicking the text. Websites that make use of Markdown formatting, such as Discord and Reddit, have allowed for syntax extensions such as ||spoiler|| or >!spoiler!<; websites which use a rich-text editor allow for inline formatting in this style.

On Usenet, the common method for obscuring spoiler information is to precede it with many blank lines known as 'spoiler space' – traditionally enough to push the information in question on to the next screen of a 25-line terminal. A simple cipher called ROT13 is also used in newsgroups to obscure spoilers, but is rarely used for this purpose elsewhere.

Most discussion websites provide a means of tagging certain threads as containing spoilers for those who wish to discuss a fictional work in depth, including the outcomes of events and the handling of the narrative resolution. Social media platforms such as Twitter and Tumblr allow posts to be given hashtags, allowing users to avoid certain spoiler discussions by making use of a blacklist. Due to the ad-lib methodology of tagging, however, this is imperfect and open to false positives and false negatives.

Some have felt compelled to avoid participating on public websites altogether, set up "closed" websites to exclude those who are sensitive about spoilers, or decided they had to unilaterally blog at the expense of public exchange.

== Psychological effect ==
=== Positive effects ===
In 2011, Nicholas Christenfeld and Jonathan Leavitt of UC San Diego did a psychological experiment testing whether spoilers diminish enjoyment of fiction. They gave subjects short stories with twist endings to read, giving some of the subjects information about the twist in advance. For nearly every story, subjects who had the story "spoiled" enjoyed the story more than the subjects who did not know the ending in advance.

The spoiling of James Holzhauer's loss on Jeopardy!, which was reported upon by both print and Internet sources hours before it aired on most of the show's stations, had a somewhat unexpectedly positive impact on that episode's ratings. Instead of ruining the outcome, the spoilers had teased just enough to encourage viewers to tune in to see how the previously dominant Holzhauer was beaten. Jeopardy! does not contractually require its audience members to remain silent in regard to spoilers; members have generally followed the honor system in not leaking spoilers before episodes air.

Although many avoid spoilers to prevent the possibility of decreased enjoyment, research does suggest that spoilers can increase enjoyment for viewers under certain criteria. One is mood management, in which spoilers can function as "non cognitive desensitization strategy and a cognitive coping strategy." Instead of spoilers inducing positive feelings, those who engage with spoilers may do so as a protective measure. They can insulate viewers from negative feelings by giving a sense of preparedness or time for viewers to process such information before they actually view it. Those who report that spoilers have increased enjoyment for them while engaging in media typically either actively seek this information as a division to ease anxiety or happen across a favorable spoiler.

Those who enjoy spoilers, or feel that spoilers increase their enjoyment while viewing, entail different criteria of focus and for assessment. Another criterion in assessing how spoilers may enhance enjoyment for viewers is curiosity. Viewers may feel anxiety-ridden or impatient in the face of cliffhangers or potential plot twists, in which case seeing spoilers were ways to overcome these "gaps" in viewership.

In light of media conglomeration, spoilers are becoming harder to avoid for viewers. In this way, viewers who state they embrace spoilers find enjoyment, find normalcy in spoilers, and now focus on the aesthetic elements rather than the overall plot. Knowing the end of a TV show, book, movie, etc., is perceived by viewers who embrace spoilers as only a marginal component for their enjoyment. Viewers may know the ending, but not the process in which the ways things occur or how they specifically happen.

=== Negative effects ===
Many feel spoilers irrevocably diminish suspense, speculation, shock value, and the unique experience of organically discovering a narrative. The unpredictable journey is damaged if outcomes are known ahead of time.

Similar to Christenfeld and Leavitt, in 2015, Benjamin Johnson and Judith Rosenbaum conducted an experiment to examine the impact of spoiler reveals on enjoyment. However, instead of short spoilers, the subjects were presented with long spoilers. To assess the enjoyment, Johnson and Rosenbaum employed a multi-item measure, utilizing a 12-item enjoyment questionnaire, in contrast to Christenfeld's and Leavitt's use of a single-item measure of enjoyment. Their research revealed that, when exposed to long spoilers, more subjects reported findings of the stories to be less enjoyable due to their revealing nature. When confronted with a spoiler, it reduces one's ability to individually process and hinders their critical thinking skills about a given story. Therefore, spoilers may then diminish the motivation necessary to experience a work at all if the resolution has been revealed.

Additionally, research conducted by Dr. Kevin Autry, Dr. William H. Levine and Michelle Betzer in 2016 found that enjoyment was reduced when spoilers were introduced, particularly within short stories. Their experiment had differed from Christenfeld and Leavitt's in that it featured even shorter spoilers and focused mainly on the story's end and its twist.

Similarly, an experiment conducted by Susanna Oad, in 2016, found that spoilers, whether they were short, long or thematic, reduced subjects' perceived enjoyment, suspense and fun scores. Additionally, short and long spoilers decreased subjects' perceived movingness and lasting impression scores, while thematic spoilers increased those variables.

== Reactions ==
=== Writers and directors ===
The end credits to Henri-Georges Clouzot's 1955 film Les Diaboliques includes a card with an early anti-spoiler message from the director:

Ne soyez pas DIABOLIQUES!
Ne détruisez pas l'intérêt que pourraient prendre vos amis à ce film.
Ne leur racontez pas ce que vous avez vu.
Merci pour eux.

Translation:

Don't be DIABOLICAL!
Do not destroy the interest that your friends may have in this movie.
Do not tell them what you have seen.
Thank you, on their behalf.

Similarly, Alfred Hitchcock asked audiences not to reveal the ending of his 1960 thriller Psycho, saying "Please don't give away the ending, it's the only one we have."

In an interview about his Dark Tower series (appearing in issue #4 of the 2007 Marvel Comic adaptation The Gunslinger Born), Stephen King was asked if there are spoilers in the first few novels that would ruin someone's experience of the comic. "There are no spoilers!", King replied, "You might as well say 'I'm never gonna watch Wizard of Oz again because I know how it comes out'". Later, in 2014, King was widely criticized for revelling in a major character's demise in HBO's Game of Thrones on Twitter, only moments after the episode's airing, thus revealing a plot twist for non-live and offshore audiences. King responded by commenting the end of Shakespeare's Romeo and Juliet, and the death of the eponymous protagonists.

In April 2015, the Under the Gun Theater created Swarm of Spoilers, a parody show based on George R.R. Martin's Game of Thrones series. The comedic play recapped the previous four seasons of the HBO television show. Kevin Mullaney, who directed Swarm of Spoilers, stated: "I'm somebody who's very sensitive about spoilers, so I wanted to make sure it was very clear from the title," though he went on to say, "There's actually this theory about spoilers that we think that they hurt the enjoyment of shows, and I definitely feel that way sometimes, but I think there's been studies that show the other side: that when we know the ending of a story that we haven't read before, it actually enhances the story, so I don't know if it would actually hurt anyone to come see it [Swarm of Spoilers]." The final production included 45 of the series' characters, and was played by an 18-person ensemble.

=== Film studios ===
Some producers actively plant bogus information in order to misdirect fans. The director of the film Terminator Salvation orchestrated a "disinformation campaign" where false spoilers were distributed about the film, to mask any true rumors about its plot.

The market campaigns for Marvel Studios' Avengers: Infinity War and its sequel Avengers: Endgame extensively promoted the maintenance of secrecy regarding the films' plots, with the latter's social media campaign including a hashtag (#DontSpoilTheEndgame), a signed letter from the Russo brothers and a video featuring the film's ensemble cast demanding that earlier viewers of the film refrain from spoiling the plot.

=== Film critics ===
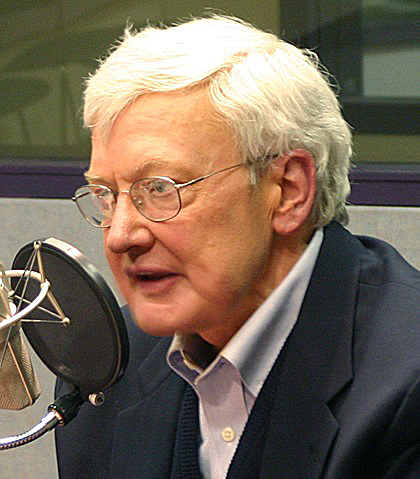
Roger Ebert in 2006

In 2005, the Chicago Sun-Times film critic Roger Ebert wrote an article entitled "Critics have no right to play spoiler" which contained spoilers and spoiler warnings. Ebert wrote:

"The characters in movies do not always do what we would do. Sometimes they make choices that offend us. That is their right. It is our right to disagree with them. It is not our right, however, to destroy for others the experience of being as surprised by those choices as we were. A few years ago, I began to notice "spoiler warnings" on Web-based movie reviews -- a shorthand way of informing the reader that a key plot point was about to be revealed. Having heard from more than a few readers accusing me of telling too much of the story, I began using such warnings in my reviews."

Ebert used two spoiler warnings in the article, saying "If you have not yet seen Million Dollar Baby and know nothing about the plot, read no further" and later said, "Now yet another spoiler warning, because I am going to become more explicit." Ebert discussed six films in the article and mentioned how many critics handled The Crying Game and noted a detail about the film The Year of Living Dangerously. Ebert also mentioned two films alongside Million Dollar Baby.

Ebert additionally criticized two commentators, Rush Limbaugh and Michael Medved (the latter of whom had "for a long time been a political commentator, not a movie critic"), for deliberately revealing the ending of the movie due to a moral disagreement with the lead character's life decision. "[S]hould no movie be allowed to consider [the moral issue]?" Ebert asked. "The separation of church and state in America was wisely designed to prevent religions from dictating the personal choices of those who do not share the same beliefs."

=== Artists ===
In an art exhibition at the Museo de Arte Contemporáneo de Monterrey (Mexico), artist Mario García Torres presented a series of works titled Ruining Paintings, in which spoilers of various films were written on large color canvases.

== See also ==
- Film criticism
- Film trailer
- Teaser trailer
- Broadcast delay
- In medias res
- Spoiler Shield
