= Two Dots (video game) =

Puzzle game for Android and IOS

- Two Dots gameplay. In this screenshot, the player forms a green-colored rectangle to remove the rest of the corresponding, green-colored dots.
- Developers: Playdots, Inc. Zynga (2022-present)
- Publishers: Playdots, Inc., Tencent Games
- Platforms: iOS; Android
- Release: iOS: May 29, 2014; Android: November 12, 2014
- Genre: Puzzle
- Mode: Single-player

Two Dots is a puzzle video game for iOS and Android, developed and published by American indie studio Playdots, Inc. The Windows 10 Mobile and Microsoft Windows versions are no longer supported. It is the sequel to Dots. It was released for iOS platforms on May 29, 2014, and became available for Android on November 12, 2014.

== Gameplay ==
Unlike Dots, Two Dots has power-ups, objectives and a campaign (series of levels), while lacking online multi-player capability. At the start of the game, only level one is unlocked; each subsequent level is unlocked only when the previous level is beaten. Levels are grouped into "worlds"; the first ten levels make up the first world, while subsequent worlds contain 25 or more levels. Worlds differ in gameplay elements, obstacles and objectives. In the earliest levels of the game, objectives include sinking anchors and breaking ice; the objective is to accomplish a target number of each, for example to sink a specified number of anchors. As each world is completed, the first and second player receives a postcard for that world.

The game previously featured a weekly "Treasure Hunt" mode, where players could compete worldwide to be the first to complete a sequence of seven levels.

A new world is added with each major game update, currently on a release schedule of roughly once every two weeks. As of November 17, 2026, there are 8,980 levels.

At the start of each level, the objectives are displayed; furthermore, the player must complete them within a specified number of moves. At the start of a level, a set of dots is "dropped" from the top of the in-game area. The player must connect at least two dots of the same color in order to make a move. They can be connected horizontally or vertically, but never diagonally. The connected dots are removed from the game area; dots directly above those will then drop down until they hit other dots or the floor beneath.

When a player connects a grouping of at least four same-colored dots to form a complete circuit, all the dots in the game area with that same color will disappear, and any dot(s) fully inside the circuit will become "bomb(s)" which will explode in all eight directions once those dots drop down.

Alternatively, when a player connects thirteen or more dots, regardless of forming a complete circuit, all the dots in the game area with that same color will disappear.

If there are no two adjacent same color dots to connect, the dots are automatically scrambled so that the player can make a valid move, similar to other games.

Items such as shufflers, erasers, targets, and color boosters are available to assist the player in completing a level. They are similar to items in the original Dots and are available by watching an advertisement or making an in-app purchase.

== Reception ==
Reception

Aggregate scores
Aggregator	Score
GameRankings	78.57%
Metacritic	79 out of 100

Two Dots received fairly positive reviews from critics on GameRankings and Metacritic. While it was praised for its simple design and a variety of obstacles and level layouts, it was also criticized for its slow life-regenerating system. The player begins with five lives, and it takes 20 minutes for a single life to regenerate, with up to a total of one hour and forty minutes required to regenerate the maximum of five lives. It was also pointed out that some levels are nearly impossible to beat, draining a player's lives quickly and prompting the player to make in-app purchases of extra lives or booster packs.

Two Dots was given the people's voice for best game on handheld devices for the 2015 Webby Awards. At the 2018 Webby Awards, it was nominated for "Best Visual Design", while it won the People's Voice Award for "Puzzle".

== Developer ==
The game was developed by Playdots, known for games Dots, and Dots & Co. In August 2020, Playdots reached an agreement to be acquired by publisher Take-Two Interactive under Zynga. As part of it, Take-Two agreed to pay $192 million for the deal, $90 million in cash and the remaining $102 million in stock. Take-Two shut down the studio in 2022, handing development to a studio within Zynga.
