= Spoiler Shield =

Defunct spoiler blocking application

- Original authors: Josh Solt, Matthew Loew
- Developer: Picking Carrots LLC
- Initial release: iPhone and iPad September, 2013
- Operating system: iOS & Android
- License: Proprietary
- Website: SpoilerShield.com iPhone & iPad Download

Spoiler Shield was an iOS and Android app designed to block spoilers of popular television shows and sports games on Facebook and Twitter. Using a proprietary algorithm, Spoiler Shield filtered the user's Facebook and/or Twitter feeds avoiding any post that could potentially give away the outcome of a show or game. It was able to block spoilers from over 30 television shows (including American Horror Story, Boardwalk Empire, and Project Runway), as well as sports games from every team of the NFL, MLB and NBA. Spoiler Shield was founded by Josh Solt and Matthew Loew in 2013.

== See also ==
- Tweetbot
