= Jared Spool =

Jared M. Spool
- Born: December 8, 1960 (age 65)
- Occupations: Writer, researcher, speaker, founder
- Years active: 1978-present
- Employer: User Interface Engineering
- Known for: User Interface Engineering (UIE), User Interface Conference, Brainsparks, Spoolcast

Jared Spool (born December 8, 1960) is an American writer, researcher, speaker, educator, and an expert on the subjects of usability, software, design, and research. He is the founding principal of User Interface Engineering (UIE), a research, training, and consulting firm that specializes in website and product usability. He is also an amateur magician. Spool attended Niskayuna High School in Niskayuna, NY.

Spool has been working in the field of usability and design since 1978, before the term usability was ever associated with computers.

== Achievements and awards ==
Under Spool's leadership, in 1996 UIE launched the User Interface Conference, an annual user experience research and design conference, which he chairs and delivers the keynotes for.

From 1998 until 2008, as an adjunct faculty member at Tufts University, Spool created and taught a unique curriculum for the Experience Design Management course at the Tufts Gordon Institute.

Spool has delivered the keynote presentations for The National Association of Government Webmasters, The National Association of Online Librarians, Higher Ed Webmasters, Agile 2009, South by Southwest Interactive, Web Advertising, Web Visions, the Usability Professionals Association, CHI (conference), the Information Architecture Summit, UX Australia, UX Lisbon, UX London, Drupal Con 2011, An Event Apart, Designing for People Amsterdam, UPA China, the Norwegian Computer Society, the British Computer Society, the Society for Technical Communication, and the Federal Webmasters Society.

In 2011, the Stevens Award was given to Spool, "whose quiet evangelism of usability and the practical outcomes of methods and tools had a wide-ranging influence on how we think about making systems effective."

== Current activities ==
Spool spends time working with research teams, consults with organizations so they can better understand how to solve their design problems, and works with reporters and industry analysts on the state of design. In addition to being a speaker at more than 20 conferences every year, Spool presents almost weekly for various groups.

Jared teaches advanced UX courses and online programs at Center Centre, and hosts weekly live webinars in a free UX community called The Leaders of Awesomeness. You can also view his talks on YouTube.

Jared continues to advocate for UX as a practice and is quoted as saying, “The number one responsibility of UX leaders is to make their organization the world's foremost experts on their users and what their users need.”

Spool also sits on the editorial board for Rosenfeld Media, a user experience publishing house.

== The Center Centre ==
With the help of a successful Kickstarter campaign, in 2014, Jared co-founded the Center Centre, "a new, bricks-and-mortar user experience design school for adults," with Dr. Leslie Jensen-Inman.

== Bibliography ==
Books

- Spool, Jared M. & Robert Hoekman, Jr. Web Anatomy: Interaction Design Frameworks that Work (ISBN 0-3216-3502-7).
- Spool, Jared M., Rosalee J. Wolfe & Daniel M. McCracken. User-Centered Web Site Development: A Human-Computer Interaction Approach (ISBN 0-1304-1161-2).
- Spool, Jared M., Carolyn Snyder, Tara Scanlon & Terri DeAngelo. Web Site Usability: A Designer's Guide (ISBN 0-6139-1572-0).
- Jeffrey Rubin & Dana Chisnell, Spool, Jared M. (Forward), Handbook of Usability Testing: How to Plan, Design, and Conduct Effective Tests (ISBN 0470185481).

Articles

- 1993. "User involvement in the design process: why, when & how?" INTERCHI 1993: 251-254
- 1994. "ProductUsability: survival techniques." CHI Conference Companion 1994: 365-366
- 1994. "Using a game to teach a design process." CHI Conference Companion 1994: 117-118
- 1995. "CHI 95 Conference Companion" 1995: 395-396
- 1995. "User Interface Engineering: fostering creative product development." CHI 95 Conference Companion 1995: 166-167
- 1997. "Product Usability: Survival Techniques." CHI Extended Abstracts 1997: 154-155
- 1997. "Measuring Website Usability." CHI Extended Abstracts 1997: 125
- 2002. "Usability in practice: alternatives to formative evaluations-evolution and revolution." CHI Extended Abstracts 2002: 891-897
- 2002. "Usability in practice: formative usability evaluations - evolution and revolution." CHI Extended Abstracts 2002: 885-890
- 2003. " Evaluating globally: how to conduct international or intercultural usability research." CHI Extended Abstracts 2003: 704-705
- 2003. "The "magic number 5": is it enough for web testing?" CHI Extended Abstracts 2003: 698-699
- 2005. "The great debate: can usability scale up?" CHI Extended Abstracts 2005: 1174-1175
- 2007. "Get real!": what's wrong with hci prototyping and how can we fix it? CHI Extended Abstracts 2007: 1913-1916
