= Piictu =

Defunct photo-sharing mobile app (2011–2013)

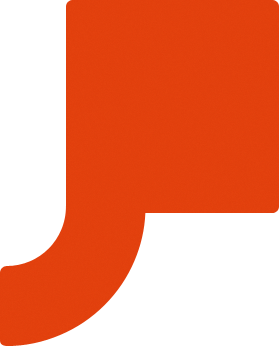
- Original author: Jonathan Slimak
- Developers: Piictu, Inc.
- Release: July 2, 2011; 15 years ago
- Operating system: iOS 3.1.2 or later
- Available in: English, Spanish, German
- Type: File sharing
- License: Freeware
- Website: piictu.com

Piictu was a photo-sharing mobile app company founded in 2011 by Jonathan Slimak, based in New York City.

== History ==
PiiCTU was launched in 2011 and encouraged users to have conversations using pictures, instead of solely posting photos. Users responded to each other with pictures, creating visual stories.

PiiCTU merged with Betaworks and ceased operations on May 31, 2013.
