= Socialflow =

Social media optimization platform

SocialFlow, Inc.
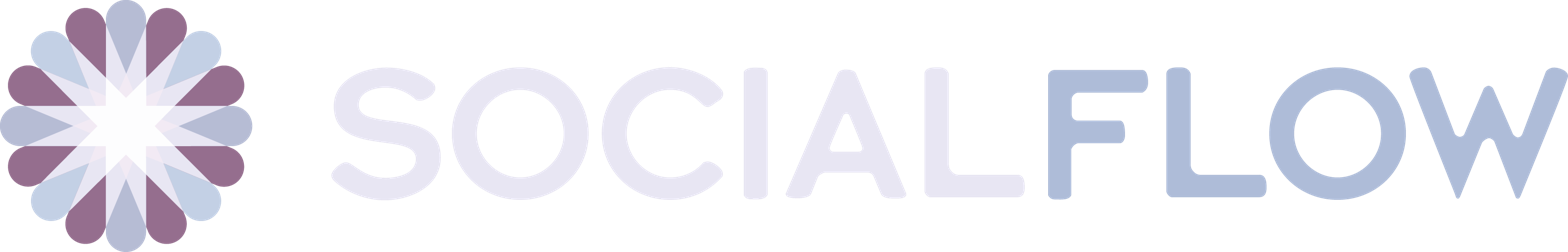
- Industry: Internet / Social media software
- Founded: May 2009
- Founder: Frank Speiser, Mike Perrone
- Headquarters: New York City
- Area served: Worldwide
- Owners: Piano Software (since 2022)
- Website: www.socialflow.com

SocialFlow is a social media optimization (SMO) platform for brands and publishers. The company has provided tools to schedule and optimize posting on social networks using real‑time engagement data and proprietary algorithms. SocialFlow’s analysis of how news of the death of Osama bin Laden propagated on Twitter received broad media coverage and discussion about Twitter’s role in journalism.

On February 10, 2022, SocialFlow was acquired by digital experience platform Piano Software Inc.

== History ==
SocialFlow was founded in early 2009 by Frank Speiser and Mike Perrone, who aimed to apply a more data‑driven approach to building and sustaining social media audiences.

On June 7, 2011, Peter Hershberg joined SocialFlow as President.

In August 2013, SocialFlow was briefly targeted in a phishing‑based incident attributed to the Syrian Electronic Army, which also affected accounts of several media organizations.

=== Funding ===
On April 7, 2011, SocialFlow announced a $7 million Series A round led by SoftBank, with participation from RRE Ventures, betaworks, Highline Venture Partners, AOL Venture Partners, SV Angel and others. On April 16, 2013, the company raised a $10 million Series B led by Fairhaven Capital, joined by existing and new investors.

=== Acquisition ===
In February 2022, Piano announced it would acquire SocialFlow; the transaction was structured as a cash purchase and resulted in Piano acquiring 100% of SocialFlow’s shares.

== Research ==
SocialFlow published "Breaking Bin Laden: Visualizing the Power of a Single Tweet," analyzing the spread of the news on Twitter. The case is also discussed in academic and trade literature.

Another study, “Engaging News‑Hungry Audiences Tweet by Tweet,” compared audience behavior across several news organizations and explored the relationship between posting style and engagement.

== See also ==
- Social media optimization
- Social media management
- Social media analytics
