= Gabriella Coleman =

Internet anthropologist

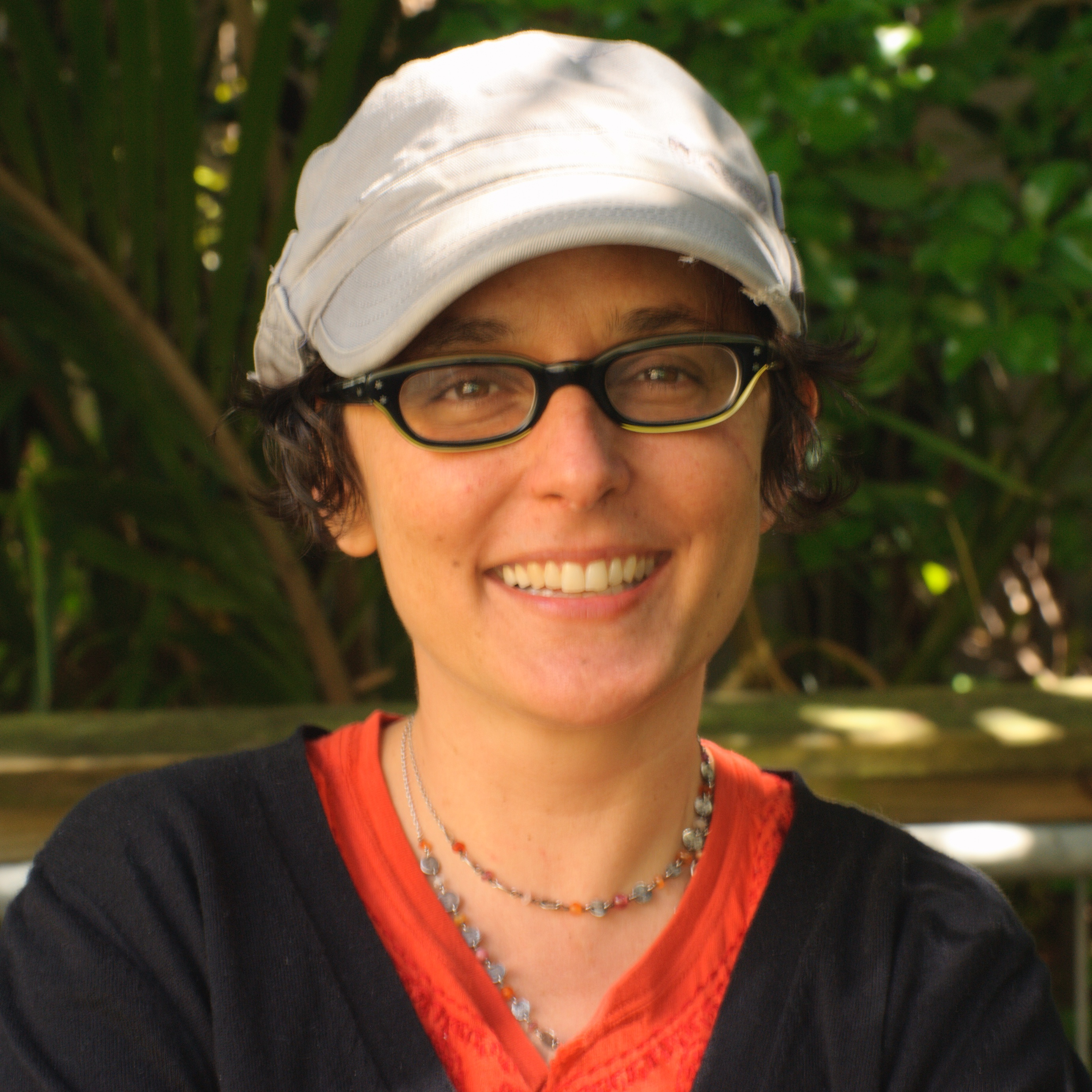
- Coleman in New Zealand, 2012
- Born: 1973 (age 52–53); San Juan, Puerto Rico
- Education: Columbia University
- Occupations: Author, anthropologist, professor
- Employer: Harvard University
- Known for: Anthropological studies of the cultures of hacking and online activism
- Website: www.gabriellacoleman.org

Enid Gabriella Coleman (usually known as Gabriella Coleman or Biella; born 1973) is an anthropologist, academic and author whose work focuses on politics, cultures of hacking and online activism, and has covered distinct hacker communities, such as hackers of free and open-source software, Anonymous and security hackers. She holds the rank of full professor at Harvard University's Department of Anthropology.

== Education ==
After completing her high school education at St. John's School in San Juan, Puerto Rico, Coleman graduated with a Bachelor of Arts in religious studies from Columbia University in May 1996. She moved to the University of Chicago where she completed a Master of Arts in socio-cultural anthropology in August 1999. She was awarded her PhD in socio-cultural anthropology for her dissertation The Social Construction of Freedom in Free and Open Source Software: Hackers, Ethics, and the Liberal Tradition in 2005.

== Academic career ==
Coleman held positions including a postdoctoral fellowship at the Center for Cultural Analysis, Rutgers University and the Izaak Walton Killam Memorial Postdoctoral Fellowship, Program in Science, Technology & Society, University of Alberta before being appointed assistant professor of media, culture and communication at New York University in September 2007.

During 2010–2011, Coleman spent some time working at the Institute for Advanced Study in Princeton as the recipient of the "2010–11 Ginny and Robert Loughlin Founders' Circle Member in the School of Social Science".

In January 2012, she moved to Montreal, Quebec, Canada to take up the Wolfe Chair in Scientific & Technological Literacy at McGill University. The same year, she also spoke at Webstock 2012 in Wellington, New Zealand.

== Study of hackers and hacking ==
While Coleman is best known for her popular ethnography on the hacktivist collective Anonymous, she has published widely on the ethics and politics of computer hacking. Contesting the idea that hackers have a singular ethic, her publications theorize hacker diversity, through the concept of hacker genres, which refers to the multiple historical genealogies from which hackers hail today, as well as the distinct ethical lessons that emerge from these lineages. Along with emphasizing differences among hackers, her work considers the elements that also bind hackers of distinct traditions together, especially through a commitment to what she calls the craft and craftiness of hacking. While hackers, she argues, cultivate the social conditions to produce high quality work (the craft ethic), they also embrace a crafty sensibility, which she characterizes as follows:

What is unique to hackers is how an outward display of craftiness has surpassed mere instrumentality to take on its own, robust life; craftiness and its associated attributes, such as wit and guile, are revered as much for their form as for their function.

Coleman is committed to making her scholarship more widely accessible through various experimental and traditional avenues. In 2019, she launched Hack_Curio—Decoding the Cultures of Hacking, an online museum featuring short video clips on computer hacking, each accompanied by expert-written expository pieces. The goal of the site is to challenge hacker stereotypes and highlight hacking's significance in global culture and politics. She has also appeared in many documentaries on hacker-related topics, and, in 2021, she co-produced and hosted a 10-part series podcast on hackers for BBC Radio 4, entitled The Hackers.

Her inaugural book Coding Freedom: The Ethics and Aesthetics of Hacking, released with a creative commons license, interrogates the principles and paradoxes at the heart of contemporary liberalism from the vantage point of a community dedicated to creating free and open-source software. The book explores how hackers champion what Coleman defines as “productive freedom” in the face of Neo-liberal transformations in intellectual property legislation. This concept encompasses the engineering traditions, licensing mechanisms, and ethical guidelines that hackers have devised to ensure their autonomy. The book also examines what Coleman calls “codes of values” and includes an in-depth examination of the poetics of hacker humor, along with the complex forms of political governance created by hackers that help enable the virtual development of software.

== Study of Anonymous ==
Coleman's work on Anonymous has led to her becoming a regular media commentator in addition to her academic publications. In July 2010, Coleman made reference to the Anonymous "project" or "operation" Chanology against the Church of Scientology and uses what would become a central motif in her descriptions of the group, the "trickster archetype", which she argues is "often not being a very clean and savory character, but perhaps vital for social renewal". Coleman states that she had "been thinking about the linkages between the trickster and hackers" for "a few years" before a stay in hospital led her to read Trickster Makes This World: Mischief, Myth, and Art by Lewis Hyde:

Within the first few pages, it was undeniable: there are many links to be made between the trickster and hacking. Many of these figures, push boundaries of all sorts: they upset ideas of propriety and property; they use their sharpened wits sometimes for play, sometimes for political ends; they get trapped by their cunning (which happens ALL the time with tricksters! That is how they learn); and they remake the world, technically, socially, and legally and includes software, licensing and even forms of literature.

Coleman's theory concerning Anonymous (and associated groups such as 4chan) as the trickster has moved from academia to the mainstream media. Recent references include the three-part series on Anonymous in Wired magazine and The New York Times. Coleman has also been critical of some of the mainstream coverage of Anonymous. In Is it a Crime? The Transgressive Politics of Hacking in Anonymous (with Michael Ralph), Coleman responds to an article on the group by Joseph Menn in the Financial Times, noting:

Instead of merely depicting hackers as virtual pamphleteers for free speech or as digital outlaws, we need to start asking more specific questions about why and when hackers embrace particular attitudes toward different kinds of laws, explore in greater detail what they are hoping to achieve, and take greater care in examining the consequences.

Our Weirdness Is Free: The logic of Anonymous — online army, agent of chaos, and seeker of justice, Triple Canopy 2012 January, is Coleman's first major piece of length on the group and draws from a range of observations of those she describes as "everything and nothing at once". Even Coleman admits she does not fully understand Anonymous, she told the BBC:

You can never have complete certainty as to what's going on, who's involved, "not being able to fully understand who's behind the mask" is what gives Anonymous political power.

Coleman's multi-year ethnographic research on Anonymous culminated in the publication of Hacker Hoaxer Whistleblower Spy: The Many Faces of Anonymous. Awarded the American Anthropological Association's Diane Forsythe prize and described by Alan Moore, the co-author of V for Vendetta as "brilliantly lucid", the book charts the history, rise, and impact of the Anonymous movement. Even though the book deploys journalistic writing conventions, Coleman continues to analytically frame the activity of trolling and Anonymous in terms of tricksterism. She argues in her book that tricksters "are well positioned to impart lessons—regardless of their intent.". And continues to note:

Their actions need not be accepted, much less endorsed, to extract positive value. We may see them as edifying us with liberating or terrifying perspectives, symptomatic of underlying problems that deserve scrutiny, functioning as a positive force toward renewal, or as distorting and confusing shadows.

The white nationalist troll weev, also treated as a foil to Anonymous, is presented as an example of the terrifying side of trickstermism, while Anonymous, argues Coleman, represents a more positive side, a force for political hope and renewal.

The issues of tricksters, trolls and Anonymous was further explored by a group of anthropologists in special issue of the Journal Hau that reviewed Coleman's book.

In 2023, Hau also published her Lewis Morgan Henry Lecture comparing and contrasting Anonymous with the anonymous far right and QAnon, highlighting the subtle yet fundamental—and often overlooked—differences among these three formations, despite their origins on similar image boards.

== Professionalization of hacking and security ==
In 2019, Data & Society, a research institute based in New York City, commissioned Coleman for a piece that eventually became “Wearing Many Hats: The Rise of the Professional Security Hacker”. The study covers the transformative period from 1990 to 2000, during which hackers undertook initiatives to validate their professional standing. Based on archival and interview-based research with former underground hackers, Coleman and her co-author Matt Goerzen explore how these hackers transitioned from being viewed as dangerous anarchists by the government and media to becoming advocates of computer security.

The piece highlights hackers’ pioneering of full-disclosure security research practices, where vulnerabilities were openly shared to promote transparency and accountability within the security community. It also delves into their efforts to shape their public image through strategic maneuvers such as publicity stunts, media collaborations, and rhetorical interventions. A central aspect of their rebranding involved conceptualizing “imaginary hats”—black, white, and gray—symbolizing different attitudes toward legality and ethical boundaries. This symbolic representation allowed hackers to communicate their willingness to operate within established legal frameworks and influenced perceptions of their trustworthiness.

A condensed version of “Wearing Many Hats” was published by the cybersecurity publication ReadMe later in 2022 with the title “From Subversives to CEOs: How Radical Hackers Built Today’s Cybersecurity Industry.”

== Publications ==
- — (2023). From Busting Cults to Breeding Cults: Anonymous h/acktivism vs. the (a)nonymous Far Right and QAnon. Hau: Journal of Ethnographic Theory 13(2): 248–263
- — (2022) Wearing Many Hats: The Rise of the Professional Security Hacker. Data and Society Special Report.
- — (2021) "Reconsidering Anonymity and Anonymous in the Age of Narcissism." In The Aesthetics and Politics of the Online Self. Donatella Della Ratta et al. eds. London: Palgrave Macmillan: 239–262.
- — (2019) How Has the Fight for Anonymity and Privacy Changed? Special Section on online anonymity for Media, Culture & Society 41(4): 565–571.
- — (2019). “The Logics and Legacy of Anonymous.” In International Handbook of International Researchers. Jeremy Hunsinger, Lisbeth Klastrup, Matthew M. Allen, eds. New York: Springer: 1–22.
- — (2017). “Gopher, Translator, and Trickster.” In Truth Be Told. Didier Fassin, ed. Durham: Duke University Press: 19–46.
- — (2017). The Public Interest Hack. Limn: Hacks, Leaks, and Breaches. Gabriella Coleman and Christopher M. Kelty, eds., Issue 8.
- — (2017). "From Internet Farming to Weapons of the Geek". Current Anthropology. 58 (1): 91–102. doi:10.1086/688697. S2CID 151855034.
- — (2014). Hacker, Hoaxer, Whistleblower, Spy: The Many Faces of Anonymous. London: Verso Books. ISBN 9781781685839.
- — (2013). "Anonymous in Context: The Politics and Power behind the Mask" (PDF). Internet Governance Papers. Waterloo, Ontario: The Centre for International Governance Innovation. pp. 1–21.
- — (2013). Coding freedom : the ethics and aesthetics of hacking (PDF). Princeton: Princeton University Press. ISBN 978-0-691-14460-3.
- — (2012). "8. Phreaks, Hackers, and Trolls: The Politics of Transgression and Spectacle". In Mandiberg, Michael (ed.). The Social Media Reader. New York City: New York University Press. pp. 99–119. ISBN 9780814764060.
- — (2010). "Ethnographic approaches to digital media". Annual Review of Anthropology. 39: 487–505. doi:10.1146/annurev.anthro.012809.104945. S2CID 146531830.
- — (2010). "The Hacker Conference: A Ritual Condensation and Celebration of a Lifeworld" (PDF). Anthropological Quarterly. 83 (1): 47–72. doi:10.1353/anq.0.0112. S2CID 142356750. Archived from the original (PDF) on 5 May 2014.
- —; Golub, Alex (1 September 2008). "Hacker practice: Moral genres and the cultural articulation of liberalism" (PDF). Anthropological Theory. 8 (3): 255–277. doi:10.1177/1463499608093814. S2CID 145423454. Archived from the original (PDF) on 28 March 2016.
- — (2008). "20. The Politics of Rationality: Psychiatric Survivor's Challenge to Psychiatry" (PDF). In da Costa, Beatriz; Philip, Kavita (eds.). Tactical biopolitics : art, activism, and technoscience. Cambridge, Massachusetts: MIT Press. pp. 341–364. ISBN 9780262042499. Archived from the original (PDF) on 4 March 2016.
- — (2005). The social construction of freedom in free and open source software: Hackers, ethics, and the liberal tradition (Thesis). Chicago, Illinois: The University of Chicago. 3181325.
- — (2001). "High-Tech guilds in the era of global capital". Anthropology of Work Review. 22 (1): 28–32. doi:10.1525/awr.2001.22.1.28.
