= Dots (video game) =

Touchscreen puzzle mobile game from 2013

- App logo
- Developer: Playdots, Inc.
- Publisher: Betaworks
- Designer: Patrick Moberg
- Platforms: iOS, Android
- Release: iOS; April 30, 2013; Android; August 15, 2013
- Mode: Single-player

Dots is a free mobile game produced by Betaworks and developed at American studio Playdots, Inc. It was released on April 30, 2013 for iOS and on August 15, 2013 for Android. It is no longer available as the game shut down on the March 25, 2023. It has both a single player and online multiplayer modes. A single-player sequel, Two Dots, was released on May 29, 2014.

Gameplay of Dots: users connect lines of dots to eliminate all dots in that line, or close a line to remove all dots of that color from the screen.

Dots was initially produced as a test project examining user interaction with the iOS interface. Within a week after release, it was downloaded more than 1 million times and was the top free app in eight countries. Within two weeks, it had been downloaded 2 million times and users had played approximately 100 million games.

== Reception ==
Reception

Aggregate score
Aggregator	Score
GameRankings	74.00%

Coverage in the tech press focused on the game's simplicity and addictiveness. The New York Times cited the simple interface as a good example of flat design and highlighted the creators' focus on "design with a big D". In an interview with Mashable, the creators suggested that Dots provides a test case for increasing user engagement, and that lessons learned through the app may be applied to other Betaworks properties such as Tapestry (app) or Digg. In another interview with The Wall Street Journal's AllThingsD, the creators commented that they are focused on the user experience, not monetization.

It was awarded best game on handheld devices and best visual design for the 2014 Webby Awards.
