= Memepool =

American weblog active from 1998 to 2013

- Website: www.memepool.com
- Launched: 1998
- Current status: Defunct

Memepool was a multiple-author weblog, active from 1998, that listed links to interesting, obscure, weird, or funny items on the web along with a bit of commentary. Items often included multiple links with contents that conflict or comment on each other, similar to the sarcastic stylings of Suck.com.

== Overview ==
Memepool was founded in 1998 by Joshua Schachter and a number of the early contributors, making it one of the earliest weblogs. It was also one of the most popular early weblogs, with a reputation for strange and surprising links. It was maintained by Schachter and Jeff Smith. Schachter's links collected for Memepool were the predecessor of a project that later became del.icio.us.

Unlike many weblogs, Memepool had no significant element of self-revelation by its authors. The website did not have a commenting system, but many of its links came from emailed submissions from readers.

== Shutdown ==
On March 26, 2012, Memepool had its first posting since April 21, 2008, marking the longest hiatus in the blog's history. The site has been unavailable since at least December 14, 2013.
