= Knowledge engine (disambiguation) =

A knowledge engine generally refers to a tool for automatically extracting and structuring knowledge from unstructured sources, often with a way to search it.

Knowledge engine or Knowledge Engine may also refer to:

- WolframAlpha, a website and service often described as a computational knowledge engine or answer engine
- Knowledge Engine (search engine), a former search engine concept developed by the Wikimedia Foundation
- The mind itself is sometimes referred to as a knowledge engine

== See also ==
- Knowledge Graph (disambiguation), graph-based datastores, often used to by search engines to enhance search results with semantic interconnections
- Knowledge organization, a field of study related to library and information science
- Semantic networks
