= Marco Arment =

American software developer and podcaster (born 1982)

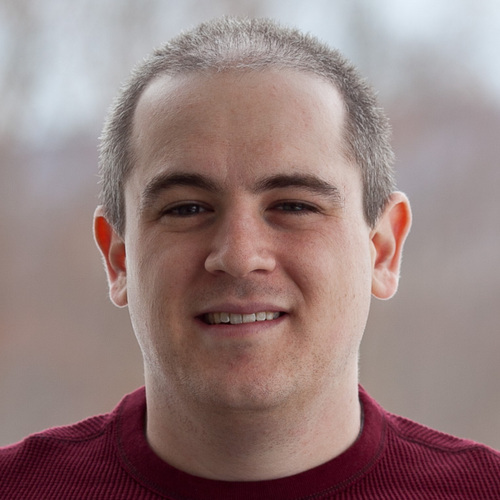
- Arment in 2011
- Born: June 11, 1982 (age 44); Columbus, Ohio, U.S.
- Education: Allegheny College (BS)
- Occupations: Software developer; Web developer; Podcaster; Restaurateur; Writer
- Known for: Tumblr; Instapaper; Overcast; Accidental Tech Podcast
- Spouse: Tiffany Arment
- Website: Marco.org

Marco Arment (born June 11, 1982) is an American iOS developer, web developer, podcaster, restaurateur, technology writer and former magazine editor. As a developer, he is best known for being chief technology officer for Tumblr and creating Instapaper and Overcast.

== Early life and education ==
Marco Arment was born on June 11, 1982, in Columbus, Ohio. He attended Allegheny College in Meadville, Pennsylvania, and graduated in 2004 with a Bachelor of Science degree in computer science.

== Career ==
=== Software Development ===
Arment worked as lead developer and chief technology officer (CTO) of the Tumblr microblogging platform and social networking website from its inception in February 2007 until September 2010, when he left to concentrate fully on Instapaper, a tool for saving web pages to read later. Arment announced on April 25, 2013, that he had sold the controlling interest in Instapaper to Betaworks.

In October 2012, Arment released The Magazine, an electronic, biweekly publication. In May 2013, one month after the sale of Instapaper, Arment announced he was selling The Magazine to Glenn Fleishman, its editor.

In July 2013, Arment released Bugshot, an iOS application for marking up screenshots, to help people report software bugs. Arment transferred ownership of Bugshot to Lickability and the app was renamed to Pinpoint in 2015.

On September 16, 2015, Arment released Peace, a Safari content blocker for iOS 9 using the Ghostery database. After Peace had held the top spot on the App Store's list of paid apps for 36 hours, Arment pulled it from the App Store, stating he didn't "feel good" with its resounding success. He elaborated, "While [ad blockers] do benefit a ton of people in major ways, they also hurt some, including many who don't deserve the hit."

In August 2026, Arment released Unforgetful, a reminders app that uses the Apple Reminders database. The app is available on iOS, iPadOS, and macOS.

=== Podcasts ===
Between November 2010 and December 2012, Arment hosted a podcast, Build and Analyze, with Dan Benjamin on 5by5 Studios. More recently, he has hosted two podcasts: Neutral and the Accidental Tech Podcast, with John Siracusa and Casey Liss. He also hosts Top Four with his wife Tiffany Arment and Under the Radar with David Smith, both on Relay FM.

In July 2014, Arment released Overcast, a podcast application for iOS. He had been working on the application since fall 2012, and publicly announced it at the XOXO festival in September 2013.

In 2014, Arment also invested $50,000 in Gimlet Media.

=== Blogging ===
In December 2006, he launched a blog at Marco.org. As of July 2014, the blog received more than 500,000 page views per month.

On January 4, 2015, Arment posted an article to Marco.org about Apple's declining software quality that unexpectedly went viral. It was picked up by Business Insider, The Huffington Post, CNN, Heise, and a televised CNBC discussion segment, among others. Arment expressed his regret in a follow-up post the next day: "You might think this is a dream come true for a blogger, but it's horrible. Instead, I looked back at what I wrote with regret, guilt, and embarrassment." Arment expressed remorse for adding to the fear of imminent doom that regularly surrounds Apple instead of the more gradual decline in quality and constructive criticism he intended.
