= Rands =

Blogger, software engineering manager, and webcomic author

Michael Lopp
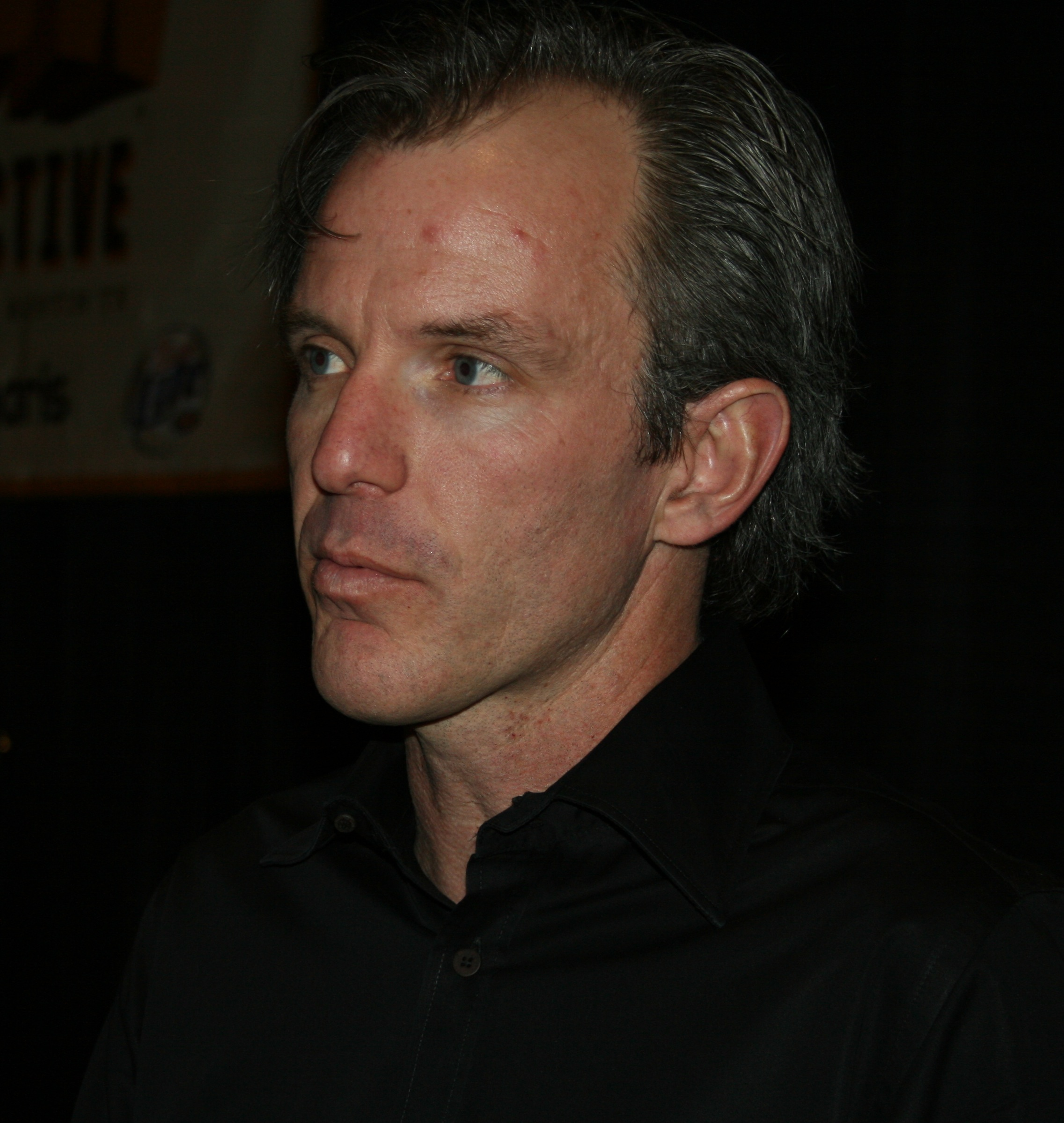
- At Black Hat USA 2008
- Born: 1970 (age 55–56)
- Writing career
- Pen name: Rands
- Notable works: Jerkcity, Managing Humans, Being Geek
- Website: www.randsinrepose.com

Rands is the pen name and alter ego of Michael Lopp (born 1970 in California), a blogger, software engineering manager, and webcomic author. Lopp originally used the name "Rands" as his chat room handle, and it is his persona when writing about software management. Rands is his wife's maiden name, though they were dating at the time he chose it. In 2010, he began working at Palantir after more than eight years at Apple. In June 2014 after 4 years he left Palantir for Pinterest. He became Vice President of Engineering at Slack in May 2016, then left Slack in 2019 to return to Apple as Senior Director of Engineering in 2020.

== Web publications ==
Starting in 1996, Lopp wrote The BitSifter Digest, a website that published "the more interesting collections of bits which arrive at our desks" once a week, which increased in frequency and became daily by 2001. According to Steve Baldwin of disobey.com's Ghost Sites, it received recognition for its "pioneering use of borderless frames" and "topical, eclectic editorial content", and "was an important forerunner of the 'Blog.'" The BitSifter Digest stopped updating in 2001 and no longer exists at the domain name bitsifter.com.

Lopp co-created the webcomic Jerkcity (now BoneQuest), which started in 1998 and included a character named "Rands".

In April 2002, Lopp started a blog titled Rands in Repose. It explains aspects of technological or corporate culture, with particular focus on techniques for improving management skills. For example, one post explains the nuances of an interesting application, and another identifies and names workplace stereotypes. Posts contain a level of observational humor, such as direct explanations of management jargon.

== Print publications ==
In June 2005, an essay by Lopp was published in the book The Best Software Writing I, edited by Joel Spolsky. The essay was the July 2004 post on Rands in Repose titled "What To Do When You're Screwed."

In June 2007, Lopp published a book titled Managing Humans: Biting and Humorous Tales of a Software Engineering Manager. A supporting website, Managing Humans, gives a brief pitch for the book.

In August 2010, Lopp published his second book titled Being Geek: A Software Developer's Career Handbook. A website, Being Geek, supports the publishing of the book and includes an original teaser video for the book.
