= Chartbeat =

American web analytics company

- Type: Private
- Industry: Data and analytics
- Predecessor: Betaworks
- Founded: 2009
- Headquarters: New York City, United States
- Owner: Cuadrilla Capital
- Website: chartbeat.com

Chartbeat is a technology company that provides data and analytics to global publishers. Founded by Betaworks in 2009 in New York City, the company was spun off in 2010 and purchased by Cuadrilla Capital in 2022.

The software as a service (SaaS) company integrates code into the websites of publishers, media companies and news organizations to track users in order to monetize audience engagement and loyalty metrics so they can make decisions about the content to publish and promote on their websites. Chartbeat has been praised and criticized as an alternative to Google Analytics for real-time data.

== History ==
Betaworks launched Chartbeat in April 2009 as a real-time web analytics tool that publishers could use to react quickly to changes in user behavior. At the time, Google Analytics did not offer real-time data. The launch of Chartbeat was part of a broader strategy by Betaworks to capitalize on the growth of the real-time, stream-based, social web. Betaworks had also invested in Twitter, Tumblr, bit.ly, and TweetDeck.

In August 2010, Chartbeat was spun off from Betaworks, after raising $3 million in Series A funding. In July 2011, Chartbeat launched Newsbeat, a version of their service for news sites. Index Ventures led the company's seed funding round. Under CEO Tony Haile, ChartBeat raised $9.5 million in April 2012, with Draper Fisher Jurvetson leading the funding round.

In 2014, it expanded its analytics tools to include paid content, with tools catered for publishers and advertisers. It raised $15.5 million in 2015, bringing total raised to $31 million. In February 2016, founding CEO Tony Haile resigned from the company after seven years as CEO. Long-time COO John Saroff was named as his successor. In October 2017, Chartbeat made updates to its user experience and design, including the rebranding of its flagship product as Chartbeat for Publishing.

By 2022, John Saroff remained CEO. At the time, 90% of its revenue was from large enterprise media companies. It was purchased by Cuadrilla Capital in July 2022. In 2023, it acquired Tubular Labs and Lineup Systems. In March 2025, it acquired the ad software company FatTail.
