= Knowledge Graph =

A knowledge graph is a knowledge base that uses a graph-structured data model.

Knowledge Graph may also refer to:

- Knowledge Graph (Google), a knowledge graph that powers the Google search engine and other services
- Bing Knowledge Graph or Satori, used by the Bing search engine
- LinkedIn Knowledge Graph (LKG), a knowledge base for LinkedIn

== See also ==
- Conceptual graph
- Graph database
- Knowledge base
- Knowledge engine (disambiguation)
- Social graph, such as Facebook's "entity graph"
