= Urbanears =

Headphone company

- Industry: Consumer electronics
- Founded: November 2009
- Founder: Norra Norr; Zound Industries
- Headquarters: Stockholm, Sweden
- Area served: Worldwide
- Parent: Marshall
- Website: urbanears.com

Urbanears is a Scandinavian collective that produces headphones along with headphone accessories. Founded by Norra Norr and Zound Industries (now Marshall Group) in 2009, the collective was founded with the goal of making headphones and audio products.

== Main products ==
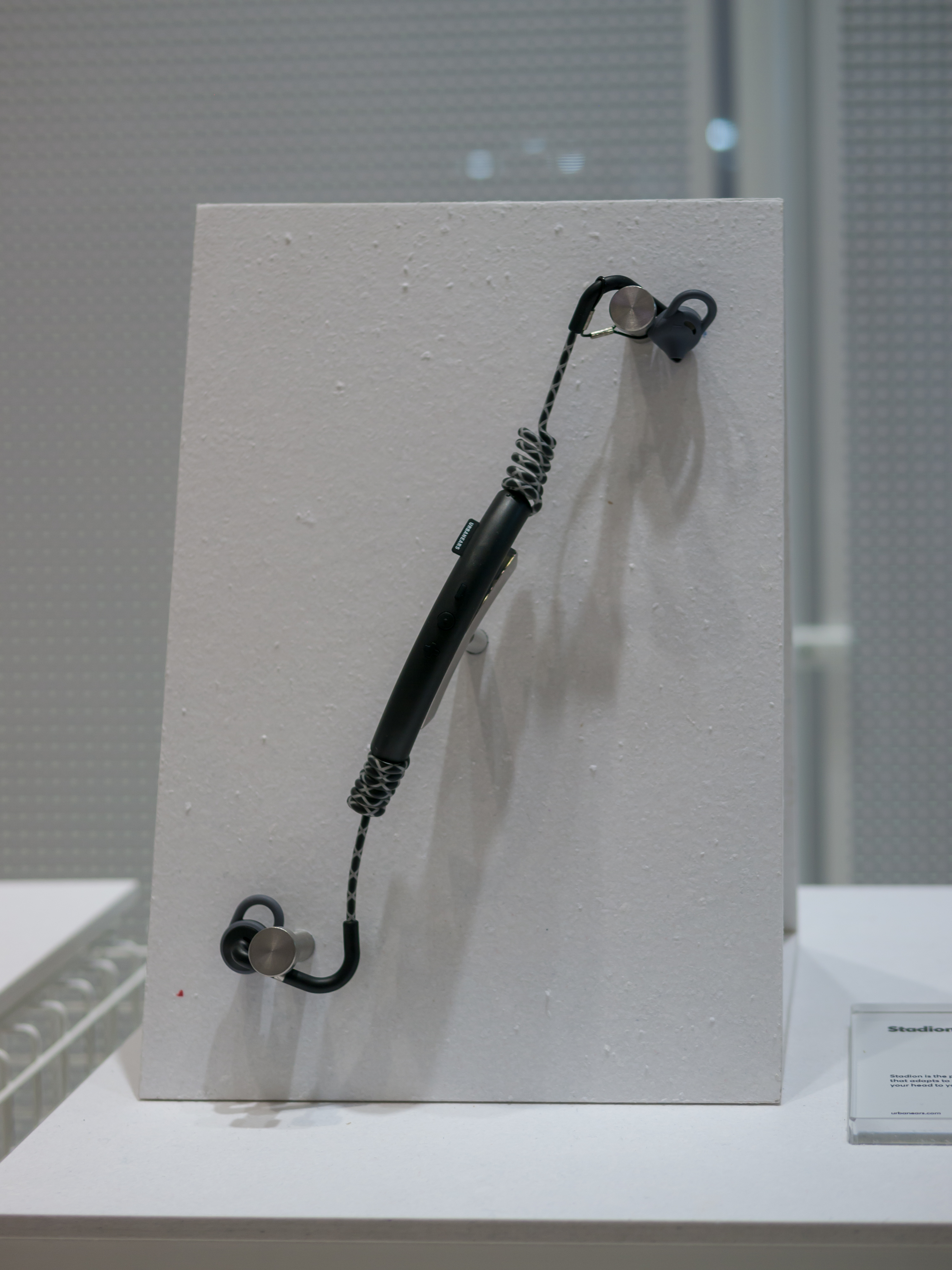
Urbanears Stadion headphones

=== Zinken ===
The Zinken is a pair of headphones released in July 2012, aimed at professional DJs and amateurs alike and made to work in various environments. The headphones come with a Urbanears TurnCable, which is a reversible cable with rugged Kevlar inside, featuring a coiled section to allow more freedom of movement and a 6.3mm plug to be used with a mixer and a 3.5mm for use with a regular mobile device.

They have been shown to have good bass and treble in reviews while the middle of the spectrum has been critiqued as possibly a bit lacking. The headphones have been praised for looking good, having a sturdy build, great sound isolation and low sound leakage and being comfortable even during long usage, only receiving critique about the sound becoming distorted at very high volumes just as with other headphones in the same range. They are now discontinued.

=== Plattan ===
The Plattan is a pair of classical headphones released in 2009.

They received positive remarks regarding generally good sound quality for the price, with somewhat subpar highs, being good-looking and having good build quality, but had some people left unsatisfied due to them becoming uncomfortable after a few hours of usage.

==== Plattan ADV ====
The Plattan ADV was released on 18 November 2014 as a pumped up upgrade to the pair of classics, featuring a washable headband, an interchangeable cable and an improved hinge to adjust to the listener's ears providing a soft and comfortable fit.

=== Slussen ===
The Slussen is an adapter released on 1 February 2013 designed for use with the Slussen iOS app for mobile DJing, functioning as a splitter allowing two separate output streams to be passed out through a single headphone jack.

It has received critique for having subpar scratching and output distortion when peak volumes are set, just like with many other similar products. Concerns have also been voiced regarding the durability of the key ring holder, but it has generally been praised for the ease of use, portability and great aesthetics.

=== Plattan 2 ===
Plattan 2 released on 14 December 2016.

They have a fabric cord, built-in mic/remote, and a two way audio input.
