= Instapaper =

Social bookmarking service

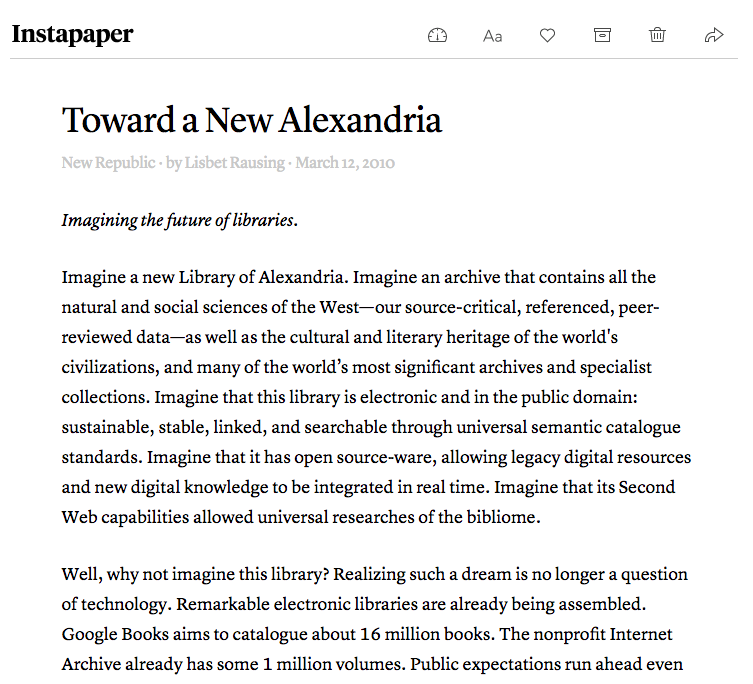
- An example of an article being read in the website
- Website type: Online bookmarking, saving articles for later reading
- Owners: Instant Paper, Inc. (previously Pinterest)
- Creator: Marco Arment
- Website: www.instapaper.com
- Commercial: Yes
- Registration: Yes
- Launched: January 28, 2008; 18 years ago
- Current status: Active
- Written in: Python

Instapaper is a social bookmarking service that allows web content to be saved so it can be "read later" on a different device, such as an e-reader, smartphone, or tablet. The service was founded in 2008 by Marco Arment. In April 2013, Arment sold a majority stake to Betaworks and by mid 2016 Pinterest acquired the company. In July 2018, ownership of Instapaper was transferred from Pinterest to a newly formed company Instant Paper, Inc. The transition was completed on August 6, 2018.

== History ==
Instapaper started out as a simple web service in late 2007 with a "Read Later" bookmarklet and stripped-down "Text" view for articles. When Marco Arment launched the service publicly on January 28, 2008, its simplicity rapidly earned accolades from the press, including Daring Fireball and TechCrunch.

In April 2013, Arment sold a majority stake in Instapaper to Betaworks. Afterward, the service's web interface was redesigned.

On August 23, 2016, Instapaper was acquired by social networking service Pinterest. The service continued to operate, and the Instapaper staff worked on development for both Instapaper and Pinterest. On November 1, 2016, Instapaper announced that it would discontinue its subscription model and offer its "Premium" features to all users. On July 16, 2018, it was announced that Pinterest would sell Instapaper to InstantPaper, Inc, "a new company owned and operated by the same people who’ve been working on Instapaper since it was sold to Betaworks by Marco Arment in 2013".

On May 23, 2018, Instapaper announced that it had suspended its services for residents of the European Union in order to address compliance with General Data Protection Regulation (GDPR) requirements. Service was restored on August 7, 2018.

On July 21, 2025, Kobo announced that Instapaper was chosen to replace Pocket in their e-reader devices.

== Features ==
Instapaper can be used via a web-based interface, or through mobile apps for Android and iOS. Within a web browser, a "Read Later" bookmarklet can be used to save pages to a user's personal unread queue on Instapaper. Every article is automatically reformatted to remove excessive formatting and graphics.

Instapaper was initially distributed as a paid app. Later, the app became a free service, but with certain features exclusive to a "Pro" version of the app, and later an "Instapaper Premium" subscription, such as ad-free browsing, full-text search, and voice dictation on supported platforms. These features became free for all users on November 1, 2016.

=== iOS ===
Instapaper's free iPhone app (removed from the App Store on March 12, 2011) with offline reading was one of the first apps in the App Store on July 12, 2008. Instapaper's paid app, then called Instapaper Pro, launched shortly afterward on August 26, 2008 and introduced tilt scrolling, which automatically scrolls a column of text when the device is tilted slightly up or down.

On March 10, 2011, with the launch of the 3.0 app, Instapaper added social sharing and browsing features. Later in 2011, the redesigned 4.0 app added full-text search of all saved articles for customers with the optional $1/month subscription.

The Instapaper iPad app launched with the iPad itself on April 3, 2010.

=== Android ===
The Instapaper for Android was built by development shop Mobelux in 2012 and supports Android phones and tablets.

=== Kindle ===
An automatic send-to-Kindle feature was added on March 8, 2009. The Kindle feature alone is used by over 60,000 Kindle owners as of late 2011. Manually sending individual articles, or digests of recent articles, from the Instapaper app is currently a Subscriber feature.

=== The Feature ===
On June 1, 2008, Instapaper launched Give Me Something to Read, a standalone website that featured a few high-quality, longform, nonfiction articles every day from Instapaper's most frequently saved articles.

Unlike a conventional social news website, which carries stories posted automatically by popularity, Give Me Something to Read is human-edited. Marco Arment was the editor for the site's first year. On July 27, 2009, Arment hired Richard Dunlop-Walters as a part-time contractor to take over as editor. As of March 2011, Dunlop-Walters was Instapaper's only employee besides Arment.

On March 22, 2012, Give Me Something to Read was renamed The Feature. The articles are still hand-picked, and they are featured in Instapaper's website as The Feature, and in the iOS app as The Feature section.

== Competitors and similar services ==
Instapaper is one of several "read it later" (also known as "read later" or "saving") services. In November 2013, Mashable named Instapaper and the following four clients as the "5 Best Read-It-Later Apps"; they all support a variety of devices and other apps.

- Pocket (originally titled "Read It Later"), began as a Firefox extension in late 2007, similar to Readeroo but using local browser storage, before matching Instapaper's core features later in 2008 and 2009. As of October 2013, it integrated with more than 300 apps, such as Flipboard and Twitter. Mozilla discontinued Pocket in 2025.
- Readability, released in 2009 and discontinued in 2016, allowed users to share to their social media accounts and easily send articles to their Amazon Kindle. Top Reads displayed the most popular Readability articles and was fully integrated with Flipboard, Longform, Pulse, and Twitter clients such as Tweetbot.
- Evernote, rolled out in 2011, allows users to download articles to the Evernote app as well as to the Chrome, Firefox, or Opera browser; it also works with Evernote Business and in conjunction with the Evernote Web Clipper. Web Clipper works with the aforementioned browsers, as well as Internet Explorer and Safari. As of January 22, 2016, Evernote discontinued support for Clearly. It is no longer available for download, and no further updates will be made to the extension. Customers with existing installations of the Clearly browser extension can continue using it.
- ReadKit is an app for Mac devices (only) that supports Instapaper, Pocket, and Readability as well as Delicious, Feed Wrangler, FeedBin, Feedly, Fever, NewsBlur, and Pinboard. The app aggregates all of one's content from the abovementioned sources, so one need not switch from one app to another.

== See also ==
- IFTTT
- Pinboard
