= Pinboard (website) =

Social bookmarking website

- Website type: Social bookmarking
- Owner: Maciej Cegłowski
- Creator: Maciej Cegłowski
- Operating income: $228k/year (2024)
- Website: pinboard.in
- Commercial: Yes
- Launched: July 2009; 17 years ago
- Current status: Active

Pinboard (also called Pinboard.in) is a social bookmarking website developed and run by Maciej Cegłowski. It has a plain design and a focus on personal management of bookmarks using tags to organize them, similar to early versions of the Delicious social bookmarking service.

== History ==
When Pinboard launched in July 2009, it charged an approximately $3 signup fee for new users. This fee automatically increased by a fraction of a cent for each new user, a system intended to slow the growth of the site, to make enough money to sustain development, and to discourage spammers from joining. A few months later Cegłowski released an option to save ("archive") copies of bookmarked web pages with a $25 yearly subscription fee, and Pinboard became his full-time job with 1,200 users.

New users joined Pinboard at a gradual pace until December 2010, when information leaked from Yahoo! indicated an uncertain future for Delicious, which it had owned since 2005. Many people reacted by joining Pinboard; it grew to 16,000 users by the end of the month, with a signup fee incrementally increased to $9.

By October 2011, Pinboard had 25,000 registered users (including 18,000 active users) and continued to be a one-person company. Additional users joined Pinboard in September 2011 after Delicious was acquired by AVOS Systems and relaunched with less of a focus on personal bookmarking features. Following these changes at Delicious, many members of fan fiction and fandom communities switched from using Delicious to Pinboard, especially after Cegłowski solicited feature suggestions from the fan community and received a detailed and organized collective response.

In January 2015, Pinboard switched to charging an $11 annual fee for new accounts instead of an automatically increasing one-time signup fee.

On 1 June 2017, Pinboard acquired Delicious. Delicious users were no longer able to save new bookmarks after June 15, 2017. Delicious users have the option to export their bookmarks or migrate to a Pinboard subscription account instead. The ultimate fate of Delicious has not yet been announced.

As of July 2020, Maciej Ceglowski announced on Twitter that he was "making some progress on getting Delicious back up."

In February 2021 Maciej sent out an email asking users on grandfathered-in accounts to voluntarily switch to the annual fee structure, which had also increased to $22 per year, while the archiving accounts had gone up to $39. The idea being that the extra income would allow for hiring additional staff to take care of infrastructure and user support, while he was free to focus on adding new features.

As of July 2024, Pinboard contained 288 million bookmarks for 233 million URLs.

== Product ==
Cegłowski said that he created Pinboard "partly out of frustration with a redesign of Delicious that I felt removed a lot of utility from the site," and the site includes Delicious-style bookmarking features with a personal list of tagged bookmarks and ways to edit and organize those bookmarks. Users can install a bookmarklet button in their web browser to add a Pinboard bookmark while visiting a website, and they can import bookmarks from Delicious and other services. Pinboard can automatically bookmark links from a user's Instapaper, Pocket, and Twitter accounts. Pinboard also includes ways to view and subscribe to the public bookmarks of other users. It can also be used via IFTTT. Pinboard supports exporting bookmarks in a standard HTML format (understandable by browsers and other bookmarking services), in XML, and in JSON.

Pinboard is supported by users paying for accounts; the site does not carry advertising.

== Publicity ==
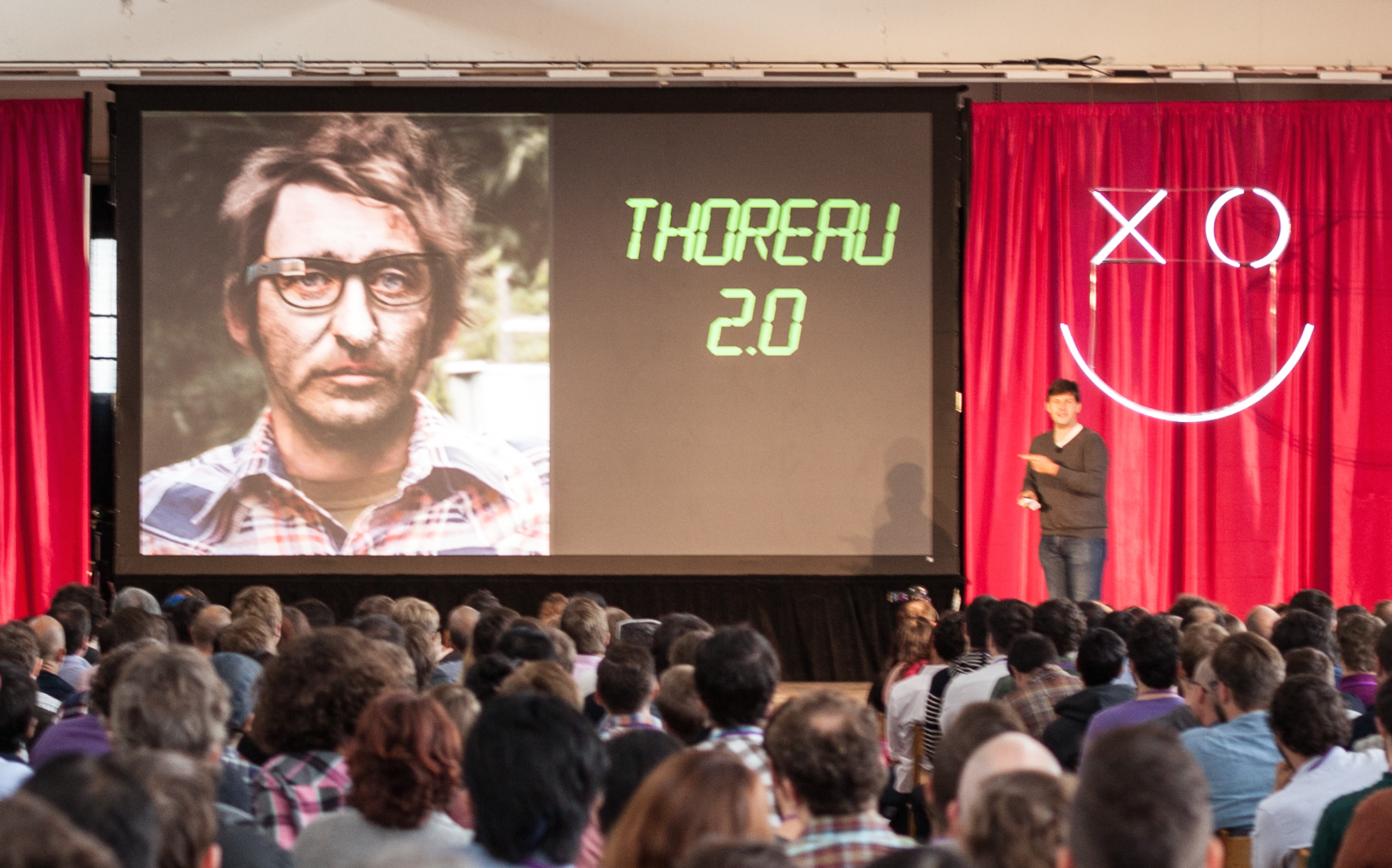
Cegłowski speaking at XOXO Festival in September 2013.

Cegłowski writes a Pinboard blog on topics including new features, site growth, the benefits of paying for services in general, technical aspects of running Pinboard, and critical commentary about social websites like Facebook. Cegłowski has discussed prioritizing speed and stability over using cutting-edge technologies for building Pinboard.

In December 2012, Cegłowski announced a project called the Pinboard Investment Co-Prosperity Cloud, offering $37 and promotion for six startup companies, to encourage bootstrapping technology companies with low costs. He awarded winners in January 2013.

He has spoken at conferences about his experience running Pinboard, including listening to users from the fandom community and "failing really, really slowly" (working on a project for a long time instead of looking for immediate success). He also gave a talk about the negative effects of advertising being the economic foundation of the web, as a model that encourages the growth of surveillance.
