= Joshua Schachter =

American entrepreneur and the creator of Delicious

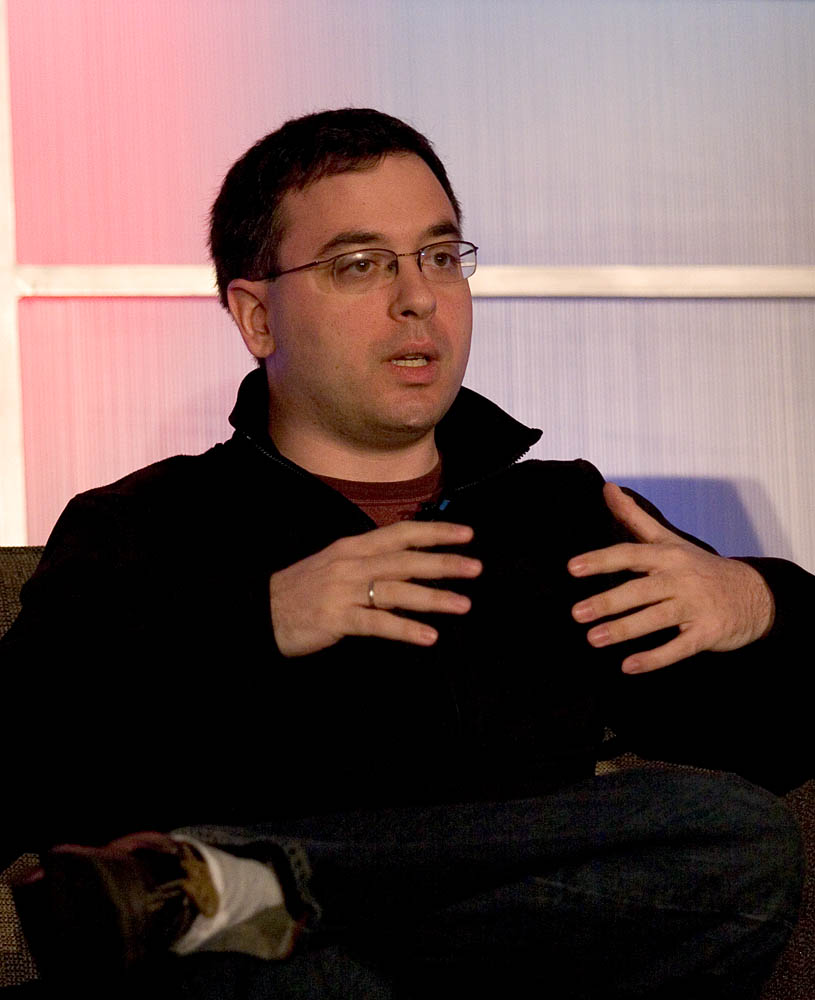
Joshua Schachter

Joshua Schachter (/ˈʃæktər/; born January 1, 1974) is an American entrepreneur and the creator of Delicious and GeoURL, and co-creator of Memepool. He holds a B.S. in electrical and computer engineering from Carnegie Mellon University in Pittsburgh.

Schachter released his first version of Delicious (then called del.icio.us) in September 2003. The service coined the term social bookmarking and featured tagging, a system he developed for organizing links suggested to Memepool; he published some of them on his personal linkblog, Muxway. On March 29, 2005, Schachter announced he would work full-time on Delicious. On December 9, 2005, Yahoo! acquired Delicious for an undisclosed sum. According to Business 2.0, the acquisition price was $30 million, with Schachter's share being worth approximately $15 million.

Prior to working full-time on Delicious, Schachter was an analyst with Morgan Stanley's Equity Trading Lab. In 2002, he developed GeoURL and ran it until 2004. Schacter started the "geowanking" mailing list.

In 2006, Schachter was named to the MIT Technology Review TR35 as one of the top 35 innovators in the world under the age of 35. In June 2008, Schachter announced his decision to leave Yahoo!. TechCrunch reported that rumors about mass resignations of Yahoo! senior staff prompted his decision to leave.

Schachter worked for Google from January 2009 to June 2010.
