= Betaworks =

American startup studio and seed stage venture capital company

Betaworks Studio, LLC
- Company type: Private
- Industry: Venture Capital; Business Studio
- Founded: 2007; 19 years ago
- Founder: John Borthwick
- Headquarters: New York City, United States
- Website: betaworks.com

Betaworks Studio, LLC is an American startup studio and seed stage venture capital company based in New York City that invests in network-focused media businesses.

Its hybrid investor/builder model has led to investments in fast-growing startups such as Tumblr, Airbnb, Groupon, and Twitter; and more exclusive stakes in internally built startups such as Chartbeat, Bitly, and SocialFlow. Betaworks was founded in 2007 by John Borthwick.

In 2016, the company gained some attention through "The Intern" podcast, hosted and produced by employee Allison Behringer.

In 2016, Betaworks sold its Instapaper product to Pinterest, a social media scrapbooking site, .

== Studio ==
Current:

- Activate (app) helps people discover and follow their favorite blogs. The site was founded in Sweden and has over 2 million members, 70% of them who follow fashion blogs & over 90% who are female. Shortly after it took $1 million of investment from Betaworks and Lerer Hippeau Ventures in 2012, traffic spiked following Google's announcement to discontinue Google Reader.
- In April 2013, the company released Dots, a video game downloaded over 10 million times.

Former:

- Chartbeat, which provides realtime analytics to websites and blogs. It shows visitors, load times, and referring.
- Bitly, which that allows users to shorten, share, and track links (URLs). Reducing the URL length makes sharing easier.
- Giphy lets anyone search for animated gifs on the web. It was born out of an experiment by two hackers in residence, Alex Chung and Jace Cooke, who found it difficult to browse the best gifs on the web. It spread unexpectedly quickly, serving millions of results in the first few weeks. "We could tell it struck a nerve, so we swarmed it," said Paul Murphy, the head of product at Betaworks told The Verge In May 2020, it was announced that Giphy had agreed to be acquired by Facebook Inc. (now Meta Platforms), with a reported purchase price of $400 million. Facebook services had accounted for roughly half of Giphy's overall traffic. Giphy was to be integrated with the staff of Facebook subsidiary Instagram, although Facebook stated that there would be no immediate changes to the service.
- SocialFlow, which optimizes the real-time value of content.
- In July 2012, the company acquired the Digg brand and internet assets for US$500,000 and merged it with News.me, a social news reading app. Digg was purchased by BuySellAds, an advertising company, for an undisclosed amount in April 2018.
- In April 2013, the company acquired a majority stake in Instapaper, then sold it to Pinterest in 2016.

== See also ==
- Piictu, acquired in 2013
