= Dana Chisnell =

American technologist

- Education: Michigan State University (B.A.)
- Employer(s): California Office of Digital Innovation, NCoC, Harvard Kennedy School, Center for Civic Design, UsabilityWorks, USDS, MIT, E-Trade
- Known for: Founding member of USDS, Policy Design at NCoC, pioneer of Civic Design, and designing ballots and Electronic voting interfaces to ensure voter intent.
- Website: danachisnell.com

Dana Chisnell is an American public interest technologist, civic designer, adjunct lecturer and Fellow at the Harvard Kennedy School of Government.

== Career ==
Chisnell began her career in 1987, working with banks, insurance companies, and tech companies as a designer and usability researcher. In 2001, Chisnell began consulting as UsabilityWorks.

In 2013, Chisnell co-founded the Center for Civic Design, a non-profit focused on voter intent through design. Chisnell served as co-executive director with Whitney Quesenbery until January 2020. As part of the center, Chisnell led research on what became the Anywhere Ballot and was the originator and managing editor of the Field Guides to Ensuring Voter Intent. The Field Guides are featured in a collection on Design and Democracy hosted by the Cooper Hewitt Museum and Smithsonian Design Museum.

In 2014, Chisnell was a founding member of the United States Digital Service in the Executive Office of the President of the United States.

Chisnell taught a course on Designing Government as an adjunct lecturer at the Harvard Kennedy School from 2017 to 2020.

Chisnell is the co-author of the Handbook of Usability Testing Second Edition (Wiley 2008).

== Achievements and awards ==
In 2019, Chisnell was named by Apolitical as one of the world's most influential people in digital government.

== Bibliography ==
Books

- Rubin, Jeffrey, Dana Chisnell, Jared M. Spool. Handbook of Usability Testing: How to Plan, Design, and Conduct Effective Tests (ISBN 0470185481).
- Taylor, Lee & Dana Chisnell. FutureTense Texture: Effective Web Design in 3 Days (ISBN 1850328935)
- Taylor, Lee & Jennifer Atkinson, Dana Chisnell. NetObjects Fusion 2.0: Effective Web Design in 3 Days (ISBN 1576103226)

Articles

- Chisnell, Dana. "Democracy is a design problem." Journal of Usability Studies 2016: 124-130
- Redish, Ginny & Dana Chisnell, Sharon Laskowski, Svetlana Lowry. "Plain language makes a difference when people vote." Journal of Usability Studies 2010: 81-103
- Chisnell, Dana. "Talking to strangers on the street: Recruiting through intercepting people." User Experience Magazine 2015
- Chisnell, Dana. "How to KJ: Setting priorities quickly." User Experience Magazine 2014
- Quesenbery, Whitney and Dana Chisnell. "Voting in New York City: Why is ballot design so hard to get right?" User Experience Magazine 2011
