= Tweetbot =

Former application for Twitter

- Developer: Tapbots LLC
- Release: iPhone: April 14, 2011 iPad: February 8, 2012; Mac: October 18, 2012
- Final release: iPhone: Tweetbot for iOS 7.2, released January 11, 2023 iPad: Tweetbot for iOS 7.2, released January 11, 2023 macOS: Tweetbot 3 for Mac, version 3.5.8, released June 2, 2022.
- Operating system: iOS, macOS, iPadOS
- Type: Twitter client
- License: Proprietary
- Website: tapbots.com/tweetbot/

Tweetbot was a third-party Twitter client developed for iOS, iPadOS, and macOS created by Tapbots LLC. It was discontinued and removed from the App Store on January 19, 2023, following a decision made by Twitter to prohibit third-party apps from its API.

== History ==
Tweetbot was initially released on April 14, 2011, by Tapbots on the App Store. It was only available for the iPhone at that time. Features were added to the program over time, including multiple account switching, in-timeline viewing of images and YouTube video thumbnails, push notifications, and the ability to mute certain users and topics in the timeline view temporarily. Customization of two tabs became available in the application, and updates after the release of iOS 5 added other features such as left and right swiping of a Twitter message to follow individual conversation threads.

The app's slogan was "A Twitter client with personality", which is meant to emulate a friendly robot, as the Tapbots' other programs do. The program also had universal syncing through iCloud, allowing for bookmarking between the iPhone, iPad and Mac clients.

On June 11, 2012, Tapbots announced the launch of an alpha version of Tweetbot for Mac. Since October 18, 2012, the final version is available in the Mac App Store, which includes all features of the iOS version.

Subsequently, on October 3, 2012, a sister app featuring most of the features of Tweetbot, Netbot, was released by Tapbots for the paid Twitter competitor App.net.

On November 19, 2012, Tapbots released version 2.6.1. The notable update in this version was a tweaked user interface, modifying the design of icons and buttons.

On February 4, 2013, Tapbots released version 2.7 of Tweetbot. Added features include support for inline viewing of Vine video clips as well as options to set a default browser for external links. Shortly after, version 2.7.1 was released to fix a bug in the 2.7 update that caused the application to crash at launch for many users.

On October 17, 2013, Tapbots submitted version 3.0 of Tweetbot to the App Store team for review. Version 3.0 is an update to match the new design of iOS 7.

On July 1, 2014, Tapbots updated Tweetbot to version 1.6 for Mac, introducing multiple image upload feature and fixed other minor bugs.

On June 4, 2015, Tapbots announced Tweetbot 2.0 for Mac. The update introduced a new look to match the aesthetic of OS X Yosemite and a new starting price. The update was free for existing users.

On October 1, 2015, Tapbots released version 4.0 of Tweetbot. Added features include iPad support, landscape support for iPhone and iPad, new statistics and activity view, new column view in landscape on iPad and iPhone 6 Plus, split view multi-tasking on iPad, quick reply from notifications, Safari view controller with content blocker support, and a new user interface. Tweetbot 4 also improved its mute filter settings, status details, user profiles, and optimizations to the app itself. It is the first application that requires iOS 9 on the device. It cannot be downloaded with earlier versions of the mobile operating system, as the program supports only the English localization.

On November 3, 2015, Tweetbot 4.1 was released by Tapbots. For the first time, the app supports Apple Watch and displays alerts for new favorite, new follows, and mentions. Just click on the alert for a detailed view and right from the Apple Watch you can follow back, retweet or favorite based on the kind of alert it is. Once you are in the detailed view, a quick tap on the avatar displays user's profile. You can see their bio, locations, profile picture and also an option to DM, follow or unfollow and reply them.

On May 16, 2018, Tapbots announced Tweetbot 3.0 for Mac. The update introduced a new look and Expandable Sidebar, Night Mode, and automatic playback videos and GIF media.

On January 26, 2021, Tapbots released Tweetbot 6 for iOS and iPad. The update features new themes, a new Direct Message Interface, a new San Francisco font, and makes Tweetbot a subscription-based app. The app is free on the iOS App Store and includes a seven-day free trial, after which Tweetbot can be purchased by a monthly or yearly subscription.

On January 4, 2022, Tapbots released Tweetbot 6.8 for iOS. The update introduced the option to see a user's header, bio, how many people they follow/follow them including likes, followers, DMs and more. They can also see the latest accounts that had followed them. They also added themes like Lavender and Wine themes. They also changed the logo to an owl. They have also added support to create polls.

On January 12, 2023, at approximately 10:30 p.m. EDT, Tweetbot—along with several other Twitter clients—stopped functioning. Internal documents obtained by The Information show that the outage was an intentional decision by Twitter. Three days later, Tweetbot switched out its API keys for new ones, bypassing Twitter's restrictions, albeit with lower usage limits. Twitter then revoked these API keys several hours later. On January 19, 2023, the app was discontinued to comply with new Twitter API restrictions that prohibit the creation and availability of third-party clients based around it. Tapbots subsequently announced a beta version of a Mastodon client known as Ivory.

== Reception ==
PC Magazine praised it for design and customization, but criticized the lack of support for multiple Twitter accounts, an issue that was addressed in later versions. Mac Stories called it "excellent", the reviewer's favorite Twitter client. The Daily Telegraph gave it 4/5 stars. Macworld praised its "impressive" feature set and design.
