= Delicious (website) =

Discontinued American social bookmarking web service

- The Delicious home page in 2011
- Website type: Online social bookmarking
- Owner: Maciej Cegłowski
- Creator: Joshua Schachter
- Website: https://del.icio.us
- Commercial: Yes
- Registration: Optional; Unavailable
- Launched: September 2003; 23 years ago
- Current status: Inactive

Delicious (stylized del.icio.us) was a social bookmarking web service for storing, sharing, and discovering web bookmarks. The site was founded by Joshua Schachter and Peter Gadjokov in 2003 and acquired by Yahoo! in 2005. By the end of 2008, the service claimed more than 5.3 million users and 180 million unique bookmarked URLs. Yahoo sold Delicious to AVOS Systems in April 2011, and the site relaunched in a "back to beta" state on September 27 that year. In May 2014, AVOS sold the site to Science Inc. In January 2016 Delicious Media, a new alliance, reported it had assumed control of the service.

In June 2017 Delicious was acquired by Pinboard, and the bookmarking service was discontinued.

== Functionality ==
Delicious used a non-hierarchical classification system in which users could tag each of their bookmarks with freely chosen index terms (generating a kind of folksonomy). A combined view of everyone's bookmarks with a given tag was available; for instance, the URL http://delicious.com/tag/wiki displayed all of the most recent links tagged "wiki". Its collective nature made it possible to view bookmarks added by other users.

Delicious also allowed users to group links with similar topics together to form a "Stack", and include title and descriptions for the Stack page. Stacks could be worked on collaboratively with other users, and could be followed and shared with other users. Stacks were added in September 2011 and removed in July 2012.

Delicious had a "hotlist" on its home page and "recent" pages, which helped to make the website a conveyor of Internet memes and trends. Users could also explore stacks on the home page by navigating categories such as Arts & Design or Education.

All bookmarks posted to Delicious were publicly viewable by default, although users could mark specific bookmarks as private, and imported bookmarks were private by default. The public aspect was emphasized; the site was not focused on storing private ("not shared") bookmark collections. Delicious linkrolls, tagrolls, network badges, RSS feeds, and the site's daily blog posting feature could be used to display bookmarks on weblogs.

== History ==
The old logo of Delicious

The precursor to Delicious was Muxway, a link blog that had grown out of a text file that Schachter maintained to keep track of links related to Memepool. In September 2003, Schachter released the first version of Delicious. In March 2005, he left his day job to work on Delicious full-time, and in April 2005 it received approximately $2 million in funding from investors including Union Square Ventures and Amazon.com.

When Delicious was first launched, it was the first use of the term "tag" in the modern sense, and it was the first explicit opportunity where website users were given the ability to add their own tags to their bookmarks so that they could more easily search for them at a later time. This major breakthrough was not much noticed as most thought the application at the time "cool" but obvious.

Yahoo acquired Delicious on December 9, 2005. Various guesses suggest it was sold for somewhere between US$15 million and US$30 million. In 2018, Schachter said the actual number was "definitely less" than US$30 million.

On December 16, 2010, an internal slide from a Yahoo meeting leaked, indicating that Delicious would be "sunsetted" in the future, which seemed to mean "shut down". Later Yahoo clarified that they would be selling Delicious, not ending it. This news resulted in Delicious users looking for alternative sites. This benefited Pinboard, also a bookmarking site, which saw a huge surge of traffic and activity on its site. Various other services such as Google Bookmarks and Spabba also offered bookmarks migration tools to allow users to migrate and safeguard their bookmarks out of Delicious.

On April 27, 2011, Delicious announced the site was sold to Avos Systems, a company created by Chad Hurley and Steve Chen. Unbeknownst to members, Yahoo continued to operate the site until September 2011.

On September 26, 2011, Delicious launched its completely new version 3.0 design in beta. This redesign came in as a surprise to many of its users, with many features being disabled, removed or temporarily unavailable. AVOS Systems removed the Delicious Support Forum and had advised users that communication with Avos should take place via email. Reaction from users was overwhelmingly negative.

On November 9, 2011, AVOS Systems announced that they had acquired the link-saving service, Trunk.ly. Trunk.ly offered to automatically save all links that users have "liked" on Facebook, Twitter and LinkedIn. This acquisition led to the launch of Twitter Connector on Delicious on March 2, 2012.

On May 8, 2014, Science, Inc. announced it had acquired the Delicious website from AVOS, without acquiring staff. Science, Inc. is a "technology investment and advisory firm", which said it intended to keep the site "largely as is".

On January 11, 2016, the Delicious blog announced ownership had transitioned to a new company formed between Science and of Domainersuite.

On June 1, 2017, Pinboard acquired Delicious. The service was shut down and became read-only on June 15, and its users have been encouraged to subscribe to the Pinboard service.

As of July 15, 2020, Maciej Ceglowski, owner of Pinboard, announced plans to restore the site to a explorable state and allow data export provided users have their login credentials.

=== Under Avos Systems ===
After being purchased by AVOS Systems on April 27, 2011, Delicious went through significant UI redesigns and became more social.

On September 26, 2011, Delicious launched its completely new version 3.0 design in beta. Delicious added a new feature called Stacks that allows users to group multiple related links into a single page, and customize the Stack by adding title, description and a featured image.

On December 13, 2011, Delicious continued its work to redesign its site, including UI changes to link-saving page and Stacks page. The new design, especially for the Stacks page, was similar to the design of another popular social photo-sharing website Pinterest.

On January 20, 2012, Delicious added more social features into its Stacks page, allowing users to collaborate on the same Stack, as a public Stack or a private Stack among a group of users. The users can also comment on a stack and create a stack as a response to the original stack. This new social feature was considered as a good step against competitor such as Pinterest which did not offer private boards at the time.

On March 2, 2012, Delicious continued its effort to be more social, by providing a Twitter Connector that allows users to connect their Twitter accounts to their Delicious accounts. This new feature allowed tweeted links to be automatically saved into the Delicious account.

On July 20, 2012, Delicious reversed its position on the Stacks feature. All Stacks created by members were converted to tags in early August, 2012, without any loss of member data. This was part in response to AVOS's direction for Delicious and partly from feedback from Delicious members, many of whom felt that Stacks were trying to emulate features of the visual bookmarking site, Pinterest.

== Name ==
The "del.icio.us" domain name was a well-known example of a domain hack, an unconventional combination of letters to form a word or phrase.

In an interview Schachter explained how he chose the name: "I'd registered the domain when .us opened the registry, and a quick test showed me the six letter suffixes that let me generate the most words. In early discussions, a friend referred to finding good links as 'eating cherries' and the metaphor stuck, I guess."

On September 6, 2007, Schachter announced the website's name would change to "Delicious" when the site would be redesigned. The new design went live on July 31, 2008, followed by the domain name moving to delicious.com. In January 2016, changes to the website were announced, including a move back to "del.icio.us".

On April 24, 2016, Delicious transitioned back to "del.icio.us".

== See also ==
- Web 2.0
