= List of mergers and acquisitions by Twitter, Inc. =

X Corp. is a technology company that owns the social networking and microblogging service X (formerly Twitter) since 2023 after the merger with the platform's owner, Twitter, Inc., which was acquired in 2022 by Elon Musk.

Registered users on X can send and read short posts (tweets), which are text messages limited to 280 characters, and can also repost (retweet) a post; but unregistered users can only read them. Users access X through the website interface or mobile device app.

== Acquisitions ==
Number	Date	Company	Business	Country	Price (USD)	Price Adjusted for Inflation (USD)	Category	Background information	References
1	July 15, 2008	Summize	Social search	US				Summize was a search engine founded by Jay Verdy. Using Twitter stock to fund the takeover, Twitter announced in July 2008 it had acquired Summize. Summize had six employees, all of whom joined Twitter except for Verdy. The month of the acquisition, Twitter changed both its page for real-time searches and its search API to use Summize's product. Wired said, "Summize is a natural fit for Twitter and should help the service be a little more approachable."	
2	November 24, 2008	Values of n	Social software development					Values of n was an information management software company founded by Rael Dornfest, who used to be O'Reilly Media's chief technology officer. I Want Sandy was an email app it created, while Stikkit was a virtual Post-it Note app it had released. It was an acqui-hire where Twitter wanted Dornfest, who for several months had been doing consulting for it, to join its user experience group. I Want Sandy and Stikkit were discontinued on December 8, 2008.	
3	December 23, 2009	Mixer labs	Location information engine		$5.17 million (in stock)	$7.8 million (in stock)		Mixer Labs was a San Mateo, California, company that made geolocation provider software called GeoAPI. It was founded in 2007 by Elad Gil and Othman Laraki, who had been former Google employees. Given a tweet's latitude and longitude, its reverse geocoding product would output what the nearest intersection, neighborhood, and city. Over 16 million companies used its product at the time of the acquisition. Twitter's aim with the acquisition was to enhance its geotagging API with GeoAPI features. Twitter paid for the acquisition using roughly $5 million of stock, and Mixer Lab employees were invited to become Twitter employees.	
4	April 9, 2010	Atebits	Tweetie	US			Mobile Twitter app (iOS)	Atebits was a company that made Tweetie, a Twitter client that supported the iOS and macOS platforms. It was established by former Apple Inc. iPhone software engineer Loren Brichter who became a Twitter employee following the acquisition. At the time of the acquisition could be purchased for $2.99 on the App Store. Renaming Tweetie to Twitter for iPhone, Twitter made the client free after acquiring Atebits. Fast Company called Tweetie "one of the best (if not the best) mobile Twitter app".	
5	April 23, 2010	Cloudhopper	Mobile messaging					Cloudhopper was a Seattle-based mobile messaging startup founded by Joe Lauer in 2008. Twitter announced in April 2010 that it was acquiring Cloudhopper. Both Lauer and Kristin Kanaar, the company's director of cloud integration, joined Twitter. In the eight months preceding the acquisition, Cloudhopper was working with Twitter on using SMS carriers. By purchasing Cloudhopper, Twitter aimed to bolster its SMS capabilities in managing the load from additional users who were globally distributed and numbering in the tens of millions.	
6	June 10, 2010	Smallthought Systems	Databases and analytics	Canada			Analytics tools	Smallthought Systems was a Vancouver-based database and analytics company based founded in 2005 by Avi Bryant, Andrew Catton, Ben Matasar, and Luke Andrews. Before the acquisition, Twitter had used its products including the project management tool Dabble DB and the Google Analytics data parser named Trendly. Twitter invited Smallthought, which had four employees at the time of the acquisition, to become Twitter employees.	
7	December 21, 2010	Fluther	Q&A service					Fluther was a crowdsourced Q&A software company founded by Ben Finkel in 2007. The website attempted to get questioners real-time answers and notify knowledgeable people of questions they likely could answer. It was an acqui-hire where Twitter invited four engineers and a designer to join the company to do content discovery work. It had one million monthly visitors and had received $600,000 in funding at the time of the acquisition. Although Twitter did not purchase the Flutter Q&A tool itself, Flutter would continue independently, have no more work done it, and would be supported by an online community manager.	
8	May 25, 2011	TweetDeck	Web and desktop client	US	$40 million	$57.2 million		TweetDeck was a software company founded by Ian Dodsworth in 2007 that made it easier for users to control their Twitter accounts. The company was based in London's Old Street. TweetDeck allows users to arrange their Twitter web feed based on chosen categories. TweetDeck would group the messages in columns on the page. Users could use the application to import data from Facebook and Myspace. Dodsworth announced on May 25, 2011, that Twitter would purchase TweetDeck for roughly £25 million (US$40 million). At the time of the acquisition, it employed 15 people who were largely based in the United Kingdom and was the second most common method to access Twitter through its 20 million downloads. The Independent said that Twitter, which had been unable to develop a good user interface, would be able to have one through TweetDeck. Another reason for the acquisition was that Twitter competitor UberMedia had been interested in acquiring TweetDeck, which Twitter wanted to prevent.	
9	June 1, 2011	AdGrok	Advertising					AdGrok was an ads bidding platform founded by Antonio García Martínez, Matthew McEachen, and Argyris Zymnis. AdGrok allowed Google AdWords users to make automatic bids for "contextual keywords". AdGrok announced on May 31, 2011, that Twitter had acquired it. TechCrunch reported that the acquisition price was slightly below $10 million. While co-founders McEachen and Zymnis joined Twitter, co-founder García Martínez joined Twitter rival the Facebook ads division as a product manager. AdGrok closed its service on June 30, 2011. VentureBeat said that AdGrok could help Twitter generate revenue from "promoted and trending tweets".	
10	July 5, 2011	BackType	Social analytics					BackType was a San Francisco-based social media analytics startup established in 2008. Through its product, customers can conduct queries and aggregations of many social media and blogging services. Twitter acquired BackType on July 5, 2011. VentureBeat said that Twitter likely was interested in the company because of its BackTweet service that provides tweet analytics for publishers. At the time of the acquisition, over 100 companies had been using BackType products, including The New York Times. The company had raised $1 million in funding. BackType employees were invited to join Twitter.	
11	August 8, 2011	Bagcheck	Social sharing and discovery					Bagcheck was a social sharing company founded by Sam Pullara and Luke Wroblewski. Pullara, Bagcheck's chief product officer, became a Twitter employee, while Wroblewski did not. The product had the concept of "bags" which means a selected group of items such as photography equipment. Through the platform, users could view and comment on others' bags and create their own bags. For every item in users' bags, Bagcheck has an e-commerce website link to enable users to make an identical purchase. VentureBeat suggested that Twitter purchased Bagcheck to contribute to its aim to make their own advertising platform.	
12	September 21, 2011	Julpan	Real-time social search engine					Julpan was a New York-based social media analysis company founded in 2010 by Ori Allon, who had previously sold a search algorithm he had created to Google. The company concentrates on examining social media posts through platforms such as Twitter so that it can show users the most pertinent and latest material. On September 21, 2011, Julpan said Twitter had acquired it. Allon became a Twitter engineering director, while Julpan's 12 employees were invited to become Twitter employees. The acquisition was for $40 million, and Twitter integrated Julpan's technology to allow users to find in real time tweets about the latest subject matter.	
13	November 28, 2011	Whisper Systems	Mobile privacy and security						
14	January 19, 2012	Summify	Social news						
15	January 24, 2012	Dasient	Internet security				Revenue team		
16	March 12, 2012	Posterous	Blogging platform						
17	April 16, 2012	Hotspots.io	Social media intelligence	US			Revenue engineering team		
18	May 10, 2012	RestEngine	Personalized email marketing	US					
19	June 4, 2012	Nclud	Boutique design agency						
20	August 13, 2012	Clutch.IO	A/B tester				Design		
21	October 9, 2012	Vine	Video sharing service		$30 million	$42.1 million			
22	October 16, 2012	Cabana	Mobile app building software						
23	January 28, 2013	Crashlytics	Crash reporting		$100 million+	$138.2 million+			
24	February 6, 2013	Bluefin Labs	Social TV analytics	US	$80 million	$110.6 million			
25	November 1, 2012	We Are Hunted	Music service	Australia					
26	May 9, 2013	Ubalo	Large-scale computing						
27	May 13, 2013	Lucky Sort	Big Data visualization						
28	June 19, 2013	Spindle Labs	Local discovery	US					
29	August 2, 2013	Locomatix		US					
30	August 13, 2013	Marakana	Training services						
31	August 28, 2013	Trendrr	Advertising solutions						
32	September 9, 2013	MoPub	Advertising solutions		$350 million	$483.8 million			
33	March 31, 2014	Mesagraph	Social TV	France					
34	March 31, 2014	SecondSync	Social TV	UK					
35	April 7, 2014	Cover	Android lockscreen app						
36	April 15, 2014	Gnip	Data reseller		$134 million	$182.2 million			
37	June 5, 2014	Namo Media	Native mobile advertising		$50 million	$68 million	MoPub		
38	June 5, 2014	TapCommerce	Mobile app install ads		$100 million	$136 million			
39	June 19, 2014	SnappyTV	Live clipping service						
40	July 29, 2014	CardSpring	Payment application platform				Commerce		
41	July 17, 2014	Madbits	Deep learning	US			Twitter Cortex		
42	August 1, 2014	Mitro	Password security						
43	October 25, 2014	Twitpic	Photo-sharing website						
44	January 20, 2015	ZipDial	Mobile marketing and analytics	India					
45	February 11, 2015	Niche	Advertising and software						
46	March 9, 2015	Periscope	Live-video streaming		$50–100 million	$67.9–135.8 million			
47	April 2, 2015	TenXer	Collaboration platform		under $50 million	under $67.9 million			
48	April 28, 2015	TellApart	Advertising		$479 million	$650.6 million			
49	June 17, 2015	Whetlab	Machine learning	US			Twitter Cortex		
50	October 21, 2015	Fastlane	Deployment services	Austria					
51	October 21, 2015	ZeroPush	Push notification services	US					
52	April 8, 2016	Peer	Employee and manager feedback tool	US					
53	June 20, 2016	Magic Pony Technology	Advanced video upscaling, compression and enhancement	UK	$150 million	$201.2 million			
54	December 1, 2016	Yes, Inc	Social apps developer	US					
55	June 21, 2018	Smyte	Spam & fraud prevention service	US	$65 million	$83.3 million			
56	April 17, 2019	Highly	Highlight sharing application						
57	June 3, 2019	Fabula AI	Geometric deep learning & fake-news detection	UK					
58	November 21, 2019	Aiden.ai	AI-powered digital marketing	UK					
59	February 19, 2020	Chroma Labs	Visual Stories App	US					
60	May 12, 2020	CrossInstall	Programmatic interactive mobile ads at scale	US					
61	December 14, 2020	Squad	Real-time social video	US				Squad was a technology startup providing live group video calling with cowatching. It was acquired by Twitter in December 2020. It was founded by Esther Crawford, Ethan Sutin, who raised $7.2 million in seed funding from investors that included Y Combinator, First Round Capital, and Betaworks. Squad's technology allowed users to view synchronized content during group video calls. Squad's core features will be integrated into the Twitter app.	
62	January 2021	Breaker	Social podcasting	US			Twitter Spaces		
63	January 6, 2021	Ueno	Creative agency						
64	January 25, 2021	DriveScale	Storage Technology	US					
65	January 26, 2021	Revue	Newsletter platform	Netherlands					
66	May 4, 2021	Scroll	Subscription Service for Ad-Free Browsing	US			Twitter Blue Longform		
67	October 20, 2021	Sphere	Group Chat App	UK					
68	November 15, 2021	Threader	Longform Reader Application	France			Twitter Blue		
69	April 12, 2022	OpenBack	Device-side Notifications Platform	Ireland	Not Disclosed	Not Disclosed	Notifications	OpenBack was a push notification platform founded by Christian Ryder, Nicolas Pabion and David Shackleton. The patented technology put privacy first by operating client-side on the users device.	
70	May 15, 2023	Laskie	Hiring platform	US				San Francisco-based startup founded in 2021 and focused on recruiting	

== See also ==
- List of mergers and acquisitions by Alphabet
- List of mergers and acquisitions by Apple
- List of mergers and acquisitions by IBM
- List of mergers and acquisitions by Meta Platforms
- List of mergers and acquisitions by Microsoft
- List of mergers and acquisitions by Yahoo!
- Mergers and acquisitions
