= Town School for Boys =

Coordinates: 37°47′30.67″N 122°26′24.42″W

Town School For Boys
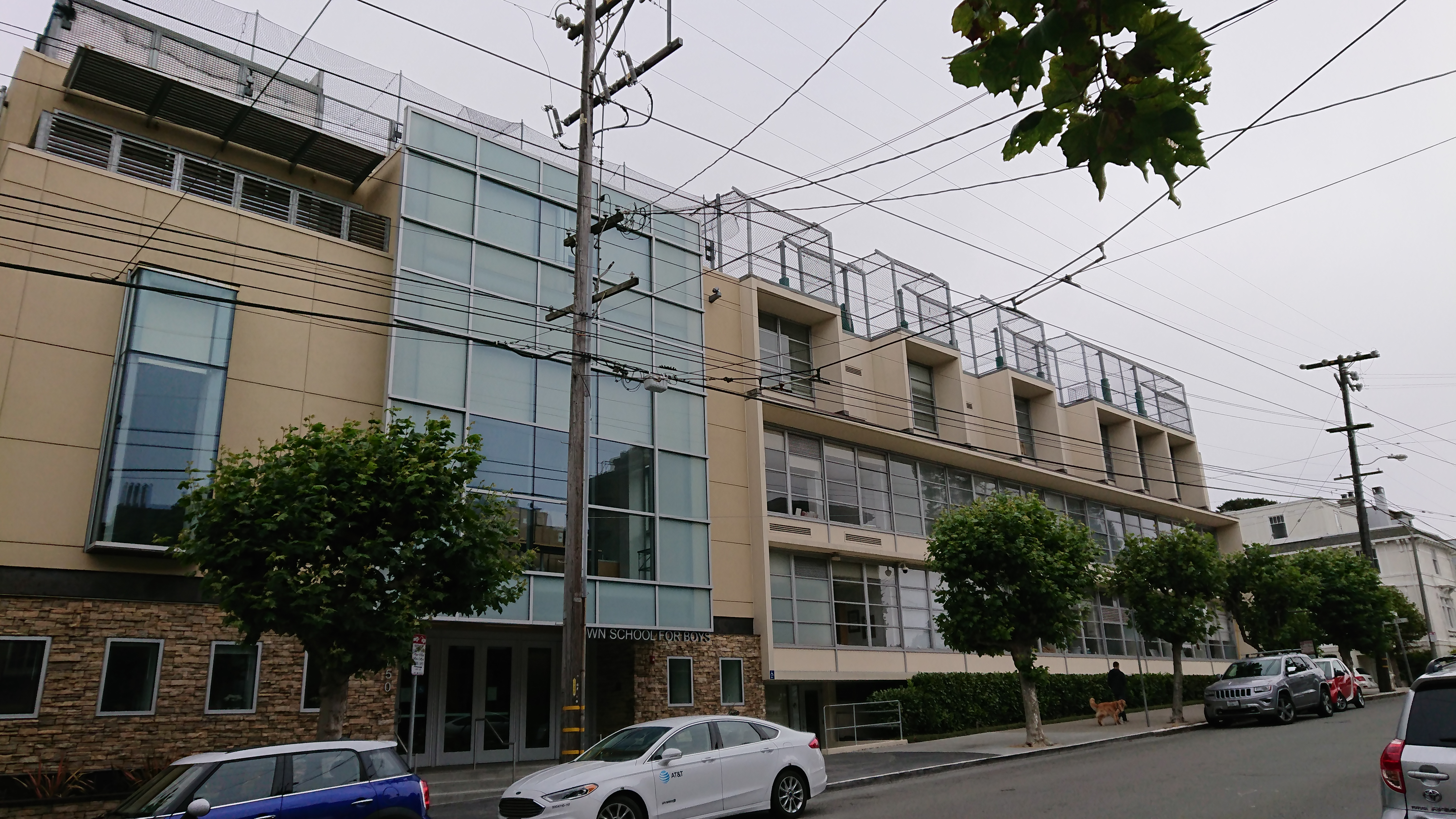

Location
- 2750 Jackson Street; San Francisco, CA; USA

Information
- Type: Private
- Established: 1939
- Head of School: Lorri Hamilton Durbin
- Faculty: 65
- Gender: All-male
- Enrollment: 400
- Student to teacher ratio: 11:1
- Colors: Blue and White
- Mascot: Town Tiger
- Website: www.townschool.com

Town School for Boys, located in San Francisco, California, is an independent day school for boys from kindergarten through the eighth grade.

The school was established in 1939 by parents from the recently closed and privately owned Damon School, and in 1938–39 was known as the Tamalpais Junior School. Town School for Boys is considered a college preparatory institution for boys in San Francisco. The school is well respected nationally, and has a thriving teacher training program called the New Teacher Institute, founded in 1990. The enrollment of over 400 boys is divided into 9 grades, K - 8, with two classes per grade.

While renovations took place in the 2013–14 school year, the school temporarily leased the space in the Palace of Fine Arts vacated by the Exploratorium.

== Governance ==
Town is governed by a board of trustees composed of parents, alumni, and other stakeholders.

== Notable alumni ==
- Alex Gansa, screenwriter and producer
- Andrew Getty, American oil heir, philanthropist
- Daniel Lurie, mayor of San Francisco
- Deke Sharon, American singer
- Ethan Canin, author, co-founder of the San Francisco Writers Grotto
- John Heinz, former US senator from Pennsylvania, heir to the Heinz family fortune
- Mark Pirie, New Zealand poet
- Ned Segal, former chief financial officer of Twitter
- Nick Traina, late lead singer for Link 80
- Ulrich Schmid-Maybach, real estate developer
