= 2024 San Francisco mayoral election =

- November 5, 2024
- Turnout: 78.93% (▲37.29 pp)
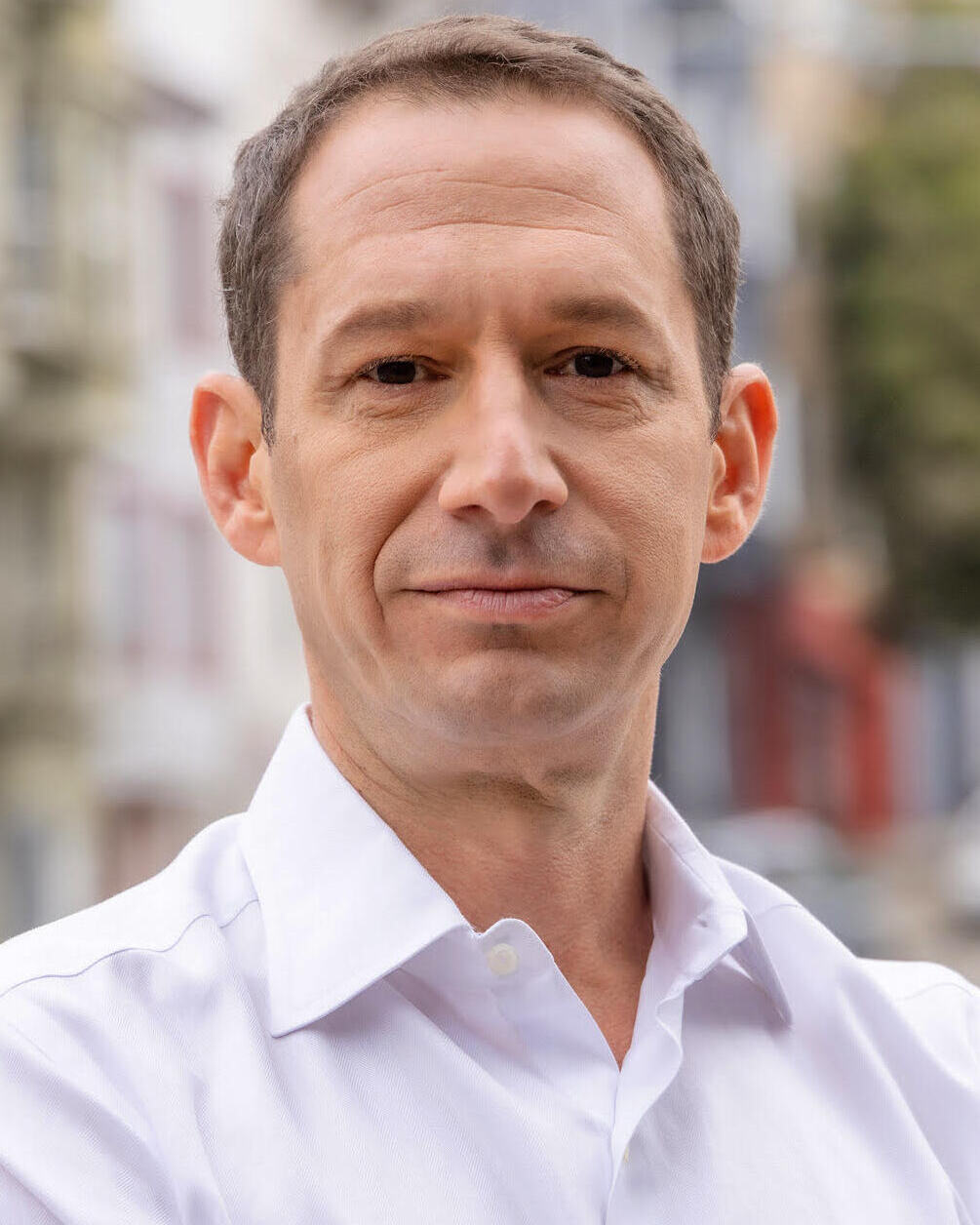

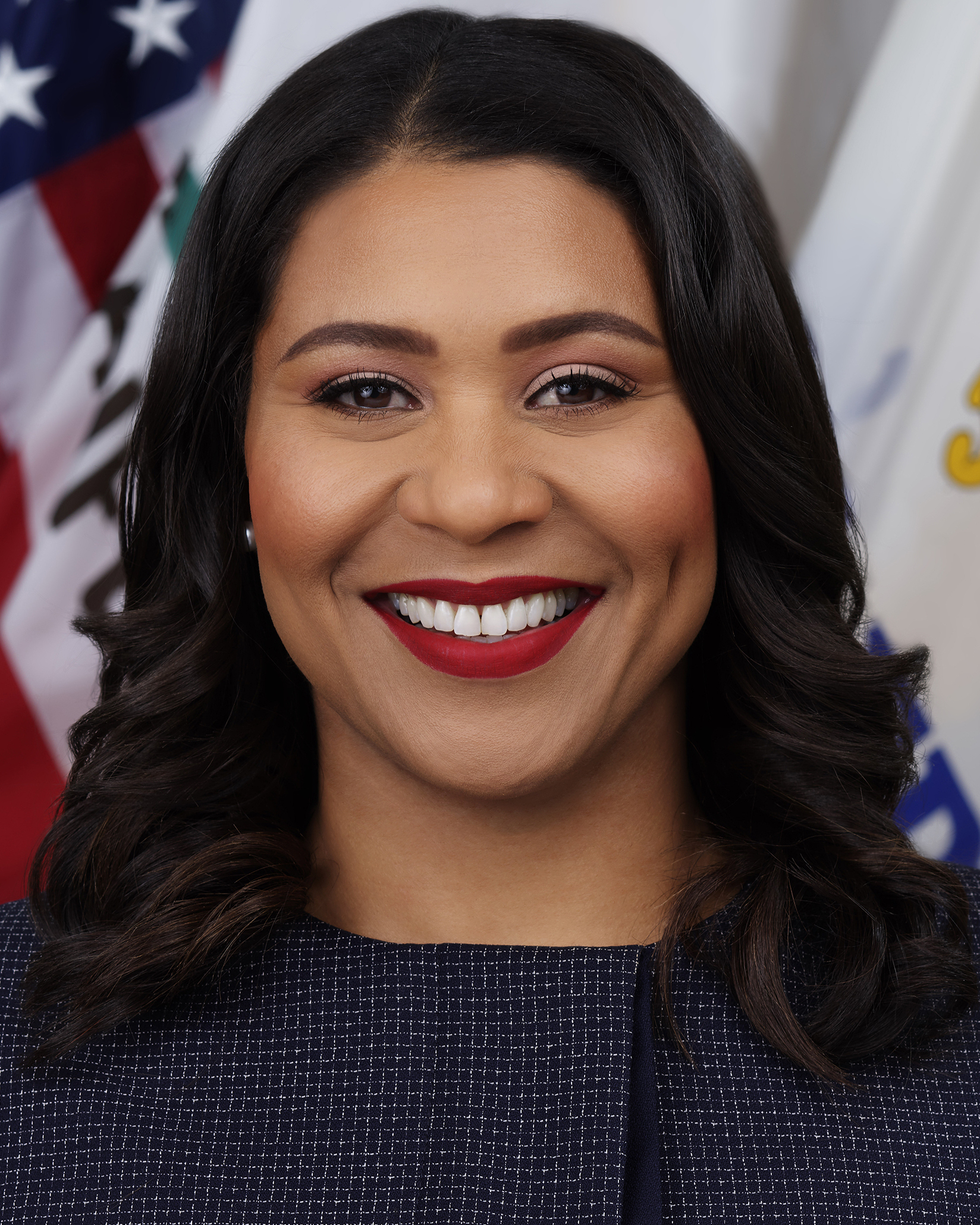

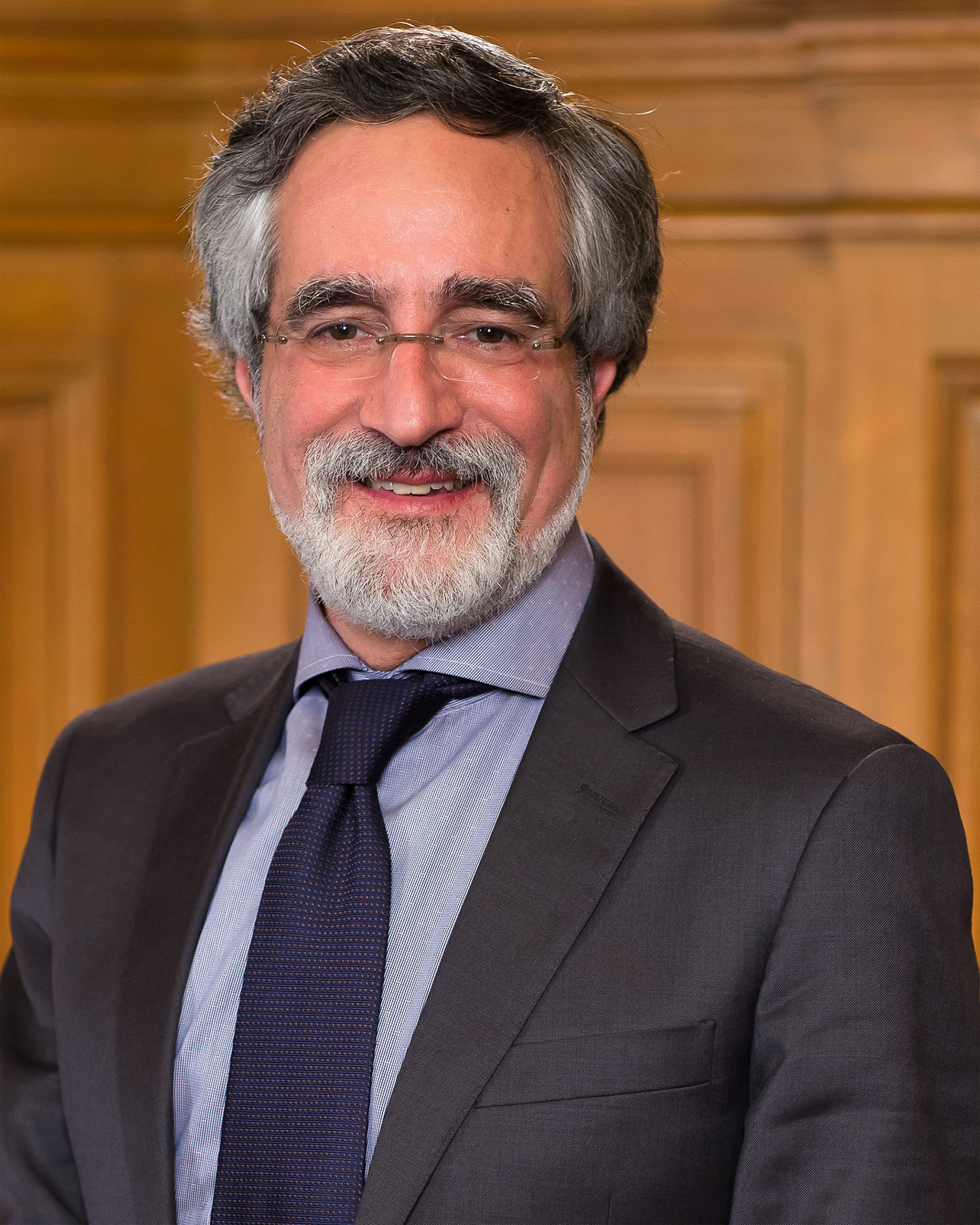

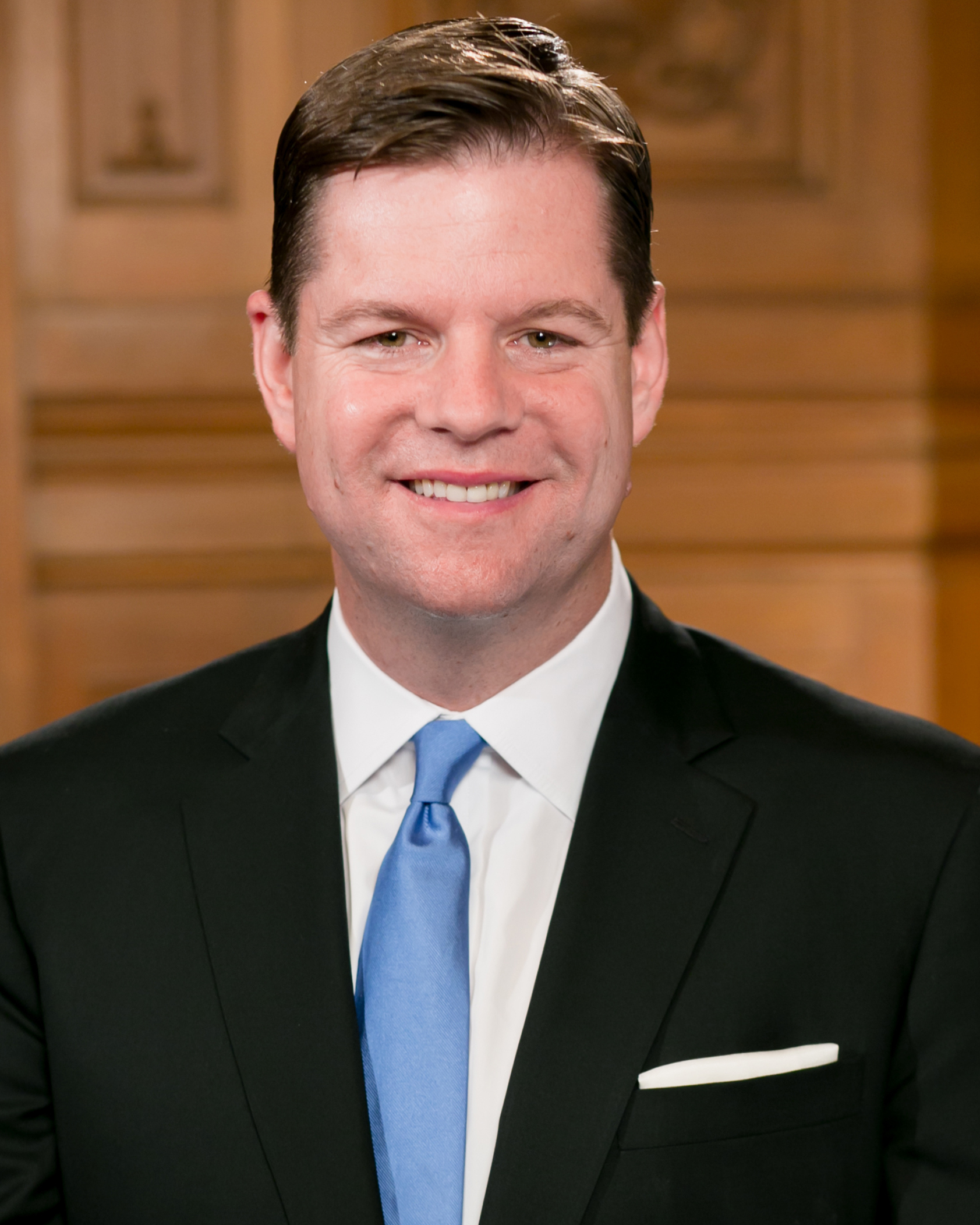
Candidate	Daniel Lurie	London Breed
First round	102,720; 26.33%	95,117; 24.38%
Maximum round	182,364; 55.02%	149,113; 44.98%
Candidate	Aaron Peskin	Mark Farrell
First round	89,215; 22.86%	72,115; 18.48%
Maximum round	Eliminated	Eliminated
- First round results by precinct
Mayor before election
London Breed
Democratic
Elected mayor
Daniel Lurie
Democratic

The 2024 San Francisco mayoral election took place on November 5, 2024, to elect the mayor of San Francisco, California. It was originally scheduled for November 7, 2023, but following the passage of Proposition H in 2022, mayoral elections were rescheduled to coincide with presidential elections. The election used ranked-choice voting.

Incumbent mayor London Breed ran for re-election to a second term in office; she was considered vulnerable, as polls had consistently shown her with low approval ratings. Breed had also faced criticism for her handling of important issues in the city, including homelessness, crime, and drug addiction.

On November 7, Breed conceded the race to Daniel Lurie.

== Background ==
A survey was released by the San Francisco Controller in 2023 which reported the lowest safety rating since 1996, and the lowest government rating since 2002. Polling in June reported that 64% of people did not believe London Breed should be reelected and she had a 66% disapproval rating.

== Candidates ==
- London Breed, incumbent mayor
- Mark Farrell, former San Francisco supervisor from the 2nd district and former interim mayor
- Henry Flynn, security guard
- Keith Freedman, teacher
- Dylan Hirsch-Shell, engineer
- Daniel Lurie, founder and former CEO of Tipping Point Community
- Nelson Mei, software engineer
- Aaron Peskin, president of the San Francisco Board of Supervisors
- Paul Robertson, teacher and candidate for mayor in 2019
- Ahsha Safaí, San Francisco supervisor from 11th district
- Shahram Shariati, transportation engineer
- Jon Soderstrom, tour guide
- Ellen Lee Zhou, social worker and candidate for mayor in 2018 and 2019

== Debates and forums ==
2024 San Francisco mayoral election debates and forums
Date	Host	Moderator(s)	Link	Participants				
Key: P Participant A Absent N Non-invitee W Withdrawn								
Key: P Participant A Absent N Non-invitee W Withdrawn				London Breed	Mark Farrell	Daniel Lurie	Aaron Peskin	Ahsha Safaí
May 20, 2024 (cancelled)	TogetherSF Action	Karen Breslau; Kim-Mai Cutler		W	A	W	W	A
June 12, 2024	City Arts & Lectures	Heather Knight; Manny Yekutiel	Video	P	P	P	P	P
June 17, 2024	San Francisco; Democratic Party	Terisa Estacio		P	P	P	P	P
July 8, 2024	Stop Crime Action; Stop Crime SF; ConnectedSF	Frank Noto; Amber Lee		P	P	P	A	P
Sept. 5, 2024	District 8 Neighborhood Groups	Joe Fitzgerald Rodriguez	Video	A	P	P	P	P
Sept. 11, 2024	KPIX; San Francisco Examiner; KCBS	Ryan Yamamoto; Doug Sovereign; Adam Shanks		A	P	P	P	P
Sept. 19, 2024	KQED; San Francisco Chronicle	Joe Garofoli; Marisa Lagos; Scott Shafer	Video	P	P	P	P	P
Sept. 26, 2024	Asian Pacific Islander Council	Richard Lui; Gia Vang		P	P	P	P	P
Sept. 28, 2024	San Francisco Latino Parity and Equity Coalition	Chris Iglesias; Ani Rivera		P	A	P	P	P
Sept. 30, 2024	League of Women Voters of San Francisco	Alison Goh; Darcy Brown	Video	A	P	P	P	P

== Endorsements ==
London Breed

State legislators

- Scott Wiener, state senator

Local officials

- Michela Alioto-Pier, former San Francisco supervisor
- Willie Brown, former mayor of San Francisco (1996–2004)
- Matt Dorsey, San Francisco supervisor
- Joel Engardio, San Francisco supervisor
- Brooke Jenkins, San Francisco district attorney
- Jane Kim, former San Francisco supervisor
- Rafael Mandelman, San Francisco supervisor
- Paul Miyamoto, San Francisco Sheriff
- Mano Raju, San Francisco public defender
- Hillary Ronen, San Francisco supervisor
- Catherine Stefani, San Francisco supervisor
- Shamann Walton, San Francisco supervisor

Individuals

- Michael Bloomberg, former mayor of New York City (2002-2013)
- Danny Glover, actor
- Dolores Huerta, co-founder of United Farm Workers

Political parties

- San Francisco Democratic Party

Organizations

- Alice B. Toklas LGBTQ Democratic Club
- Black Women Organized for Political Action
- Eastern Neighborhoods Democratic Club
- Edwin M. Lee Asian Pacific Democratic Club
- EMILY's List
- Everytown for Gun Safety
- GrowSF
- MomsRising
- Planned Parenthood
- San Francisco Bicycle Coalition
- San Francisco League of Conservation Voters
- San Francisco Police Officers Association
- San Francisco Women's Political Committee
- San Francisco YIMBY Action
- San Francisco Young Democrats
- United Democratic Club

Labor unions

- District Council of Plasterers & Cement Masons Northern California (OPCMIA Local 300)
- International Alliance of Theatrical Stage Employees Local 16
- International Brotherhood of Teamsters Local 350
- International Brotherhood of Teamsters Local 665
- International Longshore and Warehouse Union Local 10
- International Union of Operating Engineers Local 3
- Laborers' International Union of North America Local 261
- Service Employees International Union Local 2015
- United Brotherhood of Carpenters (Nor Cal Carpenters Union)

Editorial boards

- Bay Area Reporter editorial board
Mark Farrell

Local officials

- Catherine Stefani, San Francisco supervisor

Organizations

- Edwin M. Lee Asian Pacific Democratic Club
- GrowSF
- San Francisco Chinese American Democratic Club
- TogetherSF Action

Labor unions

- Floorcoverers Local 12
- International Association of Sheet Metal, Air, Rail and Transportation Workers (SMART) Local 104
- International Brotherhood of Electrical Workers Local 6
- International Union of Elevator Constructors Local 8
- Painters and Drywall Finishers Local 913
- Plumbers, Steamfitters, HVACR Local 38
- San Francisco Building and Construction Trades Council
- San Francisco Deputy Sheriffs' Association
- San Francisco Fire Fighters (IAFF Local 798)
Daniel Lurie

Local officials

- Matt Gonzalez, former president of the San Francisco Board of Supervisors and running mate of Ralph Nader in the 2008 presidential election (second choice)
- Frank Jordan, former mayor of San Francisco (1992–1996)
- Vicki Hennessy, Former Sheriff of San Francisco & Former Director of Emergency Management
- Angela Alioto, Former President, San Francisco Board of Supervisors

Individuals

- Nadine Burke Harris, First California Surgeon General
- Ned Segal, Former CFO of Twitter
- Marissa Mayer, Former CEO of Yahoo!
- Dan Goldman, NY-10 Congressman

Organizations

- GrowSF
- ConnectedSF
- San Francisco Association of Realtors

Labor unions

- LiUNA! Local 261
- United Food and Commercial Workers Local 648

Editorial boards

- San Francisco Chronicle editorial board
Aaron Peskin

State legislators

- Phil Ting, state Assembly member
- Mark Leno, former state senator

Local officials

- Art Agnos, former mayor of San Francisco (1988-1992)
- Connie Chan, San Francisco supervisor
- Matt Gonzalez, former president of the San Francisco Board of Supervisors and running mate of Ralph Nader in the 2008 presidential election (first choice)
- Jane Kim, former San Francisco supervisor
- Hillary Ronen, San Francisco supervisor
- Shamann Walton, San Francisco supervisor

Individuals

- Dolores Huerta, co-founder of the United Farm Workers

Political parties

- San Francisco Green Party

Organizations

- California Working Families Party
- Harvey Milk LGBTQ Democratic Club
- San Francisco Berniecrats
- San Francisco Affordable Housing Alliance

Labor unions

- American Federation of Teachers Local 2121
- California Nurses Association
- International Brotherhood of Teamsters Local 863
- International Brotherhood of Teamsters Local 2785
- National Union of Healthcare Workers
- Service Employees International Union Local 1021
- United Educators of San Francisco
- UNITE HERE Local 2
- UPTE-CWA 9119
Ahsha Safaí

Local officials

- Paul Miyamoto, San Francisco Sherriff
- Fiona Ma, State Treasurer of California (second choice)

Labor unions

- American Federation of Teachers Local 2121
- Carpet, Linoleum, and Soft Tile Workers Local 12
- International Association of Sheet Metal, Air, Rail and Transportation Workers (SMART) Local 104
- International Union of Elevator Constructors Local 8
- Iron Workers Local 377
- Painters and Drywall Finishers Local 913
- Plumbers, Steamfitters, HVACR Local 38
- San Francisco Deputy Sheriffs' Association
- San Francisco Building and Construction Trades Council
- Service Employees International Union Local 87
- Sprinkle Fitters Local 483
- Teamsters Local 2785
- United Educators of San Francisco
- United Food and Commercial Workers Local 5, 648

== Polling ==
Poll source	Date(s) administered	Sample size (Note: Key: A – all adults RV – registered voters LV – likely voters V – unclear)	Margin of error	RCV round	London Breed	Mark Farrell	Daniel Lurie	Aaron Peskin	Ahsha Safaí	Other	Undecided
David Binder Research (Note: Poll sponsored by Lurie's campaign)	October 26–27, 2024	600 (LV)	± 4%	–	23%	17%	26%	18%	4%	5%	7%
Public Policy Polling (Note: Poll sponsored by Peskin's campaign)	October 18–19, 2024	621 (LV)	± 4%	–	18%	15%	25%	25%	–	6%	11%
Sextant Strategies & Research (Note: Poll sponsored by the San Francisco Chronicle)	October 15–16, 2024	802 (LV)	± 3.5%	1	27%	16%	27%	21%	6%	3%	–
Sextant Strategies & Research	October 15–16, 2024	802 (LV)	± 3.5%	2	27%	17%	27%	22%	7%	–	–
Sextant Strategies & Research	October 15–16, 2024	802 (LV)	± 3.5%	3	30%	18%	28%	24%	–	–	–
Sextant Strategies & Research	October 15–16, 2024	802 (LV)	± 3.5%	4	33%	–	41%	26%	–	–	–
Sextant Strategies & Research	October 15–16, 2024	802 (LV)	± 3.5%	5	44%	–	56%	–	–	–	–
Lieberman Data & Insights, Inc. (Note: Poll sponsored by TogetherSF Action, which endorsed Farrell)	October 9–19, 2024	950 (LV)	± 3.2%	1	25%	21%	21%	20%	3%	4%	6%
David Binder Research	September 28 – October 1, 2024	600 (LV)	± 4.4%	1	23%	19%	22%	16%	4%	6%	10%
David Binder Research	September 28 – October 1, 2024	600 (LV)	± 4.4%	2	27%	23%	27%	18%	5%	–	–
David Binder Research	September 28 – October 1, 2024	600 (LV)	± 4.4%	3	29%	24%	28%	20%	–	–	–
David Binder Research	September 28 – October 1, 2024	600 (LV)	± 4.4%	4	37%	27%	36%	–	–	–	–
David Binder Research	September 28 – October 1, 2024	600 (LV)	± 4.4%	5	47%	–	53%	–	–	–	–
FM3 Research (D) (Note: Poll sponsored by GrowSF)	September 21–26, 2024	415 (RV)	± 4.9%	1	38%	19%	21%	18%	4%	–	11%
FM3 Research (D)	September 21–26, 2024	415 (RV)	± 4.9%	2	39%	19%	21%	21%	–	–	–
FM3 Research (D)	September 21–26, 2024	415 (RV)	± 4.9%	3	43%	–	34%	23%	–	–	–
FM3 Research (D)	September 21–26, 2024	415 (RV)	± 4.9%	4	51%	–	49%	–	–	–	–
David Binder Research	September 3–8, 2024	800 (LV)	± 4.0%	1	26%	28%	26%	14%	6%	–	–
David Binder Research	September 3–8, 2024	800 (LV)	± 4.0%	2	27%	29%	28%	16%	–	–	–
David Binder Research	September 3–8, 2024	800 (LV)	± 4.0%	3	33%	33%	34%	–	–	–	–
David Binder Research	September 3–8, 2024	800 (LV)	± 4.0%	4	43%	–	57%	–	–	–	–
KRON4/Emerson College	September 5–7, 2024	750 (LV)	± 3.5%	1	20.3%	20.6%	17.5%	8.5%	1.6%	–	26.5%
FM3 Research (D)	August 21–28, 2024	708 (LV)	± 4.0%	1	36%	23%	22%	14%	5%	–	–
FM3 Research (D)	August 21–28, 2024	708 (LV)	± 4.0%	2	38%	23%	23%	15%	–	–	–
FM3 Research (D)	August 21–28, 2024	708 (LV)	± 4.0%	3	44%	27%	28%	–	–	–	–
FM3 Research (D)	August 21–28, 2024	708 (LV)	± 4.0%	4	52%	–	48%	–	–	–	–
Probolsky Research (Note: Poll sponsored by the San Francisco Deputy Sheriff’s Association)	July 30–August 7, 2024	300 (RV)	± 5.8%	1	28%	24%	19%	22%	3%	–	–
Probolsky Research	July 30–August 7, 2024	300 (RV)	± 5.8%	2	28%	24%	19%	22%	3%	–	–
Probolsky Research	July 30–August 7, 2024	300 (RV)	± 5.8%	3	29%	24%	20%	22%	3%	–	–
Probolsky Research	July 30–August 7, 2024	300 (RV)	± 5.8%	4	30%	25%	20%	22%	3%	–	–
Probolsky Research	July 30–August 7, 2024	300 (RV)	± 5.8%	5	30%	26%	21%	23%	–	–	–
Probolsky Research	July 30–August 7, 2024	300 (RV)	± 5.8%	6	36%	36%	–	28%	–	–	–
Probolsky Research	July 30–August 7, 2024	300 (RV)	± 5.8%	7	51%	49%	–	–	–	–	–
Sextant Strategies & Research	July 31 – August 5, 2024	804 (LV)	± 3.5%	–	28%	20%	17%	12%	5%	–	18%
FM3 Research (D)	July 9–18, 2024	1066 (LV)	± 3.1%	BA (Note: With undecideds)	24%	21%	16%	14%	7%	–	18%
FM3 Research (D)	July 9–18, 2024	1066 (LV)	± 3.1%	1	30%	26%	20%	16%	8%	–	–
FM3 Research (D)	July 9–18, 2024	1066 (LV)	± 3.1%	2	33%	27%	21%	19%	–	–	–
FM3 Research (D)	July 9–18, 2024	1066 (LV)	± 3.1%	3	41%	32%	26%	–	–	–	–
FM3 Research (D)	July 9–18, 2024	1066 (LV)	± 3.1%	4	51%	49%	–	–	–	–	–
Impact Research (D) (Note: Poll sponsored by Farrell's campaign)	June 1–6, 2024	500 (LV)	± 4.5%	BA	21%	23%	20%	17%	4%	5%	11%
Impact Research (D)	June 1–6, 2024	500 (LV)	± 4.5%	5	43%	57%	–	–	–	–	–
FM3 Research (D) (Note: Poll sponsored by Neighbors for San Francisco, which endorsed Farrell and Lurie)	May 10–16, 2024	866 (LV)	± 3.5%	BA	19%	20%	17%	12%	4%	1%	28%
FM3 Research (D)	May 10–16, 2024	866 (LV)	± 3.5%	5	45%	55%	–	–	–	–	–
FM3 Research (D)	April 29–May 5, 2024	412 (RV)	± 4.9%	BA	21%	16%	16%	12%	7%	–	28%
FM3 Research (D)	April 29–May 5, 2024	412 (RV)	± 4.9%	1	29%	23%	23%	16%	9%	–	–
FM3 Research (D)	April 29–May 5, 2024	412 (RV)	± 4.9%	2	30%	26%	24%	20%	–	–	–
FM3 Research (D)	April 29–May 5, 2024	412 (RV)	± 4.9%	3	39%	31%	30%	–	–	–	–
FM3 Research (D)	April 29–May 5, 2024	412 (RV)	± 4.9%	4	51%	49%	–	–	–	–	–
Probolsky Research	June 16–20, 2023	300 (RV)	± 5.8%	–	26%	–	–	–	29%	–	45%
Sextant Strategies & Research	February 14–18, 2024	812 (LV)	± 3.4%	–	18%	20%	16%	–	8%	–	38%
David Binder Research (D)	January 15–20, 2024	600 (LV)	± 4.0%	–	26%	15%	21%	–	10%	–	28%

== Results ==
2024 San Francisco mayoral election
Candidate	Maximum round	Maximum votes	Share in maximum round	Maximum votes First round votesTransfer votes
Daniel Lurie	14	182,364	55.0%	
London Breed (incumbent)	14	149,113	45.0%	
Aaron Peskin	13	104,279	28.3%	
Mark Farrell	12	78,878	20.5%	
Ahsha Safaí	11	13,618	3.5%	
Ellen Lee Zhou	10	10,094	2.6%	
Dylan Hirsch-Shell	9	3,939	1.0%	
Keith Freedman	8	2,539	0.7%	
Nelson Mei	7	2,043	0.5%	
Shahram Shariati	6	1,731	0.4%	
Henry Flynn	5	1,385	0.4%	
Paul Ybarra Robertson	4	838	0.2%	
Jon Soderstrom	3	412	0.1%	
Marc Roth	2	3	0.0%	
Michael Lin	1	1	0.0%	

2024 San Francisco Mayoral Election Ranked-Choice-Voting Round-by-Round Results
Candidate	Round 1			Round 2			Round 3			Round 4			Round 5			Round 6			Round 7			Round 8			Round 9			Round 10			Round 11			Round 12			Round 13			Round 14	
Candidate	Votes	%	Transfer	Votes	%	Transfer	Votes	%	Transfer	Votes	%	Transfer	Votes	%	Transfer	Votes	%	Transfer	Votes	%	Transfer	Votes	%	Transfer	Votes	%	Transfer	Votes	%	Transfer	Votes	%	Transfer	Votes	%	Transfer	Votes	%	Transfer	Votes	%
Daniel Lurie	102,720	26.33%	+1	102,721	26.33%	+1	102,722	26.33%	+29	102,751	26.34%	+62	102,813	26.36%	+138	102,951	26.41%	+163	103,114	26.46%	+148	103,262	26.52%	+439	103,701	26.66%	+754	104,455	26.89%	+2,291	106,746	27.65%	+2,616	109,362	28.46%	+41,233	150,595	40.84%	+31,769	182,364	55.02%
London Breed (incumbent)	95,117	24.38%	0	95,117	24.38%	0	95,117	24.38%	+21	95,138	24.39%	+64	95,202	24.41%	+91	95,293	24.45%	+221	95,514	24.51%	+147	95,661	24.57%	+236	95,897	24.65%	+570	96,467	24.84%	+854	97,321	25.21%	+2,591	99,912	26.00%	+13,953	113,865	30.88%	+35,248	149,113	44.98%
Aaron Peskin	89,215	22.86%	0	89,215	22.86%	0	89,215	22.86%	+25	89,240	22.87%	+133	89,373	22.92%	+125	89,498	22.96%	+150	89,648	23.01%	+216	89,864	23.08%	+234	90,098	23.16%	+712	90,810	23.38%	+1,209	92,019	23.84%	+4,054	96,073	25.00%	+8,206	104,279	28.28%	-104,279		
Mark Farrell	72,115	18.48%	0	72,115	18.48%	0	72,115	18.48%	+41	72,156	18.50%	+103	72,259	18.53%	+309	72,568	18.62%	+148	72,716	18.66%	+189	72,905	18.72%	+533	73,438	18.88%	+608	74,046	19.06%	+2,292	76,338	19.77%	+2,540	78,878	20.53%	-78,878					
Ahsha Safaí	11,425	2.93%	0	11,425	2.93%	0	11,425	2.93%	+29	11,454	2.94%	+36	11,490	2.95%	+64	11,554	2.96%	+390	11,944	3.07%	+98	12,042	3.09%	+150	12,192	3.13%	+364	12,556	3.23%	+1,062	13,618	3.53%	-13,618								
Ellen Lee Zhou	8,665	2.22%	0	8,665	2.22%	0	8,665	2.22%	+49	8,714	2.23%	+56	8,770	2.25%	+103	8,873	2.28%	+188	9,061	2.33%	+389	9,450	2.43%	+299	9,749	2.51%	+345	10,094	2.60%	-10,094											
Dylan Hirsch-Shell	2,897	0.74%	0	2,897	0.74%	+1	2,898	0.74%	+27	2,925	0.75%	+41	2,966	0.76%	+86	3,052	0.78%	+133	3,185	0.82%	+440	3,625	0.93%	+314	3,939	1.01%	-3,939														
Keith Freedman	2,079	0.53%	0	2,079	0.53%	0	2,079	0.53%	+42	2,121	0.54%	+59	2,180	0.56%	+149	2,329	0.60%	+77	2,406	0.62%	+133	2,539	0.65%	-2,539																	
Nelson Mei	1,791	0.46%	0	1,791	0.46%	0	1,791	0.46%	+18	1,809	0.46%	+65	1,874	0.48%	+74	1,948	0.50%	+95	2,043	0.52%	-2,043																				
Shahram Shariati	1,613	0.41%	0	1,613	0.41%	0	1,613	0.41%	+11	1,624	0.42%	+43	1,667	0.43%	+64	1,731	0.44%	-1,731																							
Henry Flynn	1,319	0.34%	0	1,319	0.34%	0	1,319	0.34%	+34	1,353	0.35%	+32	1,385	0.36%	-1,385																										
Paul Ybarra Robertson	812	0.21%	0	812	0.21%	0	812	0.21%	+26	838	0.21%	-838																													
Jon Soderstrom	412	0.11%	0	412	0.11%	0	412	0.11%	-412																																
Marc Roth	3	0.00%	0	3	0.00%	-3																																			
Michael Lin	1	0.00%	-1																																						
Continuing Votes Total	390,184			390,184			390,183			390,123			389,979			389,797			389,631			389,348			389,014			388,428			386,042			384,225			368,739			331,477	
Exhausted Ballots	0		0	0		+1	1		+52	53		+133	186		+170	356		+152	508		+260	768		+314	1,082		+546	1,628		+2,328	3,956		+1,734	5,690		+15,235	20,925		+36,934	57,859	
Over Votes	1,381		0	1,381		0	1,381		+8	1,389		+11	1,400		+12	1,412		+14	1,426		+23	1,449		+40	1,509		+58	1,567		+83	1,650		+251	1,901		+328	2,229				
Under Votes	18,540		0	18,540		0	18,540		0	18,540		0	18,540		0	18,540		0	18,540		0	18,540		0	18,540		0	18,540		0	18,540		0	18,540		0	18,540		0	18,540	
Non-Transferable Total	19,921			19,921			19,922			19,982			20,126			20,308			20,474			20,757			21,091			21,677			24,063			25,880			41,366			78,628	

== Notes ==
Partisan Clients
