= Twitter, Inc. =

American social media company (2006–2023)

- Logo used from 2012 to 2023

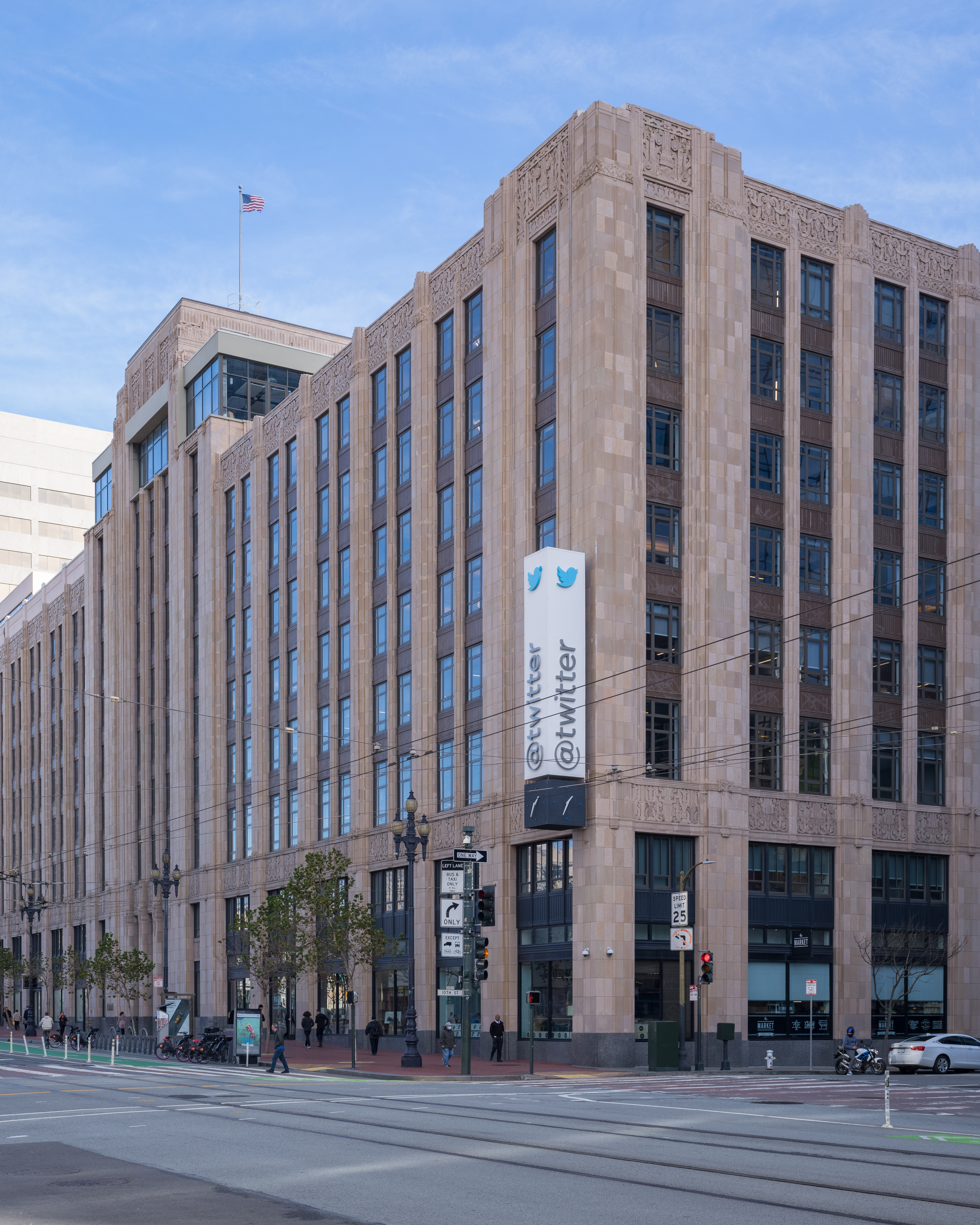
- Market Square, the company's headquarters in San Francisco, January 2023
- Type: Private (2007–2013, 2022–2023); Public (2013–2022)
- Traded as: NYSE: TWTR (2013–2022); S&P 500 component (2018–2022)
- Industry: Social media
- Predecessor: Obvious Corporation
- Founded: April 2007; 19 years ago
- Founders: Jack Dorsey; Noah Glass; Biz Stone; Evan Williams
- Defunct: April 4, 2023; 3 years ago (Note: In an April 4, 2023, court filing, Twitter, Inc. disclosed that it no longer existed and was consolidated into X Corp.)
- Fate: Merged with X Corp.
- Successor: X Corp.
- Headquarters: San Francisco, California, United States
- Area served: Worldwide
- Services: Twitter (rebranded to X); Vine (discontinued); Periscope (discontinued)
- Revenue: ▲US$5.1 billion (2021)
- Operating income: ▼US$−493 million (2021)
- Net income: ▲US$−221 million (2021)
- Total assets: ▲US$14.1 billion (2021)
- Total equity: ▼US$7.3 billion (2021)
- Number of employees: c. 1,000 (2023)
- ASN: 13414
- Website: about.twitter.com at the Wayback Machine (archived 2022-10-24)

Twitter, Inc. was an American social media company based in San Francisco, California, which operated and was named for its flagship social media network of the same name. In addition to Twitter, the company previously operated the Vine short video app and Periscope livestreaming service. In April 2023, Twitter merged with X Holdings and ceased to be an independent company, becoming a part of X Corp.

Twitter was created by Jack Dorsey, Noah Glass, Biz Stone, and Evan Williams in March 2006 and was later launched on July of the same year. By 2012, more than 100 million users tweeted 340 million tweets a day. The company went public in November 2013. By 2019, Twitter had more than 330 million monthly active users.

== History ==
=== 2006–2007: Creation and initial reaction ===
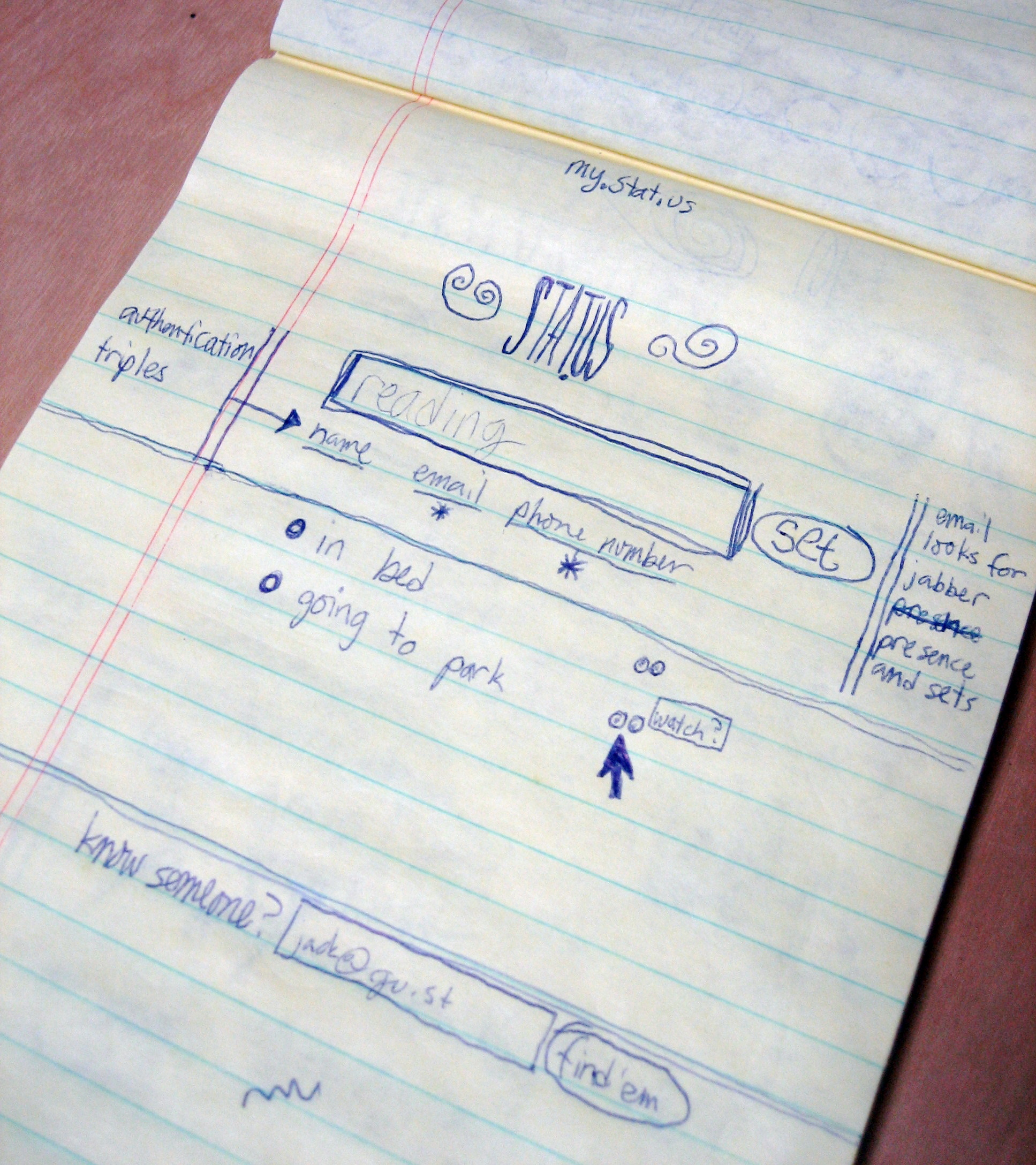
A sketch, c. 2006, by Jack Dorsey, envisioning an SMS-based social network

Twitter's origins lie in a "daylong brainstorming session" held by board members of the podcasting company Odeo. Jack Dorsey, then an undergraduate student at New York University, introduced the idea of an individual using an SMS service to communicate with a small group. Work on the project started in February 2006. Dorsey published the first Twitter message on March 21, 2006, at 12:50 p.m. PST (UTC−08:00): "just setting up my twttr". The first Twitter prototype, developed by Dorsey and contractor Florian Weber, was used as an internal service for Odeo employees. The full version was introduced publicly on July 15, 2006. In October 2006, Biz Stone, Evan Williams, Dorsey, and other members of Odeo formed Obvious Corporation and acquired Odeo, together with its assets—including Odeo.com and Twitter.com—from the investors and shareholders. Williams fired Glass, who was silent about his part in Twitter's startup until 2011. Twitter spun off into its own company in April 2007.

The tipping point for Twitter's popularity was the 2007 South by Southwest Interactive (SXSWi) conference. During the event, Twitter usage increased from 20,000 tweets per day to 60,000. "The Twitter people cleverly placed two 60-inch plasma screens in the conference hallways, exclusively streaming Twitter messages," remarked Newsweek's Steven Levy. "Hundreds of conference-goers kept tabs on each other via constant twitters. Panelists and speakers mentioned the service, and the bloggers in attendance touted it." Reaction at the conference was highly positive. Blogger Scott Beale said that Twitter was "absolutely ruling" SXSWi. Social software researcher danah boyd said Twitter was "owning" the conference.

=== 2007–2022: Growth ===
In April 2012, Twitter announced that it was opening an office in Detroit, with the aim of working with automotive brands and advertising agencies. Twitter also expanded its office in Dublin. Twitter hit 100 million monthly active users in September 2011. On December 18, 2012, Twitter announced it had surpassed 200 million monthly active users.

The company had its initial public offering on the New York Stock Exchange on November 7, 2013.

In September 2016, Twitter shares rose 20% after a report that it had received takeover approaches. Potential buyers were Alphabet (the parent company of Google), Microsoft, Salesforce.com, Verizon, and The Walt Disney Company. Twitter's board of directors were open to a deal, which could have come by the end of 2016. However, no deal was made, with reports in October stating that all the potential buyers dropped out partly due to concerns over abuse and harassment on the service. In 2017, Twitter revamped its dashboard to improve the new user experience and Stone came up with a purpose statement for the company: "Twitter exists to serve the public conversation".

In April 2021, Twitter announced that it was establishing its African headquarters in Ghana.

In January 2022, Twitter finalized the sale of MoPub to AppLovin. The deal was first announced in October 2021, and the selling price was reported at $1.05 billion.

=== 2022 and 2023 ===
==== Acquisition by Elon Musk ====
Businessman Elon Musk revealed that he had bought 9.1% of Twitter for $2.64 billion on April 4, 2022. In response, Twitter's stock rose by as much as 27% and Twitter shares experienced the largest intraday surge since Twitter's IPO in 2013. Musk was appointed to Twitter's board on April 9, under a deal that prohibited him from acquiring more than 14.9% of the company.

Musk made an unsolicited offer on April 14 to acquire Twitter for $44 billion and take the company private. Publicly, Musk expressed that his offer was motivated by concerns with how the company was managed, emphasizing his concern that policies he described as censorship were leading to a lack of free speech on the platform. Twitter's board introduced a "poison pill" strategy on April 15, which would allow shareholders to buy additional stock should a hostile takeover occur as a means to block Musk's takeover. On April 20, Musk secured $46.5 billion in funding as a tender offer, which the board accepted on April 25.

On July 8, Musk announced he was unilaterally terminating the proposed acquisition, claiming in a regulatory filing that Twitter was in "material breach" of several parts of the agreement by refusing to comply with Musk's requests for spambot account data and dismissing high-ranking employees. In response, Twitter board chair Bret Taylor pledged to pursue legal action against Musk at the Delaware Court of Chancery with the goal of completing the acquisition. On July 12, Twitter opened a lawsuit against Musk to force the sale to proceed. On September 13, 2022, Twitter shareholders voted to approve Elon Musk's takeover of the company.

On October 4, 2022, it was reported that Musk offered to proceed with the deal at the original offer price of $54.20 per share. The deal closed on October 27, 2022, with the merger between Twitter, Inc. and X Holdings II, Inc., a wholly owned subsidiary of X Holdings I, Inc., wholly owned by Musk, and Musk took control of the company, paying $54.20 per share, or about $44 billion.

By January 2023, Twitter only had around 2,300 employees left, according to Musk, with only 550 working full-time. By April, there were less than 1,500 active employees left with 80% of Twitter's work force gone within a year.

==== Post-acquisition ====
On October 28, immediately following Musk's acquisition, he fired CEO Parag Agrawal and CFO Ned Segal. Twitter's stock was suspended from trading prior to the New York Stock Exchange opening the next day and was delisted on November 8. On October 31, Musk announced in a security filing that he had dissolved the board of directors and would serve as the CEO of the company. In January 2023, he also fired an employee who criticized him.

On November 4, Twitter laid off about half of its 7,500 employees, leaving several internal departments, including communication and core engineering teams, understaffed. Some of the employees were later asked to return, with Twitter stating that they were "laid off by mistake". Several current and former Twitter employees sued the company for violations of the Worker Adjustment and Retraining Notification Act of 1988 due to failures to provide a 60-day notice prior to mass firings.

Top security, compliance, content moderation, and sales executives resigned due to Musk stating that employees must either work longer hours or resign from the company. On November 16, Musk issued an "ultimatum" to all remaining Twitter employees warning that workers could expect "long, intense hours of work" if they decided to stay, a decision that was ordered to be made by the following day, with news sources reporting numerous employees leaving on the same day. The Verge reported that multiple critical engineering teams "completely or near-total[ly] resigned", increasing internal fears of a collapse of Twitter.

Within a week of Musk's acquisition and subsequent internal instability of the firm, including layoffs of Twitter's trust and safety teams, large advertisers including General Mills, Pfizer, Volkswagen, and General Motors announced an advertising pause. Advertising agencies, including IPG and Omnicom Media Group, advised clients to pause ad spending on Twitter temporarily until the platform can sufficiently assure brand safety concerns. Apprehension over increased hate speech made advertisers leave in large numbers. Impersonator accounts had increased following errors in the blue tick scheme for verified users causing concerns. Musk said Twitter was experiencing "a massive drop in revenue" causing losses of $4 million per day, which he attributed to "activist groups pressuring advertisers," adding that "nothing is working" to lure advertisers back.

According to a November 2022 report from Media Matters for America, Twitter had lost half of its top 100 advertisers, which spent $750 million on ads in 2022. Advertising research firm Standard Media Index said advertiser spending on Twitter declined 55% in November year-on-year, and declined 71% in December, despite those holiday months typically seeing higher ad spending.

By December 2022, Musk's family office privately sought to sell new shares which was valued at his original acquisition price of $54.20, amid turmoil among users and advertisers, and debt payments approaching. Musk's money manager wrote to investors that in recent weeks the family office had received "numerous inbound requests to invest in Twitter." The Wall Street Journal reported in January 2023 that talks had been held to raise up to $3 billion to pay down some of the $13 billion in bank debt incurred in the deal, which includes a $3 billion high interest rate bridge loan. Musk denied the report, saying, "corpo media shills clearly have their marching orders to write hit pieces on me these days." The Journal reported in October 2023 that the seven major banks that provided the $13 billion loan had been unable to follow the standard practice of quickly selling down their exposure to other banks, due to a lack of appetite for the debt since Musk took over. The banks expected to mark down the debt by at least 15% in order to sell it.

In April 2023, Twitter, now under the ownership of Musk, designated National Public Radio as "US state-affiliated media", a label "that's typically been reserved for foreign media outlets that represent the official views of the government, like Russia's RT and China's Xinhua." This move by Twitter sparked a controversy and accusations of pro-Republican bias. In a statement to Variety, NPR president and CEO John Lansing condemned the decision.

Twitter, Inc. was merged with X Corp. in April 2023. X Corp. itself was merged with Musk's startup xAI in March 2025, nearly 2 years later.

== Services ==
=== Twitter ===
Twitter was an American social networking service that was rebranded to X in 2023. Users can share concise text messages, images, and videos through "tweets" and engage with other users' content via likes or "retweets".

=== Vine ===
On October 5, 2012, Twitter acquired a video clip company called Vine that launched in January 2013. Twitter released Vine as a standalone app that allows users to create and share six-second looping video clips on January 24, 2013. Vine videos shared on Twitter are visible directly in users' Twitter feeds. On October 27, 2016, Twitter announced that it would disable all uploads, but that viewing and download would continue to work. On January 20, 2017, Twitter launched an Internet archive of all Vine videos that had ever been published. The archive was officially discontinued in April 2019.

=== Periscope ===
On March 13, 2015, Twitter announced its acquisition of Periscope, an app that allowed live streaming of video. Periscope was launched on March 26, 2015. Due to declining usage, product realignment, and high maintenance costs the service was discontinued on March 31, 2021. However, past Periscope videos can still be watched via Twitter and most of its core features are now incorporated into the app.

=== Crashlytics and Fabric ===
Twitter acquired Crashlytics, a crash reporting tool for developers, on January 28, 2013, for over US$100 million, its largest acquisition at the time. Twitter committed to continue supporting and expanding the service.

In October 2014, Twitter announced Fabric, a suite of mobile developer tools built around Crashlytics. Fabric brought together Crashlytics, Answers (mobile app analytics), Beta (mobile app distribution), Digits (mobile app identity and authentication services), MoPub, and TwitterKit (login with Twitter and Tweet display functionality) into a single, modular SDK, allowing developers to pick and choose which features they needed while guaranteeing ease of installation and compatibility. By building Fabric on top of Crashlytics, Twitter was able to take advantage of Crashlytics' large adoption and device footprint to rapidly scale usage of MoPub and TwitterKit. Fabric reached active distribution across 1 billion mobile devices just 8 months after its launch.

In early 2016, Twitter announced that Fabric was installed on more than 2 billion active devices and used by more than 225,000 developers. Fabric is recognized as the #1 most popular crash reporting and also the #1 mobile analytics solution among the top 200 iOS apps, beating out Google Analytics, Flurry, and Mixpanel. In January 2017, Google acquired Fabric from Twitter and later integrated it into their Firebase platform.

=== Revue ===
Revue was a service which lets writers create email newsletters and offer free or paid subscriptions to them. Revue was founded in the Netherlands in 2015 and acquired by Twitter on January 26, 2021. On December 14, 2022, Twitter announced the service would be discontinued on January 18, 2023, at which point all user data would be deleted.

== Acquisitions ==
On April 11, 2010, Twitter acquired Atebits, developers of the Twitter client Tweetie for the Mac and iPhone.

On January 28, 2013, Twitter acquired Crashlytics in order to build out its mobile developer products. On August 28, 2013, Twitter acquired Trendrr, followed by the acquisition of MoPub on September 9, 2013.

On June 4, 2014, Twitter announced that it would acquire Namo Media, a technology firm specializing in "native advertising" for mobile devices. On June 19, 2014, Twitter announced that it had reached an undisclosed deal to buy SnappyTV, a service that helps edit and share video from television broadcasts. The company was helping broadcasters and rights holders to share video content both organically across social and via Twitter's Amplify program. In July 2014, Twitter announced that it intended to buy a young company called CardSpring for an undisclosed sum. CardSpring enabled retailers to offer online shoppers coupons that they could automatically sync to their credit cards in order to receive discounts when they shopped in physical stores. On July 31, 2014, Twitter announced that it had acquired a small password-security startup called Mitro. On October 29, 2014, Twitter announced a new partnership with IBM. The partnership was intended to help businesses use Twitter data to understand their customers, businesses and other trends.

On February 11, 2015, Twitter announced that it had acquired Niche, an advertising network for social media stars, founded by Rob Fishman and Darren Lachtman. The acquisition price was reportedly $50 million. Twitter announced that it had acquired TellApart, a commerce ads tech firm, with $532 million stock. In June 2016, Twitter acquired an artificial intelligence startup called Magic Pony for $150 million.

On January 26, 2021, Twitter acquired Revue, an email newsletter service to compete with platforms like Substack.

In November and December 2021, Twitter acquired and immediately shut down two competitors: threader.app, a service to transform Twitter threads into accessible web pages, and Quill, a messaging service. Threader.app users were directed to instead purchase the Twitter Blue service, which at the time was available only in some countries.

== Leadership ==
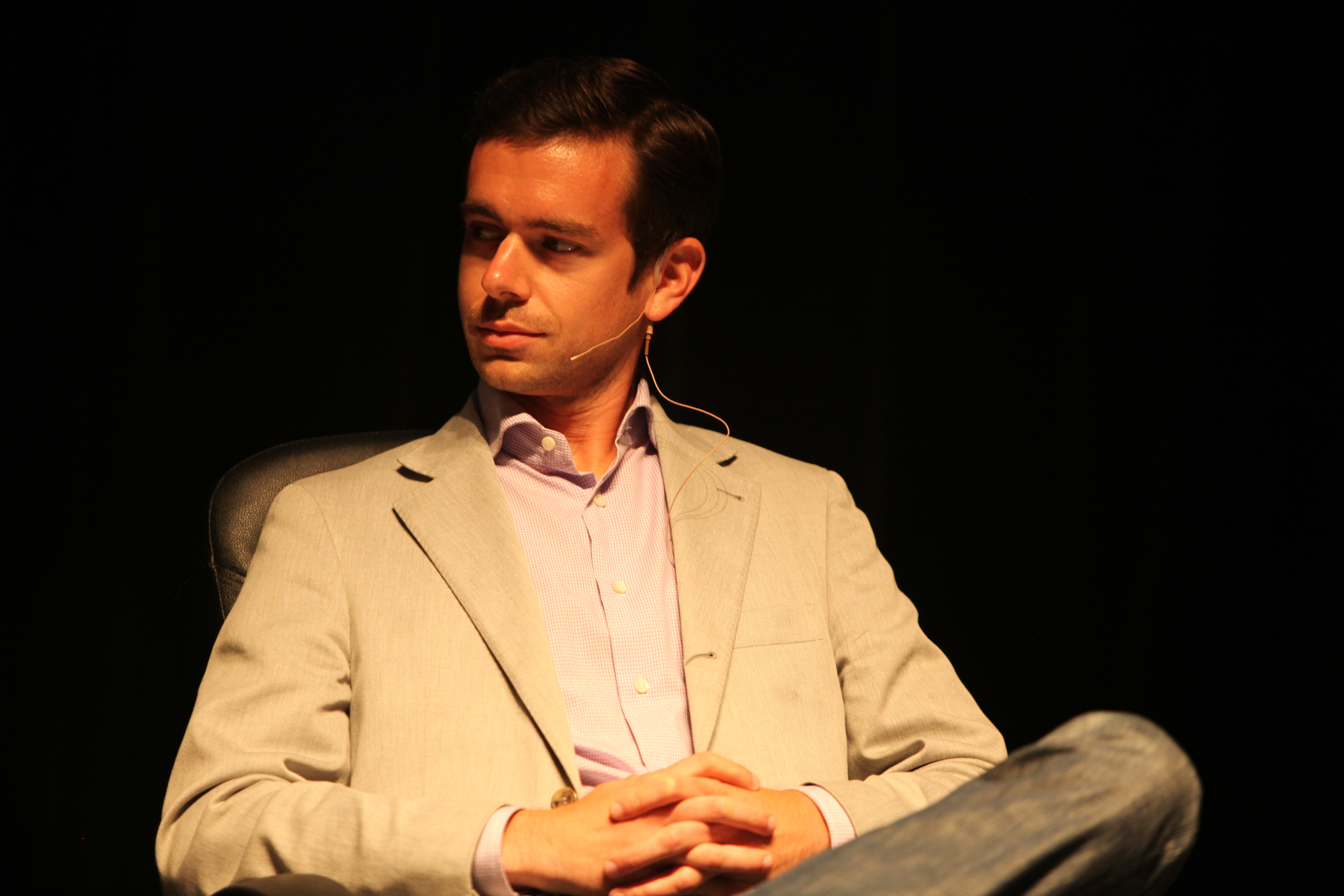
Jack Dorsey, co-founder and then CEO of Twitter, in 2009

As chief executive officer, Dorsey saw the startup through two rounds of capital funding by the venture capitalists who backed the company. On October 16, 2008, Williams took over the role of CEO, and Dorsey became chairman of the board. On October 4, 2010, Williams announced that he was stepping down as CEO. Dick Costolo, formerly Twitter's chief operating officer, became CEO. On October 4, 2010, Williams made an announcement saying that he will stay with the company and "be completely focused on product strategy".

According to The New York Times, "Mr. Dorsey and Mr. Costolo forged a close relationship" when Williams was away. According to PC Magazine, Williams was "no longer involved in the day-to-day goings on at the company". He was focused on developing a new startup, and became a member of Twitter's board of directors, and promised to "help in any way [he could]." Dorsey rejoined Twitter in March 2011, as executive chairman focusing on product development. At that time, he split his schedule with Square (where he is CEO), whose offices are within walking distance of Twitter's in San Francisco.

In September 2011, board members and investors Fred Wilson and Bijan Sabet resigned from Twitter's board of directors. In October 2012, Twitter announced it had hired former Google executive Matt Derella to become their new director of business agency development. Twitter named former Goldman Sachs executive Anthony Noto as the company's CFO in July 2014, with an "annual salary of $250,000 and one-time restricted stock options of 1.5 million shares ... valued at $61.5 million". On June 10, 2015, Twitter announced its CEO Dick Costolo would resign on July 1, 2015. Noto was said to be considered a potential replacement for outgoing CEO Costolo. On October 14, 2015, former Google chief business officer Omid Kordestani became executive chairman, replacing Dorsey who remains CEO. On January 26, 2016, Leslie Berland, former executive vice president of global advertising, marketing, and digital partnerships at American Express, was named chief marketing officer. In November 2016, COO Adam Bain announced his resignation and CFO Anthony Noto took over Bain's role. A month later, on December 20, 2016, CTO Adam Messinger announced that he too was leaving.

In February 2020, it was reported that Elliott Management Corporation had acquired a stake in Twitter, with activist shareholder and Republican Party supporter Paul Singer expected to seek the removal of Dorsey as CEO. Twitter agreed to appoint a new independent director and two new board members, and to perform $2 billion in share buybacks.

On November 29, 2021, Jack Dorsey stepped down as CEO. He was replaced by CTO Parag Agrawal. On October 27, 2022, Elon Musk closed a deal to purchase the company and fired Agrawal, CFO Ned Segal, chief legal officer Vijaya Gadde, and general counsel Sean Edgett. Musk replaced the prior board as the sole director of Twitter and appointed himself as the CEO.

=== List of chairmen ===
1. Jack Dorsey (2008–2015)
2. Omid Kordestani (2015–2020)
3. Patrick Pichette (2020–2021)
4. Bret Taylor (2021–2022)

=== List of CEOs ===
1. Jack Dorsey (2006–2008); first term
2. Evan Williams (2008–2010)
3. Dick Costolo (2010–2015)
4. Jack Dorsey (2015–2021); second term
5. Parag Agrawal (2021–2022)
6. Elon Musk (2022–2023)
7. Linda Yaccarino (2023–2025)

== Finances ==
For the fiscal year 2021, the last fiscal before Twitter was taken private, the company reported a loss of 221 million, with an annual revenue of $5.1 billion. Since its IPO, Twitter made profit in only two of the eight years.

Year	Revenue in mil. US$	Net income in mil. US$	Total assets in mil. US$	Employees
2010	28	−67	0	—N/a
2011	106	−164	721	—N/a
2012	317	−79	832	2,000
2013	665	−645	3,366	2,712
2014	1,403	−578	5,583	3,638
2015	2,218	−521	6,442	3,898
2016	2,530	−457	6,870	3,583
2017	2,443	−108	7,412	3,372
2018	3,042	1,206	10,163	3,900
2019	3,459	1,466	12,703	4,900
2020	3,716	−1,136	13,379	5,500+
2021	5,077	−221	14,060	7,500+

=== Funding ===
Twitter raised over US$57 million from venture capitalist growth funding, although exact figures are not publicly disclosed. Twitter's first A round of funding was for an undisclosed amount that is rumored to have been between US$1 million and US$5 million. Its second B round of funding in 2008 was for US$22 million and its third C round of funding in 2009 was for US$35 million from Institutional Venture Partners and Benchmark Capital along with an undisclosed amount from other investors including Union Square Ventures, Spark Capital, and Insight Venture Partners. Twitter is backed by Union Square Ventures, Digital Garage, Spark Capital, and Bezos Expeditions.

The company raised US$200 million in new venture capital in December 2010, at a valuation of approximately US$3.7 billion. In August 2010 Twitter announced a "significant" investment led by Digital Sky Technologies that, at US$800 million, was reported to be the largest venture round in history. In December 2011, the Saudi prince Alwaleed bin Talal invested US$300 million in Twitter. The company was valued at US$8.4 billion at the time.

=== Stock launch and tax issues ===
On September 12, 2013, Twitter announced that it had filed papers with the U.S. Securities and Exchange Commission (SEC) ahead of a planned stock market listing. It revealed its prospectus in an 800-page filing. Twitter planned to raise US$1 billion as the basis for its stock market debut. The initial public offering (IPO) filing states that "200,000,000+ monthly active users" access Twitter and "500,000,000+ tweets per day" are posted. In an October 15, 2013, amendment to their SEC S-1 filing, Twitter declared that they would list on the New York Stock Exchange (NYSE), quashing speculation that their stock would trade on the Nasdaq exchange. This decision was widely viewed to be a reaction to the botched initial public offering of Facebook. On November 6, 2013, 70 million shares were priced at US$26 and issued by lead underwriter Goldman Sachs.

On November 7, 2013, the first day of trading on the NYSE, Twitter shares opened at $26.00 and closed at US$44.90, giving the company a valuation of around US$31 billion. Consequently, executives and early investors marginally increased their capital, including co-founders Williams and Dorsey who received a sum of US$2.56 billion and US$1.05 billion respectively, while Costolo's payment was US$345 million. On February 5, 2014, Twitter published its first results as a public company, showing a net loss of $511 million in the fourth quarter of 2013.

In November 2017, the Paradise Papers, a set of confidential electronic documents relating to offshore investment, revealed that Twitter is among the corporations that avoided paying taxes by using offshore companies. Later The New York Times reported that Russian-American billionaire Yuri Milner had strong Kremlin backing for his investments in Facebook and Twitter.

== See also ==
- Timeline of social media
