= Odeo =

American website (2005–2017)

- Website type: Podcast publishing and aggregation
- Owners: Obvious Corporation (2006–2007); Sonic Mountain (2007–2010)
- Creators: Evan Williams; Noah Glass
- Registration: Free
- Launched: July 10, 2005
- Current status: domain expired in 2017

Odeo was an American directory and search destination website for RSS-syndicated audio and video. It employed tools that enabled users to create, record, and share podcasts with a simple Adobe Flash-based interface.

Odeo was originally developed in 2004 by founders Noah Glass and Evan Williams, who were the founders of Audioblog and Pyra Labs, respectively, and received funding from Charles River Ventures. Subsequently, Williams bought out Charles River's interest in the company, as well as that of several other investors, and re‑formed the organization under a new company, Obvious Corporation, which planned to develop new products, including Twitter.

== History ==
Kevin Systrom, cofounder of Instagram, was an intern at Odeo during the summer of 2005.

On February 19, 2007, Williams wrote in his blog that Odeo was for sale. It was acquired soon afterwards by New York-based Sonic Mountain.

On September 14, 2007, Sonic Mountain announced that it had acquired the technology assets of FireAnt, an RSS video-aggregation website and desktop media player, and that it planned to incorporate FireAnt's technology into Odeo. On March 18, 2008, Sonic Mountain announced that it had acquired Blogdigger, a search engine for blogs and RSS content, with plans to incorporate the technology into Odeo. In June 2008, Odeo was relaunched by Sonic Mountain with a completely redesigned site and an expanded focus on search and discovery for syndicated audio and video.

In March 2009, Odeo began its transition to a fee-based service for large corporations looking to manage their video libraries. Targeting companies that needed to organize and track video usage, Odeo released its “Enterprise Video Management” platform as a Software as a Service (SaaS) solution. Their first customers included such notables as American Express and eGA.

In August 2010, Odeo suspended its support of the consumer site odeo.com to focus its attention on enterprise video.

As of 2017, Odeo's domain has expired and has been sold.

== See also ==
- Video aggregator
