= Yidio =

Video aggregator

- Type: Private
- Traded as: Optional
- Industry: Video aggregation
- Founded: San Francisco, California January 1, 2008
- Founders: Brandon Eatros and Adam Eatros
- Headquarters: San Francisco’s SOMA District, USA
- Area served: Worldwide
- Key people: Brandon Eatros (Co-Founder and CEO); Adam Eatros (Co-Founder and COO)
- Number of employees: 35
- Website: http://www.yidio.com/

Yidio, short for Your Internet Video, is a video aggregator. Its platform collects content from multiple subscription-based video streaming providers and allows users to view that content from a single interface.

== Overview ==
Yidio aims to solve the problem of multiple streaming providers' offering different content, by gathering all the providers and content onto one platform. Yidio consolidates streaming video from providers such as Amazon Prime, Crackle, Crunchyroll, Hulu, iTunes, Netflix, Showtime, and over 100 others. Yidio's home screen shows new releases and recently aired television programs. The interface organizes movies and television programs by genre or source, shows program descriptions and provides ratings from Rotten Tomatoes. Yidio's platform aggregates over one million TV shows and movies.

== History ==
Yidio was founded by Brandon and Adam Eatros in January 2008, and debuted in June that same year. In November 2009, Yidio raised $350,000 from angel investors Alan Warms, Jim Collis, Bill Luby, Jamie Crouthamel, and Lon Chow. It added Yidio Alerts for Facebook and Twitter in 2011. Yidio released a mobile app for iPhone in July 2013; its Android app followed soon after. The Yidio app was featured in the "Mario's Top 3" segment on The Today Show on July 28, 2013.
