= QLess =

- Company type: Private
- Industry: Computer software
- Founded: February 15, 2007; 19 years ago in Altadena, California, United States
- Founders: Alex Bäcker; Tim McCune (CTO)
- Headquarters: Pasadena, California, United States
- Area served: Worldwide
- Key people: James Harvey (CEO); Said Malikov (CFO)
- Products: QLess
- Website: qless.com

QLess is an American cloud-based software company headquartered in Pasadena, California. It provides products focused on queue and line management, appointment scheduling, virtual service, and service business intelligence (BI).

Founded in 2007, QLess was the first cloud-based queue management software to enter the market. In 2023, QLess released an enhanced version of its software titled Tempo, making it the first queue management system to offer real-time queue insights as well as historical queue data analysis.

== Overview ==
QLess provides queue management software that aims to eliminate crowded lobbies and give people back their time from waiting in line. The software uses a combination of online, kiosk, and mobile queuing techniques which allows people to join a line from different access points and wait remotely instead of needing to be on-location and in the lobby. Service managers and agents are then able to organize every transaction–appointments, walk-ins and virtual service, like service call back calls–from a single point.

In 2023, QLess announced it surpassed 200 million visitors served.

== Services ==
The industries QLess serves include local government (over 300 cities and counties), higher education (over 200 colleges and universities), healthcare and retail. QLess offers several queue management and customer engagement services including: appointment scheduling, call back queuing, live insights and service business intelligence.

== Operations ==
The company was founded in Altadena, California by Alex Bäcker and Tim McCune before moving its headquarters to Pasadena, California.

The company maintains a fully remote workforce spanning North America and Europe.

=== Removal of Founder and CEO ===
In 2019, founder, majority common shareholder, and CEO Alex Bäcker was removed as a board member and as serving CEO following substantiated employee complaints regarding Bäcker.

In response to the board’s request for his resignation, Bäcker organized a failed coup against board members, including Palisades Growth Capital, in order to retain his position as CEO and on the board. This led to his ultimate removal from the company following the failed coup and lawsuit.

In 2021, Palisades Growth Capital acquired a controlling stake of QLess.

In 2022, James Harvey was named CEO.

On June 19, 2024, with the full backing of its investors and primary lender, QLess strategically chose to file a Subchapter IV Chapter 11 in efforts to protect the future interests of the company and shed the mounting legal fees associated with the frivolous lawsuits. Shortly after the filing went public, QLess received an additional cash infusion of $3M, ensuring its continued growth while navigating the legal issues.

The reorganization plan was confirmed and approved on September 16, 2024, and QLess exited bankruptcy on September 18, 2024.

== Related ==
Service Oklahoma Cuts Wait Times in Half with New Check In System
