= Mark Ghuneim =

American internet entrepreneur

Mark Ghuneim is an American internet entrepreneur.

== Career ==
Ghuneim began his career as program director and VJ at the 21st Street video nightclub Private Eyes in New York City. After positions at MTV's "120 Minutes," and Beggars Banquet/XL/4AD Records, a British independent label, he became vice president of video promotion for Columbia Records.

In 1994 Ghuneim was the vice president of online and emerging technologies at Columbia Records. Ghuneim created and implemented online marketing campaigns for Columbia Records.

His initiatives at Sony Music included the formation of an online and emerging-technologies group as well as innovations in online marketing and promotion, social networking and community management. He was previously senior vice president of online and emerging technology at Sony Music Entertainment. In 2004, Ghuneim left Sony Music Entertainment to launch Wiredset, a start-up digital services company for television networks, movie companies, publishers and emerging brands.

Ghuneim subsequently became General Manager of Twitter’s Curator, a position he held until early 2016.

== Politics ==
In 1997, Ghuneim founded Hacked.net. Ghuneim has worked with the American Civil Liberties Union and New York Civil Liberties Union to oppose surveillance in public spaces. He believes that people have a right to be anonymous in their interactions in public spaces.
