= Customer engagement =

Type of interaction

Customer engagement is a marketing and strategic management concept. Practitioners view it as interactions, "engagements", between a firm and its customers, while academic researchers define it as a psychological state that “occurs by virtue of interactive customer experiences with a focal agent/object”, where focal agent/object can be any type of organization and/or its offerings such as branded products or services. As such, customer engagement is seen as a customer’s motivationally driven, volitional cognitive, emotional, and behavioral investments into interactions with such a focal agent/object. Marketing scholars see customer engagement as a key construct in understanding customer journeys and the most recent phase in marketing theory and management, following customer buying behavior process models (60s-70s), customer satisfaction and loyalty (70s), service quality (80s), relationship marketing (90s), customer relationship management (2000s), and customer centricity/ focus (2000s-2010s).

== Definition ==
In March 2006, the Advertising Research Foundation announced the first definition of customer engagement as "turning on a prospect to a brand idea enhanced by the surrounding context." However, the ARF definition was criticized by some for being too broad. The ARF, World Federation of Advertisers, Various definitions have translated different aspects of customer engagement. Forrester Consulting's research in 2008, has defined customer engagement as "creating deep connections with customers that drive purchase decisions, interaction, and participation, over time". Studies by the Economist Intelligence Unit result in defining customer engagement as, "an intimate long-term relationship with the customer". Both of these concepts prescribe that customer engagement is attributed to a rich association formed with customers. With aspects of relationship marketing and service-dominant perspectives, customer engagement can be loosely defined as "consumers' proactive contributions in co-creating their personalized experiences and perceived value with organizations through active, explicit, and ongoing dialogue and interactions". The book, Best Digital Marketing Campaigns In The World, defines customer engagement as, "mutually beneficial relationships with a constantly growing community of online consumers". The various definitions of customer engagement are diversified by different perspectives and contexts of the engagement process. These are determined by the brand, product, or service, the audience profile, attitudes and behaviours, and messages and channels of communication that are used to interact with the customer.

Since 2009, a number of new definitions have been proposed in the literature. In 2011, the term was defined as "the level of a customer’s cognitive, emotional and behavioral investment in specific brand interactions," and identifies the three CE dimensions of immersion (cognitive), passion (emotional) and activation (behavioral). It was also defined as "a psychological state that occurs by virtue of interactive, co-creative customer experiences with a particular agent/object (e.g. a brand)". Researchers have based their work on customer engagement as a multi-dimensional construct, while also identifying that it is context-dependent. Engagement gets manifested in the various interactions that customers undertake, which in turn get shaped up by individual cultures. The context is not limited to geographical context, but also includes the medium with which the user engages. Moreover, customer engagement is the emotional involvement and psychological process in which both new and existing consumers become loyal to specific types of services or products. The degree to which customers pay attention to companies or products, as well as their participation in operations, is referred to as customer engagement.

At present, practitioners view and define customer engagement as interaction between a firm and its customers, while academic researchers define it as a psychological state of the consumer.

== Ethics ==
Efforts to boost user engagement can raise ethical concerns and privacy issues, further amplified with the rise of the use of modern artificial intelligence. Facebook and several other social media platforms have faced criticism for manipulating user emotions to enhance engagement, even if it is knowingly false content. Professor Hany Farid summarized Facebook’s approach, stating, “When you’re in the business of maximizing engagement, you’re not interested in truth."

== Online customer engagement ==
Offline customer engagement predates online, but the latter is a qualitatively different social phenomenon, unlike any offline customer engagement that social theorists or marketers recognize. In the past, customer engagement has been generated irresolutely through television, radio, media, outdoor advertising, and various other touchpoints ideally during peak and/or high trafficked allocations. However, the only conclusive results of campaigns were sales and/or return on investment figures. The widespread adoption of the internet during the late 1990s has enhanced the processes of customer engagement, in particular, the way in which it can now be measured in different ways on different levels of engagement. It is a recent social phenomenon where people engage online in communities that do not necessarily revolve around a particular product but serve as meeting or networking places. This online engagement has brought about both the empowerment of consumers and the opportunity for businesses to engage with their target customers online. A 2011 market analysis revealed that 80% of online customers, after reading negative online reviews, report making alternate purchasing decisions, while 87% of consumers said a favorable review has confirmed their decision to go through with a purchase.

The concept and practice of online customer engagement enables organisations to respond to the fundamental changes in customer behaviour that the internet has brought about, as well as to the increasing ineffectiveness of the traditional 'interrupt and repeat', broadcast model of advertising. Due to the fragmentation and specialisation of media and audiences, as well as the proliferation of community and user-generated content, businesses are increasingly losing the power to dictate the communications agenda. Simultaneously, lower switching costs, the geographical widening of the market and the vast choice of content, services and products available online have weakened customer loyalty. Enhancing customers' firm and market-related expertise has been shown to engage customers, strengthen their loyalty, and emotionally connect them more closely to a firm.

== Marketing value ==
Customer engagement marketing is necessitated by a combination of social, technological and market developments. Companies attempt to create an engaging dialogue with target consumers and stimulate their engagement with the given brand. Although this must take place both on and off-line, the internet is considered the primary method. Marketing begins with understanding the internal dynamics of these developments and the behaviour and engagement of consumers online. Consumer-generated media plays a significant role in the understanding and modeling of engagement. The control Web 2.0 consumers have gained is quantified through 'old school' marketing performance metrics.

The effectiveness of the traditional 'interrupt and repeat' model of advertising is decreasing, which has caused businesses to lose control of communications agendas. In August 2006, McKinsey & Co published a report which indicated that traditional TV advertising would decrease in effectiveness compared to previous decades. As customer audiences have become smaller and more specialised, the fragmentation of media, audiences and the accompanying reduction of audience size have reduced the effectiveness of the traditional top-down, mass, 'interrupt and repeat' advertising model. A Forrester Research's North American Consumer Technology Adoption Study found that people in the 18-26 age group spend more time online than watching TV.

In response to the fragmentation and increased amount of time spent online, marketers have also increased spending in online communication. ContextWeb analysts found marketers who promote on sites like Facebook and New York Times are not as successful at reaching consumers while marketers who promote more on niche websites have a better chance of reaching their audiences. Customer audiences are also broadcasters with the power for circulation and permanence of CGM, businesses lose influence. Rather than trying to position a product using static messages, companies can become the subject of conversation amongst a target market that has already discussed, positioned and rated the product. This also means that consumers can now choose not only when and how but, also, if they will engage with marketing communications. In addition, new media provides consumers with more control over advertising consumption.

Research shows the importance of customer engagement in the modern market. The lowering of entry barriers, such as the need for a sales force, access to channels and physical assets, and the geographical widening of the market due to the internet have brought about increasing competition and a decrease in brand loyalty. In combination with lower switching costs, easier access to information about products and suppliers and increased choice, brand loyalty is hard to achieve. The increasing ineffectiveness of television advertising is due to the shift of consumer attention to the internet and new media, which controls advertising consumption and causes a decrease in audience size. A study conducted by Salesforce shows an overwhelming 8% of customers acknowledge that their experience with the business is equivalent to the quality of its products or services. Therefore, it is important to prioritize customer engagement as a business strategy.

The proliferation of media that provide consumers with more control over their advertising consumption (subscription-based digital radio and TV) and the simultaneous decrease of trust in advertising and increase of trust in peers point to the need for communications that the customer will desire to engage with. Stimulating a consumer's engagement with a brand is the only way to increase brand loyalty and, therefore, "the best measure of current and future performance".

== Consumer behavior ==
CE behaviour became prominent with the advent of the social phenomenon of online CE. Creating and stimulating customer engagement behaviour has recently become an explicit aim of both profit and non-profit organisations in the belief that engaging target customers to a high degree is conducive to furthering business objectives.

Shevlin's definition of CE is well suited to understanding the process that leads to an engaged customer. In its adaptation by Richard Sedley the key word is 'investment'. "Repeated interactions that strengthen the emotional, psychological or physical investment a customer has in a brand."

A customer's degree of engagement with a company lies in a continuum that represents the strength of his investment in that company. Positive experiences with the company strengthen that investment and move the customer down the line of engagement.

What is important in measuring degrees of involvement is the ability of defining and quantifying the stages on the continuum. One popular suggestion is a four-level model adapted from Kirkpatrick's Levels:

1. Click – A reader arrived (current metric)
2. Consume – A reader read the content
3. Understood – A reader understood the content and remembers it
4. Applied – A reader applies the content in another venue

Concerns have, however, been expressed as regards the measurability of stages three and four. Another popular suggestion is Ghuneim's typology of engagement.

Degrees of engagement	Low	Medium	High	Highest
	Adoption	Collaborative filtering	Content creation	Social
	Bookmarking, tagging, adding to the group	Rating, voting, commenting, endorsing, favouritising	Upload (user-generated content), blogging, fan community participation, mash-up creation, podcasting, vlogging	Addition of friends, networking, fan community creation

The following consumer typology according to degree of engagement fits also into Ghuneim's continuum: creators (smallest group), critics, collectors, couch potatoes (largest group).

Engagement is a holistic characterization of a consumer's behavior, encompassing a host of sub-aspects of behaviour such as loyalty, satisfaction, involvement, word-of-mouth advertising, complaining and more.

- Satisfaction: Satisfaction is simply the foundation, and the minimum requirement, for a continuing relationship with customers. Engagement extends beyond mere satisfaction.
- Loyalty – Retention: Highly engaged consumers are more loyal. Increasing the engagement of target customers increases the rate of customer retention.
- Word-of-mouth advertising – advocacy: Highly engaged customers are more likely to engage in free (for the company), credible (for their audience) word-of-mouth advertising. This can drive new customer acquisition and can have viral effects.
- Awareness – Effectiveness of communications: When customers are exposed to communication from a company that they are highly engaged with, they tend to actively elaborate on its central idea. This brings about high degrees of central processing and recall.
- Filtering: Consumers filter, categorize and rate the market from head to tail, creating multiple, overlapping folksonomies through tagging, reviewing, rating and recommending.
- Complaint-behaviour: Highly engaged customers are less likely to complain to other current or potential customers, but will address the company directly instead.
- Marketing intelligence: Highly engaged customers can give valuable recommendations for improving the quality of the offering.

The behavioural outcomes of an engaged consumer are what links CE to profits. From this point of view,

"CE is the best measure of current and future performance; an engaged relationship is probably the only guarantee for a return on your organization's or your clients' objectives." Simply attaining a high level of customer satisfaction does not seem to guarantee the customer's business. 60% to 80% of customers who defect to a competitor said they were satisfied or very satisfied on the survey just prior to their defection.

The main difference between traditional and customer engagement marketing is marked by these shifts:

- From 'reach or awareness focused' marketing communications and their metrics (GRP or pageview) towards more targeted and customised interactions that prompt the consumer to engage with and act on the content from the outset.
- From absolute distinctions and barriers between an organisation and its target customers towards the participation of consumers in product development, customer service and other aspects of the brand experience.
- From one-way, top-down, formal B2C and B2E interaction to continuing, dialogic, decentralised and personalised communications initiated by either party.

Specific marketing practices involve:

- Encouraging collaborative filtering: Google, Amazon, iTunes, Yahoo LAUNCHcast, Netflix, and Rhapsody encourage their consumers to filter, categorise and rate; that is, to market their products. They realise consumers are not only much more adept at creating highly targeted taxonomies (folksonomies) given that they are more adept at delineating the segment they themselves constitute, but, also, that they are willing to do so for free. And to the extent they cannot, they do it for them. If enough people like the band Groove Armada as well as the band The Crystal Method, there may well be a stylistic connection between them, despite the fact that one's categorised as 'downtempo' and the other 'beats and breaks'. Such strong associations tell Yahoo! to put the two on the same playlist more often, and if the positive ratings continue to come in, that connection is reinforced. Amazon does the same with their ‘customers who bought this item also bought…’ recommendations.
- Community development: Helping target customers develop their own communities or create new ones.
- Community participation: (See Communal marketing) Consumers do not filter and rate companies and their offerings within company websites only. Being able, with little effort, cost or technical skills, to create their own online localities, a large percentage of the filtering and rating takes place in non-sponsored, online spaces. Organisations must go and meet their target customers at their favoured online hangouts to not only listen but also participate in the dialogue.
- Help consumers engage with one another: Give them content (viral podcasting, videocasting, games, v-cards etc.) they can use to engage with one another.
- Solicitation of user generated content: Engage them directly or indirectly with your product by giving them the means or incentive to create user generated content.
- Customer self-service: Help them create a customer service FAQ in wiki or blog format. Create a blog where technical support staff and customers can communicate directly.
- Product co-development: Create a blog where product developers and consumers can communicate directly.
- Leading by teaching: Help customers in product selection by first teaching them practically, showing them a video about product use and then help them to select the product.

== Metrics ==
All marketing practices, including internet marketing, include measuring the effectiveness of various media along the customer engagement cycle, as consumers travel from awareness to purchase. Often the use of CVP Analysis factors into strategy decisions, including budgets and media placement.

The CE metric is useful for:

a) Planning:

- Identify where CE-marketing efforts should take place; which of the communities that the target customers participate in are the most engaging?
- Specify the way in which target customers engage, or want to engage, with the company or offering.

b) Measuring Effectiveness: Measure how successful CE-marketing efforts have been at engaging target customers.

The importance of CE as a marketing metric is reflected in ARF's statement:

"The industry is moving toward customer engagement with marketing communications as the 21st century metric of marketing efficiency and effectiveness."

ARF envisages CE exclusively as a metric of engagement with communication, but it is not necessary to distinguish between engaging with the communication and with the product since CE behaviour deals with, and is influenced by, involvement with both.

In order to be operational, CE-metrics must be combined with psychodemographics. It is not enough to know that a website has 500 highly engaged members, for instance; it is imperative to know what percentage are members of the company's target market. As a metric for effectiveness, Scott Karp suggests, CE is the solution to the same intractable problems that have long been a struggle for old media: how to prove value.

The CE-metric is synthetic and integrates a number of variables. The World Federation of Advertisers calls it 'consumer-centric holistic measurement'.

== See also ==
- Active users
- Marketing
