= Engine No. 1 =

American activist impact investing hedge fund

- Industry: Hedge fund
- Founded: 2020; 6 years ago
- Headquarters: San Francisco, California, U.S.
- Area served: Worldwide
- Number of employees: 39
- Website: engine1.com

Engine No. 1 is an American investment firm. It attracted attention with its campaign to replace four members of ExxonMobil's board of directors despite owning only 0.02% of the company's shares. The firm describes its investment approach as "active ownership", as it prefers to work with management instead of launching activist campaigns.

The fund was founded in December 2020 and its most recent (Note: as of January 2022) 13F filing indicated that it had $430 million in assets under management. Christopher James is the founder and chief investment officer of the firm and Erik Belz serves as President and chief operating officer. As of October 2021, the fund employed 39 staff.

== History ==
Engine No. 1 was founded by Christopher James with $250 million of his own funds in December 2020. The name refers to one of the oldest fire stations in San Francisco, the city the fund is based in. Charles Penner, who previously worked at Jana Partners, an activist fund pushing Apple to work more on limiting children's smartphone usage, and Jennifer Grancio, who co-founded BlackRock's iShares exchange traded funds business, were also members of the founding team. (Note: Pennner left the firm in November 2021.)

=== Christopher James ===
Christopher James, the firm's founder and executive chairman, grew up in Harrisburg, Illinois. He studied economics at Tulane University and later served on its board of trustees. During the dot-com boom, he operated a coal mine in Illinois and built storage facilities for the oil and gas sector. He also founded and worked for a number of investment funds before founding Engine No. 1.

James was a founder of Tipping Point Community, an anti-poverty organisation based in San Francisco. Working mainly on the area's homelessness problem, he realized that many of his peers were working for tech companies, which were the major factor behind rising rents. After this realization, he began reading up on the social value of business, with writings including those of Luigi Zingales and Michael Porter. He concluded that companies should take care of their impacts and decided to found Engine No. 1 in 2020.

=== ExxonMobil ===
Engine No. 1's decision to invest in ExxonMobil was sparked by a family dinner of James in 2019. His sons asked him how he squared environmentalism – he served on the board of the National Fish and Wildlife Foundation – with his investments in energy companies. After finding his own answer lacking, he decided to "take on" ExxonMobil.

Engine No. 1 bought a stake in ExxonMobil worth $40 million in December 2020, which equated to about 0.02% of the oil company's shares. At that time, institutional investors were already becoming frustrated with the company lagging behind its competitors in preparing for the energy transition, ExxonMobil also incurred a $22 billion loss that year.

==== Open letter ====
On December 7, 2020, James wrote an open letter to the board of directors, pointing out Exxon's poor return on capital employed (ROCE). Writing for the Harvard Business Review, Robert Eccles and Colin Mayer argue that Exxon's poor capital allocation stemmed from its decades of climate change denial. The letter asked for widespread reform and proposed an alternative slate of four independent directors, all with experience of the energy sector.

Given its small stake in the company, the investment fund's strategy relied on convincing Exxon's large shareholders, the largest three being BlackRock, The Vanguard Group and State Street, to back its plans. Engine No. 1 appealed less to environmental principles and more to profitability in their strategy to convince investors. It said that Exxon's focus on fossil fuels threatened future returns, stating that the company faced "existential risks".

==== Reactions ====
Exxon reacted to Engine No. 1's campaign by expanding its board and adding a director with sustainable investing experience. It also announced a plan for a carbon capture business and a new carbon capture technology venture, both believed to be a consequence of Engine No. 1's activities. According to Exxon, the company expected to spend $35 million on the proxy battle. Engine No. 1 estimated its costs to add up to $30 million. Some experts believed Exxon's spending to hit $100 million.

The California State Teachers' Retirement System, the US' second largest public pension fund, announced its support on the day Christopher James' initial letter was published, the Church of England followed suit a few days later. With CalPERS and the New York State Common Retirement Fund disclosing their support some time after that, the United States three biggest pension funds were backing the alternative slate. Institutional Shareholder Services, a proxy advisor, endorsed three of the four candidates on Engine No. 1's slate in May 2021. Glass Lewis supported two candidates. However, D.E. Shaw, which had also been calling for changes at the oil company, reached an agreement with Exxon in March. Exxon used the agreement to unsuccessfully pressure Engine No. 1 into abandoning its campaign.

==== Shareholder meeting ====
On May 26, 2021, the day of the shareholder meeting, preliminary vote counts suggested that at least two of Engine No. 1's candidates would be successful. During the meeting, ExxonMobil declared a one-hour recess, ostensibly following demands by shareholders for more time to consider their votes. The move was believed to provide further opportunity for negotiations over votes and was described by a former oil executive as "pretty desperate". By the end of the meeting, two candidates had been elected to the board of directors, with the vote over a third one being too close to call. A week later, Exxon announced that Engine No. 1's slate had won a third seat.

According to industry experts, changing ExxonMobil's strategy will be a difficult and protracted process.

Medlock Investments, owned by Christopher James, is the parent company of Greenfield Louisiana, which plans to build a grain elevator in Wallace, Louisiana. While the company says that the project will be safe and provide jobs, critics argue that it will prove to be an environmental hazard and contrast it with James' image as an environmental activist.

== Investment activities ==
As of June 2021, Engine No. 1 holds small stakes in John Deere and Bunge Limited. In October 2021, the firm announced that it had taken a stake in General Motors, an investment it justified in part with GM's investments into electric vehicles.

=== ETF ===
On June 23, 2021, Engine No. 1 launched an exchange-traded fund with $100 million in assets from institutional investors.

The Engine No. 1 Transition 500 ETF (trading under the ticker VOTE) tracks the largest 500 companies in the US by market capitalization. Instead of selecting and excluding stocks based on ESG criteria, the ETF seeks to align the companies invested in with its ESG goals. The active role it will take in corporate governance is unusual for an ETF, but becoming more common. The ETF will also use its shares to support proxy campaigns of Engine No. 1. It is open to retail investors, advisors and pension plans via Betterment's investment platform. As of March 2022, it had $329 million in assets.

The firm launched a second ESG fund in February 2022. The Transform Climate ETF (traded under NETZ) is actively managed and invests in firms active in the largest carbon-emitting industries. At the time of its launch, its three largest holdings were General Motors, John Deere, and Occidental Petroleum.

In October 2023, Engine No. 1 sold its ETF platform to the TCW Group. TCW Group has now changed Transform Climate ETF's ticker from NETZ to PWRD.

=== Powering AI ===
In February 2025, Engine No. 1 partnered with Chevron to power AI data centers in the United States using US natural gas. The companies plan to co-locate power plants with data centers and deliver up to four gigawatts of electricity, enough to power up to 3.5mn homes, by 2027
