= Daniel Lurie =

Mayor of San Francisco since 2025

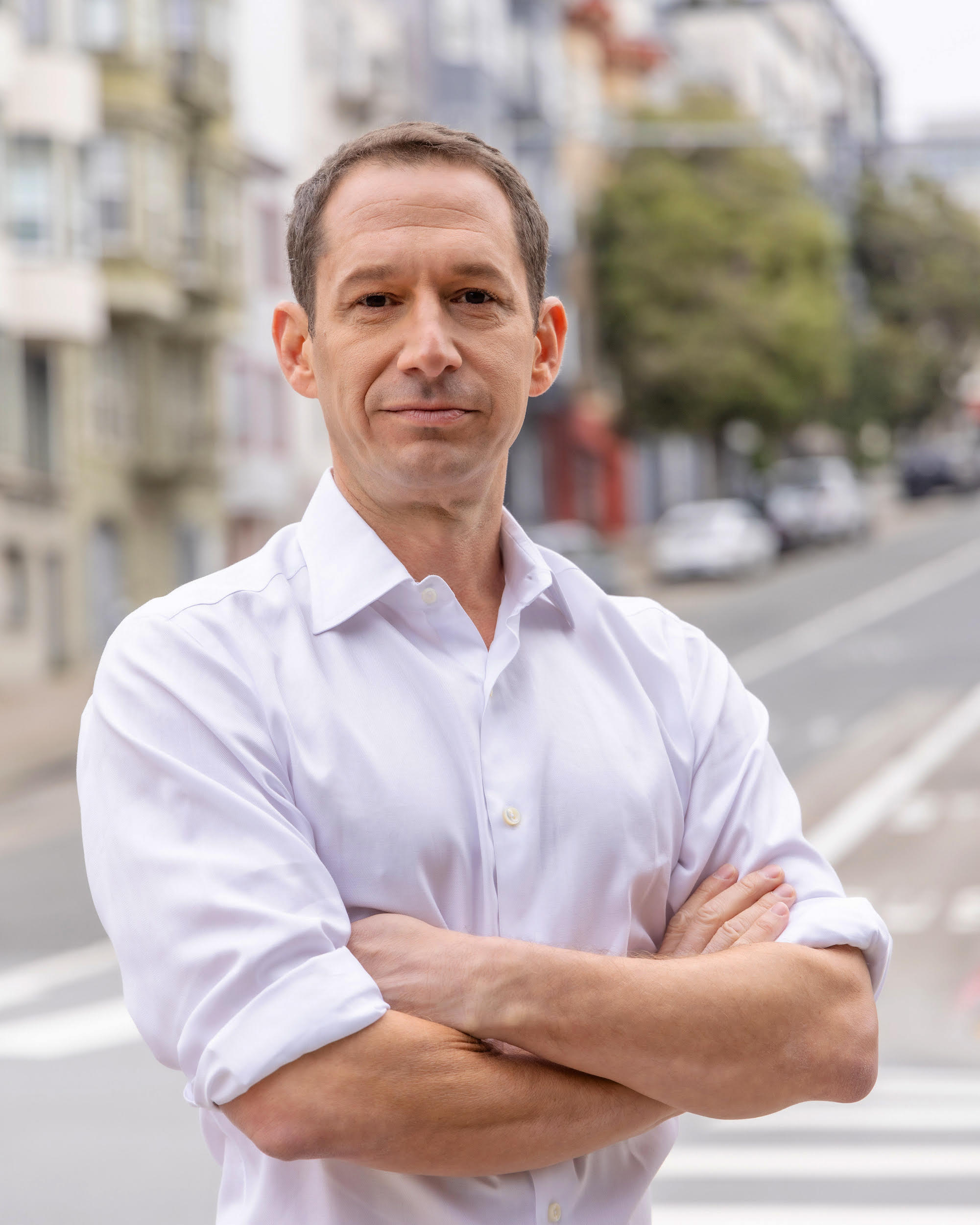
- Lurie in 2024

46th Mayor of San Francisco
- Incumbent
- Assumed office January 8, 2025
- Preceded by: London Breed

Personal details
- Born: Daniel Lawrence Lurie; February 4, 1977 (age 49) San Francisco, California, U.S.
- Party: Democratic
- Spouse: Becca Prowda (m. 2006)
- Children: 2
- Relatives: Mimi Haas (mother); Peter E. Haas (stepfather)
- Education: Duke University (BA); University of California, Berkeley (MPP)

Daniel Lawrence Lurie (born February 4, 1977) is an American politician and philanthropist who is the 46th and incumbent mayor of San Francisco, serving since 2025. He was elected in 2024, defeating then-incumbent London Breed. He is the founder and former CEO of Tipping Point Community. He has become known for his use of social media as mayor.

== Early life ==
Daniel Lawrence Lurie was born and raised in San Francisco, the son of Mimi (née Ruchwarger) and Rabbi Brian Lurie. His parents divorced when he was two; his mother remarried Peter E. Haas, and his father remarried Caroline Fromm Lurie. Daniel is an heir to the Levi Strauss fortune through his stepfather, Peter, and is the first cousin once removed of outgoing New York congressman Dan Goldman, another member of the Levi Strauss family. Brian was executive director of the Jewish Community Federation of San Francisco.

Lurie has two brothers, Ari and Alexander, and one sister, Sonia. He attended the Town School for Boys and University High School in San Francisco before graduating with a Bachelor of Arts in political science from Duke University in 1999. After graduation, he worked on Bill Bradley's 2000 presidential campaign as a field organizer in Iowa.

== Career ==
In 2001, Lurie moved to New York City to work for the Robin Hood Foundation, founded by Paul Tudor Jones. In 2003 he returned to the Bay Area, earning a Master of Public Policy from the Goldman School of Public Policy at the University of California, Berkeley, in 2005; his thesis consisted of a business plan for a charitable foundation based on the Robin Hood model.

After he graduated, he founded the Tipping Point Community, which has raised over $500 million from private donors. Other founding members of the board were former football player Ronnie Lott, Katie Schwab Paige (daughter of Charles R. Schwab), and Chris James (founder of activist investment firm Engine No. 1). Tipping Point focuses on education, housing, employment, and family wellness.

Lurie was named by then-San Francisco mayor Ed Lee to lead the 2016 San Francisco Bay Area Super Bowl Bid Committee; after a successful bid, he was able to ensure that 25% of revenue was designated to local non-profits to help fight poverty. On November 16, 2019, Lurie stepped down as CEO of Tipping Point Community after 15 years of leading the organization, though remaining as chair of the board.

== 2024 San Francisco mayoral campaign ==
=== Overview ===
On September 26, 2023, Lurie launched his candidacy for mayor of San Francisco in the 2024 election, challenging incumbent mayor London Breed. A committee supporting his candidacy received a $1 million donation from his mother, Mimi Haas. A report by The San Francisco Standard concluded that this was possibly "the largest contribution to a committee in support or opposition of a candidate in San Francisco history." Other donors included Jan Koum (co-founder of WhatsApp) and biotech investor Oleg Nodelman, who each contributed $250,000 to the committee, which raised about $3.5 million in total by January 2024. Lurie won the November 5, 2024, general election, defeating incumbent mayor Breed.

=== Endorsements ===
Lurie is a moderate Democrat, and was endorsed by some Republican groups, such as the San Francisco Briones Society. The co-founder of this group, Jay Donde, said that Lurie was the only candidate who could deny being involved in the politics that led to the mess that the city is currently in. Lurie reacted to this endorsement by stating that he is a lifelong Democrat but welcomes the endorsement because he looks for support from anyone, and his goals are common sense and not political: improve safety, end homelessness, and shutting down open-air drug markets. Former San Francisco mayor and police chief Frank Jordan endorsed Lurie, saying that their political ideals aligned. For example, Lurie called for a fully staffed police department and sheriff's office during the 2024 election.

The San Francisco Chronicle editorial board endorsed Lurie, praising his balance of compassion and toughness on key policy issues. Its endorsement argued that Lurie's connections in San Francisco non-profit and philanthropic circles would be valuable assets to him as a first-time elected official in city government.

=== Campaign ===
Lurie is a centrist Democrat. Lurie's moderate views led him to gain support from the business community. Tech companies were influential in this mayoral race as they spent millions of dollars on candidates' campaigns for more centrist policies and thus benefited Lurie. Lurie campaigned on tough-on-crime policies. His campaign also criticized City Hall insiders for not building more housing and needing to provide both funding and staff for the police and sheriff departments. Lurie had family wealth, allowing him to contribute more than $8 million to his campaign. Also, his mother contributed more than $1 million to an independent committee that supported Lurie's mayoral campaign. Overall, Lurie's campaign raised more than $16 million.

Lurie's self-funding a majority of his campaign led some to see him as a political outsider competing with those in City Hall amid corruption and scandals. His campaign played into this view and focused on how he was an outsider with no government experience. The campaign centered on Lurie being a political newcomer with a business background, pitching himself as common-sense and accountable. Some people argued that Lurie won because of high public support for his policy issues and a lack of government experience, which is historic as Lurie was the first candidate to be elected mayor of San Francisco with no government experience since 1911. There was controversy over Lurie's lack of political experience and self-funding, with opponents critiquing Lurie for spending so much on his campaigns. For example, some critics said that Lurie was buying the election and was a "trust fund kid" relying on family wealth, while others said he was campaigning seriously to increase his name recognition.

=== Election ===
First-choice votes for the top five candidates were 26.3% for Lurie, 24.4% for incumbent mayor London Breed, 22.9% for Board of Supervisors President Aaron Peskin, 18.5% for former Supervisor Mark Farrell, and 2.9% for Supervisor Ahsha Safai. Lurie was the only top candidate who was an outsider to politics, never holding a position in local government. San Francisco mayoral elections use a ranked-choice voting system where voters rank candidates based on their order of preference. The election continues until one candidate has a majority of the votes. This is done by eliminating the candidate with the fewest votes and redistributing everyone's vote to their next-choice candidate. Lurie led all rounds of ranked choice voting with an ultimate 56% of votes for Lurie and 43% of votes for Breed. There were 14 rounds of counting. It took two days to validate the winner of San Francisco's ranked-choice voting system.

=== Expert analysis ===
San Francisco State University political science professor Jason McDaniel said this election represented change, with Lurie having never held political office but running a well-funded campaign, capitalizing on ranked-choice voting and focusing on how he would do things differently in office. Jim Ross, a veteran Bay Area Democratic strategist, said this was a billionaire election with high spending on campaigns.

== Mayor of San Francisco ==
Lurie's term began on January 8, 2025. He announced prior to his inauguration that his salary would be capped at $1 per year instead of the full $364,582 salary.

According to a San Francisco Chronicle poll released on May 11, 2026, 74% of respondents approved of Lurie's mayorship. Residents praised him for tackling cleanliness and crime while criticizing housing prices and the lack of shelters for the homeless. His approach to tackling day-to-day issues and streamlining rules and regulations has been largely popular, though some concerns have been raised about his efforts to concentrate power in the Mayor's office.

Lurie has become known for his use of social media to promote local businesses and San Francisco, drawing comparisons to social media influencers and inspiring other local politicians to post more videos on social media.

A September 2026 article in the San Francisco Standard raised concerns about the Mayor's office deleting or hiding public records such as communications between other elected official on sensitive topics, continuing a controversial practice of Lurie's predecessors. The city's Sunshine Ordinance Task Force, which oversees complaints, also had not met since June 2026 as the group does not have enough members for a quorum, and a new rule prohibits termed-out members from continuing on until replacements are confirmed.

=== Policy priorities and actions in office ===
Lurie's administration has created measures to speed up housing approvals, such as the family zoning plan, and has removed some legal barriers for builders and lowered costs for developments. His administration introduced legislation on February 25, 2025, to make the process of converting empty office buildings into housing simpler and has launched an online tracker of permits to increase transparency and speed up project timelines. In December 2025, Lurie opposed the construction of a controversial 25-story apartment complex (with 790 rental units, of which 86 would be affordable housing) with mixed retail on the lot of a Safeway in the Marina District.

Lurie set a goal of hiring 425 new police officers, sheriff's deputies, and 911 dispatchers within his first three years to reduce response times and ensure consistent neighborhood patrols to deter crime. On May 13, 2025, Lurie announced a "Rebuilding the Ranks" initiative is aimed at restoring baseline staffing across public safety agencies and reducing reliance on overtime. As of 2026, SFPD reported having cut hiring times in half.

Lurie has also committed to making local government more transparent and accountable. In February 2025, he launched a new permitting tracker to increase public visibility into city operations. Daniel Lurie signed a no-bid contract with OpenGov for the permitting system of San Francisco in October 2025 and hopes to extend it in 2026 through 2031. The contract was legal but did not follow best practices like a competitive bidding process when choosing a permitting vendor while overriding staff concerns about the software, as well as ethics concerns about the connections of the founders of OpenGov to the Luries' nonprofit Tipping Point.

In March 2025, his administration pledged to review nonprofit contracts to ensure public funds are being used effectively and to shift resources away from underperforming providers. In August 2026, Lurie began to overhaul contracts for homelessness contractors. That month, Lurie rejected most of the recommendations of a 'scathing' report produced by San Francisco's Civil Grand Jury released in June 2026 such as about the lack of data, transparency and accountability of nonprofit contractors.

In January 2026, Mayor Lurie announced free childcare to families earning less than $250,000 a year and subsidized child care for those earning less than $310,000.

In November 2026, all of San Francisco's ballot measures supported by Lurie passed easily including giving more power to the Mayor's office, raising the threshold for ballot initiatives to pass and funding public transportation.

=== Beya Alcaraz ===
On November 6, 2025, Lurie appointed Isabella "Beya" Alcaraz to fill the vacant District 4 seat on the San Francisco Board of Supervisors after the recall of Joel Engardio. Alcaraz had no previous experience in any elected legislative or appointed administrative position and at the time of her appointment, was one of the youngest and least experienced appointed board members in the last 30 years.

Between 2019 and early 2025, Alcaraz owned and managed a pet store. After her appointment to the board, various news outlets reported on her mismanagement of the pet store. The owner who took over the store from Alcaraz found dead pet animals in the store freezer and evidence of a rodent infestation throughout the store. Some of these issues had been identified by earlier inspections by the city's Department of Public Health and Animal Care and Control. There were also reports that Alcaraz had paid employees "under-the-table" and had reported personal expenses as business write-offs in order to avoid paying taxes.

On November 13, 2025, seven days after her appointment, Alcaraz resigned. In his statement announcing her resignation, Lurie said, "I regret that I didn't do more to make sure she could succeed." Lurie swore in City College of San Francisco trustee Alan Wong to replace Alcaraz on December 1, 2025.

== Personal life ==
In 2006, Lurie married Becca Prowda; they have a son and a daughter. In 2019, his wife was named Director of Protocol by California Governor Gavin Newsom. Lurie is Jewish. He is a member of Congregation Emanu-El, a Reform congregation.

According to the San Francisco Chronicle, Lurie's net worth was estimated to be between $8 and $47 million in February 2025.

Political offices
Preceded by London Breed	Mayor of San Francisco; 2025–present	Incumbent
