= Summify =

Defunct social news aggregator

- Headquarters: Vancouver, British Columbia, Canada
- Area served: Worldwide
- Founders: Mircea Paşoi; Cristian Strat
- Industry: News aggregation; Social media
- Website: summify.com
- Current status: Discontinued

Summify was a social news aggregator founded by Mircea Paşoi and Cristian Strat, two former Google and Microsoft interns from Romania. The service emailed its users a periodic summary of news articles shared from their social networks based on their relevance and importance. The platform supported Twitter, Facebook, and Google Reader accounts.

== History ==
In 2009, Paşoi and Strat created ReadFu, a plugin that provided a contextual summary and statistics of the target page of a hyperlink. In January 2010, ReadFu was accepted into the Vancouver-based start-up incubator Bootup Labs. On March 20, 2010 the service was renamed to Summify and a private beta began.

On August 11, 2010 Paşoi and Strat announced a new direction for the service. It would become a real-time social news reader that aggregates incoming news from social networks and displays articles by importance using social reactions. After some feedback that the users preferred article digests by email more than the real-time news reader version, Summify discontinued the news reader version.

In March 2011, Summify completed a Seed round, with investors including Rob Glaser, Accel Partners, and Stewart Butterfield.

Summify received coverage from various news and media outlets such as TechCrunch. It was also featured in various news platforms, such as Time, The Globe and Mail, Mashable, VentureBeat, Gizmodo, Lifehacker, and The Next Web.

Summify released a free app on the Apple App Store on July 8, 2011. The app allowed users to read their web summaries from iOS mobile devices.

Summify was acquired by Twitter on January 19, 2012. The service shut down soon after, on June 22, 2012.
