= Noah Glass =

American technology entrepreneur

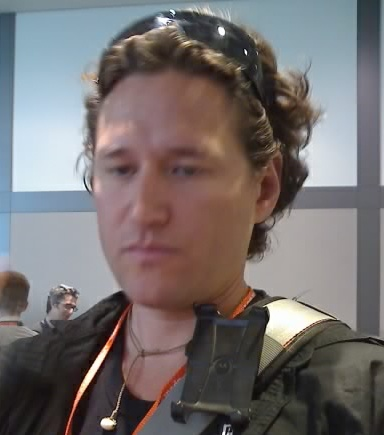
- Glass in 2007
- Occupation: Businessperson
- Known for: Co-founded Odeo and Twitter

Noah Glass is an American tech entrepreneur and software developer, who is known for co-founding the social media platform Twitter and Odeo, a podcasting company that shut down in 2017. Glass is credited for coining the name "Twitter", which began as "Twttr".

== Career ==
After leaving Industrial Light & Magic, Glass worked on several projects with Marc Canter, founder of MacroMind which later became Macromedia, birthplace of the Shockwave multimedia platform.

He later developed an app that allowed a user to enter an audio blog entry from a remote cell phone location. His small start-up, known as AudBlog, was eventually folded into a partnership with Evan Williams, of Blogger. The duo then created Odeo, a podcasting company.

In 2006, while with Odeo, Glass helped to create and develop the seed idea for what would eventually become known as Twitter, and he is acknowledged as being responsible for coining the name "Twitter", which began as the abbreviated version, "Twttr". In the book, Hatching Twitter, by Nick Bilton, Glass is given credit as being a Twitter co-founder, having helped realize the idea, and designing some of its core features.
