= Trendrr =

- Type: online services, web software, business intelligence, analytics
- Founded: 2007
- Headquarters: New York City, United States
- Website: www.trendrr.com

Trendrr is a New York–based digital and social media business intelligence platform that was acquired by Twitter in 2013.

A "virtual scratch pad" enables users to compare data sets and create mashups. Graphs can be shared with links or embed codes, or exported in xml, json, or excel. Trendrr allows users to make real-time actions based on quantitative and qualitative trends by understanding social media's impact on sales, savings and brand equity—three sources through which Trendrr enables users to track ROI.

== History ==
Wiredset, a digital marketing agency, created the first version of Trendrr called Infofilter in 2006. Infofilter pulled time-series data and pushed it into graphs and charts, without the interactive features such as mash-ups and scratch pad. The reporting function was manual, and access to the platform was deemed private.

As the demand for the platform expanded beyond specific client needs, Infofilter evolved into Trendrr in April 2007.

June 2009 saw the launch of Trendrr Pro, marking Trendrr's shift from a free service to a freemium model. In addition to the features included in the free version, Trendrr Pro allows users to track a greater number of data sets, receive unlimited alerts, and create custom reports. Users can also import their own data via Trendrr's API.

On August 28, 2013, it was announced that Trendrr was acquired by Twitter for an undisclosed amount.
