= Ned Segal =

Former chief financial officer of Twitter

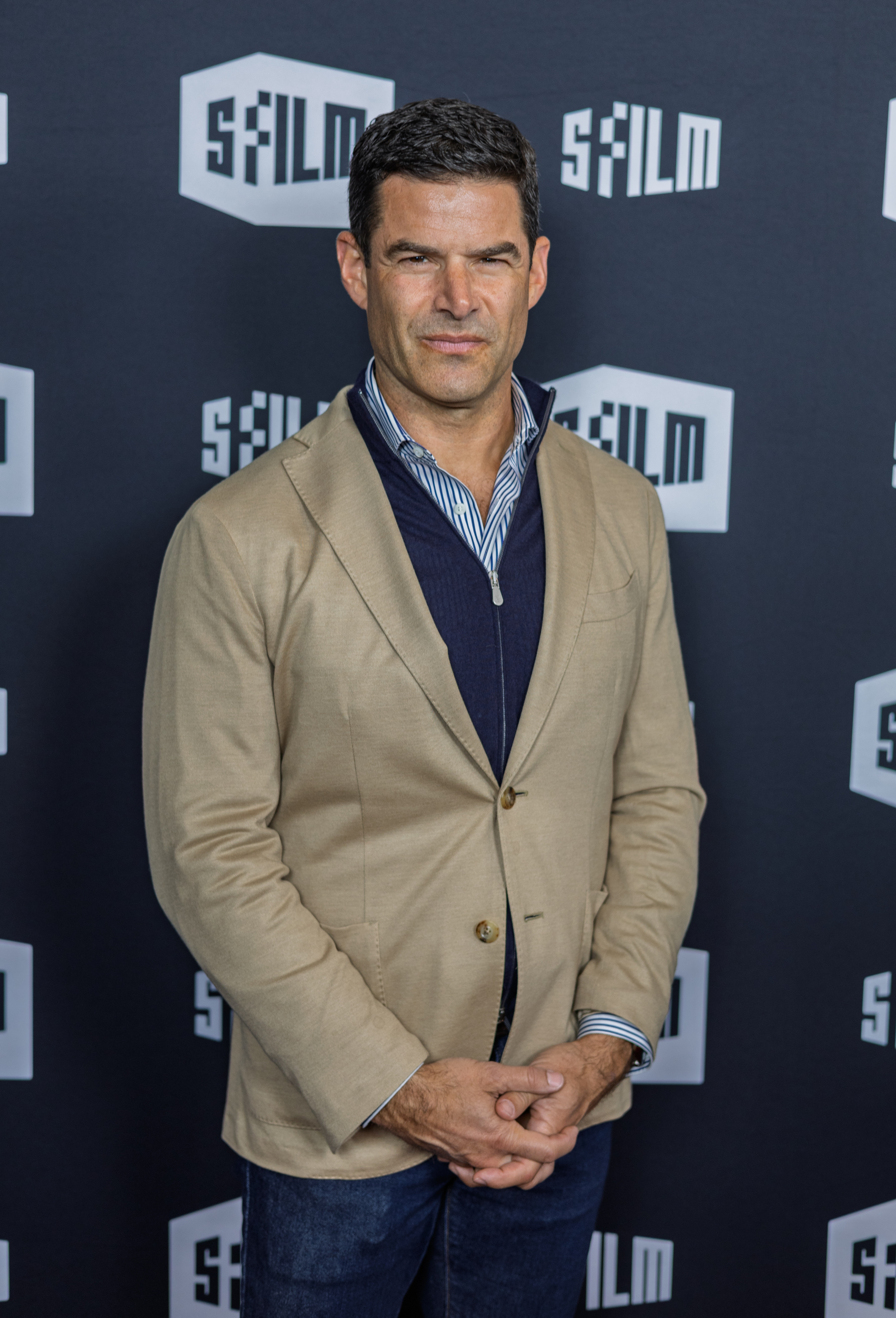
- Segal at the SFFILM Festival in 2026
- Born: c. 1974 (age 51–52)
- Education: Georgetown University (BS)
- Occupation: Business executive
- Children: 3

Ned Segal (born c. 1974) is an American business executive. He was the chief financial officer of Twitter from 2017 to 2022. He was fired, along with three other top executives, on October 27, 2022, following Elon Musk’s purchase of the company.

== Early life and education ==
Segal was born c. 1974. He graduated from Lick-Wilmerding High School in 1992 and earned a Bachelor of Science degree in Spanish from Georgetown University.

== Career ==
From 1996 to April 2013, Segal worked at Goldman Sachs including as the managing director and head of global software investment banking from 2009 to 2013. Segal was later the chief financial officer (CFO) of the RPX Corporation. Until 2017, Segal was the senior vice president of finance for the small business group at Intuit. In late August 2017, he succeeded Anthony Noto as the chief financial officer of Twitter. In late October 2022, Segal was one of several executives who were fired after the acquisition of Twitter by Elon Musk. He reportedly was and is entitled to a golden parachute worth US$44.5 million, but it has not been paid.

Segal has served on the corporate boards of Beyond Meat, Ring Central, and BostonGene. He was on the board of the non-profit Tipping Point Community.

In December 2024, Segal was named chief of housing and economic development by San Francisco Mayor-elect Daniel Lurie, one of four chiefs appointed by the mayor to help "improve interdepartmental collaboration and streamline the city's slow and complex bureaucracy."

== Personal life ==
Segal lives in San Francisco with his wife and three children.
