= Wiredset =

Online marketing firm

- Company type: digital agency
- Founded: 2004
- Founder: Mark Ghuneim, Tom Donohue
- Headquarters: New York City, United States
- Services: Marketing
- Website: wiredset.com

Wiredset LLC is an online marketing firm headquartered in New York City.

In 2006, Wiredset developed Trendrr (United States Patent no. 8,271,429, issued on Sept. 18, 2012), a tool for measuring trends across the web. Trendrr was acquired by Twitter in 2013.

In February 2010, Wiredset began selling Curatorr, a platform for managing comments on Twitter.
