= Video aggregator =

Website that organizes videos

A video aggregator is a website that collects and organizes online videos from other sources. Video aggregation is done for different purposes, and websites take different approaches to achieve their purpose.

Some sites try to collect videos of high quality or interest for visitors to view; the collection may be made by editors or may be based on community votes. Another method is to base the collection on those videos most viewed, either at the aggregator site or at various popular video hosting sites. Some other sites exist to allow users to collect their own sets of videos, for personal use as well as for browsing and viewing by others; these sites can develop online communities around video sharing. Still other sites allow users to create a personalized video playlist, for personal use as well as for browsing and viewing by others.
