= Namo Media =

Namo Media, Inc.
- Available in: English
- Founded: February 2013
- Headquarters: San Francisco, California, USA
- Founders: Gabor Cselle, Nassar Stoertz, Tural Badirkhanli
- Industry: Mobile advertising / Native advertising
- Website: http://www.namomedia.com/

Namo Media was a technology startup providing in-stream advertisements for mobile applications. It was acquired by Twitter in June 2014 for between $50M and $100M.

It was founded by former Google employees Gabor Cselle, Nassar Stoertz, and Tural Badirkhanli, who raised $1.9 million in seed funding from investors that included Google Ventures, Andreessen Horowitz, and Betaworks. Cselle had sold his previous startup reMail to Google in 2010. Namo Media's advertising SDK for Android and iOS allowed developers to integrate native advertising into applications with streams of content, and was the first to implement server-side location control of native ads. In April 2014, Namo Media launched ad carousel upgrade.

Namo Media's location control technology was integrated into Twitter's MoPub advertising solutions in October 2014.
