= Tipping Point Community =

American nonprofit organization

- Formation: 2005
- Founder: Daniel Lurie
- Type: Nonprofit organization
- Headquarters: San Francisco, CA, United States
- CEO: Sam Cobbs
- Revenue: $41.3 million (FY23)
- Expenses: $39.9 million (FY23)
- Website: tippingpoint.org

Tipping Point Community is a grant-making anti-poverty nonprofit organization based in the San Francisco Bay Area. It was founded by Daniel Lurie in 2005.

In 2017, Tipping Point committed $100 million to cut chronic homelessness in San Francisco in half by 2022. This initiative, in partnership with the City and County of San Francisco, aims to create housing, improve public systems like criminal justice and child welfare to reduce the rate of homelessness, and help the city leverage more state and federal funding.

Tipping Point is modeled after the Robin Hood Foundation in New York, and has been described as "an organization that aims to not only help the poor, but actively change the systems that put them there in the first place." In June 2017, Tipping Point raised over $25 million. Its board is composed of local philanthropists, including former San Francisco 49ers player Ronnie Lott. The board underwrites all fundraising and operating costs.

On November 16, 2019, Tipping Point Community announced that founder and CEO Lurie would step down after 15 years of leading the organization, though he remained with Tipping Point as chair of the board. Sam Cobbs, Tipping Point's president, succeeded Lurie as CEO on January 6, 2020.

== Special Initiatives ==
- The Mental Health Initiative - Launched in 2008. In partnership with UCSF and Stanford University, Tipping Point grantees receive a combination of direct services from clinical staff and post-doctoral interns, agency-specific training, and consultation. Since the initiative's inception, more than 800 families have been referred to services through the Tipping Point Mental Health Initiative. In addition, Tipping Point offers about ten trainings every year for frontline and supervisory staff on a variety of mental health topics, including the impact of trauma on academic achievement, motivational interviewing, and self-care.
- Since 2013, Tipping Point has invested in research and development to fill gaps in the nonprofit sector and develop new poverty-fighting ideas. Known as T Lab, this R+D team exists to research, prototype, and test in partnership with Tipping Point grantees and the community at large.
- In October 2017, the Northern California Firestorm destroyed over 8,000 structures throughout Napa, Sonoma and Lake counties, displacing tens of thousands of people. Working with Bay Area enterprises including Salesforce, Twilio, San Francisco Giants, Another Planet Entertainment, and Live Nation, Tipping Point produced the Band Together Bay Area benefit concert. Featuring Metallica, Dead & Company, Dave Matthews and Tim Reynolds, G-Eazy, Raphael Saadiq and Rancid, the concert raised $17 million to support North Bay nonprofits serving low-income victims of the fires. As of January 2018, $32 million has been raised for the Tipping Point Emergency Relief Fund.
