= Super angel =

Term for venture capitalists who invest early

Super angel (or "super-angel") was a term used in the early 2010s to describe venture capital investors who had once been angel investors and subsequently raised small venture capital funds.

Super angels share some characteristics of both angel investors and venture capitalists. According to Fast Company, super angels "raise funds like venture capitalists but invest early like angels and in sums between the two, on average from $250,000 to $500,000." Unlike traditional angel investors, they are typically professionals for whom investing is their primary occupation.

== Features ==
Some common features of super angels include:

- Creating a professionally managed investment fund
- Serial investing (investing in numerous startup companies)
- Investing at a seed round in startup companies
- Funding rounds in the (approximate) range of $50,000 to several million dollars, larger than typical "friends and family" rounds but smaller than most venture rounds
- Taking an active role in portfolio companies
- Raising money from general partners and other principals, without passive investors in the fund
- Fund principals who are experienced entrepreneurs
- Avoid joining boards as a long-term investor.
- Close investments in several weeks, considerably faster than venture funds.

== List of investors described as super angels ==
Name of fund	Key people	Selected portfolio companies
Canvas Ventures	Rebecca Lynn, Paul Hsaio	LendingClub
500 Startups	Dave McClure	SlideShare, CrowdFlower, Udemy
Felicis Ventures	Aydin Senkut	Meraki, Mint.com
Floodgate Fund	Mike Maples Jr., Ann Miura-Ko	Chegg, Dasient, Digg, Twitter
Founder Collective	Caterina Fake, Chris Dixon, David Frankel, Eric Paley, Micah Rosenbloom	Uber, Coupang, Trade Desk, PillPack, SeatGeek
Founders Fund	Peter Thiel, Sean Parker, Ken Howery, Luke Nosek	Gowalla, Causes, Facebook, Quantcast, SpaceX, Spotify
Harrison Metal	Michael Dearing	AdMob, Lumosity, Aardvark
Lerer Hippeau Ventures	Kenneth Lerer, Ben Lerer	
Lowercase Capital	Chris Sacca	Twitter, bit.ly, Uber
Luminar Ventures	Magnus Bergman	Truecaller, Prezi
SoftTech VC	Jeff Clavier	Tapulous, RapLeaf
SV Angel	Ron Conway, David Lee, Mike Ghaffary, Brian Pokorny (former)	Google, Ask Jeeves, Facebook, BuzzFeed, PayPal
Thrive Capital	Joshua Kushner	Vostu
