= David Frankel (entrepreneur) =

South African-born American entrepreneur and venture investor

- Born: 1970 (age 55–56); Johannesburg, South Africa
- Education: Harvard University; University of the Witwatersrand
- Occupations: Entrepreneur; Venture investor Philanthropist
- Years active: 1993–present
- Title: Co-founder and managing partner, Founder Collective
- Website: foundercollective.com

David Frankel (born 1970) is a South African-born American entrepreneur, venture capitalist, and philanthropist. He is the co-founder of Founder Collective, a seed-stage venture capital fund with offices in New York City and Cambridge. He has been named to the Midas List of the world's best venture capital and seed stage investors nine times.

== Early life and education ==
Frankel was born and raised in Johannesburg. His paternal great-grandfather, Jacob Frankel, emigrated from Germany to South Africa in 1915 and in 1920 founded Tiger Oatery, a small milling company. His grandfather, Rudolph Leo Frankel, led the company as it expanded to become Tiger Brands, a South African conglomerate.

He attended King David High School, where he met his friend and future business partner, Alon Apteker. As adolescents, he and Apteker sold CDs and picture frames at a Johannesburg flea market. Frankel graduated from the University of the Witwatersrand with a BSc (honors) in Electrical Engineering in 1992.

== Career ==
=== Internet Solutions, Dimension Data ===
As a postgraduate, Frankel was selected for the US Foreign Fulbright Scholarship Programme and accepted to the MBA program at Harvard Business School. Twenty-two at the time, he deferred his admission and remained in Johannesburg to gain professional experience. In 1993, he accepted a job offer from Altech, a technology company, where he worked for the COO.

In March 1994, Frankel left Altech to join Internet Solutions as its CEO. He also made a significant investment in the company, which was co-founded in late 1993 by Ronnie Apteker, Alon Apteker's brother. He was noted for the "hard-nosed" approach he brought to Internet Solutions, which by 1997 had become the largest ISP and private data carrier in Africa, providing the internet backbone for more than 600 companies. Dimension Data (DiData) acquired 25% of Internet Solutions in 1995 and in 1997 acquired the remaining 75% of the company for ZAR 400 million. Following the sale, Frankel was appointed executive director of ecommerce for DiData. He later served on the company's board of directors and in 2000 participated in its £1.8bn IPO and listing on the London Stock Exchange. Dimension Data was acquired by Nippon Telegraph and Telephone in 2010 for US $3.24bn.

=== Harvard Business School, angel investments, Founder Collective ===
In 2001, after deferring admission twice, Frankel left Johannesburg to begin the MBA program at Harvard Business School. He maintained his seat on the DiData board of directors while at HBS, earning an MBA in 2003. Following his graduation, Frankel funded eight companies founded by his classmates, becoming the first investor in Chris Dixon's Site Advisor, and giving the first seed capital to Eric Paley and Micah Rosenbloom, the founders of Brontes. Brontes was sold to 3M for $95 million, and Site Advisor was acquired by McAfee for $75 million in 2005, a year after it was founded.

As an angel investor, he provided the first capital or term sheets for companies including OPower (acquired by Oracle), Media Radar, Volaris (NYSE: VLRS), New Dawn Satellite (acquired by Intelsat), and Context Optional (acquired by Adobe). He was a seed investor in TrialPay (acquired by Visa) and Hunch, founded by Dixon and acquired by eBay. He invested in Olo in 2004. The sole seed investor, he worked closely with the company’s founder, Noah Glass. The company went public in 2021 at a valuation of $3.2b.

In 2008, Frankel partnered with Paley and other successful entrepreneurs to form Founder Collective, a seed-stage "peer-to-peer" venture fund. Based in Cambridge and New York, Frankel, Paley, and several limited partners used their own money to help create the first fund. Rosenbloom joined Founder Collective as a partner in 2013. As of 2025, the company's portfolio included Uber (NYSE:UBER), TheTradeDesk (NYSE: TTD) and Airtable. Frankel was the lead investor for Founder Collective in SeatGeek, Coupang (NYSE: CPNG), and PillPack (acquired by Amazon), among others, and the first investor in Shield AI and Suno AI.

== Recognition and board positions ==
Frankel received the IT Executive of the Year award from the Computer Society of South Africa in 1998. In 1999, he was named Technological Achiever of the Century by the Financial Mail for his role in "turning the internet in South Africa into a commercial proposition" and "bringing a business approach to an industry previously dominated by people with technical backgrounds." The World Economic Forum admitted him to the Global Leader of Tomorrow (GLT) program.

Frankel has been named to the Midas List nine times; he was on the list of the world's best venture capital investors from 2022 through 2026 and on the list of top seed stage investors in 2013, 2024, 2025, and 2026.

Frankel was appointed to the board of directors of Rand Merchant Investment Holdings in 2018. He was previously a member of the Rand Merchant Bank board. He is on the board of directors for Olo and SeatGeek, among others. He serves on the Dean's Advisory Council at the Harvard Radcliffe Institute, and has participated on the boards of several non-profit organizations including The Rashi School in Boston, Foundation 2000, the King David Schools Foundation and Endeavor South Africa. He was an Entrepreneur-in-Residence at the Harvard Business School Rock Center.

== Advocacy and philanthropy ==
Frankel served as the founding co-chairman of the Internet Service Providers Association of Africa (ISPA); he held a central role in the 1997 lawsuit that kept Telkom from monopolizing internet access in South Africa. He helped to create Endeavor SA, the South African arm of the global nonprofit Endeavor, which provides support to entrepreneurs in developing countries and emerging markets.

In 2019, Frankel and his wife, Tracey Frankel, established the Tracey and David Frankel Chair in Urologic Oncology at Beth Israel Deaconess Medical Center. In 2021, they founded NextUp, a Johannesburg-based non-profit that expands opportunities for underserved youth in local communities by providing educational resources to prepare them for higher education and employment. In March 2026, NextUp, in partnership with Taddy Blecher and the Maharishi Institute, launched the Maharishi NextUp Institute of Technology, which teaches students in-demand skills identified by large companies as critically lacking. MNIT also provides students with training in communication, confidence, and workplace skills, as well as stipends, food assistance, transport, mentorship, and social support. The institute's 10-storey, 10,065m campus, located in Johannesburg's central business district, was donated by the Frankels.

== Personal life ==
David and Tracey Frankel, a neurologist, were married in 1998.

Frankel tested positive for COVID-19 in March 2020, He documented his experience on Twitter, stating in April that while the pandemic could bring innovation that would improve public health, there would likely be a trade-off in privacy.
