= Founder Collective =

American seed stage venture capital firm

- Type: Privately held company
- Industry: Venture capital
- Founded: 2009; 17 years ago
- Founders: David Frankel and Eric Paley
- Headquarters: Cambridge, MA and New York City, United States
- Key people: David Frankel; Micah Rosenbloom; Amanda Herson
- Services: Seed-stage investment capital
- Website: foundercollective.com

Founder Collective is an American seed stage venture capital company with offices in New York City and Cambridge, Massachusetts. Focused on early stage technology startups, FC has made seed investments in Airtable, Coupang, Uber, Shield AI, and The Trade Desk, among others. As of 2026, 25 of the startups Founder Collective has seeded have reached valuations of more than $1bn.

== History ==
Founder Collective was founded in 2009 by David Frankel, Eric Paley, and a combination of full-time partners and part-time founder-partners. The founder-partners continued to run their own startups while investing with FC.

Paley and Micah Rosenbloom, also a Founder Collective partner, co-founded and ran the dental imaging startup Brontes Technologies. Frankel, who founded Africa's largest ISP, Internet Solutions, was their first investor; he helped Paley and Rosenbloom build Brontes, which was acquired by 3M for $95 million in 2006. FC was designed to offer similar support: all of its VCs, who were successful founders before they were investors, work closely with the founders of its portfolio companies. Its mission at launch was to build "the most aligned fund for founders at seed stage".

== Business model, investments, and venture funds ==
Founder Collective often provides the first seed capital to the startups it backs. Its fund sizes are intentionally small, aligning it with founders through shared incentives such as minimizing dilution. The size of FC's investments also allow it to support exits of any size.

The first Founder Collective venture fund launched in 2009 with $40 million in committed capital. Sector-agnostic, the company's first seed investments were in Uber, PillPack, and Seat Geek, among others. Prior to its second raise of $70 million in 2012, Founder Collective was named to the Institutional Investor list of top super angels. FC had made seed investments in companies including Cruise Automation, a startup acquired by General Motors for a reported $1 billion, when its third fund of $75 million closed in 2016. A fourth fund of $85 million closed in 2021, and in 2023, with $95 million in capital commitments, Founder Collective raised its fifth and largest fund.

Amanda Herson joined Founder Collective as managing partner in 2023. In June 2025, Massachusetts governor Maura Healey appointed Paley Secretary of the Executive Office of Economic Development for the state of Massachusetts. He assumed the position in September.

== Recognition ==
Both Paley and Frankel have been named to the Forbes Midas List of the most influential and top performing venture capitalists in the world. Esquire described Founder Collective as a "Midas touch firm". Frankel has appeared on the Midas List nine times. Both Frankel and Paley have appeared on The Information's annual list of seed investors to watch and The Boston Globe's list of tech power players.

== Selected seed investments ==
- Airtable: A private cloud-based spreadsheet and database software company and no-code collaboration platform with a multi-billion dollar valuation.
- Coupang: A South Korean e-commerce and online retail company that debuted at a $84 billion valuation on the NYSE when it went public in 2021.
- PillPack: An online pharmacy startup that organizes and delivers medications acquired by Amazon for $1bn in 2018
- SeatGeek: An online ticket search and resale marketplace that remains private.
- Shield AI: A defense technology company developing AI-powered drones and software for military applications valued at approximately $2.7 billion in 2023.
- Suno AI: A generative AI music creation startup founded in 2023 and valued at $5.4 billion in 2026.
- The Trade Desk: An advertising technology company that went public in 2016.
- Uber: A ride-hailing and transportation platform that went public in 2019 and was valued at more than $95 billion in 2025.
- Venmo: A peer-to-peer payment platform acquired by PayPal for $800 million in 2013.
- Verkada: A private security and enterprise surveillance technology company with a multi-billion dollar valuation in 2025.
- WHOOP: A wearable technology company valued at more than $3.6bn in 2021.
