= IBRIDGES =

Annual convention for the Iranian diaspora

iBRIDGES
- Status: Active
- Genre: Entrepreneurship
- Inaugurated: 2014
- Organizer: Iranian diaspora
- Website: http://ibridges.org

iBRIDGES is an annual convention for Iranian diaspora to meet with Iranian entrepreneurs and business people. The primary goal of the convention is to bridge the gap between the Iranian high-tech start-ups and western investors. The discussions in this convention are intended to primarily focus on entrepreneurship opportunities in Iran's tech industry rather than its internal or foreign policies.

The 2014 convention in UC Berkeley attracted more than 700 Iranian high-tech executives and entrepreneurs. The 2015 convention in Berlin is called "the largest gathering of Iranians outside the country in more than three decades". It was held from June 4-6, 2015 at the new Berlin CityCube convention center. The event included 117 sessions with 163 speakers, and 1,040 registered participants from 35 countries. Dave McClure, one of 2015 attendees, counts the large population of Iran and its educated population as potential for startups in the country. The official final and detailed report of the iBridge Berlin was released by organizer in October 2015.

The convention is also implicitly aimed at bridging the gap in international relationsship between Iran and western countries, especially at the time of diplomatic negotiations between Iran and western countries on Iran's nuclear program.

== Conferences ==
- 2014: Berkeley, California, United States
- 2015: Berlin, Germany
- 2016: Barcelona, Spain
- 2019: Toronto, Ontario, Canada

== See also ==
- Technology start-ups in Iran
- Venture capital in Iran
