= Wideo.co =

- Company type: Software as a service
- Founded: February 2, 2012; 14 years ago
- Headquarters: Buenos Aires, Argentina
- Area served: Worldwide
- Founders: Agu De Marco, Agus Esperon
- Website: www.wideo.co

Wideo is an online video creation platform that enables users to create, edit, and share online videos. Wideo's platform allows individuals who do not have previous video making or design experience to create explainer videos, animated presentations, video e-cards and more.

Users can choose (or upload their own) images, backgrounds, and sounds in order to create their own personalized video. That video can then be shared on social networks or embedded in websites or blogs.

Wideo provides its users with a library of elements, objects, and fonts. Users can drag-and-drop elements into place in the Wideo editor then set the sequence of animations within their specific scenes. Each element can be re-used and the timing of the animation of each image can be individually adjusted.

Wideo offers its services on a freemium income model, where customers can use the tool and share or embed their videos free of charge. However, should the user wish to remove the Wideo watermark branding, or download the video directly to their computer, they can choose between three paid packages.

== History ==
Wideo was founded in 2012 by Agu De Marco and Agus Esperon. The idea originated from Agu's need to create an explanatory video for one of his other business ventures. With a small budget and close to no experience, De Marco noted an issue he felt existed in the online video creation marketplace: either pay a professional company a large fee to create it, or use complicated software that is time consuming to learn and use. He co-founded Wideo with the idea of making a simple tool that enables people without previous knowledge or training to create quality online videos, in a cost-effective way.

The company seeks to provide an alternative to presentation programs like Microsoft PowerPoint, while helping users capitalize on the wider growth of online video. According to the Cisco Visual Networking Index, consumer Internet video traffic will represent 69% of all consumer Internet traffic in 2017, up from 57% in 2012.

In May 2012, Wideo won a place on the Mission Silicon Valley initiative, as the City of Buenos Aires and General Directorate of Foreign Trade of the Ministry of Economic Development selected 12 startups to attend TechCrunch Disrupt in Silicon Valley later that year.

In June 2012, Wideo won the Innovation and Technology award at BBVA Open Talent & Red Innova 2012 in Madrid.

In July 2013, Wideo was selected to be accelerated by 500 Startups, the business incubator run by angel investor, Dave McClure.

In late July 2013, Wideo was selected to be accelerated by business incubator NXTP Labs.

In 2013, Wideo won the Best Product award at the GeekFantasy Camp in Santiago, Chile.
