= Sf.citi =

Nonprofit Organization

sf.citi
- sf.citi logo
- Formation: 2012
- Type: Nonprofit Organization
- Headquarters: San Francisco, California
- Region served: United States
- Key people: Rebecca Prozan, Board Chair Kate O'Sullivan, Vice Chair Alex Tourk, Public Policy Lead Hayden Anderson, Policy Advisor Erika Jones-Clary, Communications & Web Design
- Website: www.sfciti.org

sf.citi, founded in 2012, is a 501(c)6 nonprofit organization that lobbies for public policies on behalf of San Francisco's tech community. sf.citi's membership consists of the world's foremost tech companies, including Microsoft, Google, Meta, LinkedIn, Twitter, Comcast, AT&T, Verizon, Airbnb, Lyft, Uber, Cruise, and Salesforce. The organization's work falls into three primary categories: political advocacy, corporate social responsibility, and events with the broader San Francisco community.

== Board of directors ==
The sf.citi Board of Directors includes representatives from San Francisco's technology and business/nonprofit industries. They work closely with the sf.citi team in directing sf.citi's policy agenda and organizational development.

=== Board of directors ===
Rebecca Prozan, Director of West Coast Government Affairs and Public Policy for Google, serves as the Board Chair on the sf.citi Board of Directors.

Kate O'Sullivan, General Manager of Industry and External Affairs in the Corporate, External and Legal Affairs Department within Microsoft, serves as the Vice Board Chair on the sf.citi Board of Directors.

The other sf.citi board members include the following:

- Vikrum Aiyer, Vice President of Global Public Policy and Strategic Communications at Postmates
- Dillon Auyoung, Director of Government Affairs at Comcast
- Cammy Blackstone, Director of External Affairs in San Francisco for AT&T
- Rob Grant, Vice President of Government Affairs at Cruise Automation
- Jim Green, Senior Vice President of Government Affairs and Public Policy at Salesforce
- Michael Matthews, California Director of Public Policy at Facebook
- Steve Sarner, Vice President Ad Sales and Program Management at Goodreads (Amazon)

=== Emeritus sf.citi board members ===
The following previously served on the sf.citi Board of Directors:

- Ron Conway, Founder of SV Angel
- Amy Banse, Managing Director and Head of Funds for Comcast Ventures
- Marc Blakeman, Vice President of External Affairs for AT&T
- Kimberly Bryant, Founder and Executive Director of Black Girls Code
- Carmela Clendening, former Director of State and Local Government Affairs at Salesforce
- Regina Evans, Senior Director of Government Affairs at Comcast
- Jared Friedman, Partner at Y Combinator and co-founder and CTO of Scribd
- Heather Harde, former CEO of TechCrunch
- Burke Norton, Principal at Vista Equity Partners
- Hosain Rahman, Founder and CEO of Jawbone Health

== Advocacy ==
=== Prop E ===
sf.citi lobbied for the passage of Proposition E - San Francisco Gross Receipts Tax on Businesses on the November 2012 San Francisco ballot. Passing with 71% of the public vote, Proposition E phased out the city's payroll tax over five years and replaced it with a gross receipts tax for businesses in selected revenue brackets. Many of the city's business advocates and tech companies claimed that the city's payroll tax was a deterrent to job growth. Proposition E would shift the tax burden from 10% to 90% of San Francisco's businesses and generate an estimated $28.5 million in annual revenue to the city.

Among its advocacy efforts in favor of Proposition E, sf.citi circulated a video for Yes on E. The video featured Twitter chairman Jack Dorsey, Airbnb CEO Brian Chesky, and Twitter and Obvious Corp. co-founder Biz Stone. The video was featured on Youtube's homepage.

=== Tech Shuttle Buses ===
In 2014, sf.citi became involved in San Francisco Municipal Transportation Agency's (SFMTA) pilot shuttle program. The program allowed tech companies to transport employees to and from San Francisco and their corporate campuses in Silicon Valley via shuttle buses. In response to opposition, sf.citi organized its members and supporters to attend key board of supervisors meetings and send letters to their supervisors in support of the shuttles. In 2017, the SFMTA Board of Directors voted unanimously to make the Commuter Shuttle Program permanent.

=== Tech Tax ===
In the summer of 2016, sf.citi coordinated a group of business and tech leaders, including Google and Salesforce, to challenge District 1 Supervisor Eric Mar's "Tech Tax" – a ballot measure that would impose a 1.5% payroll tax on tech companies in San Francisco with gross receipts over $1 million. The proposed measure did not make it out of committee. On August 1, 2016, the ballot measure lost in a 2-1 vote during a Budget and Finance Committee hearing, with both District 2 and District 4 Supervisors Mark Farrell and Katy Tang voting to table it.

=== Sidewalk Delivery Robots ===
In 2017, District 7 Supervisor Norman Yee proposed legislation to prohibit autonomous delivery devices on San Francisco sidewalks, citing concerns around pedestrian safety. sf.citi pushed back against the proposed ordinance, advocating for a compromise between the San Francisco Board of Supervisors and the tech companies that would be affected by the ban. The initial ordinance was sent back to committee three times for amendments over the course of almost a year. Instead of an outright ban on all sidewalk delivery robots, the board of supervisors agreed, at the end of 2017, to develop a permit process allowing select companies to test courrier bots around the city. The permits went into effect in March 2018.

=== Artificial Intelligence and the Future of Work ===
In 2017, District 6 Supervisor Jane Kim pushed for a "robot tax" by launching a statewide campaign called Jobs of the Future Fund. Kim proposed extending a payroll tax to robots that "perform jobs humans currently do." Revenue generated from the tax would fund workforce development programs for workers displaced by automation. In response to Kim's campaign, sf.citi released a report, "Taxing Innovation: The Challenge of Regulating Job Automation," which aggregated research on automation and the future of work. The paper concluded that "[r]obots will change the way we work, but they can't replace us." The sf.citi report also offered three recommendations for legislators to consider as they explore future regulation around automation. A "robot tax" has not been carried forward at either the state or local level.

=== Government Broadband Network ===
In early 2017, the late Mayor Ed Lee and his interim successor, Mayor Mark Farrell, commissioned a report outlining how the City of San Francisco could develop a citywide network to provide fiber-based Internet service to all San Francisco residents. Intended to bridge the digital divide with some 100,000 San Franciscans without home internet, the proposal was estimated to cost the city between $1.9 and $2.5 billion. At a hearing in May 2018, sf.citi argued that, while "well-intentioned," homelessness and housing are more urgent issues for San Francisco. Mayor Farrell did not pursue a revenue initiative for the project on the November 2018 ballot. Since he was replaced by Mayor London Breed in the June 2018 election, the Request for Proposals needed to implement the city-run internet service, was put on hold as the city conducts further research.

== Corporate social responsibility ==
sf.citi leads two corporate social responsibility programs, Circle the Schools and Future Grads, which connect San Francisco-based companies and the community around them.

=== Circle the Schools ===
Circle the Schools is an initiative started by sf.citi in collaboration with the San Francisco Unified School District and the San Francisco Education Fund, that engages local companies to partner with and "adopt" San Francisco public schools. The purported goal of these evolunteer partnerships is to ensure that the future workforce will have the necessary skills, experience, and resources needed to thrive. To date, Circle the Schools companies have circled 65 schools, provided over 21,092 volunteer hours, and donated over $803,035 in resources.

=== Future Grads ===
Created by sf.citi, the Future Graduates program is a partnership with the San Francisco Police Foundation that offers high-school students in San Francisco an eight-week paid internship at a local nonprofit or tech company.

== One City Forum ==
sf.citi's One City Forum is a quarterly event series aimed at uniting various sectors in tackling important challenges facing San Francisco. Launched in 2016, the One City Forum allows the tech community to engage with local nonprofits and community leaders on issues affecting both the Bay Area and the tech industry at large.

Past events have included "The Case for Corporate Social Responsibility," "The Techies Project Launch Party," "Tech Votes","One City Standing Together" and "We Are San Francisco".

The One City Forum is composed of nine volunteer members–four senior leadership representatives from the tech industry and five senior leadership representatives from a local nonprofit. The Forum members meet regularly to discuss difficult issues facing San Franciscans and plan events that further those discussions, as well as build partnerships between tech and the broader community.

Sherilyn Adams, Executive Director of Larkin Street Youth Services and Tiffany Apczynski, Vice President of Public Policy and Social Impact at Zendesk, are the current One City Forum co-chairs.

Other Forum members include Erin Felter, Executive Director of Okta for Good, Katie Ferrick, Director of Community Affairs at LinkedIn, Charlie Hale, Head of Global Public Policy & Social Impact at Pinterest, Amy Lebold, VP HR & Recruiting and Head of People at AdRoll Inc., Ashley McCumber, CEO of Meals on Wheels San Francisco, Tomiquia Moss, CEO of Hamilton Families, and Abby Snay, CEO of Jewish Vocational Service.
