= David Lee (investor) =

American angel investor

- Education: Johns Hopkins University, Stanford University, New York University
- Occupation: Angel investor
- Title: Co-founder of SV Angel
- Spouse: Grace Lee
- Children: 2

David Lee (born July 7) is an American angel investor. Lee is best known for his former role at angel investment firm SV Angel, where he was the managing partner for several years. Lee's departure from SV Angel in May 2015 was widely reported and acrimonious, while investor and SV Angel partner, Ron Conway told fund investors that "Lee had breached his trust." Lee was named on Forbes Magazine's Midas list for the years 2014, and 2015.

== Early career ==
Lee received his bachelor's degree from Johns Hopkins University, his master's degree from Stanford University, and a Juris Doctor from New York University.

Lee joined Google in 2003, and was a founding member of Google's New Business Development Team. David later joined Steve Anderson's Baseline Ventures, before joining Ron Conway's SV Angel in 2007. In 2012, Ron Conway announced that SV Angel was "David's fund". Lee made the news in December 2012, when he left Silicon Valley to move to Los Angeles, while still continuing his role as managing partner of SV Angel.

Lee's separation from Conway and SV Angel was abrupt and led many to speculate that it was acrimonious and "not as amicable as the March memo made it appear". Although Conway previously stated that it was "David's Fund," Lee's departure was to be "effective immediately" and was announced in a "terse memo" from Conway with no quote from Lee. "It is extremely rare for a sole managing partner to resign in the first place, and virtually unheard of without some sort of transition period." Furthermore, Fortune magazine reported that Conway, in private conversations with fund investors "did tell LPs that he believed Lee had breached his trust" primarily because, "according to what Conway told limited partners, Lee had effectively paid himself more than SV Angel's $250,000 annual salary cap."

== Investing ==
David Lee was ranked an eighty-fourth place in the Forbes magazine Midas list of top "dealmakers".

Lee was involved along with other angel investors in the Angelgate scandal of 2010. Notably, Lee's role in the Angelgate meetings was publicly criticized by his partner at the time, Ron Conway: "I regret David Lee was involved in the gatherings. I am sure he does too." Conway's criticism of Lee's role was in response to angel investor Dave McClure's comment about the double standard of Conway's criticism of the Angelgate meetings when in fact, Lee, his partner at SV Angel, was in attendance: "Ron is throwing us under a bus. and it’s chickenshit that he writes that after David Lee comes to both meetings.”

=== List of investments ===
During Lee's tenure as the managing partner of SV Angel, the firm made investments such as:

- DoorDash
- Opendoor
- Product Hunt
- Snapchat
- Zenefits

== Philanthropy ==
Lee serves on the Board of Directors of the Lucile Packard Foundation for Children's Health.
