= SV Angel =

American venture capital firm

SV Angel Management LLC
- Type: Private
- Industry: Venture Capital
- Founded: 2009; 17 years ago
- Founders: Ron Conway; David Lee
- Headquarters: San Francisco, California, U.S.
- Website: svangel.com

SV Angel Management LLC (SVA) is an American venture capital firm based in San Francisco, California. The firm focuses on investments related to the AI, software and IT sectors.

== Background ==
Until mid-2009, Ron Conway made most of his investments through Baseline Ventures. He and David Lee launched SVA in 2009 that focused on seed funding. Its first fund raised $10 million.

Lee was in attendance at the super angels meeting that sparked Angelgate in September 2010. Conway wrote a letter condemning the group and citing disappointment Lee was in attendance. He stated SVA has always been a friend of entrepreneurs and focuses its business to help them.

In January 2011, it was reported that SVA would partner with DST Global to launch the Start fund which would be managed by Lee. It would invest in every single Y Combinator startup with an offer of $150,000 in convertible debt.

In May 2012, Conway stated that SVA was Lee's fund and that he had turned over control to him This was supported by SEC filings that showed Lee owned over 75% of SVA since March 2010.

In May 2015, SVA announced that Lee would be leaving SVA. This was considered unexpected in the industry given it was rare for a sole managing partner to resign in the first place especially when done immediately. According to Fortune, there was a deterioration of relationship between Conway and Lee. Conway felt Lee did not spent as much time in Silicon Valley as promised when he left to move to Los Angeles in late 2012. In addition early 2015, Lee told Conway he didn't want to be involved in SVA's next angel fund due to disputes over 'time and place' as well as Lee wanting to focus on investing in SVA non-core sectors such as healthcare. The final straw was when Conway looked into SVA's structure and found that Lee had paid himself more than SVA $250,000 annual salary cap via a fee waiver. Conway considered this a betrayal from Lee. Both sides eventually reached a confidential separation settlement where Lee agreed to indirectly repay of some of disputed fee proceeds. In November 2017, Lee sued Conway alleging that he was violating terms of the settlement agreement.

In June 2018, SVA stated that it will not be raising new funds from outside investors and instead Conway will be investing with his own money. As a result, the investments allocated to each company would be smaller.

In March 2022, it was reported that SVA had raised raised $269 million for its first-ever growth equity fund. This was seen as a shift in strategy for SVA which previously used SPVs to invest in later-stage deals. It also was considered a reversal of its 2018 pledge to stop raising money from outside investors.

Notable investments made by SVA include Facebook, Twitter, Airbnb, Pinterest and Snapchat.
