= Brontes Technologies =

- Industry: Digital dental impression system
- Founded: 2003
- Headquarters: United States

Brontes Technologies, Inc. was a startup company that produced a digital dental impression system brought to market by 3M as The Lava Chairside Oral Scanner C.O.S. The Lava C.O.S. provides a powerful connection and improved productivity for a doctor and their dental lab thereby enabling the needed input to mass customized lab production in the dental market.

== History ==
Brontes Technologies, Inc. was born in 2003 out of the research of Massachusetts Institute of Technology lecturer Janos Rohaly (Chief Scientist), professor Douglas Hart, and two graduate students from the MIT Department of Mechanical Engineering, Federico Frigerio and Sheng Tan. After three years of research, the inventing team received a grant from Deshpande Center for Technological Innovation at MIT to shift the focus of its work toward commercial opportunities.

In Autumn 2002, the inventing team recruited co-founders Eric Paley as CEO and Micah Rosenbloom as COO, both Harvard Business School students, to evaluate the commercial potential of the technology, develop a business plan and raise capital. In May 2003, the combined team was selected as the runner-up in the MIT 50K and Harvard Business School Business Plan Competitions. Brontes Technologies was incorporated in June 2003 and identified the dental market as its business focus on the summer of 2003. The company was funded in 2004 by David Frankel, Flybridge Capital, Charles River Ventures, and Bain Capital Ventures.

== Innovation ==
Brontes Technologies innovated 3D-In-Motion technology which allowed the dentist to scan the inside of the mouth by moving an instrument above the teeth and capturing accurate high resolution data in real-time.

In October 2006, Brontes Technologies was acquired by 3M Company for $95 million and the product was launched to the dental market in 2007.

== See also ==
- Comfort Dental
