= Rebecca Lynn (venture capitalist) =

American venture capitalist

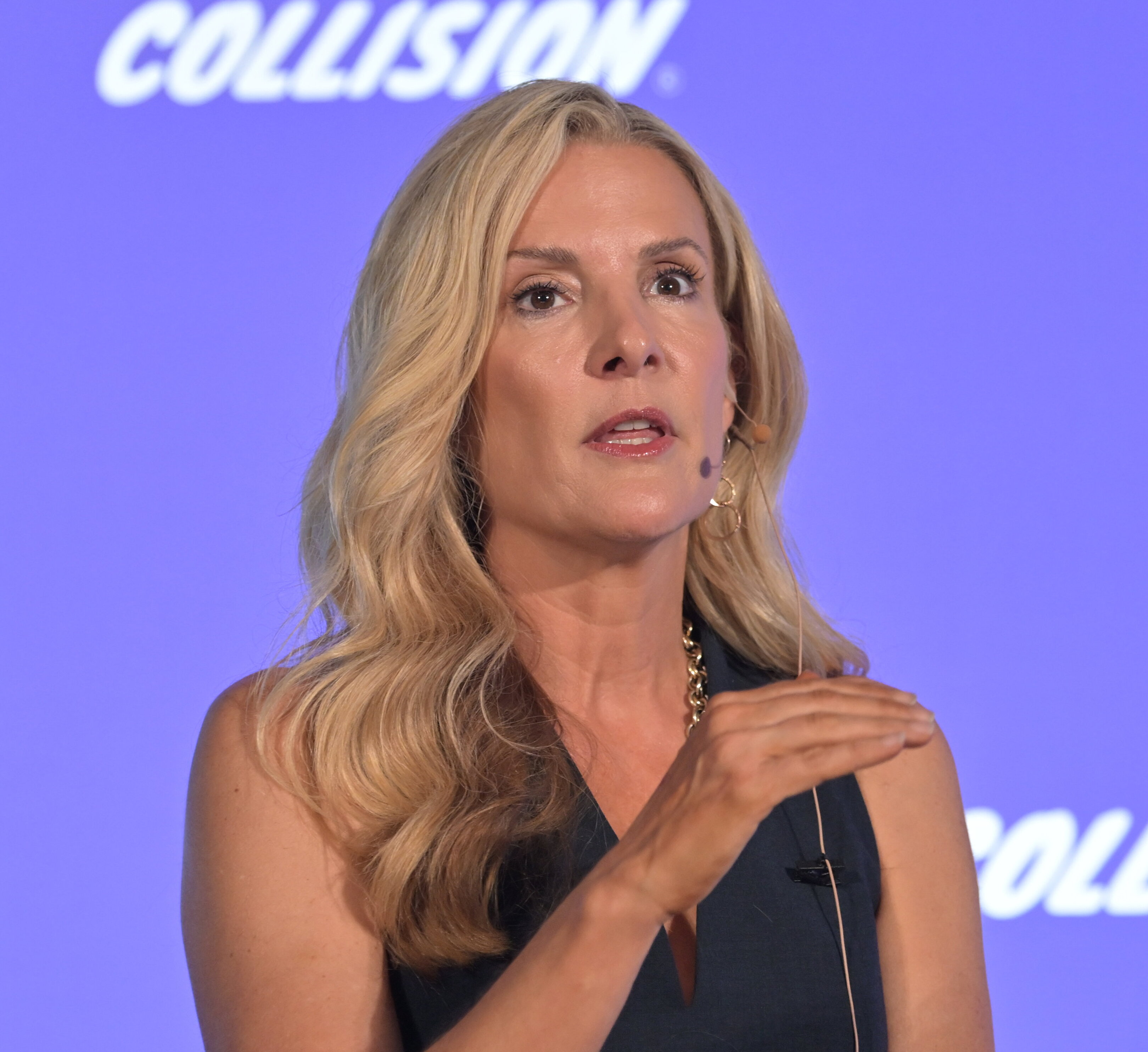
- Lynn in 2023
- Education: University of California, Berkeley; University of Missouri
- Occupation: Venture investor
- Years active: 2007-present
- Title: Co-founder and Managing Director, Canvas Prime

Rebecca Lynn is an American venture capitalist. She is the co-founder and managing director of Canvas Prime, an early-stage investment firm based in Portola Valley, California.

Lynn grew up in a small town in Missouri. She was a first-generation college student. She holds a chemical engineering degree from the University of Missouri and a JD/MBA from UC Berkeley.

Lynn worked at Procter & Gamble after completing her bachelor's degree. In 1998, she moved to Silicon Valley, where she was an early employee of NextCard.

She began her investment career at Morgenthaler Ventures in 2007. She became a partner in 2012. In 2013, she co-founded Canvas Ventures, a VC firm spun out from Morgenthaler. Her first early stage investment was in Lending Club. In December 2014 Lending Club went public. It was the largest U.S.tech IPO of the year, with the stock trading up 56% in its first day. Lynn was appointed to the board of directors following her initial investment.

She has been recognized by the Wall Street Journal and the New York Times, She appeared on the Midas List five years in a row. In 2022 she was the top female investor in the history of the Midas List, which was first published by Forbes in 2001.
