= QOOP =

Defunct web services company in California, USA

- Founded: 2005
- Founders: Andrew Gilmore, Bill Murray, Phil Wessells
- Defunct: 2012
- Headquarters: United States

QooP was a print-on-demand company founded in Mill Valley, California in 2005. They provided print-on-demand services with web integration via their website qoop.com. Starting in 2006, QooP was the primary provider of print editions of educational texts on Rice University's Connexions platform. They closed their doors in 2012.

== qoop.com ==
The QooP website provided tools for uploading documents, images, and blogs; compiling them into calendars, books and other products; and printing the result. In addition to printing, users could use their tools to create a store with listings of their digital content that they could share to friends and networks online. They also provided print-on-demand services for digital publishers that did not have their own print divisions.

In early 2012, the company announced revenues were flagging and they were looking for a buyer. In June 2012 they stopped accepting new orders and stated they would complete outstanding orders and then shut down permanently.

=== Partners and services ===
QooP launched with a partnership with Flickr, and later added a Facebook app, to make it easy to print and ship photos from those sites.

By 2006, QooP had become closely associated with open-source and Creative Commons communities that were building their own repositories for digital texts. Rice University's Connexions, the largest repository for open educational works at the time, partnered with them as the exclusive provider of print editions of their books. QooP later formed similar partnerships with open-content publishers including the CK-12 Foundation, Stanford University Press, and the Public Library of Science.
