= Hunch (website) =

Recommendation website

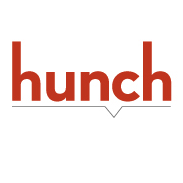
- Type: Subsidiary
- Industry: Recommender system
- Founded: 2007
- Founder: Caterina Fake and Chris Dixon
- Defunct: March 2014
- Fate: 2011: acquired by eBay; 2014: tech subsumed in eBay platform
- Headquarters: New York City, United States
- Parent: eBay
- Website: hunch.com

Hunch was an American company founded in 2007 that offered product recommendation, through its proprietary website, based on users' interest. Hunch launched its website in June 2009. In November 2011, Hunch was acquired by eBay for US$80 million (equivalent to $114.5 million in 2025).

While the technology continues to be used in eBay's e-commerce platform, the public facing website for Hunch was shuttered in March 2014.

== History ==
Hunch was co-founded in 2007 by Caterina Fake (co-founder of Flickr), and Chris Dixon, working with a small team of eight fellow "MIT nerds with backgrounds in computer science and math". The operation, headquartered in New York City, developed a website that offered product recommendations based on users' interest.

Hunch started a private preview period in December 2008, with a private beta in March 2009. Hunch launched its website in June 2009.

In December 2009, Wikipedia co-founder Jimmy Wales joined Hunch.com as a board member and advisor.

In February 2010, the website had 1.2 million unique visitors. In January 2011, Hunch was redesigned from decision tree system and topic specific questions to tagging and product referral.

In November 2011, Hunch was acquired by eBay Inc. for US$80 million (equivalent to $114.5 million in 2025). eBay planned to use Hunch's recommendation engine technology to improve how their own e-commerce platform offered users items to purchase. Specifically, eBay intended to use the Hunch technology to make non-obvious purchase suggestions.

After its acquisition by eBay, co-founder Chris Dixon remained as head of the operating business within eBay. eBay merged the approximately 20 employees at Hunch with the approximately 50 employees on the existing eBay data science team, under Dixon's department.

While the underlying recommendation engine technology remains in use at eBay, the public-facing website for the independent Hunch recommendation engine was closed in March 2014.
