= Jeff Green (businessman) =

American billionaire businessman (born 1977)

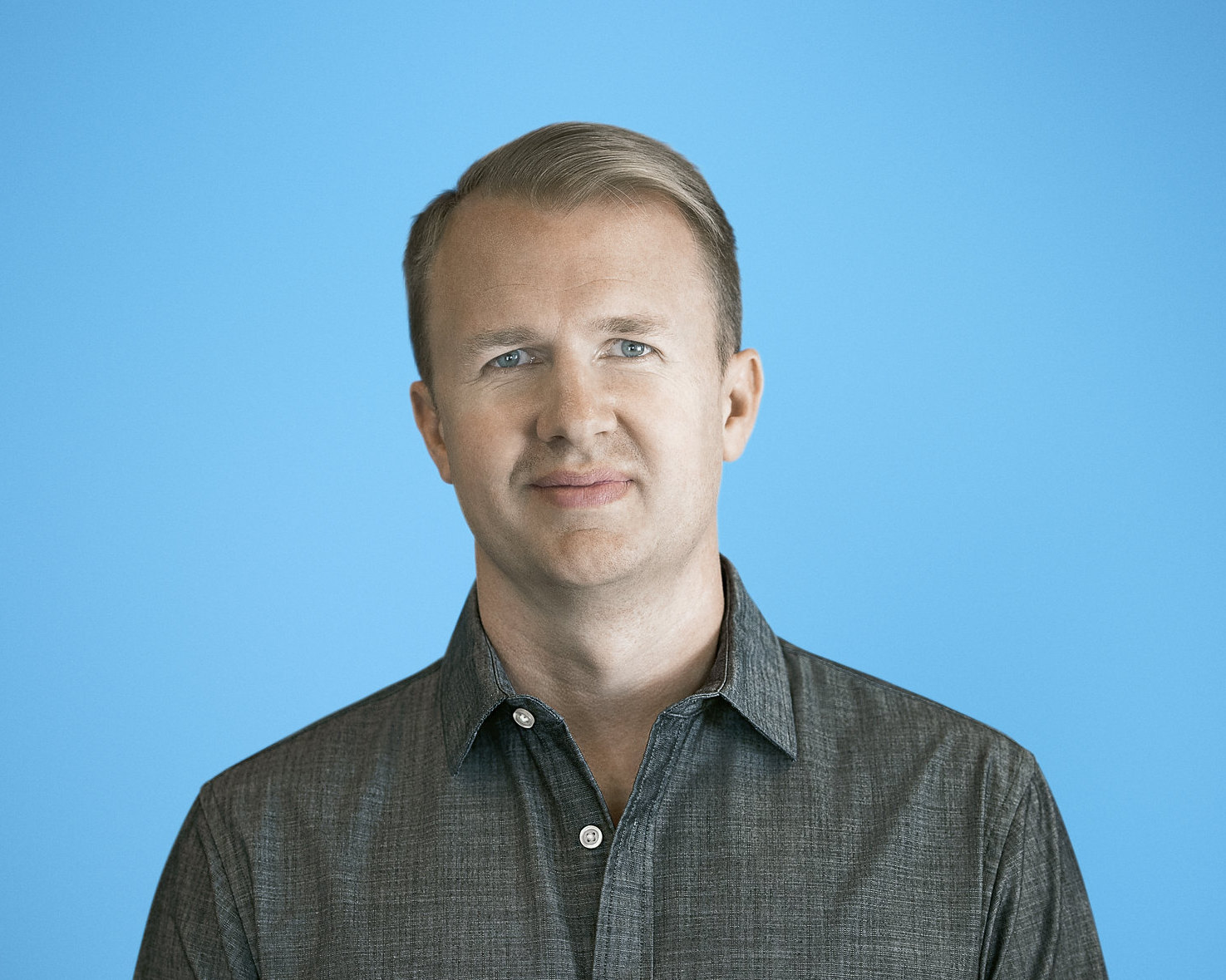
- Born: Jeffrey Terry Green; 1976 or 1977 (age 49–50)
- Education: Brigham Young University, University of Southern California
- Occupation: Businessman
- Known for: Co-founder, chairman and CEO of The Trade Desk; Co-founder of AdECN

Jeffrey Terry Green (born c. 1977) is an American billionaire businessman. He co-founded AdECN, a demand-side advertising platform, which was acquired by Microsoft in 2007. Following two years at Microsoft, Green co-founded the advertising exchange The Trade Desk, of which he is chairman and CEO.

== Early life ==
Jeff Green was born c. 1977 in Salt Lake City, Utah. Due to his father's work buying and selling businesses, Green's family moved often, living in Utah, Colorado, Kansas, Minnesota, and Rhode Island. Interested in technology and business, in his youth Green taught himself to code and build computers. He earned a bachelor's degree from Brigham Young University in 2001, with a major in English literature and a minor in marketing and accounting. He then earned a degree in marketing communications from the University of Southern California.

== Career ==
=== AdECN and Microsoft (2000-2008) ===
Green received his securities broker license after college, and subsequently spent a year working for an insurance company in investments. He also worked as a technical account manager in the MSN division of Microsoft, based in Salt Lake City. In 2001 he joined 411 Interactive, a digital advertising company, and worked as a digital media buyer. Around this time he founded two ad tech startups. One of them, AdECN, he launched in 2003 to bring programmatic trading to digital advertising. AdECN was the first demand-side advertising exchange service, functioning similarly to a stock market or commodities market.

Green sold AdECN to Microsoft in 2007, joining Microsoft and becoming COO of AdECN Exchange. Apart from overseeing AdECN, at Microsoft he advised on strategy for the Online Services Division and oversaw all of Microsoft's reseller and channel partner business, which included the monetization of "Facebook ads, Fox Sports, MSNBC, Hotmail and several other large Internet sites." He left Microsoft in 2009 to found a new company.

=== Founding The Trade Desk (2009-2020) ===
In 2009, Green co-founded The Trade Desk, a second-generation, programmatic advertising technology company, with fellow former Microsoft employee Dave Pickles. Based in Ventura, California with Green as CEO, the company operates a demand-side platform (DSP). After raising $120 million in venture capital, Green took The Trade Desk public in September 2016 on the Nasdaq. The IPO's opening day was reported to be “a huge vote of confidence for the demand-side platform,” and has since been cited as one of the best-performing stocks in the market, with its stock trading at nearly 14 times the IPO price less than three years later. The company acquired Adbrain in 2017. In 2020, The Trade Desk had a market value of $28.6 billion.

=== Recent years (2021-2025) ===
As both chairman and CEO of The Trade Desk, in April 2022, Green attracted note in the press for a $834 million pay package, much of which was in stock options. In 2023, Forbes estimated his wealth at $6 billion. In early 2024, The Trade Group purchased Sincera. The Trade Desk by that time was the largest independent adtech firm. In November 2024, Green announced that The Trade Desk was building a connected television operating system, to be called Ventura. He noted that unlike competitors operating similar TV ad platforms, such as Google and Roku, The Trade Desk didn't operate a supply-side platform (SSP), which he argued simplified the business model and removed a potential conflict of interest.

== Boards and affiliations ==
From 2011 to 2012, Green was on the Networks and Exchanges Quality Assurance Guidelines Committee for the Interactive Advertising Bureau (IAB). He has also been on the boards of European global advertising technology companies Falk Technologies and IncreaseOnline, and has been an advisor to AppNexus and SiteWit. Green and The Trade Desk support NPOs Water.org, The Charity Defense Council, Thorn, and Not Impossible.

== Speaking and appearances ==
As CEO of The Trade Desk, Green has appeared on Bloomberg TV, Business Insider, CNBC, Fox Business, NPR and The Wall Street Journal. In 2017, he appeared on 60 Minutes to discuss how consumers can avoid fake news and, in 2019, Green launched an instructional video series on digital advertising concepts. In 2025, he spoke at the Interactive Advertising Bureau's Annual Leadership Meeting. He was a Global Conference Speaker at the Milken Institute in 2025.

Green has advocated the concept of an open internet, a fragmented market outside of major companies such as Google, Facebook, and Amazon. He stated in 2020 that Trade Desk was trying to "string together a healthy ecosystem in the open internet, so that all the disparate pieces . . . can compete with [the big tech groups]." He has been an outspoken critic of Google's dominance in the online advertising market, and has argued that Google exiting the open internet could be the remedy for its antitrust ruling in 2025.

== Awards and recognition ==
In 2015, Green was among the American Marketing Association 4 Under 40 Emerging Leaders. Also, Forbes named The Trade Desk to its top 10 of America's Most Promising Companies in 2015, and Green and Pickles were also both named Ernst & Young Entrepreneur of the Year Award recipients in the Greater Los Angeles region, for which Green had been a finalist in 2014. He has an honorary Doctor of Humane Letters from California State University Channel Islands.

== Personal life ==
Green lives in Newbury Park, California, in Thousand Oaks, northwest of Los Angeles. He is divorced and has two sons and a daughter. He served a mission for the Church of Jesus Christ of Latter-day Saints in the California Ventura Mission, but is now disassociated, having publicly criticized the church in 2021 for hindering equality and global progress, resigning his membership in 2021, and donating $600,000 to an LGBTQ rights organization, Equality Utah.

=== Philanthropy ===
Described as an "aggressive philanthropist" by the Wall Street Journal, he joined The Giving Pledge in November 2021, promising to donate 90 percent of his wealth during his lifetime. He founded the Jeff T. Green Family Foundation in June 2020, which has donated to a number of educational programs. With the motto "Dismantling Disparity Through Data," in 2019 and 2020, the foundation made donations to California State University Channel Islands (CSUCI) to support mentorship programs, and in 2021 it funded CSUCI's The Jeff T. Green Family Foundation Scholarship program. In 2023 his foundation donated an additional $5.2 million to CSUCI for scholarships.

He is founder of the nonprofit DataPhilanthropy, his family foundation's giving arm. DataPhilanthropy has funded the Ruth Cheatham Foundation to provide scholarships to young people with cancer. In 2023, Green was involved in creating the Scholarship Data Dashboard database at California State University, Northridge (CSUN).

== See also ==
- List of Internet entrepreneurs
- List of Brigham Young University alumni
