= Ludicorp =

Software company in Canada

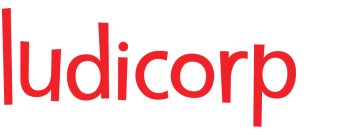
- Company type: Private
- Industry: Software development
- Founded: 2002; 24 years ago
- Founder: Stewart Butterfield, Caterina Fake and Jason Classon
- Headquarters: Vancouver, British Columbia, Canada

Ludicorp was a company based in Vancouver, British Columbia, Canada, that created Flickr and Game Neverending. It was founded in 2002 by Stewart Butterfield, Caterina Fake and Jason Classon and was bought by Yahoo! on March 20, 2005.

== History ==
=== Background ===
Stewart Butterfield, a founder of Ludicorp, earned a bachelor's degree in philosophy in 1996 from the University of Victoria and then went on to earn master's degrees in philosophy and in history from the University of Cambridge. Butterfield says his choice in degree, although uncommon for a STEM CEO, has benefited him in management and running businesses. He then became a part of Jason Classon's start up business Gradfinder.com, which they would end up selling.

Caterina Fake and Stewart Butterfield met as web designers living in San Francisco and Vancouver respectively when they met. Fake moved to Vancouver and the two got married, starting Ludicorp with Classon, just after their honeymoon. Fake says that the inspiration for the name Ludicorp came from the Latin word ludus, meaning play, as they were working on an online game, Game Neverending.

=== Development of Game Neverending ===
Shortly following Ludicorp's founding, Butterfield, Classon and Fake began working on Game Neverending. According to Fake “[She] did the game design, Stewart did the interaction design and Jason did the PHP for the prototype.” During the time they were developing Game Neverending, Ludicorp were able to secure a government loan and began to break even shortly later. Fake expressed how raising funds for Flickr however was difficult as it was a new concept, including many new features in the new social media market.

According to Fake, “Neopets was one of the inspirations for Game Neverending,” a game where online multiplayer interaction was available. It was meant to be a game that would not end, and there was no concept of winning or losing in it. Game Neverending was finished and released in 2002. Game Neverending eventually became Ludicorp's major project, Flickr.

=== Development of Flickr ===
Game Neverending contained a feature which would allow players to communicate and share photographs with each other. However, all the technical features used to create this function were also the fundamental features of Flickr. After Game Neverending became a financial failure, the Ludicorp executives decided to drop that project and pursue Flickr, as it was beginning to gain financial success in 2004.

Flickr's first version was built in 8 weeks using the technology and software from Game Neverending. It was a social networking site, allowing users to post and share pictures they had taken, without any help from professional companies. Its fast growth was pushed by the increasing popularity of social networking sites, such as YouTube, and the increasing availability of smartphones with built in cameras.

Although many users were professional photographers, Flickr was aimed at those who found photography as a hobby. Ludicorp created Flickr in a way that it filled a hole in the market; other competitors did not allow bloggers to post pictures. Ludicorp also added many first ever features in Flickr, such as “authing in,” being able to change the amount of information you share with your friends and activity streams.

Ludicorp also designed Flickr to be more focused on content, rather than as a social interaction site, unlike a platform such as Facebook. Users can follow other users in a non-mutual subscription model, like YouTube. Furthermore, content can be viewed without the subscription, another first for social media sites in 2004. At that time, publicly viewable content was not a feature on other social media platforms.

By the end of 2004 Flickr was worth approximately US$25 million. This led to Yahoo! becoming interested in acquiring Ludicorp.

=== Acquisition by Yahoo! ===
At the end of 2004, Butterfield, Fake and Classon sold Ludicorp to Yahoo!. Following the acquisition, Fake and Classon left, with Butterfield following two years later in 2007 after having his second child and divorcing from Fake. In a memoir he sent to Brad Garlinghouse, announcing his resignation he said he felt “sidelined” by Yahoo! and did not have as much of a say in his company anymore.

In the years that Yahoo! owned Ludicorp, its main product Flickr peaked and then began to decline, with other social media networks taking over, such as Instagram and Snapchat. Yahoo! did not focus on the development of Flickr and it became unprofitable for Ludicorp and Yahoo!. Yahoo! sold Flickr to SmugMug, causing Ludicorp to lose its main product.
