= Eric Paley =

American venture capitalist and entrepreneur

- Education: Dartmouth College, Harvard University
- Occupations: Economic development executive; entrepreneur; venture investor
- Years active: 1999–present
- Title: Massachusetts Secretary of the Executive Office of Economic Development
- Spouse: Shirley Paley
- Children: 2
- Website: foundercollective.com

Eric Paley is Massachusetts Secretary of the Executive Office of Economic Development. He was partner emeritus of Founder Collective, a venture capital firm based in Cambridge, and the co-founder and former CEO of Brontes Technologies, a dental technology company acquired by 3M in 2006.

== Early life and education ==
Paley grew up on Long Island. He attended Dartmouth College, graduating magna cum laude with a BA in political science in 1998. He received an MBA from Harvard Business School with distinction in 2003 as a Baker Scholar.

== Career ==
=== Monitor Group, Abstract Edge ===
Following his graduation from Dartmouth, Paley returned to New York, where he began his career as a strategy consultant for The Monitor Group. In 1999, with his brother and a cousin, he founded Abstract Edge Web Solutions, a web development company. Their clients included the Million Mom March, a rally in support of stricter gun control that took place on the National Mall on Mother's Day 2000. Abstract Edge developed the website, millionmommarch.com, which raised more than $100,000 for the organization.

=== Brontes Technologies ===
Paley attended Harvard Business School after leaving Abstract Edge in 2001. His classmates included Micah Rosenbloom and David Frankel. As MBA students, Rosenbloom and Paley partnered with MIT professor Douglas Hart to co-found and run Brontes Technologies, a 3D digital dental impression and fabrication system based on technology from MIT and the research of János Rohály and two MIT graduate students. Paley served as the CEO of Brontes until 2006. Rosenbloom was its COO and Frankel its first investor. All three graduated from Harvard Business School in 2003.

Paley holds six patents related to the invention and commercialization of the Brontes system.In 2006, the company was acquired by 3M for $95 million.

=== Founder Collective ===
Following the sale of Brontes, Paley began investing in technology startups with Rosenbloom and Frankel. In 2008, with several part-time partners, they founded Founder Collective, a seed-stage venture capital fund with the mission of “being the most aligned fund for founders at the seed stage." Over the course of his career at Founder Collective he led investments in companies including Uber (NYSE:UBER); The Trade Desk (NASDAQ:TTD); Airtable, Formlabs, WHOOP and Cruise.

=== Massachusetts Secretary of the Executive Office of Economic Development ===
Paley has actively lobbied for the elimination of non-compete agreements, fighting against patent trolls, and funding for student technology internships in Massachusetts.On June 24, 2025, it was announced that he had been appointed Secretary of the Executive Office of Economic Development for Massachusetts by governor Maura Healey. His term began in September 2025.

== Recognition ==
He has appeared on the Forbes Midas List five times. He was #9 in 2020, making him the highest ranked seed investor on the list. He was named in the Business Insider list of Top US Seed Investors in 2021, 2022, 2023 and 2024, and the Boston Globe Tech Power Players 50 in 2022, 2023, 2024, and 2025. He also appeared on Boston magazine's list of the most influential people in Massachusetss. He was an Entrepreneur-In-Residence at the Harvard Business School from 2011 until 2015.

== Personal life ==
Paley and his wife, Shirley Paley, an attorney, live in Lexington, Massachusetts. They met in 1998 as students at Dartmouth College. They have two children.
