= Caterina Fake =

American entrepreneur and businesswoman (born 1969)

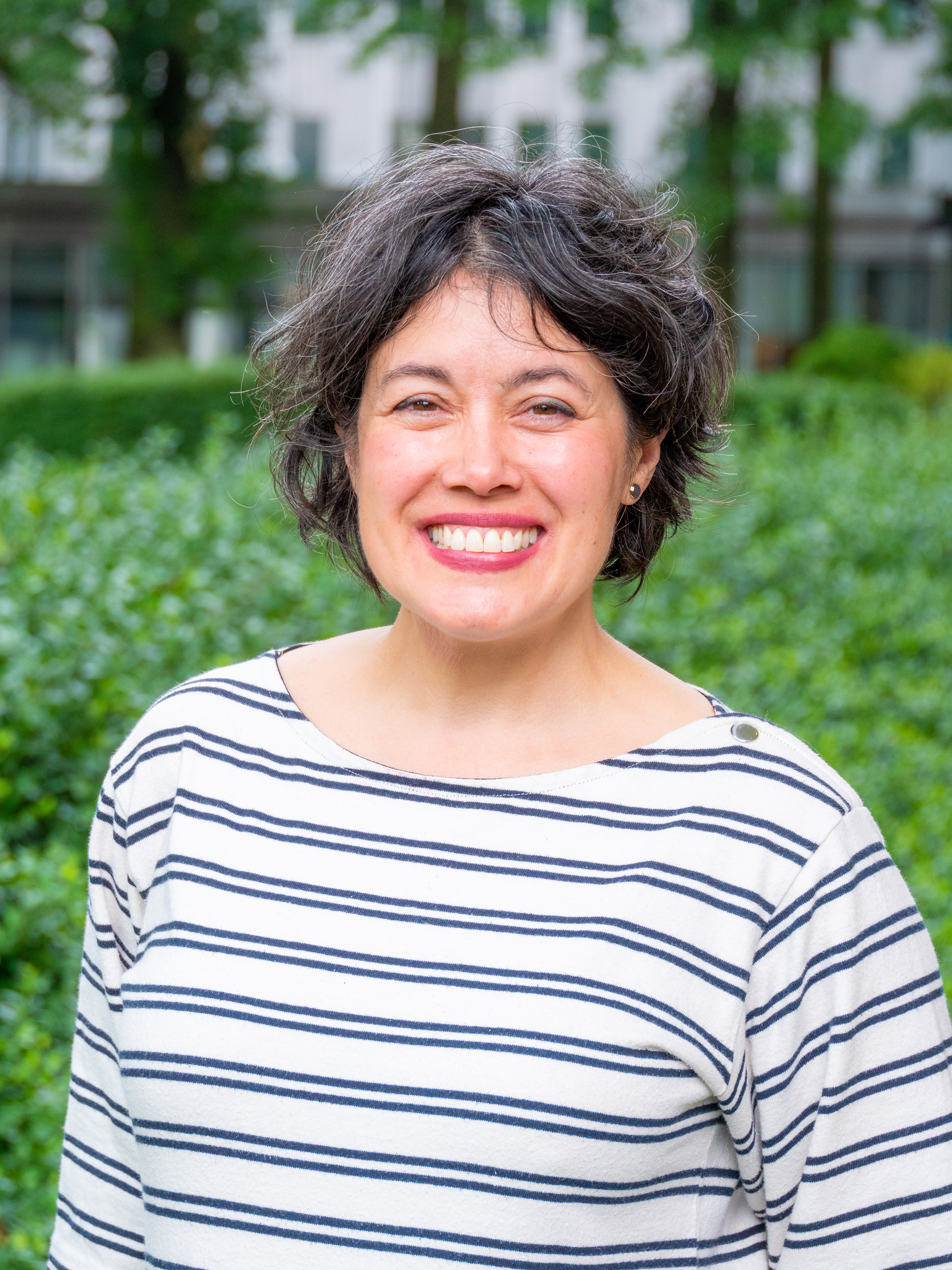
- Fake in 2019
- Born: June 13, 1969 (age 57); Pittsburgh, Pennsylvania
- Education: Vassar College (1991)
- Occupations: Entrepreneur, businesswoman
- Known for: Co-founding Flickr and Hunch
- Spouse(s): Stewart Butterfield (2001–2007); Jyri Engeström (2015–2023)
- Children: 1

Caterina Fake (born June 13, 1969) is an American entrepreneur, investor, artist, and widely considered one of the earliest architects of the modern social web. She co-founded the websites Flickr in 2004 and Hunch in 2007. Fake is a trustee for nonprofit organizations and served as the chairwoman of Etsy. For her role in creating Flickr, Fake was listed in Time magazine's Time 100 in 2006, and she has been recognized within Silicon Valley as a titan for her work as an angel investor.

== Early life and education ==
Fake (Note: Her surname is from Middle English Fawke, from Old French Fauque, in turn from Latin Falco, "falcon", either a medieval nickname or metonymic for a falconer.) was raised in northern New Jersey by her American father and her Filipina mother. As a child, she was not allowed to watch television, and her hobbies included reading poetry and playing classical music.

She graduated from Choate Rosemary Hall in 1986 and Vassar College in 1991 with a degree in English, after transferring from Smith College in 1989. Vassar had an intranet that the students could connect to from their dorm rooms, which Fake credits as being largely responsible for her eventually finding web design. After working various jobs, including as a painter's assistant, an investment banker, and at a dive shop (which Fake called her "post-college what-do-I-want-to-do period"), she was delayed in San Francisco while visiting her sister. Fake taught herself about the Internet, learning to program from scratch and creating websites and CD-ROMs.

== Career ==
In 1997, she took a job managing the community forums of Netscape. This experience, along with others in blogging and online communities, led her to co-found Ludicorp in Vancouver with Stewart Butterfield and Jason Classon in summer 2002. The company developed a massively multiplayer online role-playing game called Game Neverending. The game did not launch, but Fake and Butterfield started a new product called Flickr in 2004 that became one of the world's most popular photosharing websites. Flickr was acquired by Yahoo! in 2005 for around US$30 million. It became part of the "Web 2.0" sites, integrating features such as social networking, community open APIs, tagging, and algorithms that surfaced the most popular content. After the acquisition, Fake joined Yahoo, where she ran the Technology Development group, known for its Hack Yahoo program, Yahoo Pipes and Brickhouse, a rapid development environment for new products. She left Yahoo in June 2008.

Fake previously worked as the art director for Salon, a news and opinion website started in 1995. In 2007, she co-founded the website Hunch with entrepreneur Chris Dixon, which was acquired by eBay for $80 million in November 2011. Hunch was widely recognized for its early development of predictive technology, creating a "taste graph" to analyze users' preferences and predict future choices. In 2014, Fake's launched Findery under limited beta under the name Pinwheel. It was renamed to Findery in July 2012. The company is headquartered in San Francisco.

Fake joined the board of directors of Creative Commons in August 2008, and the Sundance Institute board of trustees in 2015. She served as board member and chairman of Etsy from 2006 to 2014. Known for investing in early-stage companies, Fake is widely recognized for making crucial early investments in companies like Etsy, Cloudera, Blue Bottle Coffee, Kickstarter, Hipcamp, Lovevery and dozens of other startups. Fake was also a Founder Partner at Founder Collective during some of the firm’s earliest investments, including BuzzFeed and Uber.

Fake has won many awards, including Bloomberg Businessweek's "Best Leaders" in 2005, Forbes's 2005 eGang, Fast Company's Fast 50, and Red Herring's 20 Entrepreneurs under 35. She was listed on the 2006 Time 100—Time magazine's list of the world's 100 most influential people—under the category "Builders and Titans". She received a lifetime achievement award in 2009 from Rhizome at The New Museum and honorary doctorates from the Rhode Island School of Design in 2009 and from The New School in 2013. Fake was a recipient of the 2018 "Visionary Award" from the Silicon Valley Forum, which recognizes leaders in Silicon Valley businesses. She has spoken at major conferences around the world, including the Vanity Fair Founder's Forum and Davos' World Economic Forum. Among her most recognized businesses, she was identified for her contributions to Silicon Valley as an author and angel investor, and was inducted into the Angel Investor Hall of Fame in 2023.

Fake hosted the podcast "Should This Exist?" produced by Quartz, which invites creators of new technology to evaluate the human side of their inventions and analyze its impact on the world. The podcast was downloaded over 4 million times, and reached #1 on Apple Podcasts.

In recent years, Fake's work has expanded beyond technology and venture capital into art, literature, philosophy, and the inner life. Through her writing, public speaking, and creative practice, she has explored questions of imagination, meaning, dreams, spirituality, and the psychological consequences of life online. In interviews, Fake has advocated for a more thoughtful, creative, and human-centered internet.

In 2025, Fake created a Bed for Dreaming, an immersive installation that invites participants into a contemplative space devoted to dreams, memory, and imagination. First presented at the Jones Institute and later exhibited at Minnesota Street Project in San Francisco, the work combines sculpture, ritual objects, mythology, darkness, music, and recorded dreams to create what Fake describes as a refuge from the anxiety and fragmentation of contemporary life. The project draws on traditions of dream interpretation, liminal experience, and collective storytelling.

Fake is also the creator and host of the podcast Ingenious, a series of conversations with artists, thinkers, journalists, technologists, and cultural leaders exploring creativity, resilience, and the future of society. Through the podcast she has conducted interviews with figures including Nobel Peace Prize laureate Maria Ressa, conductor Esa-Pekka Salonen, director Peter Sellars, writer Dave Eggers, comedian W. Kamau Bell, and numerous entrepreneurs, activists, and innovators. Through a separate venue, Fake also spoke with author Malcolm Gladwell and filmmaker Werner Herzog at the Sydney Goldstein Theater at the City Arts and Lectures.

In 2026, Fake was named one of Forbes' top 250 Greatest Living Innovators. She was labeled by Business Insider one of the best women's early stage investors and received recognition from Beta Boom as one of the top female angel investors in America, according to data. In the same year, Fake was also named to the Founders Forum Angels Hall of Fame for her long history of early stage investments.

== Personal life ==
Fake was married to Stewart Butterfield, her Flickr co-founder, from 2001 to 2007. They had one daughter together in 2007.
