= Vostu =

Social games developer

- Company type: Private
- Industry: Mobile Games; Social Games
- Founded: May 2007
- Founder: Daniel Kafie; Mario Schlosser; Joshua Kushner
- Number of locations: Buenos Aires, Argentina
- Key people: Daniel Kafie, CEO; Fernando Piccolo, CTO; Angel Mazzarello, CPO; Florentino Arce, CFO
- Website: www.vostu.com

Vostu was the largest social games developer in Brazil and Latin America in the early 2010s. The company was started in 2007 by Daniel Kafie, Mario Schlosser, and Joshua Kushner.

The main games developed by Vostu were Topfarm, Café Mania, MegaCity, Mini Fazenda, GolMania, Candy Dash, Riddle Pic, Shaking Vegas, Magic Valley, among others. These social games are available on Orkut, Facebook and Google +. Today, more than 100 million users are registered in Vostu applications: one in every four Brazilians play one or more of their products.

In 2011, the company was considered by Forbes Magazine as one of the top 10 startups in Brazil and Business Insider included it in the list of 100 world's most valuable startups. The company's current value is unknown and the company keeps secret about that value. However, TechCrunch had estimated at one time that its market value could reach $300 million. In 2011, the company announced the purchase of MP Game Studio, a company dedicated to casual & multiplayer games, expanding its portfolio of games. Later that same year, the company was sued by Zynga, alleging copyright infringement. An agreement between the companies closed the case.

In early 2012, Vostu conducted a restructuring of the company's departments, unifying developments of the games in the Buenos Aires, Argentina office and business operations in Brazil. In mid-2012, the company shows the results of this restructuring with the launch of new social, casual and mobile games.

By mid-2013, however, the company had laid off as much as two thirds of its personnel, with Schlosser and Kafie resigning their positions, and "internal management and political issues with the engineering and product teams" rendering the company "organizationally unable to add features or service games in a way that would keep players engaged".

== Games ==
=== Mobile ===
- Topfarm
- Candy Dash
- Elemental
- RiddlePic
- Shaking Vegas

=== Social ===
- Mini Fazenda
- GolMania
- Candy Dash
- Find & Climb
- RiddlePic
- Café Mania
- Magic Valley
- MegaCity
- Shaking Vegas

=== Discontinued ===
- World Mysteries
- Word Show
- Milhão na Mesa
- Flying Kingdoms
- Joga Craque
- Mega Poker / Vostu Poker
- Pet Mania
- Rede do Crime

== Partnerships and platforms ==
Many brands and celebrities have signed partnership with Vostu Games.

=== Platforms ===
- Google Play
- iOS Market
- Facebook
- Orkut

=== Partnerships ===
- Fortumo
- GetJar
- Flurry

=== Brands ===
- Guaraná Antarctica

In May 2011, a new machine reached Café Mania in which players could serve different flavors of Guaraná Antarctica for Ronaldo and Claudia Leitte. To prepare the drinks, players had to collect guaranás from guaraná plants outside of restaurants.

- AdeS

In September 2011 arrived some AdeS recipes at Café Mania. Players could serve dishes and coffees prepared with the company's products. In addition to new recipes in the game, Vostu also created a contest in which players had to take a picture of one of the AdeS’ recipes done in real life, competing for game credits.

- Del Valle Juices

This was an action of its cross-media campaign on TV, where Del Valle Juices tells why their juices were so tasty. At the Mini Fazenda, users received from their friends "Watering Cans of Affection" to care for their crops and winning the "Tender Touch", which sped up their crops and made them yield more. The promotion was launched in September 2011.

- Netflix

In that same month, Vostu has partnered with Netflix to offer their players a lot of credit to sign up for the service of the company. Café Mania was one of the games that had provided this offer available only to Orkut players. This promotion reappeared many times in the game with other offers of credit.

- Pepsi, Visa and Vivo

Pepsi, Visa and Vivo went as partners in the Vostu GolMania launch in September 2011 and had their brands exposed in the middle of the soccer fields and on the boards of sponsorship, as well as in real soccer matches.

- River Plate and Boca Juniors

Broadening participation in GolMania in December 2011 two of the most important teams in America arrived at the game with the construction of stadiums and the possibility to play with their uniforms.

- Corinthians

In November 2011, Corinthians came in Mega City with exclusive items of Timão for fans include in their cities. Furthermore, it was possible to build a replica of Corinthians future stadium, apply for tickets for the 2012 Paulistão games and shirts autographed by players from the team.

- Vasco da Gama

First Brazilian club to participate in GolMania, the Club de Regatas Vasco da Gama launched its stadium in April 2012. With the partnership, users can also play from the club's official fanpage on Facebook.

- Ketchupp Hellmann's

In May 2012, Ketchup Hellmann's arrived in Mini Fazenda. The players had to receive special tomato seeds from their friends, plant them, and when harvesting Hellman's tomatoes, the players had to process them in the machine to receive special items such as profitable ketchups, potion to speed crops, tomatoes guardians of crops etc.

- Decolar.com

The partnership between Vostu and Decolar.com was presented in June 2012. The action was based on performance tasks that intended to broaden the interaction between the players of Mega City and the brand that appears on aircraft and on the airports of the "MegaCidades". The strategy of the game leads users to like Decolar.com Fan Page on Facebook and also to fulfill goals such as takeoff and landing aircraft, collect profits from hotels and exchange postcards.

- Walmart

In July 2012, Walmart launched a virtual store in MegaCity that allows users to make purchases via e-commerce. By accessing the platform, the player receives an invitation to make their purchases at the site of Walmart and can earn up to 100 "MegaGranas" at the Roulette of Fortune. The player can also do his shopping at the Walmart store through the game and earn 5% discount.

=== Celebrities ===
- Adriana Lima

In May 2011, top model Adriana Lima has recorded a TV commercial to promote the launch of MegaCity.

- Ivete Sangalo

In June 2011, came into MegaCity several special items of the Brazilian singer Ivete Sangalo. It was added in the game typical buildings of Bahia, Ivete special missions where players earned awards to keep them, one hit dedicated to the singer, the possibility of visiting the island of the singer in the game and an Arena that players could improve it and profit more in the game. Besides, in the game also arrived a Trio Elétrico, where players had the chance to know the singer personally. To do this, players had to gather fans and replace them with coupons to compete. Moreover, the novelties in the game, Ivete Sangalo also recorded a TV commercial showing the game, replacing Adriana Lima.

- Michel Teló

In April 2012, another Brazilian artist arrived in MegaCity, this time it was Michel Teló. Among the novelties in the game related to the singer, there was special constructions, the singer's goals, an Arena and an exclusive remix dedicated to him. Besides, the players also had the chance to win CDs and DVDs from Michel Teló. For that players had to meet all the goals from Michel and then answer a question on item Michel Party.
