= Angelgate =

2010 angel investing controversy

Angelgate is a controversy surrounding allegations of price fixing and collusion among a group of ten angel investors in the San Francisco Bay Area.

== Emergence ==
=== The issue ===
The scandal began in September 2010 after Michael Arrington, editor of the TechCrunch publication, wrote in his blog that he had been turned away from a secret meeting among so-called "super angels" he knew, held at Bin38, a wine bar in San Francisco's Marina District. The participants at the meeting, among other things, discussed how they could compete with other angels, venture capitalists, and the Y Combinator business incubator for the limited pool of worthy investment opportunities. Arrington said that after the meeting, he had been informed by two of the attendees that the investors had discussed how to fix low valuations for new start-up companies, and how to keep better-funded venture capitalists from investing.

The blog became the subject of discussion among the Silicon Valley start-up community over the next several days. Investor Ron Conway, whose business partner attended the meeting, wrote an email highly critical of the angels involved and called the event "despicable and embarrassing". Dave McClure, a well-known angel present at the event, wrote in a blog that Arrington's account was inaccurate, and a tweet (later deleted) complaining about Conway. Chris Sacca wrote a lengthy email that defended the participants and was critical of Conway, which was also leaked to TechCrunch.

== Aftermath and critique ==
Reports arose that the United States Federal Bureau of Investigation began reviewing the incident.

There was skepticism that there was actually any collusion or that price fixing could succeed if it was attempted. The event also gave rise to various online cultural phenomena. Among other things there was a flash mob at the wine bar, a Hitler Downfall parody, a spike in the establishment's Google rank, a number of Twitter jokes, and so-called "fakeplans" for super-angel meetups on the site plancast.com. On Monday, September 27, 2010, Ron Conway, Dave McClure, Chris Sacca, and others appeared at a panel discussion hosted by Arrington at his "TechCrunch Disrupt" conference in San Francisco where, despite Arrington's prodding, they avoided a "Jerry Springer moment".
