= Comfort Dental =

American chain of dental clinics

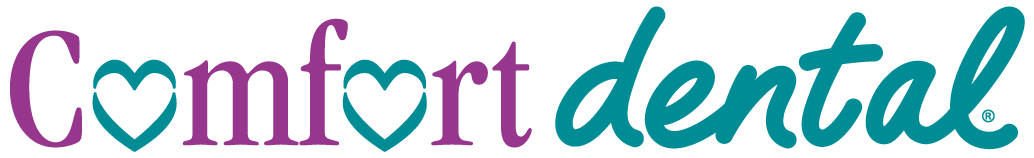
- Industry: Dentistry
- Founded: 1977; 48 years ago
- Founder: Dr. Rick Kushner, D.D.S.
- Headquarters: Lakewood, Colorado, United States
- Area served: United States
- Products: Dentistry
- Website: comfortdental.com

Comfort Dental is a dental franchise with over 150 independently owned offices in 10 states across the United States. Comfort Dental was founded in 1977 by Dr. Rick Kushner, D.D.S. It is based in Lakewood, Colorado.

In 2021, the company launched Comfort Dental Shares, a new community initiative helping kids, veterans and families.

In 1984, beginning in Colorado, Comfort Dental franchisees offered free dental care on Christmas Day, called Care Day. "[A]pproximately 300 Comfort Dental dentists and 1,300 staff members donate their time on Care Day.

Comfort Dental sponsors a mascot race at Denver's Coors Field called the "Tooth Trot".
