= NextCard =

American credit card company

NextCard, Inc. was a United States company that was one of the first issuers of credit cards online, and the first to offer instant online approval. Its headquarters were located in San Francisco, California and maintained offices in Livermore, California and at 4129 E Van Buren St, Phoenix, Arizona. The issuing bank was known as NextBank and was fully owned by NextCard, Inc.

NextCard, Inc. was started during the Internet boom of the late 1990s. Jeremy and Molly Lent, a married couple, founded the company in 1996 as Internet Access Financial Corporation, later changing the name to NextCard in 1997. During the early 1990s, Jeremy Lent had served as CFO for Providian Financial Corporation which had relied heavily on direct mail marketing methods "to identify and recruit customers who made extensive use of credit cards". Convinced that he could adapt this marketing strategy for the Internet, Lent left Providian to form NextCard.

== Operations ==
The Lents' business plan was based on two assumptions:

1. Since a key metric in the credit card industry is acquisition cost of a new customer, he felt that he could "use the internet to undercut the average acquisition cost" of its "brick-and-mortar" competitors and
2. He believed his company would have "significantly lower bad debt losses than conventional credit card issuers since marketing research had found that internet users were generally more affluent and, thus, better credit risks, than individuals drawn from the general population of consumers".

Because of these assumptions, NextCard, Inc. offered credit cards at interest rates lower than its competitors'.

NextCard issued MasterCard and Visa cards under its own brand, and co-branded cards with MyPoints.com, PlanetOut.com, and Amazon.com. NextCard also issued secured credit cards. NextCard was a major online advertiser at the time, as they only accepted applications online. Its website was "regularly named one of the top 50 financial websites by Money magazine and by 2000 attracted more online 'hits' than any other website in the financial services industry".

The company set aggressive growth targets and went public in 1999. Following its initial public offering, the internet 'bubble' in the stock market had burst. This "effectively shut off the access of NextCard and thousands of other struggling Internet companies to the debt and equity markets". Jeremy Lent's assumptions also proved to have flaws; the acquisition cost per-customer was higher than expected because Internet users tended to ignore NextCard's online ads (which were also very costly), and the customers were people with little creditworthiness looking for a "lender of last resort".

== Downfall ==
To understate its credit losses NextCard refused to "provide sufficient allowances each period for expected bad debts" . The Comptroller of the Currency (OCC) reviewed the company's accounting records and operating policies and procedures and forced NextCard to "significantly increase its allowance for bad debts". In response to this, NextCard stated that its high bad debts were due to fraudulent schemes perpetrated by hackers and the like.

On October 31, 2001, it was announced that NextCard was under-capitalized and was then investigated by the Federal Deposit Insurance Corporation (FDIC) and the Office of the Comptroller of the Currency. The reason, as stated to employees, was that the company had been categorizing as "fraud losses" what should have been categorized as "credit losses"... meaning the company was trying to categorize as fraud some of the money lost due to issuing cards to people with very poor credit. The Amazon.com Visa issued by NextCard was subsequently issued by Chase following NextCard's demise.

NextCard investors soon filed a class-action lawsuit with charges that the management had engaged in insider trading and hidden the financial status of the company. To add to the controversy, NextCard's external auditors, Ernst & Young, edited past-audit's work-papers and electronic timestamps in order to rid themselves of any liability for giving NextCard a clean audit opinion in the previous year.

One of the auditors, Oliver Flanagan, saved a computer disk containing evidence of the edits and turned it in to the federal authorities. The lead auditor of NextCard from Ernst & Young, Thomas Trauger, would be sentenced to one year in prison and two years of "supervised release."

NextCard's stock price fell from its high of $53.12 to $.14 per share, and in February 2002 the company was taken over by the FDIC. The bank tried to find a buyer and was under negotiations with CompuCredit for a while, but in the end no buyer was found. In early July 2002, most NextCard credit card accounts were closed.

A small portfolio of credit cards that were issued to those with low credit scores was sold to Merrick Bank of Utah, who then increased the annual percentage rates (APRs) and fees. In 2003, NextCard was liquidated with liabilities of nearly $470 million and realizable assets of approximately $20 million. Fraud charges and insider trading charges were filed against five former NextCard executives.

In 2005, the U.S. Securities and Exchange Commission dismissed its fraud charges against Jeremy Lent and by 2006 the regulatory and shareholder suits against the former NextCard executives were settled.
