= Flickr =

Image and video hosting website

- A viewing page for a photograph hosted on Flickr in 2018
- Website type: Image and video hosting service
- Available in: Chinese (traditional); English; French; German; Indonesian; Italian; Korean; Portuguese; Spanish; Vietnamese
- Founded: Vancouver, British Columbia, Canada (2004; 22 years ago)
- Headquarters: San Francisco, California, United States
- Creators: Stewart Butterfield; Caterina Fake
- Parent: Ludicorp (2004–2005); Yahoo! Inc. (2005–2017); Oath (2017–2018); SmugMug (2018–present)
- Website: flickr.com
- IPv6 support: Yes
- Commercial: Yes
- Registration: Required
- Users: 112 million
- Launched: February 10, 2004; 22 years ago

Flickr (/ˈflɪkər/ FLIK-ər) is an image and video hosting service, as well as an online community, founded in Canada and headquartered in the United States. It was created by Ludicorp in 2004 and was for a time a common way for amateur and professional photographers to host high-resolution photos. Flickr was owned by Yahoo! from 2005 and has been owned by SmugMug since 2018.

As of June 10, 2015, Flickr had a total of 112 million registered members and more than 3.5 million new images uploaded daily. On August 5, 2011, the site reported that it was hosting more than 6 billion images. In 2024, it was reported as having shared 10 billion photos and accepting 25 million per day. Flickr also hosts the largest collection of Creative Commons-licensed photos on the web.

Photos and videos can be accessed from Flickr without the need to register an account, but an account must be made to upload content to the site. Registering an account also allows users to create a profile page containing photos and videos that the user has uploaded and also grants the ability to add another Flickr user as a contact. For mobile users, Flickr has official mobile apps for iOS, Android, and an optimized mobile site.

== History ==
Flickr was launched on February 10, 2004, by Ludicorp, a Vancouver-based company founded by Stewart Butterfield and Caterina Fake. The service emerged from tools originally created for Ludicorp's Game Neverending, a web-based massively multiplayer online game. Flickr proved a more feasible project, and ultimately Game Neverending was shelved. Butterfield later launched a similar online game, Glitch, which was shut down on November 14, 2012.

Early versions of Flickr focused on a chat room called FlickrLive, with real-time photo exchange capabilities. The successive evolutions focused more on the uploading and filing back-end for individual users and the chat room was buried in the site map. It was eventually dropped as Flickr's back-end systems evolved away from Game Neverending's codebase. Key features of Flickr not initially present are tags, marking photos as favorites, group photo pools and interestingness, for which a patent was granted.

In addition to being a popular website for users to share and embed personal photographs and an online community, in 2004, the service was widely used by photo researchers and by bloggers to host images that they embed in blogs and social media.

Yahoo! acquired Ludicorp and Flickr on March 20, 2005. The acquisition reportedly cost between $22 million and $25 million. During the week of June 26, 2005 to July 2, 2005, all content was migrated from servers in Canada to servers in the United States, and all resulting data became subject to United States federal law. On May 3, 2007, Yahoo! announced that Yahoo! Photos would close down on September 20, 2007, after which all photos would be deleted; users were encouraged to migrate to Flickr. On January 31, 2007, Flickr announced that, to continue using the service, "Old Skool" members (those who had joined before the Yahoo! acquisition) would be required to associate their account with a Yahoo! identity by March 15, 2007. This move was criticized by some users.

Flickr upgraded its services from "beta" to "gamma" status on May 16, 2006, the changes attracted positive attention from Lifehacker. On December 13, 2006, upload limits on free accounts were increased to 100 MB a month (from 20 MB) and were removed from Flickr Pro accounts, which originally had a 2 GB per month limit. On April 9, 2008, Flickr began allowing paid subscribers to upload videos, limited to 90 seconds in length and 150 MB in size. On March 2, 2009, Flickr added the facility to upload and view HD videos, and began allowing free users to upload normal-resolution video. At the same time, the set limit for free accounts was lifted. In 2009, Flickr announced a partnership with Getty Images in which selected users could submit photographs for stock photography usage and receive payment. On June 16, 2010, this was changed so that users could label images as suitable for stock use themselves.

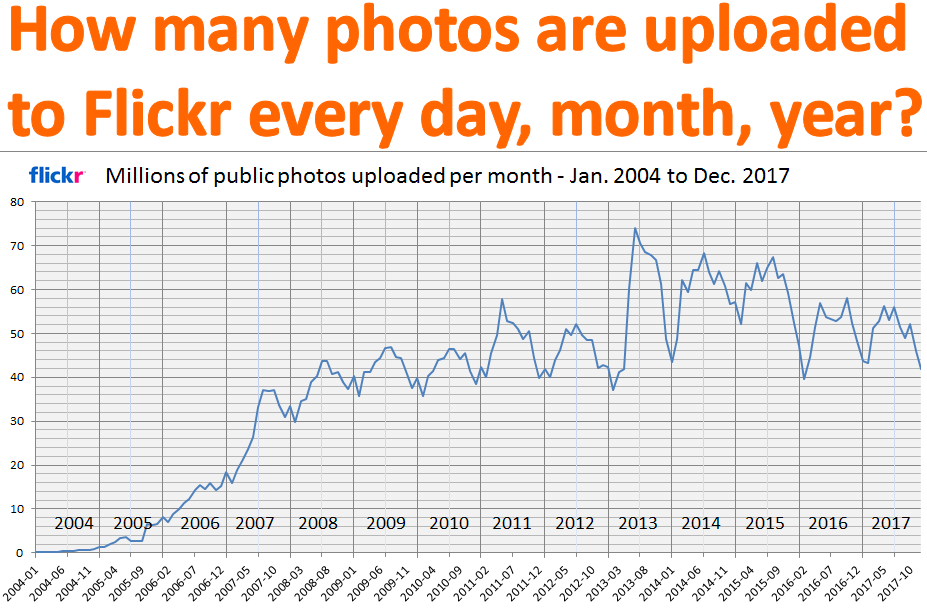
Graph of Flickr public uploads, which peaked in 2013–2015 before the launch of Google Photos

On May 20, 2013, Flickr launched the first stage of a major site redesign, introducing a "Justified View" close-spaced photo layout browsed via "infinite scrolling" and adding new features, including one terabyte of free storage for all users, a scrolling home page (mainly of contacts photos and comments) and updated Android app. The Justified View is paginated between 72 and 360 photos per page but unpaginated in search result presentation. Tech Radar described the new style Flickr as representing a "sea change" in its purpose. Many users criticized the changes, and the site's help forum received thousands of negative comments. On March 25, 2014, Flickr's New Photo Experience, a user interface redesign, left beta.

On May 7, 2015, Yahoo! overhauled the site, adding a revamped Camera Roll, a new way to upload photos, and upgraded the site's apps. The new Uploadr application was made available for Macs, Windows and mobile devices.

In 2018, Yahoo! (owned by Verizon at that point) sold Flickr to SmugMug.

In early May 2019, SmugMug announced the migration of Flickr data, involving 100+ million accounts and billions of photos and videos, from the servers of former owner Yahoo! to Amazon Web Services (AWS), in a planned 12-hour transition to occur on May 22, 2019.

SmugMug launched the non-profit Flickr Foundation in December 2022 with the goal of preserving free photos on Flickr for 100 years in the public domain.

In May 2023, Flickr announced the development of the Print Shop feature that was being tested with a list of approved sellers. The Print shop feature allows photographers to sell prints via a storefront, and allows purchases from consumers. The feature was to allow only approved members access to it, but the criteria for that were yet to be announced.

=== Corporate changes ===
On June 13, 2008, Flickr co-founder Stewart Butterfield announced his resignation on July 12, 2008, which followed that of his wife and co-founder Caterina Fake, who left the company on the same day. Butterfield wrote a humorous resignation letter to Brad Garlinghouse.

On December 14, 2008, The Guardian reported that three employees had been laid off as Yahoo! continued to reduce its workforce and, on November 30, 2010, CNET reported Yahoo! was on the verge of a major layoff, affecting 10% to 20% of its workforce. Flickr was specifically named as a target for these layoffs.

On June 13, 2017, Verizon Communications acquired Yahoo!, including Flickr. Verizon reorganized Yahoo!, along with AOL, into a new umbrella company, Oath, which was renamed as Verizon Media on January 8, 2019.

On April 20, 2018, SmugMug acquired Flickr from Verizon's Oath and put an end to Flickr 1 TB storage plan for free users. Those users had until February 5, 2019, to convert to "Pro" accounts or their photo streams would be reduced to a maximum of 1,000 pictures. The deadline was later extended to March 12, 2019. The reasons cited were that the existing model was unsustainable by a medium-sized company which could not get revenues by selling profiles of the users. The sentiment was generally agreed on among the professionals. This policy, however, was never implemented and was abandoned in March, 2022 in favor of a policy that restricted content unless the user upgraded and paid for a Pro account.

== Features ==
=== Accounts ===
Flickr has always offered two types of accounts: free and paid. Until January 7, 2019, free accounts had up to 1 TB of storage. On January 8, 2019, the account offerings changed. The free option is limited to 1,000 photos or videos stored, with videos limited to three minutes. After January 8, 2019, members over the limit could no longer upload new photos to Flickr. On February 5, 2019, a free account's older content would be deleted automatically if it contains more than 1,000 photos and they do not subscribe to the paid service tier, with the exception of content that was already uploaded with a Creative Commons copyright license before November 1, 2018.

The paid option features "unlimited" storage, advanced statistics, advertising-free browsing, videos up to 10 minutes in length, "premier" customer service, and promotional offers with other partners.

In May 2011, Flickr added an option to easily reverse an account termination, motivated by the accidental deletion of a Flickr user's account, and public reporting of its protracted restoration. Flickr may delete accounts without giving any reason or warning to the account's owner.

As a result of the SmugMug buyout, Flickr added the ability for users to download all of their account data, such as photo albums, contacts, and comments.

On April 15, 2025, Flickr announced to restrict downloads of original and large-size images (larger than 1024 px) owned by free accounts since May 15, Creative Commons-licensed photos and Flickr Commons members will not be affected.

=== Organization ===
The images a photographer uploads to Flickr go into their sequential "photostream", the basis of a Flickr account. All photostreams can be displayed as a justified view, a slide show, a "detail" view or a date stamped archive. Clicking on a photostream image opens it in the interactive "photopage" alongside data, comments and facilities for embedding images on external sites.

Users may label their uploaded images with titles and descriptions, and images may be tagged, either by the uploader or by other users, if the uploader permits it. These text components enable computer searching of Flickr. Flickr was an early website to implement tag clouds, which were used until 2013, providing access to images tagged with the most popular keywords. Tagging was further revised in the photopage redesign of March 2014. Flickr has been cited as a prime example of effective use of folksonomy.

Users can organize their Flickr photos into "albums" (formerly "sets") which are more flexible than the traditional folder-based method of organizing files, as one photo can belong to one album, many albums, or none at all. Flickr provides code to embed albums into blogs, websites and forums. Flickr albums represent a form of categorical metadata rather than a physical hierarchy. Geotagging can be applied to photos in albums, and any albums with geotagging can be related to a map using imapflickr. The resulting map can be embedded in a website. Flickr albums may be organized into "collections", which can themselves be further organized into higher-order collections.

Organizr is a Web application for organizing photos within a Flickr account that can be accessed through the Flickr interface. It allows users to modify tags, descriptions and set groupings, and to place photos on a world map (a feature provided in conjunction with Yahoo! Maps). It uses Ajax to emulate the look, feel and quick functionality of desktop-based photo-management applications, such as Google's Picasa and F-Spot. Users can select and apply changes to multiple photos at a time, as an alternative to the standard Flickr interface for editing.

=== Access control ===
Flickr provides both private and public image storage. A user uploading an image can set privacy controls that determine who can view the image. A photo can be flagged as either public or private. Private images are visible by default only to the uploader, but they can also be marked as viewable by friends or family. Privacy settings also can be decided by adding photographs from a user's photostream to a "group pool". If a group is private all the members of that group can see the photo. If a group is public the photo becomes public as well. Flickr also provides a "contact list" which can be used to control image access for a specific set of users in a way similar to that of LiveJournal. In November 2006, Flickr created a "guest pass" system that allows private photos to be shared with non-Flickr members. This setting allows sets or all photos under a certain privacy category (friends or family) to be shared. Many members allow their photos to be viewed by anyone, forming a large collaborative database of categorized photos. By default, other members can leave comments about any image they have permission to view and, in many cases, can add to the list of tags associated with an image.

=== Interaction and compatibility ===
The core functionality of the site relies on standard HTML and HTTP features, allowing for wide compatibility among platforms and browsers; Flickr's functionality includes RSS and Atom feeds and an API that enables independent programmers to expand its services. This includes a large number of third-party Greasemonkey scripts that enhance and extend the functionality of Flickr. In 2006, Flickr was the second most extended site on userscripts.org. Organizr and most of Flickr's other text-editing and tagging interfaces use Ajax, with which most modern browsers are compliant. Images can be posted to the user's photostream via email attachments, which enables direct uploads from many smartphones and applications. Flickr uses the Geo microformat on over three million geotagged images.

According to the company, as of August 2009 Flickr is hosted on 62 databases across 124 servers, with about 800,000 user accounts per pair of servers. Based on information compiled by highscalability.com, as of November 2007 the MySQL databases are hosted on servers that are Linux-based (from Red Hat), with a software platform that includes Apache, PHP (with PEAR and Smarty), shards, Memcached, Squid, Perl, ImageMagick and Java; the system administration tools include Ganglia, SystemImager, Subcon, and CVSup.

Signed-in Flickr users can "Follow" the Photostreams of other Flickr photographers. Reciprocating this process is optional. A user's homepage contains a stream of their Contacts' photos at 2/3 screen size.

Groups are another major means of interaction with fellow members of Flickr around common photography interests. A Flickr Group can be started by any Flickr user, who becomes its administrator and can appoint moderators. Groups may either be open access or invitation-only, and most have an associated pool of photos. The administrator of the Flickr group can monitor and set restrictions for the group, assign awards to members, and may curate and organize the photo content. Recent uploads to a group will sometimes appear on its members' homepages. Group photo pools may be displayed in the "Justified View" or as a slideshow.

"Galleries" of photos from other photostreams may be curated by any signed-up Flickr user, provided the feature is not disabled by the photo's uploader, these are then publicly viewable.

Any Flickr user can post comments to a Flickr photo on its photopage, unless this has been disabled by the uploader, and users can "favorite" a photo. A user's favorites can be viewed in a justified or slideshow display.

Users of Windows Photo Gallery, Apple's iPhoto (version 8), Adobe's Lightroom 3.2, Apple's Aperture (version 3.0), darktable, and digiKam have the ability to upload their photos directly to Flickr. They can also automatically update their status on other social networking services when they upload their images to Flickr. Flickr provides a desktop client for Mac OS X and Windows that allows users to upload photos without using the web interface. Uploadr allows drag-and-drop batch uploading of photos, the setting of tags and descriptions for each batch, and the editing of privacy settings.

Flickr has entered into partnerships with many third parties:

- Flickr had a partnership with the Picnik online photo-editing application that included a reduced-feature version of Picnik built into Flickr as a default photo editor. On April 5, 2012, Flickr replaced Picnik with Aviary as its default photo editor.
- In addition to commercial mapping data, Flickr now uses OpenStreetMap mapping for various cities; this began with Beijing during the run-up to the 2008 Olympic games. As of October 2008, this is used for Baghdad, Beijing, Kabul, Sydney and Tokyo. OpenStreetMap data is collected by volunteers and is available under the Open Database License.
- Flickr offers printing of various forms of merchandise, including business cards, photo books, stationery, personalized credit cards and large-size prints from companies such as Moo, Blurb, Tiny Prints, Capital One, Imagekind, and QOOP.
- The Flickr partnership with Getty Images to sell stock photos from users is under review as of early 2014.

=== Filtering ===
In March 2007, Flickr added new content filtering controls that let members specify by default what types of images they generally upload (photo, art/illustration, or screenshot), how "safe" (i.e., unlikely to offend) their images are, and specify that information for specific images individually. Individual images are assigned to one of three categories: "safe", "moderate" and "restricted". Users can specify the same criteria when searching for images. The system separates family-friendly photos and adult content; generic image searches normally produce no pornographic results, with the visibility of adult content restricted to users and dedicated Flickr communities who have opted into viewing it.

Flickr has used this filtering system to change the level of accessibility to "unsafe" content for entire nations, including South Korea, Hong Kong and Germany. In summer 2007, German users staged a "revolt" over being assigned the user rights of a minor.

=== Licensing ===
Breakdown of Creative Commons license use on Flickr as of 2009

Flickr offers users the ability to either release their images under certain common usage licenses or label them as "all rights reserved". The licensing options primarily include the Creative Commons 2.0 attribution-based and minor content-control licenses – although jurisdiction and version-specific licenses cannot be selected. As with "tags", the site allows easy searching of only those images that fall under a specific license.

On January 16, 2008, Flickr launched a program called "The Commons on Flickr." Several international cultural institutions share images using a "no known copyright restrictions" through the program. According to Flickr, the goal of the program is to "firstly show you hidden treasures in the world's public photography archives, and secondly to show how your input and knowledge can help make these collections even richer." Participants include the National Museum of Denmark, Powerhouse Museum, George Eastman Museum, Library of Congress, Nationaal Archief, National Archives and Records Administration, National Library of Scotland, State Library of New South Wales, and Smithsonian Institution.

In May 2009, White House official photographer Pete Souza began using Flickr as a conduit for releasing White House photos. The photos were initially posted with a Creative Commons Attribution license requiring that the original photographers be credited. Flickr later created a new license which identified them as "United States Government Work", which does not carry any copyright restrictions.

In March 2015, Flickr added the Creative Commons Public Domain Mark and Creative Commons Zero (CC0) to its licensing options. The Public Domain Mark is meant for images that are no longer protected by copyright. CC0 is used for works that are still protected by copyright or neighbouring rights, but where the rightsholders choose to waive all those rights.

== Reception ==
Flickr became an immediate success and was seen as a successful example of "Web 2.0", and a year later was purchased by Yahoo!. Initially, the site was most popular with professional photographers and graphic designers as well as bloggers who used it as an image repository. In 2007, Flickr was the 19th most popular website on the Internet according to its Alexa Rank. However, since then, its popularity has declined relative to social media platforms with photo sharing capabilities (such as Facebook and Instagram), as well as cloud file storage services (such as Dropbox). By 2021, Flickr's Alexa Rank had declined significantly, yet indicated that the website was still among the top 500 most popular websites globally.

== Controversies ==
=== Censorship ===
On June 12, 2007, in the wake of the rollout of localized language versions of the site, Flickr implemented a user-side rating system for filtering out potentially controversial photos. Simultaneously, users with accounts registered with Yahoo! subsidiaries in Germany, Singapore, Hong Kong, and Korea were prevented from viewing photos rated "moderate" or "restricted" on the three-part scale used. Many Flickr users, particularly in Germany, protested against the new restrictions, claiming unwanted censorship from Flickr and Yahoo.

Flickr management, unwilling to go into legal details, implied that the reason for the stringent filtering was the existence of some particularly strict age-verification laws in Germany. The issue received attention in the German national media, especially in online publications. Initial reports indicated that Flickr's action was a sensible, if unattractive, precaution against prosecution, although later coverage implied that Flickr's action may have been unnecessarily strict. On June 20, 2007, Flickr reacted by granting German users access to "moderate" (but not "restricted") images, and hinted at a future solution for Germany, involving advanced age-verification procedures.

Since June 1, 2009, Flickr has been blocked in China in advance of the 20th anniversary of the Tiananmen Square protests of 1989.

=== Copyright enforcement ===
Michael Arrington of TechCrunch and the Electronic Frontier Foundation have criticised Flickr for its heavy-handed implementation of the Digital Millennium Copyright Act (DMCA) and Online Copyright Infringement Liability Limitation Act (OCILLA). Under OCILLA, a service provider such as Flickr is obliged to delete or disable access to content as soon as they receive an official notice of infringement, to maintain protection from liability. After having one of his own pictures taken down following an incorrect DMCA claim, British comedian Dave Gorman researched the issue and concluded that if the Flickr user was not based in the United States or they were, but the person filing the notice of infringement was not, Flickr deleted the disputed content immediately. Even if the user could successfully demonstrate that the content did not infringe upon any copyright, Flickr did not, according to Gorman, replace the deleted content. He argued that this was contrary to its obligations in responding to a counter-notice. Shortly afterward, Flickr changed its policy.

In 2019, Flickr added new theft detection tool options to certain users. Some subscribers will be provided "copy-protection tools that can detect if their images have been used without permission," the BBC reported in 2019, noting "Flickr Pro subscribers will be able to monitor up to 1,000 images and send automated copyright claims to people or companies that use their photos."

=== Sale of Creative Commons-licensed photos ===
In November 2014, Flickr announced that it would sell wall-sized prints of photos from the service that are licensed under Creative Commons licenses allowing commercial use. Although its use of the photos in this manner is legal and allowed under the licenses, Flickr was criticized by users for what they perceived to be unfair exploitation of artists' works, as all the profits from these offerings go to Yahoo! and are not shared with their respective photographers, and users were not given a means of opting-out from the program without placing their photos under a more restrictive non-commercial license. By contrast, a similar opt-in program for "licensed" photos does give photographers a 51% share of sales. On December 19, 2014, Flickr General Manager Bernardo Hernandez announced they would pull all Creative Commons-licensed images from the program and issue refunds, stating that "Subsequently, we'll work closely with Creative Commons to come back with programs that align better with our community values."

=== Deletion of files of non-paying users ===
On November 1, 2018, Flickr announced new restrictions for its users.

- On January 8, 2019, non-paying users would only able to upload up to 1000 files free of charge.
- Deletion of the oldest files, determined by the upload date, was scheduled to begin on March 12, 2019, until the limit of 1000 files was met. The size of the individual files would not be relevant. Alternatively, users could upgrade to Pro subscription for US$60 per year.

On March 17, 2022, Flickr revealed that it had not in fact deleted any photos for exceeding storage limits. However, it announced that it would soon implement a policy limiting the sharing of "moderate" or "restricted" content to Pro users, and limiting free users to 50 "non-public" images. Images beyond these limits would be at risk for deletion.

== See also ==
- Image hosting service
- Image sharing
- List of online image archives
- List of image-sharing websites
- List of social networking websites
- User-generated content
- Tumblr
- Wikimedia Commons
