= Joshua Kushner =

American businessman (born 1985)

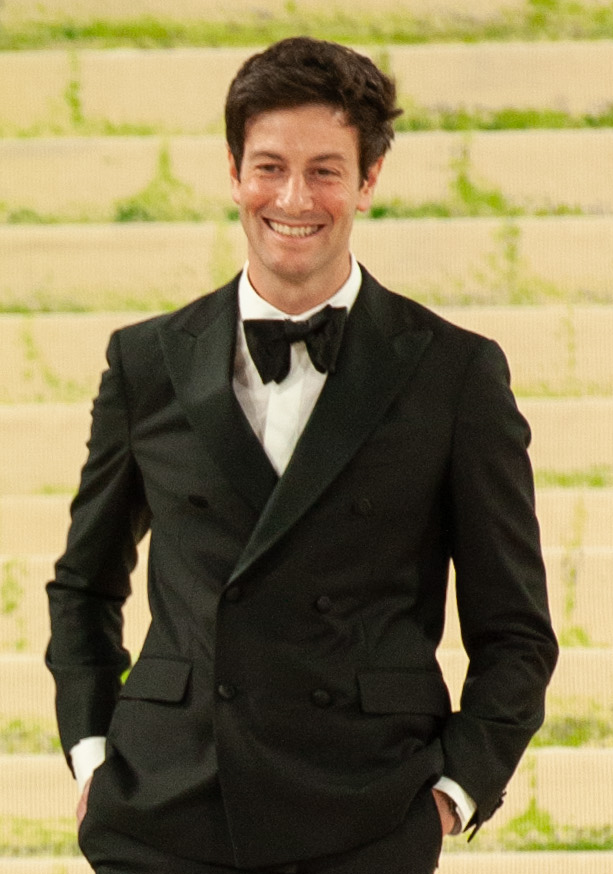
- Kushner in 2026
- Born: June 12, 1985 (age 41); Livingston, New Jersey, U.S.
- Education: Harvard University (BA, MBA)
- Occupations: Businessman; investor
- Title: Founder, owner, and managing partner of Thrive Capital; Co-founder and vice-chairman of Oscar Health; Co-founder of Vostu
- Spouse: Karlie Kloss (m. 2018)
- Children: 3
- Father: Charles Kushner
- Family: Kushner

Joshua Kushner (born June 12, 1985) is an American businessman and venture capitalist. He is a founder and managing partner of the venture capital firm Thrive Capital, co-founder and vice-chairman of Oscar Health, and the co owner of the Los Angeles Lakers. He is the youngest son of Charles Kushner, and the brother of Jared Kushner.

Kushner also co-founded social games developer Vostu. In August 2026, Kushner bought the Los Angeles Lakers along with Bob Iger for a record $12.5 billion. Kushner has been described as a lifelong Democrat. As of August 2026, Forbes estimates Kushner's net worth to be $16.7 billion. As of October 2026, per Bloomberg his net worth is $17.5B.

== Early life and education ==
Joshua Kushner was born on June 12, 1985, in Livingston, New Jersey, where he grew up in a Jewish family to parents Charles and Seryl Kushner. Kushner graduated from Harvard College in 2008, and from Harvard Business School in 2011.

== Career ==
=== Early career ===
During his second year at Harvard, Kushner was founding executive editor of Scene, a pop culture student publication. The publication was badly received by critics upon release.

In spring of his junior year, he worked with two graduate students to pool $10,000 to found social network Vostu, which aimed to "fill a void left by online communities in which English is the lingua franca", like Facebook. According to Kushner, Latin America was a promising market for a Facebook-alternative and new social networking site because "[it was] a place where Internet use is increasing every year, and technology is booming at a rapid pace". Vostu laid off the majority of its employees in 2013 and significantly scaled back operations after a copyright lawsuit from a competitor accused it of copying games.

The year after graduation, he cofounded a start-up called Unithrive. Unithrive was inspired by the peer-to-peer loan model of Kiva, but aimed to "ease the crisis in paying for college" by matching "alumni lenders to cash-strapped students ... who [could] post photographs and biographical information and request up to $2,000", interest-free for repayment within five years of graduation. He started his career in the private equity arm of Goldman Sachs, working for a year on distressed debt.

=== Thrive Capital ===
Kushner founded Thrive Capital in 2009, a venture capital firm that focuses on media and internet investments. Since its founding, Thrive has raised over $7.3 billion from institutional investors, including Princeton University. Thrive's capital funds include: Thrive II, which raised $40 million in 2011; Thrive III, which raised $150 million in 2012; Thrive IV, which raised $400 million in September 2014; Thrive V, raising $700 million in 2016; Thrive VI, raising $1 billion in 2018; Thrive VII, raising $2 billion in 2021; Thrive VIII, raising $3 billion in 2022; and Thrive IX, raising $5 billion in 2024.

Kushner was the second-largest investor in Instagram's Series B funding round. Valued at $500 million, Thrive soon doubled its money after Instagram was sold to Facebook.

In 2021, Bloomberg reported Goldman Sachs invested in Kushner's Thrive Capital at a $3.6 billion valuation. Kushner sold a 3.3% stake in Thrive to a group of investors, including Disney's Bob Iger and Kohlberg Kravis Roberts' Henry Kravis, valuing Thrive at $5.3 billion.

As of November 2025, Forbes estimates his net worth to be $5.2 billion, primarily from his ownership in Thrive. Fortune magazine listed Kushner in its inaugural list of the 100 Most Powerful People in Business in 2024, citing Thrive's early investment in OpenAI.

=== Oscar Health ===
Kushner is a co-founder and vice-chairman of Oscar Health, a health insurance start-up. Founded in 2012, Oscar was valued at $2.7 billion in 2016. Oscar went public in 2021, with Kushner's Thrive Capital owning a stake worth $1.21 billion. Oscar reported an $87 million loss in its first quarter as a publicly traded company.

In 2020, it was revealed by The Atlantic that Jared Kushner had contracted Oscar Health to develop a coronavirus testing website that was later scrapped, though Trump had said publicly that Google was developing the website.

=== Cadre ===
In 2015, Kushner founded a new company called Cadre with his brother Jared and their friend Ryan Williams, with Williams as Cadre's CEO. Cadre is a technology platform designed to help certain types of clients, such as family offices and endowments, invest in real estate.

=== JK2 ===
Kushner and his brother, Jared, each own 50% of JK2 (also known as Westminster Management), a real estate management company.

In April 2021, a Judge ruled that JK2 was found to have committed "widespread and numerous" violations of Maryland's consumer protection laws at Baltimore-area properties by collecting debts without the required licenses, charging tenants improper fees, and misrepresenting the condition of rental units. During the COVID-19 pandemic, JK2 filed a significant number of lawsuits against tenants for debt collection and eviction, despite an eviction moratorium being in place.

Kushner's JK2 was also featured in an episode of Netflix's Dirty Money series titled "Slumlord Millionaire". The episode was based on an expose from ProPublica accusing the company of abusing tenants' rights, leaving homes in disrepair, humiliating late-paying renters, and suing tenants when they try to move out.

=== Other activities ===
Kushner became a minority owner of the Memphis Grizzlies after acquiring a 2.5% stake in 2019. In 2024, he purchased a small stake in the Miami Heat and consequently sold his stake in the Memphis Grizzlies.

In 2024, Kushner and his wife Karlie Kloss's media company, Bedford Media, announced plans to revive Life magazine in an agreement with Dotdash Meredith, with the first print issue scheduled for early 2025. He joined the board of directors of A24 Films that year.

=== Purchase of Los Angeles Lakers ===
On August 12, 2026, it was reported that Kushner purchased the NBA team, the Los Angeles Lakers, along with Bob Iger for $12.5 billion. The transaction was later finalized in October 2026. The businessmen were involved in expansion in Las Vegas, but pivoted to buy the Lakers from Mark Walter. The deal is the highest ever purchase price for a professional sports team, breaking the previous high of $10 billion set when Walter purchased the team in 2025.

In a statement, Kushner and Iger stated, "As lifelong NBA fans, we are deeply honored for the opportunity to become stewards of the Los Angeles Lakers, one of the most iconic sports franchises in the world. We have immense respect for the leadership and vision of Jerry and Jeanie Buss. Our long-term commitment is to build on that foundation, compete at the highest level, and serve this extraordinary team, its fans, and the city of Los Angeles." This quote celebrates Kushner and Iger's Immense commitment to the franchise.

== Personal life ==
Kushner married the supermodel Karlie Kloss in 2018. They have two sons, born in March 2021 and July 2023, and a daughter, born in September 2025.

In December 2020, the couple purchased a home in Miami Beach, Florida, for US$23.5 million. They also bought a 7,200-square-foot (670 m^{2}) penthouse in the Puck Building in Manhattan for $35 million in 2021, and paid $29.5 million for the Wave House in Malibu, California, in August 2024.

== See also ==
- Kushner family
