= Ron Conway =

American investor (born 1951)

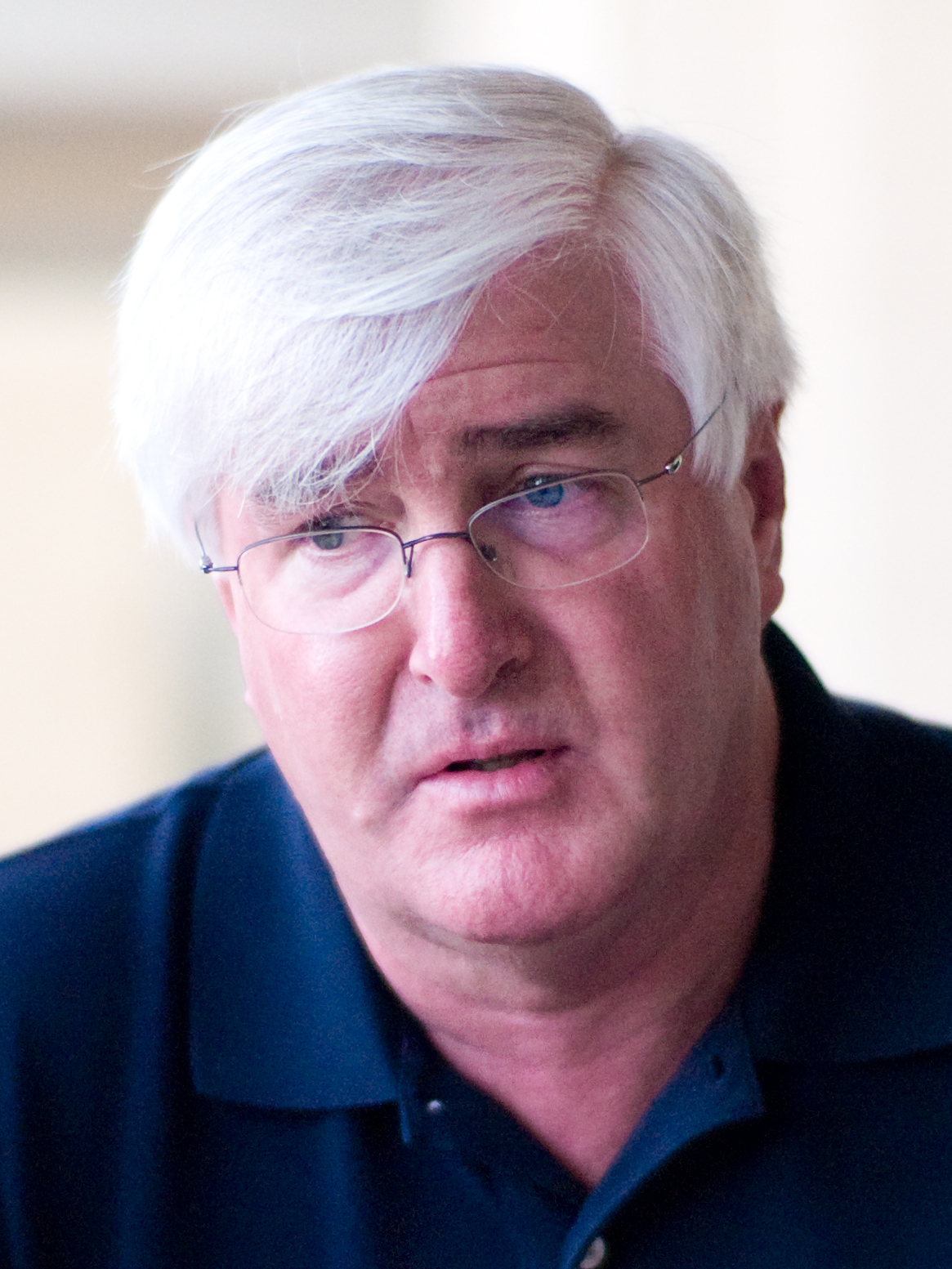
- Conway in 2007
- Born: Ronald Crawford Conway; March 9, 1951 (age 75); San Francisco, California, U.S.
- Education: San Jose State University (BA)
- Title: Co-founder of SV Angel
- Spouse: Gayle Conway

Ronald Crawford Conway (born March 9, 1951) is an American venture capitalist, super angel and philanthropist. He is co-founder of SV Angel, a venture capital fund.

== Early career ==
Conway grew up in San Francisco. Conway graduated from San Jose State University with a bachelor's degree in political science. He grew up in an Irish Catholic family.

Conway worked with National Semiconductor Corporation in marketing positions from 1973 to 1979, and at Altos Computer Systems as president and CEO from 1988 to 1990. He was the CEO of Personal Training Systems (PTS) from 1991 to 1995. PTS was later acquired by SmartForce/SkillSoft.

== Investing ==
Conway began angel investing in the mid-1990s, with investments in Marimba Systems, Red Herring magazine, and others. He raised $4 million for his first venture capital fund, called Adam Ventures, in 1997. In December 1998, he started a venture capital firm called Angel Investors LP. Within two months he had raised $30 million for its first fund, Angel Investors I. At the end of 1999, Angel Investors closed on its second fund, Angel Investors II, raising $150 million. Angel Investors LP was an early investor in Google, Ask Jeeves, Loudcloud, Napster, and PayPal. The 2006 Forbes "Midas list of top dealmakers" recognized Conway for his success with Angel Investors LP.

Conway was a special partner at Baseline Ventures from 2006 through 2009. In 2009 Conway turned his personal investment vehicle, SV Angel, into a venture capital firm, raising $10 million from outside investors. In September 2010, Conway criticized a private meeting of investors at the center of Angelgate, a scandal of alleged collusion.

SV Angel raised six funds through 2018. In 2018, Conway announced that SV Angel would retool its investing strategy for a time, returning to a "back to basics" role as individual angels instead of raising a new fund. In March 2022, Conway announced that SV Angel had raised $269 million for its first-ever growth equity fund. The new fund is led by Ashvin Bachireddy, who previously co-founded Geodesic Capital. SV Angel also promoted Beth Turner to lead its seed fund, with Ron & Topher Conway overseeing both funds as Managing Co-directors.

=== List of investments ===
Among Conway's 650 or more investments are:

- Airbnb
- Attributor
- Blippy
- Digg
- Facebook
- Google
- OMGPOP
- Reddit
- OZY

== Philanthropy ==
=== Civic and public health ===
Conway is active in community and philanthropic activities related to medicine and public health, serving as Vice Chairman of UCSF Medical Foundation in San Francisco and also as co-chair of the "Fight for Mike" Homer and Creutzfeldt–Jakob disease. He is on the development committees of UCLA, St. Francis High School, Sacred Heart Schools, UCSF Medical Center in San Francisco, Lucile Packard Children's Hospital, Legacy Ventures, and Ronald McDonald House at Stanford. He serves on the Benefit Committee of the Tiger Woods Foundation. He is a founding donor of Arc Institute.

=== Political views ===
In 2021 Conway joined The Giving Pledge, a campaign established by Bill Gates and Warren Buffett to persuade and recruit extremely wealthy people to contribute a majority of their wealth to philanthropic causes.

In 2022 Conway donated $2.5 million to Mila Kunis and Ashton Kutchers' 'Stand with Ukraine' GoFundMe as well as $25,000 to Ariana Grande's Protect & Defend Trans Youth Fund.

==== Gun violence ====
Conway is on the advisory board of Sandy Hook Promise, a nonprofit organization founded by the parents of the victims of the Sandy Hook Elementary School shooting.

Conway donated $1 million to fund the Firearms Challenge of the Smart Tech Challenges Foundation, a nonprofit organization he founded with the mission to promote firearms safety through technology and innovation.

== Political activities ==
Conway was the single largest campaign contributor to Ed Lee in his successful campaign for Mayor of San Francisco in November 2011; Conway raised $600,000 for Lee through independent expenditure committees. Since then questions have been raised about whether Lee has taken actions to benefit companies in which Conway has investments.

In 2012, Conway founded the San Francisco Citizens Initiative for Technology and Innovation, or sf.citi, a 501(c) organization that advocates for the technology community and is involved in a number of public initiatives, and private/public partnerships involving tech companies partnering with public agencies such as the San Francisco Health Department, the Office of Emergency Management, the police department, and the school district.

In April 2013, a lobbying group called FWD.us (aimed at lobbying for immigration reform and improvements to education) was launched, with Ron Conway listed as one of the supporters.

In 2014, Conway, along with fellow Airbnb investor Reid Hoffman, donated a total of $685,000 to David Chiu in support of Chiu's tightly fought Assembly campaign against current San Francisco supervisor and 2015 Prop F supporter David Campos.

Conway has been highly critical of President Donald Trump, especially on the issues of gun control and immigration. He was reported to have spent more than $1 million and raised millions more to support efforts to win Democratic control of the U.S. House of Representatives in 2018. Recode named him one of ten major Silicon Valley donors and fundraisers for the 2018 November midterm elections

Conway was also an early supporter of Mayor London Breed, though in 2018 his focus remained on national issues over local San Francisco elections. However, his wife, Gayle, donated $200,500 to a political action committee that attacked Breed's opponent Jane Kim.

Conway served as co-chair of the COVID-19 Technology Task Force, an technology industry coalition founded in March 2020 collaborating to respond to and recover from the COVID-19 pandemic.

In August 2022, Conway contributed $50,000 to The Next 50, a liberal political action committee (PAC).

In the first quarter of 2024, Conway and his sons contributed half of the cash contributions provided to the political committee Oakland United to Recall Sheng Thao, or "OUST."

In 2024, Conway donated $250,000 to Clear Choice, a liberal political action committee (PAC), who aims to prevent third-party from undermining Democratic candidates. Conway donated $500,000 to pro-cryptocurrency super PAC Fairshake in 2024, but later left the group after its support for Bernie Moreno.

In 2025, Conway resigned from the Salesforce Foundation board after Salesforce CEO Marc Benioff urged Donald Trump to deploy the National Guard to San Francisco amid Trump's deployment of federal forces to other cities.

== Personal life ==
Conway currently resides in San Francisco. He has a wife and three children.

In April 2026, Conway was diagnosed with a 'rare' cancer.
