= Chris Dixon =

American tech entrepreneur, investor (born 1971/72)

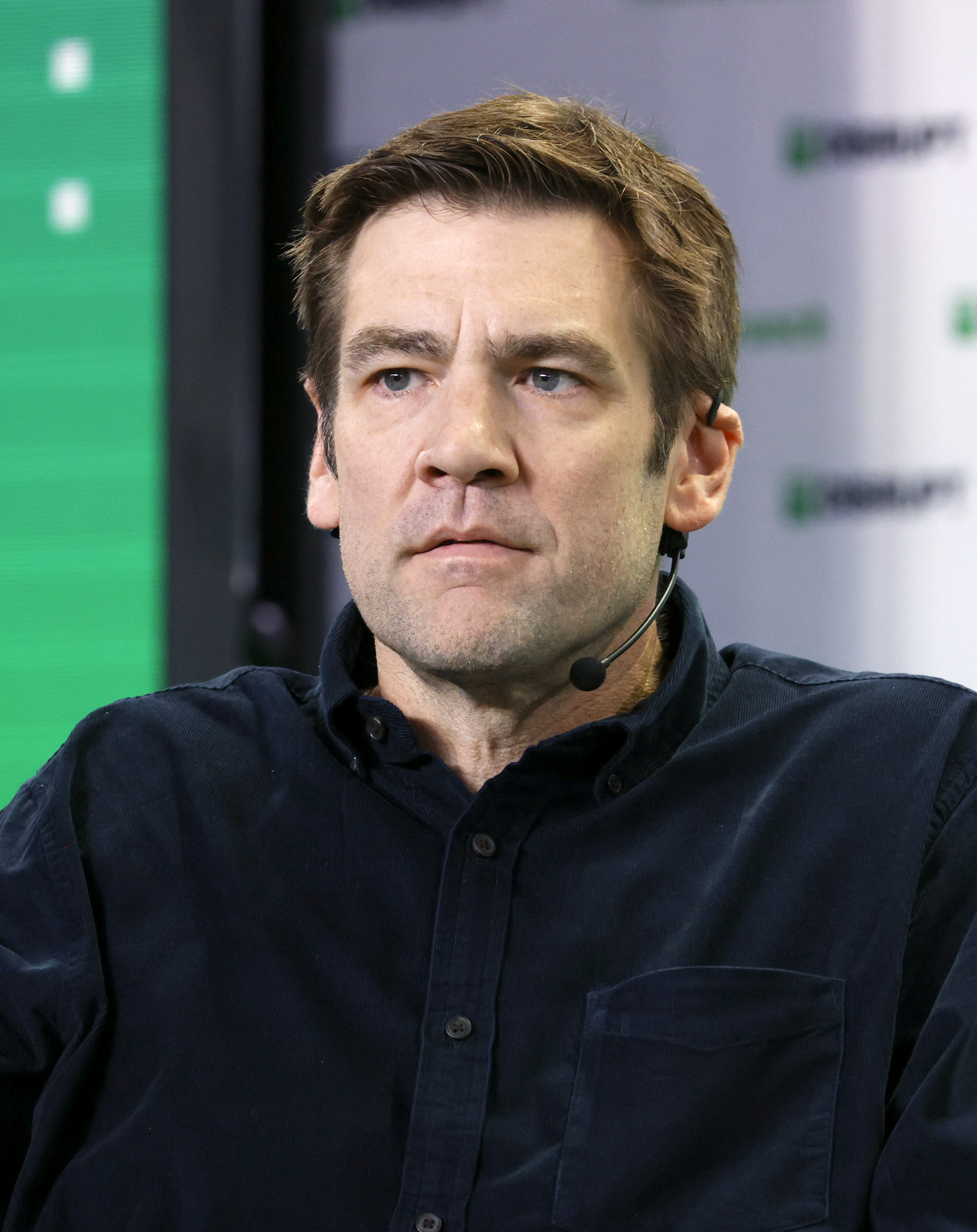
- Dixon in 2022
- Born: 1971 or 1972 (age 54–55)
- Education: Columbia University (BA); Harvard University (MBA)
- Title: General Partner, Andreessen Horowitz

Chris Dixon (born 1971/1972) is an American internet entrepreneur and investor. He is a general partner at the venture capital firm Andreessen Horowitz. He is also the co-founder and former CEO of Hunch. Dixon is known as a cryptocurrency and Web3 evangelist.

== Early life and education ==
Dixon grew up in Ohio. He earned a BA and an MA from Columbia University, majoring in philosophy, and has an MBA from Harvard Business School. His early college days were at Wesleyan University before he transferred.

== Career ==
=== Business ===
Dixon joined the venture capital firm Bessemer Venture Partners.

In 2005, Dixon co-founded SiteAdvisor, a web-security startup that was bought by security company McAfee in 2006. In 2009, he founded Hunch with Caterina Fake and Tom Pinckney, which was acquired by eBay in 2011.

=== Andreessen Horowitz ===
As of 2022, Dixon is a general partner at Andreessen Horowitz, a venture capital firm in Menlo Park, California. After joining the firm in 2012, Dixon led a variety of investments for the firm including FiftyThree, Soylent, and Nootrobox. He sits on the board of 3D printing startup Shapeways.

Dixon became an early advocate for investments in Bitcoin, which he championed in various blog posts that became "something of a gospel among young crypto entrepreneurs." By 2014, Andreessen Horowitz had invested almost $50 million into Bitcoin-related endeavors such as the cryptocurrency exchange Coinbase. In 2022, Fortune called Dixon "the world's top crypto investor." In an October 2022 article titled "Andreessen Horowitz Went All In on Crypto at the Worst Possible Time", the Wall Street Journal reported that during the first half of 2022, the cryptocurrency fund founded by Dixon at Andreessen Horowitz had lost around 40% of its value, a decline "much larger than the 10% to 20% drops recorded by other venture funds, which have largely avoided the risky practice of purchasing volatile cryptocurrencies."

With Dixon as a General Partner overseeing his firm's crypto investments, in October 2022 he announced a new accelerator program to support crypto startups in Los Angeles.

Dixon also led the firm's investment and sits on the board of Oculus VR.

=== Read Write Own ===
Dixon's book Read Write Own: Building the Next Era of the Internet was published in January 2024. It was at No. 9 on the New York Times Best Sellers List for Combined Print & E-Book Nonfiction for the period ending February 18, 2024, though with a dagger to indicate bulk purchases. The book did not appear on any NYT lists in subsequent weeks. Andreesen Horowitz staff admitted to Vice that several of their portfolio companies had bulk-purchased the book. The book received mixed reviews.
