= PillPack =

American online pharmacy

PillPack, Inc.
- Company type: Division
- Industry: Pharmaceutical
- Founded: 2013; 13 years ago
- Founders: TJ Parker; Elliot Cohen
- Headquarters: Manchester, New Hampshire, United States
- Area served: United States
- Services: Online retailer
- Parent: Amazon
- Website: pillpack.com

PillPack, Inc. is an American online pharmacy which is a subsidiary of Amazon. It is based in Manchester, New Hampshire, United States. The company was founded in 2013.

== History ==
The company was founded in 2013 by TJ Parker and Elliot Cohen. By 2014, the IDEO-incubated company was licensed in thirty-one states and shipping medication in dosage packets with robots handling the packaging process. Software development and management were based in Somerville, Massachusetts, with pharmacy fulfillment operations at the Millyard complex in Manchester, New Hampshire, former site of the Amoskeag Manufacturing Company.

In April 2016, Express Scripts announced it would remove PillPack from its pharmacy benefit manager network at the end of the month, saying the company had misrepresented itself as a physical pharmacy rather than mail-order. PillPack alleged that Express Scripts was simply trying to give an anti-competitive advantage to its own mail-order pharmacy. PillPack launched the website FixPharmacy.com and began a publicity campaign, urging affected customers (which represented about a third of its business) to complain to Express Scripts. Express Scripts agreed to allow PillPack to remain in its network before the suspension took effect.

In June 2018, Amazon.com acquired the company for a reported US$753 million. In November 2019, the company changed its branding from "PillPack, an Amazon company" to "PillPack by Amazon Pharmacy".

In June 2019, the federal district court for Rhode Island ruled that former CVS Caremark head John Levin violated his 18-month non-compete agreement by working at PillPack in a position responsible for insurance payment negotiations.

In June 2020, PillPack announced plans to build a customer service call center in Meridian, Idaho, to expand upon its existing call center in Salt Lake City, Utah.

In December 2021, Parker and Cohen were removed from Amazon Pharmacy management. Parker was replaced in the reporting chain by Amazon Alexa vice president John Love; and Neil Lindsay, who had previously overseen Amazon Prime, was put in charge of both Amazon Pharmacy and Amazon Care. Axios described the two as being "demoted to consultants" but Amazon said it was not a demotion, and that they remain Amazon employees.

In May 2022, PillPack agreed to pay $5.79 million to the federal government and some states to settle a Department of Justice lawsuit. The complaint alleged that from April 2014 to November 2019, the company sent a larger amount of insulin to Medicare and Medicaid patients than allowed, then falsely reported the remaining supply those patients had in order to avoid penalties.
