= Dave McClure =

American entrepreneur and angel investor

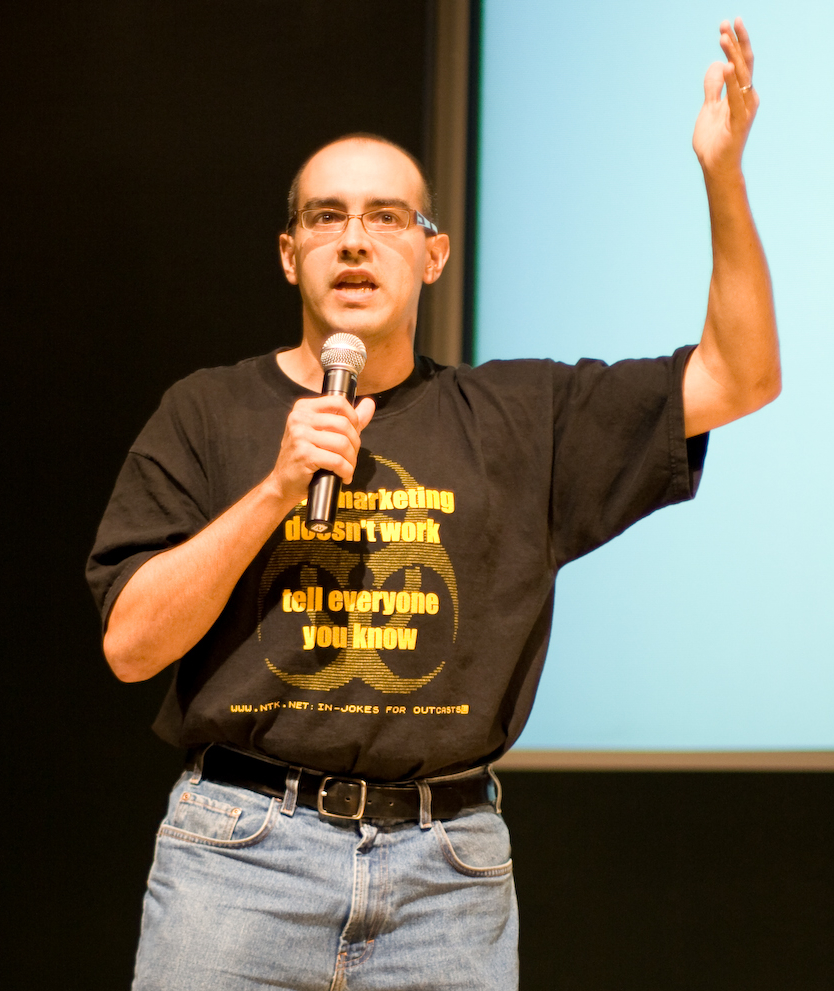
- McClure in August 2007
- Born: 1966 or 1967 (age 59–60); West Virginia, United States
- Education: Johns Hopkins University (BS)
- Occupations: Entrepreneur, angel investor

David "Dave" McClure is an entrepreneur and angel investor based in the San Francisco Bay Area, who founded the business accelerator 500 Startups (now 500 Global) and served as its CEO until his resignation in 2017. He founded Practical Venture Capital soon after, a new venture capital fund that would continue to work with companies he previously funded through 500 Startups.

== Biography ==
McClure was born in Morgantown, West Virginia and grew up in Columbia, Maryland. He graduated from Johns Hopkins University with a BS in engineering and applied mathematics in 1988 and moved to Silicon Valley in 1989. During the 1990s, he worked as a technology consultant for clients including Microsoft and Intel. In 2001, he joined PayPal as Director of Marketing, where he started the PayPal Developer Network, which opened PayPal's APIs to outside developers. From 2005 to 2006, he was Director of Marketing at Simply Hired, a job search startup. In 2007, McClure gave a five-minute presentation at Ignite Seattle titled "Startup Metrics for Pirates," which laid out a framework for measuring startup growth using five metrics abbreviated as AARRR: Acquisition, Activation, Retention, Referral, and Revenue.

McClure founded Geeks on a Plane in 2008, an invite-only startup tour that brought founders and investors to technology markets in other countries. Tours visited destinations in Brazil, India, China, Japan, Southeast Asia, and parts of Africa between 2009 and 2017 through 500 Startups. The program was relaunched in 2022 as 42Geeks, co-founded with Chok Ooi, and has organized tours to Jakarta, Singapore, and other markets.

In 2010, McClure founded 500 Startups (now 500 Global), a seed accelerator and related investment fund. Under McClure, 500 Startups made over 1,500 investments across more than 60 countries by 2016, with roughly a third of its staff based outside the United States. McClure described the fund's investment approach as similar to the statistical strategy used by the Oakland Athletics baseball team, focusing on high-volume, diversified bets rather than concentrated positions. He emphasized three areas he called the "Three Ds": design, data, and distribution. Portfolio companies that later went public include Twilio, SendGrid, The RealReal, Grab, GitLab, and Udemy.

McClure gained attention both for his opinionated blog 500 Hats (as of 2011 one of the ten most-read blogs on venture capital finance) and as one of the so-called "Super Angel" investors involved in the Angelgate controversy.

In 2019, McClure founded Practical Venture Capital, a venture capital firm focused on secondary markets. According to Bloomberg, the firm was designed to "purchase stakes in smaller funds, sometimes called micro-venture capital firms" and to "buy stakes from those funds' investors when they're seeking liquidity." Bloomberg reported the firm had an initial fundraising target of $100 million.

=== Sexual harassment allegations ===
In 2017, McClure was identified in a New York Times article, along with Chris Sacca, about sexual harassment in venture capital. He was described as sending sexually inappropriate messages to a female investor, who later sought employment at his company. In response, he stepped down from day-to-day management in a post titled "I'm a Creep. I'm Sorry". He then denied the accusations and retracted his apology in another post that was then deleted. A few days later, McClure severed all ties with 500 Startups, resigning as general partner as well. Hours after McClure resigned, a fresh allegation surfaced against him, this time of sexual assault.

McClure later created a new venture capital fund, Practical Venture Capital, which aims to buy equity in companies he funded through 500 Startups.
