= SeatGeek =

Ticket platform

- Website type: Live entertainment
- Available in: English
- Founded: New York City, New York, United States
- Headquarters: New York City, New York
- Area served: Worldwide
- Creators: Jack Groetzinger (CEO); Russell D'Souza (President, Supply); Eric Waller (CPO)
- Key people: Brian Murphy (CTO); Brad Tacy (CFO); Taylor Lamme (CPO)
- Employees: 800+
- Website: seatgeek.com
- Launched: September 14, 2009
- Current status: Active

SeatGeek is a ticketing platform headquartered in New York City that enables users to buy and sell tickets for live sports, concerts, and theater events through its website and mobile app. Originally launched as an aggregator of listings on the secondary ticketing market, the company now operates as both a secondary marketplace and a primary ticketing provider for sports teams and live event venues, and has emerged as a competitor to Ticketmaster in selling tickets directly on behalf of teams.

Its box office clients include several major professional sports teams such as the Dallas Cowboys, Arizona Cardinals, New Orleans Saints, Baltimore Ravens, Cleveland Cavaliers, New Orleans Pelicans, Florida Panthers and the majority of clubs across the English Premier League, including Liverpool F.C. and Manchester City F.C. The platform also handles all of ticketing, including concerts, for large venues like AT&T Stadium and Rocket Arena. Theater clients include Jujamcyn Theaters, which operates five of the 41 Broadway theatres in New York City, and Lloyd Webber Theatre Group in London.

== History ==
=== 2009 - 2015: Founding ===
SeatGeek was founded in 2009 by Russell D’Souza and Jack Groetzinger while participating in DreamIt Ventures, a startup accelerator program in Philadelphia. The company launched publicly in September of that year at the TechCrunch50 conference, where it was recognized by VentureBeat and CNET as one of the top startups of the event. In May, the company had received $20,000 in seed funding from DreamIT Ventures. Later, Eric Waller joined as SeatGeek's first employee and third co-founder.

Initially focused on aggregating ticket listings from the secondary market, SeatGeek raised several rounds of seed and Series A financing during 2010 and 2011 to expand its platform. The company later announced an investment from Ashton Kutcher and Guy Oseary’s A-Grade Investments. During this early period, SeatGeek's co-founders, D’Souza and Groetzinger, were named among Bloomberg BusinessWeek’s “America’s Best Young Entrepreneurs” and featured in Business Insider’s “Silicon Alley 100: New York’s Coolest Tech People.”

In 2013, SeatGeek announced the acquisition of FanSnap, a competing ticket search engine. SeatGeek discontinued the FanSnap search engine and rolled it into their existing ticket search platform. Later that year it announced a partnership with Telecharge, a Broadway ticketing service.

By 2015, SeatGeek had attracted significant venture backing, including a $62 million Series C funding round led by Technology Crossover Ventures. The investment supported the company’s expansion beyond its original role as a ticket aggregator and positioned it to compete directly with StubHub as a resale ticket marketplace.

=== 2016–2017: Entrance into Primary Ticketing ===
In 2016, SeatGeek entered the primary ticketing market, positioning itself as a competitor to Ticketmaster. That July, the company signed a league-wide agreement with Major League Soccer to create an open ticketing network that allowed third-party websites to sell tickets to MLS matches. As part of the deal, SeatGeek became the official ticketing provider for Sporting Kansas City, making the club its first primary box office partner.

The company expanded its primary ticketing business in 2017. Seattle Sounders FC announced that SeatGeek would become its official ticketing partner, and later that year the company was selected as the primary ticketing provider for the New Orleans Saints and New Orleans Pelicans. SeatGeek also acquired Toptix, an Israeli ticketing software company founded by Eli Dagan and Yehuda Yuval, to strengthen its box office technology capabilities.

=== 2018–2019: International Expansion and Innovation Awards ===
In 2018, SeatGeek became a distribution partner of the National Football League (NFL), allowing the company to sell verified tickets through its marketplace. A month later, the company announced that it replaced Ticketmaster as the primary box office partner of the Dallas Cowboys. That same year, SeatGeek reached a naming rights agreement with the Chicago Fire’s stadium in Bridgeview, Illinois, which was renamed SeatGeek Stadium. In the United Kingdom, Premier League club Manchester City selected SeatGeek as its exclusive ticketing provider for both men’s and women’s matches. In 2019, it was also appointed the official ticketing partner of Lord's Cricket Ground in London, marking its entry into the cricket market.

SeatGeek was also named one of Fast Company’s “Most Innovative Companies” in the live events category in both 2018 and 2019.

=== 2020–2021: Pandemic and Series E Funding ===
In March 2020, Liverpool F.C. announced a primary ticketing partnership with SeatGeek. The following month, the company faced a class action lawsuit over refunds for events canceled during the COVID-19 pandemic. Plaintiffs alleged that SeatGeek had refused to issue cash refunds, but the company denied wrongdoing, maintaining that it acted in accordance with its published terms of use and had provided customers with the option of receiving cash. The case was later settled and closed. Later that year, it introduced “SeatGeek Adapt,” a suite of products designed to support social distancing, timed entry, and mobile concessions ordering at reduced-capacity venues.

In 2021, Jujamcyn Theaters selected SeatGeek as its primary ticketing provider, marking the company’s first Broadway partnership. Former Women's National Basketball Association president Laurel J. Richie also joined its board of directors. That year SeatGeek launched “Rally,” an in-app platform that allowed fans to order concessions, book rideshares, and access stadium guides. Rally debuted with the Cleveland Cavaliers at Rocket Arena and was later adopted by Austin FC at Q2 Stadium. That year the company became the primary ticketing partner of the Brooklyn Nets and supplied the primary ticketing technology used for all events at Barclays Center. That fall, it introduced “SeatGeek Swaps,” a feature allowing ticket holders to return tickets for credit up to 72 hours before an event.

In October, SeatGeek announced plans to go public through a special-purpose acquisition company (SPAC) merger valued at $1.35 billion. The deal was later terminated, and in 2022 SeatGeek instead raised $238 million in a Series E funding round led by Accel, with participation from Wellington Management, Arctos Partners, and Qualtrics founder Ryan Smith, valuing the company at about $1 billion.

=== 2022–2024: Partnerships and Product Development ===
In 2022, SeatGeek added new primary ticketing partners, including the Washington Commanders and Baltimore Ravens of the NFL, the Utah Jazz of the NBA, and the Florida Panthers of the NHL. That year, the company was also named one of Fast Company’s “Most Innovative Companies” in the live events category for the third time, having previously received the recognition in 2018 and 2019.

In January 2023, Billboard reported that Brooklyn Sports Entertainment Global, the parent of Barclay's Center, ended its partnership with SeatGeek after technical issues led to disappointing concert ticket sales. Ticketmaster resumed ticketing at Barclays Center starting that year. During a Senate Judiciary Committee hearing on ticketing competition, SeatGeek CEO Jack Groetzinger cited the decision as an example of Live Nation’s ability to pressure venues that partnered Ticketmaster competitors. In February 2023, SeatGeek replaced StubHub as the official secondary marketplace for Paciolan, the largest ticketing company in college athletics, and integrated its resale platform with Paciolan’s primary ticketing system. That same month, Major League Baseball named SeatGeek its official ticket marketplace, giving the company partnerships across all major North American sports leagues and again displacing StubHub.

The following month, SeatGeek signed a primary ticketing deal with the Tennessee Titans, its sixth NFL team, and later that year entered into a tour-wide ticketing partnership with the LPGA, covering all U.S.-based tournaments. SeatGeek also reached an agreement with the PGA of America to become its official ticketing supplier for championship events including the PGA Championship, the KPMG Women’s PGA Championship, and the Ryder Cup. SeatGeek also received workplace recognition during this time. In May 2023, the company was named to Inc. Magazine’s list of Best Workplaces for the second consecutive year.

The company continued to expand into new markets in 2024. In September, SeatGeek was announced as the official ticketing partner of the Utah Mammoth, the NHL’s newest franchise, which joined existing SeatGeek NHL client the Florida Panthers. During this period, SeatGeek also introduced several new product features. In February 2024, it launched Next Fan Up, which included an AI-powered “Smart Pricing” tool designed to help fans list and resell tickets more easily. In August, it released Parties, a ticket-sharing feature intended to simplify group attendance at live events. As of May 2026, the Better Business Bureau gave SeatGeek an "A" rating; the company became BBB Accredited the same month. At the same time, the company held a 4.5 out of 5 rating on Trustpilot based on more than 14,000 customer reviews.

=== 2025 - Present ===
In 2025, SeatGeek launched Concourse Maps, a venue navigation tool within its Rally platform that allows fans to locate concessions, merchandise, and other amenities. Later that year, it released Beyond the Seat, a feature designed to enhance ticket listings with richer visuals and details of premium experiences.

During the same period, Premier League club AFC Bournemouth announced it would transition to SeatGeek’s ticketing system beginning with the 2025–26 season. The United States Golf Association selected the company as the official ticketing provider for its championships, including the U.S. Open, U.S. Women’s Open, and U.S. Senior Open, starting in 2026. In Major League Soccer, the Philadelphia Union entered into a multi-year partnership that will make SeatGeek its official ticketing partner beginning in 2026.

SeatGeek also implemented all-in pricing across its platform, displaying ticket prices inclusive of fees in accordance with new Federal Trade Commission guidelines on price transparency.

=== FanSnap ===
FanSnap
- Type: Subsidiary
- Industry: Internet
- Founded: Palo Alto, California (2007)
- Successors: SeatGeek
- Headquarters: New York, New York, United States
- Area served: Worldwide
- Products: FanSnap
- Owner: SeatGeek

FanSnap was an online search engine for live event tickets, based in Palo Alto, California. Founded in 2007, FanSnap aggregated event-level ticket data from event ticket providers. FanSnap's search engine combined results from ticket issuers and various providers in the ticket resale industry including ticket resale marketplaces such as RazorGator, StubHub, TicketNetwork and eBay, as well as ticket brokers including Ace Ticket, AllShows.com, Barry's Tickets, Gold Coast Tickets and Las Vegas Tickets.

FanSnap did not sell tickets directly to its end-users. Instead, it aggregated event-level ticket data from ticket providers, presented that data in response to user searches and directed users to third-party ticket providers for purchase. FanSnap generated revenue through cost per click and cost per action advertising based upon its referral of users to such third-party ticket providers.

FanSnap was acquired by NexTag in December 2011.

FanSnap was then acquired from Nextag/Wize Commerce by rival ticket search engine SeatGeek in November 2013 for an undisclosed sum. As part of the acquisition, the main FanSnap ticket search engine was discontinued and rolled into SeatGeek's existing ticket search offerings.

== Technology and functioning ==
Initially launched as a ticket search engine, SeatGeek has grown from an aggregator to a primary ticket seller, instituting a platform that allows artists, sports teams, and others to sell tickets directly through the site. Tickets are sorted using the company's DealScore algorithm which finds the combination of best available price and seat location for a particular event. Historically, SeatGeek provided price forecast information in a similar manner to Farecast, an airline ticket aggregation and forecasting site purchased by Microsoft in 2008. SeatGeek has seen success in the mobile space, adopting Apple Pay to provide seamless purchase and payment.

SeatGeek's app offers customizable widgets and integrations with Lyft, Snapchat and other services through its proprietary platform called Rally. Features on Rally include an integration where fans can order mobile food and beverage from their seats, rideshares on Lyft, as well as see venue guides and weather reports before the event.

== Awards and recognition ==
- PC Magazine's "The Top 100 Web Sites of 2010".
- Founders Russell D'Souza and Jack Groetzinger were named in Bloomberg BusinessWeek's "America's Best Young Entrepreneurs 2010."
- Founders Jack Groetzinger and Russ D'Souza named to Business Insider's "The Silicon Alley 100: New York's Coolest Tech People In 2010"
- SeatGeek was named one of Fast Company's Most Innovative Companies for Live Events in 2018, 2019, and 2022.
- In 2019, SeatGeek was honored in the Crain's New York Business Fast 50, though it declined to disclose whether or not it was profitable.
- In 2020, SeatGeek was named one of the "hottest brands in influencer marketing" by Insider.com.
- SeatGeek Enterprise's Danielle Du Toit was named a 2020 GameChanger by Sports Business Journal in August 2020.
