= The Trade Desk =

U.S. ad exchange demand side platform

The Trade Desk, Inc.
- Type: Public
- Traded as: Nasdaq: TTD (Class A); S&P 600 component
- Industry: Digital marketing; Online advertising; Software; SaaS
- Founded: 2009; 17 years ago
- Founders: Jeff Green; Dave Pickles
- Headquarters: Ventura, California, U.S.
- Number of locations: 30+ (2026)
- Key people: Jeff Green (CEO); Dave Pickles (CTO)
- Products: Digital advertising; media buying
- Revenue: ▲US$2.44 billion (2024)
- Operating income: ▲US$427 million (2024)
- Net income: ▲US$393 million (2024)
- Total assets: ▲US$6.11 billion (2024)
- Total equity: ▲US$2.95 billion (2024)
- Number of employees: 3,900 (2025)
- Website: thetradedesk.com

The Trade Desk, Inc. (TTD) is an American multinational technology company that produces and services programmatic marketing automation with personalized real-time digital content. Headquartered in Ventura, California, it is the largest independent demand-side platform (DSP) in the world. TTD operates with over 400 partners at more than 30 locations worldwide.

== Overview ==
TTD operates an omnichannel platform with data analytics capabilities and support, online platforms, media formats, enterprise APIs, and self-service publishing for brands and advertisers. Competing with Google, Facebook Ads, and others, its personalized ad content is utilized by Disney, NBCU, Roku, Walmart and Spotify.

== History ==
=== Founding - IPO, 2009-2015 ===
The Trade Desk was co-founded in 2009 by Jeff Green and David Pickles. They met at Microsoft, after its acquisition of Green's real-time digital advertising auction firm, AdECN, in 2007.

In 2012, the company was included as a key partner in Facebook's launch of the real-time bidding (RTB) advertising platform, Facebook Exchange.

In 2015, The Trade Desk was named among the top 10 of America's Most Promising Companies by Forbes. Founders Green and Pickles were also named as Ernst & Young Entrepreneurs of The Year 2015 in the Greater Los Angeles region.

=== Public company, 2016–present ===
On September 21, 2016, The Trade Desk became a public company. The company reached a market cap of US$40 billion by 2021. The Trade Desk integrated connected TV buying and measurement directly into its platform in 2017; acquired marketing insights firm AdBrain. The firm also improved transparency in programmatic buying by enabling buyers to see all selling or reselling parties to a bid request.

In 2018, the firm launched its programmatic ad buying platform in China, which provides partnership access between marketers and Chinese media companies, such as Alibaba, Tencent and Baidu Exchange Services. It also launched new AI tools: an AI forecasting engine named Koa, a new user interface, new tools for mapping strategies called The Trade Desk Planner, and a proprietary global user identity resolution tool called Unified ID.

In 2019, Amazon opened connected TV (CTV) Apps integrated with Amazon Publisher Services, enabling the purchase of ad inventory for third-party TV content provider The Trade Desk, through Amazon Fire TV devices. That September, The Trade Desk launched an advertising campaign, "Media for Humankind", to position itself as a "more transparent digital advertising" alternative to Google and Facebook.

In mid-2020, Unified ID 2.0 (UID 2.0) launched as a second iteration to leverage a post-cookie internet using encrypted email and phone number data to create a secure identity standard. The identity resolution software was adopted by Disney and Paramount, as well as by major advertisers, including Procter & Gamble and Unilever.

In early 2022, The Trade Desk launched OpenPath, granting advertisers direct access to its premium digital advertising inventory. Publishers using OpenPath include Conde Nast, Reuters, and The Washington Post. The Trade Desk launched Kokaia, a new media buying platform that integrates advances in distributed AI, measurement, and deep learning algorithms with digital media buying, in June 2023.

In March 2024, NBCUniversal announced that its broadcast content for the Paris 2024 Summer Olympics would be available, in partnership with The Trade Desk, to online automated programmatic marketers, for the first time. That May, Netflix announced its first expansion of its advertising partnerships to include The Trade Desk, Magnite, and Google DV360 (formerly DoubleClick).

TTD announced OpenSincera, in May 2025, an API to generate metadata on advertising quality and the health of the digital advertising supply chain. That year, TTD also added a "Deal Desk" to its Kokai platform, designed for advertisers to manage deals directly with publishers. The Trade Desk was added to the S&P 500 Index in July 2025. It has consistently been named to annual lists by, among others, Fortune magazine. It was included in the Forbes Global 2000 in 2022, and ranked 22nd on TIME's "America’s Growth Leaders of 2026" list.

=== Financials ===
The Trade Desk raised about $120 million of venture capital (VC) from investors by 2016, including from VC firms Founder Collective and IA Ventures, and investors Jerry Neumann and Josh Stylman. In 2017, revenue rose 52 percent to $308 million, then rose to $477 million in 2018. In 2019, third-quarter revenue was reported as $164 million, attributed to the growth of connected TV advertising.

It reported a 95% customer retention rate for 27 straight quarters in 2020, and an annual revenue of US$836 million in the same year. The Trade Desk finished 2022 with a total spent on the platform of $7.8 billion, and annual revenue of over $1.5 billion.

After 33 consecutive earning periods of meeting or exceeding financial expectations, TTD performed below analyst expectations by about 2%, in Q4 2024, and stock value decreased by more than 32% in February 2025. The Trade Desk's revenues for the quarter were $741 million; total 2024 revenues grew 26%, to $2.4 billion; company stock rebounded in the first quarter of 2025. The stock has since fallen to 5 year lows in late 2026, and recently had a 15% workforce reduction in early September 2026.

== See also ==
- List of advertising technology companies
