= List of image-sharing websites =

This article presents a non-exhaustive list of notable image-sharing websites.

== Active image-sharing websites ==
Name	Location / Owner / Hoster	Description/Focus/Registration requirements	iOS	Android	Windows Phone	Other	Registered users	Storage Space Allowed Per User (standard)
500px	Canada / Amazon AWS (hosting)	Free, registration required	Yes	Yes	Yes	ChromeOS	13,000,000	7 uploads/week free plan, unlimited for paid accounts
Cloudinary	San Jose, California	Free, registration required, subscription option to provides additional limits and features.					10,000	3 Users / 1 Account, 25 monthly credits for free plan
Dayviews	Sweden / Dayviews AB (Bilddagboken AB)	Free image hosting, registration required	Yes	Yes	Yes		1,291,500	Unlimited storage for 547×410 pix reduced images, also unlimited resolution and size for paying BDB HD users, costing approximately equivalent to $10.50 a year.
DeviantArt	United States	Free image hosting, registration required. Subscription option provides additional services, and unlocks hidden features. Generally allows art-specific content only, as the service is not a generic image hosting service.					44,000,000	Unlimited uploads with 30 MB limit per image for all account types.
Dronestagram	France	Free, Dronestagram is a photo sharing community dedicated to drone photography. The site that has been described as "Instagram for drones", allows hobbyists to share their geo-referenced aerial photos and videos.	Yes	No	No		30,000	
Facebook	United States		Yes	Yes			1B	Unlimited
Flickr	Founded in Vancouver, Canada. Since it has been purchased by entities in the United States with the current owner being SmugMug.	Photologging/hosting Free registration/Pro service	Yes	Yes	Yes		112,000,000 (May 2015)	Since 20 May 2013, 1TB free, 200MB per image, all photos display, original files downloadable. Starting January 8 of 2019, free accounts will be limited to 1000 images. The 1TB limit for Pro accounts will be removed.
Fotki	Estonia / Fotki, Inc.	Free registration photo sharing service and communication portal.	Yes	Yes			1,250,000	50MB for free, unlimited storage for $30/year.
Geograph Britain and Ireland	United Kingdom / Geograph Project Limited	Geo-located Geographical Images whole of Britain and Ireland, free, registration required					12,634	Unlimited
Google Photos		Image and video hosting service.					500,000,000	Files use a storage quota (15 GB free).
Instagram	United States / Facebook	Photologging/Social networking . Registration is required.	Yes	Yes	Yes		100,000,000	Owned by Facebook
Imgur	United States	Free image hosting, no registration required.	Yes	Yes			Unknown	From 9 Feb 2015 all Imgur accounts are treated as Imgur pro accounts. No limits.
Ipernity	France	Photo, video & blog sharing. Operated by the world's largest non-commercial photo sharing community, without profit interest, advertising, data trading or sale of any content.	No	Yes			2,500,000	100 GB for €44,90/year (Standard), including unlimited uploads, geo-mapping, picture processing (PicMonkey) and the worlds best integrated translator (DeepL). Basic subscription with reduced limits and features for €22,90/year.
jAlbum	Sweden	Free hosting of galleries created with jAlbum software.	Yes				340,000	30MB of space given for free accounts, upgrade to 1GB space for €19/year.
Photobucket	United States	Free registration service. As of July 2017, payment of $400/year required if hosted images are to be displayed on external sites	Yes	Yes			50,000,000	With a free account, the user can use up to 10GB of bandwidth per month and 2GB storage. Unlimited free storage, 1MB per photo and 10 minutes per video (with image size restrictions). No size restrictions with Pro account.
Pinterest	United States	Photo sharing/social networking					11,700,000	Unknown
Pixabay	Germany	Sharing of high-quality public domain photos. Free to browse and download, registration required to contribute. Includes social networking capabilities.					Unknown	Unknown
Pixelfed	Federated (ActivityPub)	Free, open-source, decentralized photo sharing. Privacy-focused and ad-free. Part of the Fediverse. Registration required.	Yes	Yes	No		993,684	Varies by instance.
SecureTribe	United States	Free registration service	Yes	No	No	No	13,800,000	Secure photo/video sharing
Shutterfly	United States	Free registration service					2,000,000	Free, unlimited picture storage. Shared Albums are limited to 1,000 photos. Full resolution downloads only possible via purchase of archive DVD.
SmugMug	United States	Free search, subscription hosting					315,000	"unlimited" storage
Snapfish	United States / Hewlett-Packard	Free registration service, also provides services for Costco's online photo processing store.					90,000,000	unlimited, pay per download
Unsplash	Founded in Montreal, Quebec, Canada by Unsplash, Inc. While still operated in Montreal, it is now owned by United States based Getty Images.	Free, registration required to upload pictures. Unsplash license only. It's similar to CC0, but the user can't use the pictures to replicate a similar or competing service.		Yes			Unknown	Unknown
VK	Russia	Free, Russian social network	Yes	Yes				Unlimited
Wikimedia Commons	United States	Free, Creative Commons license, Public domain	Yes	Yes	Yes			Unlimited

== Defunct photo-sharing websites ==
These also include sites that may still operate, but do not accept new users. Listed in chronological order of shutdown.

Name	Location/Owner (if any)	Description/Focus/Registration requirements	Date closed	Status/Notes	Registered users	Storage Space Allowed Per User (standard)
Album2	Oslo, Norway / Sveinung Dammen	Free 30 day trial, registration required	2021	Domain is for sale via godaddy.com	2,000	150 prints/year
Zooomr	United States / BlueBridge Technologies Group	No registration service since 2007.	2007	Users are no longer accepted.	100,000	Unlimited uploads and unlimited storage for ALL users.
Radar.net		Free registration.	May 26, 2010	Radar shut down on May 26, 2010 at noon (PDT).	Unknown	?
GazoPa Bloom		Flower photo sharing service	2011		Unknown	?
Fotopic.net	UK/Snappy Designs Ltd		March 8, 2011		Unknown	
Ovi Share	Finland / Nokia	Nokia's multimedia sharing service, formerly called Twango. Service closed on May 30, 2012.	May 30, 2012	Other Nokia services still available with the registered account.	20,000,000	unlimited, pay per download
MobileMe Web Gallery	United States / Apple Inc.	Subscription service. Ended June 30, 2012	June 30, 2012	For an advertised "limited time", data was still able to be retrieved from MobileMe until July 31, 2012, when the site finally closed completely. Services moved to iCloud on June 30.	180,000	10GB (standard level)
Kodak Gallery	United States	Free registration service, archiving photo service for $25/year.	July 2, 2012	(Closed down on July 2, 2012; all accounts moved over to Shutterfly)	20,000,000	Used to be unlimited low-resolution, paid users can download high-res images that they've uploaded. New minimum purchase requirements 3/09: $4.99/yr for 2GB or less, $19.99/yr for more than 2GB.
Webshots	United States	Free registration service. (Discontinued on December 1, 2012, including paid service.)	December 1, 2012	All old user photos from accounts not migrated to Shutterfly were deleted. Webshots still operates in other fields, and is owned by Threefold Photos.	32,000,000	One 800×600 image per day
Pixorial	United States	Personal photo and video sharing platform. Registration required. Free subscription available.	July 18, 2014	No new accounts being accepted.	636,000	Free subscription available with 7 GB of storage for photos or videos. No limits on resolution of images or length of videos. Additional paid subscriptions available with increased storage. Unlimited uploads of photos or videos.
Lockerz	United States	Free registration service	2014		19,000,000	Unlimited uploads for all users; 5MB per image
Bayimg	Sweden / The Pirate Bay	Free image hosting, no registration required, uncensored	2014	Temporarily reopened in 2016 for file recovery.		
imm.io	United States / Autodesk	Free image hosting, images removed if not viewed in the last 30 days.	February 3, 2014		Unknown	
Streamzoo	United States	Mobile photosocial game, free registration service, unlimited storage and sharing, available on Apple iOS, Android and Web	March 21, 2014	All services stopped and photos deleted.	Unknown	Unlimited
Trovebox	United States / Wide Angle Labs, Inc.	Free image hosting, registration required. Subscription option provides additional features.	March 31, 2015		Unknown	100 photo uploads per month for free users, unlimited for Pro accounts. 30MB per photo.
Panoramio	Headquartered in Switzerland / Google	Free registration service	November 4, 2016		4,700,000	Unlimited provided the photos comply with the Google Earth Photo Acceptance Policy.
Phanfare	United States / Carbonite	Subscription-based photo sharing	May 28, 2017	Phanfare and SmugMug have worked out a transition plan.		Unlimited storage. Subscription accounts only. Bought out by Carbonite.
yfrog	United States / ImageShack	Twitter photo sharing. Registration required. As of 2011 holds approximately 29% of the Twitter photo sharing market.	?			
TinyPic	United States / PhotoBucket	Free image hosting, no registration required	September 9, 2019	All services stopped. Uploaded photos downloadable up until September 19, 2019.	Unknown	No known limit, but largest image dimension limited to 1600 pixels.

== Comparison of photo-sharing websites ==
Legend:

- File formats: the image or video formats allowed for uploading
- IPTC support: support for the IPTC image header
  - Yes - IPTC headers are read upon upload and exposed via the web interface; properties such as captions and keywords are written back to the IPTC header and saved along with the photo when downloading or e-mailing it
  - Some - IPTC headers are read but information added via the web interface is not saved back to the IPTC header; or, IPTC headers are lost on resizing
- Tags/keywords: the ability to add to and search by tags or keywords
- Comments: the ability of users to leave comments on the photo
  - Yes - full control over who can leave comments (friends, registered users, non-registered users)
  - Some - users must register with the website to leave comments
- Rating:
  - Yes - star rating: the ability to rate photos numerically, usually on a scale from 1 to 5
  - Some - thumbs up/down rating, "mark as favorite", or a rating system accessible only to logged-in users
- Download originals:
  - Yes - anyone can download the original photo
  - Some - only photos of "pro" members can be downloaded
- Notes/annotations: the ability to overlay textual notes to areas of a photo
- Friendly URLs: human-readable URLs (e.g. /photos/greece_album/athens.jpg) vs. numeric identifiers (MemViewImage.asp?AID=5610943&IID=205062034&INUM=5&ICT=5&IPP=16)
- Subscriptions
  - Some - RSS feeds and web interface
  - Yes - RSS feeds, web interface, plus photo updates can be sent by e-mail to non-registered members

Name	File formats	Upload	Folder/ album structure	Limitations	IPTC support	Tags/ keywords	Comments	Rating	Download originals	Notes	Geo- tagging	Friendly URLs	API	Custom layout	Subscriptions
Flickr	JPEG, GIF, PNG, (TIFF displayed as JPEG, compressed up to 58:1 for a 16bpc TIFF)		collections contain albums	After 20 MAY 2013, 1TB free, 200MB per image, all photos display, original files downloadable.	Some	Yes	Some	Some	Some	arbitrary notes	Yes	No	Flickr Services	No	RSS
Fotki	Animated GIF, JPEG, PNG; BMP and TIFF are converted to JPEG	e-mail, FTP, Java, browser (mass/fetch from URL; upload one photo at a time), desktop app (basic), desktop image viewers	hierarchical folders contain folders or albums	50MB for non-paying users; can get 20MB extra/month; filenames are truncated to 34 characters	Some	Yes	Yes	No	Some	No	Yes	Some	Fotki full help	registered users	RSS, Web
ImageShack	JPEG, PNG, GIF, BMP, TIFF, mkv, mp4, MOV, AVI, MPEG, wm, 3gp, flv	browser (one at a time), browser (multiple, zipped)	flat slideshows	free users: 5GB storage 5MB/image limit; subscribers: 3MB/image limit	No	Some	Some	Yes		No	No	Some			
OneDrive	JPEG, ?	HTTP, Silverlight	albums	100MB per photo (7GB total)	No	Yes	Some	Some	Yes	Yes	No	No	Yes	No	No
Picasa Web Albums	Animated GIF, JPEG, PNG	browser, Google+, Picasa, Exporter for iPhoto, the Aperture to Picasa Web Albums plug-in, Uploader on Mac OS X, or F-Spot on Linux	flat albums	Unlimited for photos smaller than a certain resolution; 1GB free for larger photos; Additional storage for monthly fee.	Some	Yes	Some	No	Yes	face recognition	Yes	friendly album/path, numeric filename		No	RSS
Shutterfly	JPEG only	Flash batch	flat albums		No, even Exif support is incomplete	via desktop app (Shutterfly Studio)	Some		No			No		multiple templates	
SmugMug	JPEG, TIFF, PNG, GIF, Video			12MB per Photo (Standard/Power), 24MB per Photo (Pro and during 14 day trial)	Some	Yes	Yes	Yes	Yes	No	Yes	Yes	Yes	Yes	
Snapfish	JPEG only				No	No	?	No	$0.25/photo	No					
Webshots	JPEG, ?			5,400 photos, 540 videos	No	Yes	Some	Some	Some	No	No			No	

== See also ==
- Digital photo frame
- File-hosting service
- File sharing
- Image hosting service
- Image sharing
- List of photo and video apps
- Timeline of file sharing
