= 2nd Shorty Awards =

Awards show for short-form social web media content

The 2nd Annual Shorty Awards
- Date: March 3, 2010
- Location: The Times Center, New York City
- Hosted by: Rick Sanchez

Voting for the second Shorty Awards opened on January 5, 2010, in 26 official categories. A Real-Time Photo of the Year category was added to the list of official categories for the first time, recognizing the best photo posted to services such as Twitpic, Yfrog, or Facebook.

The second Shorty Awards competition introduced a panel of judges called the Real-Time Academy of Short Form Arts & Sciences whose members were Craig Newmark, David Pogue, Kurt Andersen, Caterina Fake, Joi Ito, Frank Moss, Alberto Ibargüen, Sreenath Sreenivasan, MC Hammer, Alyssa Milano and Jimmy Wales. After public nominations determined the finalists, the academy decided on the winners.

Winners were announced at a ceremony held in the Times Center in The New York Times building in Manhattan, and were streamed online. The ceremony was hosted by CNN anchor Rick Sanchez, who presented awards in the official categories as well as the newly added Real-Time Photo of the Year and a special humanitarian award.

== Winners ==
The second annual winners by category:

Category	Winner
Best in Advertising	Frank Adman, @FrankAdman
Best in Apps	TweetDeck, @TweetDeck
Best in Art	deviantART, @deviantART
Best Brand	Whole Foods, @WholeFoods & Sesame Street, @sesamestreet
Best Celebrity	Nathan Fillion, @NathanFillion
Best Cultural Institution	Lewis Ginter Botanical Garden, @lewisginter & Reduced Shakespeare Company, @reduced
Best in Customer Service	Bonnie Smalley, @ComcastBonnie
Best in Design	Smashing Magazine, @smashingmag
Best in Entertainment	True Blood HBO, @TrueBloodHBO
Best in Finance	The Suze Orman Show, @SuzeOrmanShow
Best in Food	Foodimentary, @Foodimentary
Best in Government	Cory Booker, @CoryBooker
Best in Health	Rachael Dunlop, @DrRachie
Best in Humor	Mrs. Stephen Fry, @MrsStephenFry & David Thorne, @27bslash6
Best in Innovation	Betty Draper, @BettyDraper
Best in Literature	Arjun Basu, @arjunbasu
Best Journalist	William Bonner, @realwbonner & Rachel Maddow, @maddow
Best in Music	Ivete Sangalo, @ivetesangalo & Ted Leo, @tedleo
Best in News	The Diane Rehm Show, @drshow
Best Nonprofit	TWLOHA, @TWLOHA
Best in Politics	The Nation, @thenation
Best in Science	Jen Scheer, @flyingjenny
Best in Sports	Bill Simmons, @sportsguy33
Best in Tech	Soldier Knows Best, @SoldierKnowBest
Best in Travel	Twitchhiker, @twitchhiker
Best in Weird	The Llama, @DoWhatITellYou

=== Special awards ===
Category	Winner
Real-Time Photo of the Year	Janis Krums, @jkrums for "Plane on the Hudson"
Special Humanitarian Award	Carel Pedre, @carelpedre
