= TinyPic =

Former free image hosting website

- Website type: Image hosting service
- Available in: English
- Dissolved: September 16, 2019; 7 years ago
- Owner: Photobucket
- Website: tinypic.com
- Commercial: Yes
- Registration: Optional
- Launched: April 25, 2004; 22 years ago
- Current status: Discontinued

Old logo of TinyPic

TinyPic was a photo- and video-sharing service owned and operated by Photobucket that allowed users to upload, link, and share images and videos on the Internet. The idea was similar to URL shortening, in that each uploaded image was given a relatively short internet address. An account was not required to use TinyPic.

The service shut down on September 9, 2019 due to declining income.

== Images and videos ==
TinyPic allowed the upload and hosting of JPEG (jpg), png, gif, and TIFF files. Images larger than 1,600 pixels (either in width or height) were automatically resized to the largest acceptable size while maintaining their original aspect ratio. The site required a CAPTCHA to be filled in each time an image was uploaded.

TinyPic did not accept standard-definition video files which are larger than 500 megabytes in size or longer than 15 minutes in length. Videos longer than 15 minutes were truncated to 15 minutes. Users could also upload high-definition videos as long as they were no larger than 500 megabytes in size and no longer than 5 minutes in length. TinyPic officially accepted the uploading of videos in the following video formats: 3g2, 3gp, 3gp2, 3gpp, 3p, asf, avi, divx, dv, dvx, flv, moov, mov, mp4, mpe, mpeg4, mpeg, mpg4, mpg, qt, rm, wmv, and xvid and generally users were able to upload all but the most unusual formats.

TinyPic also deleted images and videos that were not associated with a user account and that had not been viewed for 90 days. TinyPic would sometimes reuse URLs of deleted images, resulting in old image links showing unintended content.

== Service interruptions ==
In July 2010, TinyPic blocked access to the site to users from Argentina, cutting off thousands of users to access, view, or delete their stored images. As of August 2010, no statement has been released from TinyPic nor any of the numerous users' questions replied; instead, a sign appears upon accessing the website inviting users to join Photobucket, but without giving any solutions for the users' stored images and videos.

On September 23, 2010, TinyPic blocked uploads from "international locations" (i.e. locations outside of the USA, UK, Australia, Canada, and others) and that all links are turned off.

TinyPic gave the following explanation on its homepage in regards to the issues on September 23, 2010: "We heard from many of our users in regards to these changes and we appreciate your feedback. TinyPic has restored linking to your images and enabled uploading. Please rest assured no content was removed from the site. We tried to notify users on TinyPic and requested they move their content to Photobucket. Unfortunately this messaging was insufficient and has taken many of our users by surprise and we apologize. Our intent was to begin combining some of the best features of TinyPic and Photobucket, thereby offering users a better experience. Any changes in the future will be better communicated. Once again, we apologize for the inconvenience."

== Shutdown ==
In July 2019, a message appeared on the homepage announcing that the service would be shutting down later that same year. The message cited decreasing advertising revenues which had made it impractical to continue with a free service, and recommended that users switch to its sister site Photobucket. Photobucket had abandoned free image hosting in 2017 and requires payment to host images.

On September 9, 2019, TinyPic was officially shut down with a period to allow existing users prior to the shutdown date to download all their photos up until September 19, 2019.

== See also ==
- Image hosting service
- Photobucket
- Image sharing
- TwitPic
- Yfrog
- List of image-sharing websites
