= Yahoo Photos =

Photo sharing service, 2000 to 2007

Yahoo! Photos
- Website type: Photo sharing
- Dissolved: September 20, 2007
- Successor: Flickr
- Owner: Yahoo!
- Website: http://photos.yahoo.com/ (archived)
- Commercial: Yes
- Launched: March 28, 2000
- Current status: Closed indefinitely

Yahoo! Photos was a photo sharing service launched on March 28, 2000 and owned by Yahoo!, designed specifically for Yahoo! users. Users created individual photo albums, categorized their photos and placed them in the corresponding albums. Users were also able to set access of their albums by publishing them for the viewing pleasure of everyone, disabling access, or marking them as private folders for their own viewing.

The service had unlimited storage for photos, but it was required that photos have the jpeg/jpg extension. In an effort to make it simpler and more efficient, Yahoo had an uploader tool to drag and drop the pictures from one's computer to Yahoo! Photos web page. In March 2005, Yahoo! purchased Flickr, and closed Yahoo! Photos on September 20, 2007 at 9:00 PM (PDT).

== Shutdown ==
On June 16, 2007, Yahoo! Photos issued a press release stating that it would be terminating on September 20, 2007, in order to focus their efforts on Flickr.

Yahoo! Photos had proposed a number of alternatives for customers who wanted to move their photos to other services.

Several independent users have derived alternative solutions for migration of their photographs uploaded at Yahoo! Photos:

- Download Hi Resolution Yahoo! Photos by Rohit Sud,
- Download Yahoo! Photos by Kent Brewster, and
- Photos Grabber by Yandao.com

== History ==
- March, 2000: Yahoo! Photos launched.
- March 29, 2005: Yahoo bought Flickr, which is an online community to share and discuss personal photos and montages.
- January 14, 2007: Yahoo! Photos updated the site with new features, including free full-resolution downloads from ISPs that have partnerships with Yahoo.
- May 3, 2007: An informal announcement was made that Yahoo! Photo was going to shut down. USA Today reported:

"Yahoo Photos will be shut down by the fall. Users will be directed over a three-month period to transfer their images to Flickr or other photo sites such as Multiply, Shutterfly, Kodak Gallery, Snapfish or Photobucket. Yahoo says it will make the transition easy, with a one-click transfer" process."

- June 2007: Yahoo! photos was no longer accepting new accounts or allowing users to upload photos.
- September 20, 2007: Yahoo! Photos shut down. (October 18 for India users, October 19 for Australian users). Users can still follow a link to transfer their photos to one of five providers automatically: Flickr, Shutterfly, Photobucket, Snapfish, or Kodak Gallery.
- October 18–19, 2007: Yahoo! Photos shut down for Indian and Australian users and all photos and accounts were deleted.

== See also ==
- Image hosting service
- Photo sharing
- Flickr
