= Shorty Awards =

Annual awards show for short-form social web media content

The Shorty Awards
- Current: 17th Shorty Awards
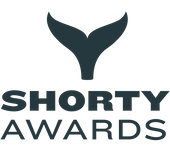
- Awarded for: The best of social media - from creators to brands
- Country: United States
- First award: February 11, 2009; 17 years ago
- Website: shortyawards.com

The Shorty Awards (also known as "The Shortys") are awards for outstanding and innovative work in digital and social media content by brands, advertising agencies, and creators. The awards, which generally focus on short-term content, honor achievements in content creation on Twitter, Facebook, YouTube, Instagram, TikTok, Twitch, and other social networking sites. The Shorty Awards began in 2008 and initially recognized achievements by independent creators on Twitter, with the first formal awards ceremony occurring in February 2009. Since then, the awards, which are now awarded each spring, have shifted their focus to recognize content across numerous platforms.

Entrant work is judged on the merits of excellence in creativity, strategy, and engagement by the Real Timer Academy, a group of industry professionals selected by the Shorty Awards on the basis of their professional reputations, industry knowledge, and personal achievements (which may include previous Shorty wins). An additional public voting component, known as Audience Honor Voting, is also used to select Shorty Awards contenders.

Notable Shorty Award winners include Malala Yousafzai, Trevor Noah, Michelle Obama, Conan O’Brien, Lady Gaga, Bill Nye, Jacob Reed, and Lizzo. Brands and organizations such as Chipotle, Duolingo, Marvel Studios, HBO, Red Bull, Airbnb, Nestle, BMW, UNICEF and the Human Rights Campaign have also been awarded.

The Shorty Awards also produces an annual award program called The Shorty Impact Awards, a competition dedicated to showcasing digital and social media-based projects by brands, agencies, and organizations that seek to make the world a better place.

== List of ceremonies ==
Ceremony	Date	Venue	Host city	Host	Ref.
1st Shorty Awards	February 11, 2009	Galapagos Art Space	New York City	Rick Sanchez	
2nd Shorty Awards	March 3, 2010	The Times Center	New York City	Rick Sanchez	
3rd Shorty Awards	March 28, 2011	The Times Center	New York City	Aasif Mandvi	
4th Shorty Awards	March 27, 2012	The Times Center	New York City	Samantha Bee and Jason Jones	
5th Shorty Awards	April 8, 2013	The Times Center	New York City	Felicia Day	
6th Shorty Awards	April 7, 2014	The Times Center	New York City	Natasha Leggero	
7th Shorty Awards	April 20, 2015	The Times Center	New York City	Rachel Dratch	
8th Shorty Awards	April 11, 2016	The Times Center	New York City	Mamrie Hart	
9th Shorty Awards	April 23, 2017	PlayStation Theater	New York City	Tony Hale	
10th Shorty Awards	April 15, 2018	PlayStation Theater	New York City	Keke Palmer	
11th Shorty Awards	May 5, 2019	PlayStation Theater	New York City	Kathy Griffin	
12th Shorty Awards	May 3, 2020	Virtual event streamed online only		J. B. Smoove	
13th Shorty Awards	May 11-14, 2021	Winners revealed on social media			
14th Shorty Awards	May 10, 2022	Winners announced online			
15th Shorty Awards	May 24, 2023	Tribeca 360°, NYC	New York City	Jay Shetty	
16th Shorty Awards	May 22, 2024	Tribeca 360°, NYC	New York City	Jay Shetty	
17th Shorty Awards	May 21, 2025	Tribeca 360°, NYC	New York City		

== 1st Shorty Awards ==
The awards were created in 2008 by tech entrepreneurs Greg Galant, Adam Varga, and Lee Semel of Sawhorse Media. They invited Twitter account holders to nominate the best Twitter users in general categories such as humor, news, food, and design. Winners were chosen by more than 30,000 Twitter users during the voting period. The founders of Twitter first heard about the awards after the contest had gotten underway and expressed support for it.

The first Shorty Awards ceremony was held on February 11, 2009, at the Galapagos Art Space in Brooklyn, New York. Approximately 300 people attended the event. The event was hosted by CNN anchor Rick Sanchez and featured appearances by prominent Twitter users MC Hammer and Gary Vaynerchuk and a video appearance by Shaquille O'Neal. The awards, in 26 categories, were voted on by Twitter users.

== 2nd Shorty Awards ==
Voting for the second Shorty Awards opened in January 2010 in 26 official categories. A Real-Time Photo of the Year category was added to the list of official categories for the first time, recognizing the best photo posted to services such as Twitpic, Yfrog, or Facebook.

The second Shorty Awards competition introduced a panel of judges called the Real-Time Academy of Short Form Arts & Sciences whose members were Craig Newmark, David Pogue, Kurt Andersen, Caterina Fake, Joi Ito, Frank Moss, Alberto Ibargüen, Sreenath Sreenivasan, MC Hammer, Alyssa Milano and Jimmy Wales. After public nominations determined the finalists, the academy decided on the winners.

Winners were announced at a ceremony held in the Times Center in The New York Times building in Manhattan that was also streamed online. The ceremony was hosted by CNN anchor Rick Sanchez, who presented awards in the official categories as well as the newly added Real-Time Photo of the Year and a special humanitarian award.

== 3rd Shorty Awards ==
The nomination period for the third annual Shorty Awards opened in January 2011 and ran through February 11, 2011, except for new categories that had extended nomination deadlines. There were 30 official categories and five special categories. In addition to Real-Time Photo of the Year, for the first time the awards accepted nominations for Foursquare Mayor of the Year, Foursquare Location of the Year, Microblog of the Year on Tumblr, and a Connecting People award. The awards also introduced new Shorty Industry Awards to recognize the best uses of social media by brands and agencies. Winners were announced at a ceremony on March 28, 2011, hosted by Aasif Mandvi in the Times Center. Other Shorty Awards presenters were scheduled to include Kiefer Sutherland, Jerry Stiller, Anne Meara, Stephen Wallem, Miss USA Rima Fakih, and Miss Teen USA Kamie Crawford.

== 4th Shorty Awards ==
The 4th Annual Shorty Awards featured Ricky Gervais and Tiffani Thiessen. 1.6 million tweeted nominations were made across all the categories to honor the top users on Twitter, Facebook, Tumblr, Foursquare, YouTube and other internet platforms.

== 5th Shorty Awards ==
The 5th Annual Shorty Awards ceremony featured Felicia Day, James Urbaniak, Kristian Nairn, Hannibal Buress, Carrie Keagan, Chris Hardwick, David Karp and Coco Rocha. 2.4 million tweeted nominations were made across all the categories to honor the top users on Twitter, Facebook, Tumblr, Foursquare, YouTube and other internet sites.

== 6th Shorty Awards ==
The ceremony took place on April 7, 2014, at the New York TimesCenter and was hosted by Comedian Natasha Leggero. The show included appearances by Patton Oswalt, Jamie Oliver, Kristen Bell, Jerry Seinfeld, Moshe Kasher, Julie Klausner, Erin Brady, Guy Kawasaki, Matt Walsh, Retta, Us the Duo, Big Boi, Gilbert Gottfried, Thomas Middleditch, Billie Jean King and Leandra Medine. Winners included Jerry Seinfeld and Will Ferrell.

== 7th Shorty Awards ==
The Seventh Annual Shorty Awards was hosted by comedian Rachel Dratch and took place on April 20, 2015, at The Times Center in NYC. The Real-Time Academy, the judging body of the Shortys, tripled in size for the 7th annual Awards and included Alton Brown, Mamrie Hart, Nikki Glaser, OK Go, The Fine Bros, Debbie Sterling, Dan Savage, Deena Varshavskaya and Palmer Luckey. Panic! at the Disco was the musical guest at the ceremony. On-stage presenters included Kevin Jonas, Bill Nye, Bella Thorne, Wyclef Jean, Emily Kinney and Tyler Oakley.

== 8th Shorty Awards ==
The Eighth Annual Shorty Awards were held in NYC at the TimesCenter on April 11, 2016. They were hosted by YouTuber, Writer and Comedian Mamrie Hart with musical performances from Nico & Vinz. Winners of the night included Bill Wurtz, DJ Khaled, Misty Copeland, Casey Neistat, Dwayne Johnson, Hannah Hart, Troye Sivan, Baddie Winkle, Kevin Hart, Taraji P. Henson, King Bach, and Zach King.

== 9th Shorty Awards ==
The Ninth Annual Shorty Awards were held in NYC at the PlayStation Theater on April 23, 2017. They were hosted by two-time Emmy Award winner Tony Hale with a musical performance by Lizzo. Winners of the night included Bill Nye, Shay Mitchell, Doug the Pug, Gigi Gorgeous, Simone Biles, Mara Wilson, Gaten Matarazzo and Chrissy Teigen.

== 10th Shorty Awards ==
The 10th Annual Shorty Awards, took place on April 15, 2018, at the PlayStation Theater, New York City. The ceremony was hosted by actress, singer, and songwriter Keke Palmer with a musical performance by Betty Who.

== 11th Shorty Awards ==
The 11th Annual Shorty Awards were held on May 5, 2019, in New York City at the PlayStation Theater. The ceremony was hosted by American actress and comedian Kathy Griffin, with a musical performance by Tank and the Bangas.

== 12th Shorty Awards ==
The 12th Annual Shorty Awards were held on May 3, 2020. Due to the COVID-19 pandemic, the ceremony took place online for the first time, with presenters and award winners filming from their own homes. The ceremony was hosted by actor J.B. Smoove and featured a remixed performance of Trap Queen by Fetty Wap. Award winners included Jack Stauber, Supercar Blondie, Rose and Rosie, and Greta Thunberg.

== 13th Shorty Awards ==
The 13th Annual Shorty Awards took place from April 26 to May 14, 2021. The ceremony was hosted on different social media platforms, such as Instagram and Clubhouse, to create a more tailored experience. Winners were announced from May 11 to May 14, with 10 winners being revealed each hour from 1 to 4 p.m. EST on the Shorty Awards Instagram account.

== 14th Shorty Awards ==
The 14th Annual Shorty Awards were held virtually on May 15, 2022, honoring the best in social media and digital content. Hosted by Jay Shetty, the event recognized influencers, brands, and organizations across various categories, celebrating excellence in digital storytelling and innovative online campaigns. Notable winners included Tabitha Brown for her food content and the D'Amelio Family for their contributions to family and parenting content. The event highlighted the role of digital media in connecting and inspiring audiences during challenging times.

== 15th Shorty Awards ==
The 15th Annual Shorty Awards celebrated the best in social media and digital content on May 24, 2023, at Tribeca 360° in New York City. Hosted by Jay Pharoah, the event honored creators, brands, and organizations across 148 categories, recognizing excellence in digital storytelling, innovative content, and impactful social media campaigns. Notable winners included Jay Shetty, Smile Train, and Paramount. The event also introduced the Elevate Creatives Fund, a $100,000 initiative aimed at supporting digital creators in building sustainable businesses.

== See also ==
- iHeartRadio Podcast Awards
- The Streamer Awards
- Streamy Awards
- Webby Awards
- List of web awards
