= ImageShack =

American image hosting website

- Screenshot ImageShack start page
- Website type: Image hosting service
- Available in: English, Russian
- Owner: ImageShack Corp.
- Creator: Alexander Levin
- Website: imageshack.us
- Commercial: Yes
- Registration: Optional (required for uploading files)
- Launched: November 12, 2003; 23 years ago
- Current status: Active

ImageShack is a subscription-based image hosting website headquartered at Los Gatos, California.

Although ImageShack always had a subscription service, the majority of its revenue was originally produced from advertising related to its free image hosting. In January 2014, ImageShack announced that it was switching to a subscription based service and would no longer offer free uploads.

Images stored in free accounts were still available until January 31, 2016, and free accounts not converted to paid accounts were deleted after that date. The new website interface does not allow direct free web-based access to the original image resolution, but images can be bulk-downloaded at original resolution using their SkyPath application.

== Image hosting ==
The site was launched in November 2003. The main page has a file selection field, where the user may select the image file to upload. The image file format must be either JPEG (JPG), PNG, GIF, TIFF (TIF), or BMP, and the file must be smaller than or equal to 5 megabytes (free service) or 10 megabytes (subscription service). Uploaded BMP and TIFF (TIF) images are automatically converted to PNG format.

After the file is uploaded, the user is redirected to a page containing different versions of URLs to the uploaded image. These URLs are preformatted in a variety of HTML and Bulletin Board code snippets, which can be used to hotlink them on websites and message boards. These URLs are not listed publicly, so only the user and the people to whom the user shares the URL know the file location.

In mid-2008, ImageShack began "hiding" the direct link to images in an attempt to reduce the number of directly linked images since they provide no advertising revenue. After receiving feedback from users, Imageshack discontinued "hiding" the direct links and placed them on the top of the page. However, it now claims, you must register to see the direct link (viewing the image directly or reading the URL from the source code also works).

Images are stored on ImageShack indefinitely unless the image or the user who uploaded it abuses the Terms of Service. The image will be rendered inaccessible if the image uses over 200 megabytes of bandwidth in a one-hour period. If the image in question is not accessed a single time in one year, it is removed.

There is also a free registration service that gives the user the ability to see and delete their previously uploaded images.

In May 2006, it was reported that ImageShack serves 100,000 concurrent user requests during peak operation.

ImageShack also provides a standalone open-source application for users to upload images and videos. The ImageShack uploader is available for Windows, Mac, and Linux.

In the past, users were able to upload images anonymously, without an account. As of November 7, 2013, ImageShack stopped accepting image uploads from anonymous users, so users who had signed up would have to log in or register to upload images.

On January 17, 2014, ImageShack announced the change of its business model, which was moved from an advertising-based model to a subscription-based model. This change now allows only premium users to upload images.

In August 2015, ImageShack silently started replacing deleted embedded images with advertising, littering many internet forums with advertising banners. The company announced in November 2015 that free accounts would be discontinued on January 31, 2016, if they were not upgraded.

== Torrent service ==
ImageShack's torrent service, also known as Torrent Drive or ImageShack Drive, offered server side torrent downloads through a web-based interface. Torrents were downloaded by ImageShack servers and kept for 30 days. Once finished, an HTTP download link was provided. It was provided for non-paying registered users, but limited to a quota that all such users combined can download, measured by the amount of use of the servers by paying users. As of 28 October 2009, ImageShack stopped the free service for Torrent Drive and has since stopped the service altogether.

== yfrog ==
Yfrog was a service run by ImageShack designed specifically for uploading photographs and videos to Twitter. It was launched in February 2009 and allowed uploads via email or a website interface.

== See also ==
- Photo sharing
- List of photo sharing websites
