= Fotki =

Image-sharing website

- Website type: photo/ video sharing and media networking
- Available in: English; Brazilian Portuguese; Russian; Chinese (simplified); German; French; Italian; Estonian; Lithuanian; Latvian; Dutch; Polish; Malay; Hebrew; Spanish; Japanese
- Owners: Fotki, Inc
- Creators: Fotki, Inc
- Website: Fotki.com
- Commercial: Yes
- Launched: 1998; 28 years ago
- Current status: Active

Fotki is a digital photo sharing, video sharing and media social network website and web service suite; it is one of the world's largest social networking sites. As an image hosting service, Fotki licenses photo-sharing software for global companies such as Telecom Italia, Alice.it, Sears, Mark Travel, Vegas.com, and Funjet.com, among others.

As of January 2011, Fotki claimed to have over 1 million 600 thousand registered members from 241 countries and hosted over a billion digital images. It has been ranked in the 1400s in popularity by Alexa.

Originally offering free accounts, Fotki ceased offering free accounts in 2015.

== History ==
=== Founding as freeware ===
Fotki was founded in 1998 by Katrin Lilleoks and Dmitri Don (who became President) to store and share photos and communicate with others around the world. The name is derived from colloquial terms for photography in several Slavic languages. It was initially used heavily in Estonia, Latvia, Lithuania, and Russia, later becoming registered in the United States.

In 2001, the commercial version was launched. In 2003, Fotki became a registered trademark in the United States.

In 2007, Fotki.com was recognized by CNET as one of the best Web 2.0 applications. In 2008, founder Dmitri Don described it as a photo-sharing, photo-printing, photo-selling and blogging website. Daily figures, according to Don, included half a million unique daily visitors. The company remained based in Tallinn, with annual turnover of over $50 billion on its licensed or hosted services. Pavel Merdin oversaw the development team. In 2008, Fotki moved its office in the United States from New York to California. Telecom Italia and Alice.it both had web portals using the Fotki photo engine.

In 2011, Fotki stated it had over a million users and a billion images, and was registered in the United States. Features also included printing services, e-commerce photo sales with Fotki taking a 15% commission, and "guestbook facilities". In 2011, a free account had 50 MB of storage, with another 10 MB added monthly.

=== Paid service ===
In June 2012, paid members with 5-year unlimited storage accounts received message that they no longer have access to the original images unless they paid extra fees. In August 2015, all free members received a message to upgrade to a paid service. Fotki stated they could no longer support free members since they were doing away with ads. On October 1, 2015, all free member accounts were deleted.

In June 2018, an email from fotki.com to one of the members stated "In order to keep quality of our service we remove old unused accounts. We've noticed that you didn't use your account at fotki.com for a year. That's why your account is queued to be deleted in 2 days". There is no option to reactivate account without paying for the service.

== Features ==
=== Sharing ===
The primary purpose of the site, in 2002, was to allow and facilitate the process of sharing digital photos online. To that end, users can transfer an image file from a local device to Fotki's server using a variety of tools, where the file can be stored and downloaded by other users.

=== Access ===
By default, all content created in the "Public Home" is available to all viewers. No registration is required to access the public content. To restrict access to their content, Fotki users can use several security options, such as passwords for albums and folders, hidden albums, private section, shared folders, protection from right-click copying, restriction to view originals and to order prints. Fotki also allows for XML-based RSS and Atom feeds, as well as external linking and sending invites to view content.

=== Customization options ===
Users can customize the look of their Fotki site by using different pre-designed skins or manually selecting colors for each element on their page.

=== Community features ===
The site by 2011 had been recognized by CNET as a Web 2.0 social networking application, as it also includes forums, blogs, and contests beyond photo and video sharing.

Beyond photo search, as of 2011, there were also features to search for other members by a number of criteria such as interests. Members can be searched by name, profile type, location, gender, age, interest, marital status and more. IPTC keyword searching is supported.

Fotki runs photo contests on a regular basis. Participation is open to all registered members. Usually, first 3 winners receive a one-year Premium membership, but sometimes there may be other prizes involved if the contest is sponsored by a third party. Effective May 11, 2007, Fotki runs a weekly "My Photo Of The Week" contest.

=== Printing ===
As of 2011, Fotki.com offered printing services which included (as of 2006) digital photo prints, postcards, photo mugs, T-shirts, magnets, mouse-pads and photo frames at competitive prices.

== Localization ==
As of January 2011, the site was partially translated to Russian, German, French, Spanish, Italian, Chinese Simplified, Japanese, Polish, Dutch, Turkish, Brazilian Portuguese, Estonian, Icelandic, Latvian, Lithuanian, Malay, Ukrainian and Hebrew. With volunteer help, Fotki continues to translate its pages and improve the existing translation. Volunteers are given Premium memberships for contributing.

== Criticism ==
Fotki has been mostly criticized for not providing enough storage space to its Free members, problems with hotlinking, no month-to-month membership, and traffic limit. In addition, Fotki show ads on albums of paid Premium members.

=== Controversies and discussions ===
==== Censorship and artistic nudity ====
In May 2006, a photo of a nearly-nude female was removed from a Fotki contest by the moderators. This initiated a prolonged discussion on "artistic nudity". The author of the disqualified entry criticized Fotki for censorship and questioned its policy on nudity. After exchanging arguments, the Fotki side agreed to review the site's policy in favor of artistic photography while the decision to prohibit adult content in public sections of the site was upheld. As a result, the Fotki administration decided to run a separate, non-public photo contest once a month in which nudity is allowed.

==== Contest rules ====
In October 2006, several Fotki members posted messages in the Fotki blog protesting against the then-current contest rules which apparently allowed the earlier entrants to receive more exposure and thus get more votes. Other major issues brought up by the users included maintaining anonymity of entries while voting is in progress, allowing non-paying members to participate, working out a better formula for calculating the scores, allowing image editing and enhancement. A heated discussion that involved many Fotki members quickly gave rise to a vigorous campaign to make the administration change the contest rules. As a result, a new contest system was introduced and new rules developed.

==== Updated storage policy ====
Fotki sent out a message in June 2012 to all of its subscribers, notifying them of its financial situation and the resulting need for extra support for the storage of the original full-sized images. Access to the original images was suspended until further arrangements were made. In August 2015, all free members received a message to upgrade to a paid service. Fotki stated they could no longer support free members since they were doing away with ads and on October 1, 2015 all free members accounts would be deleted. All free members had to upgrade to a paid service or face their accounts to be deleted on October 1, 2015.

== See also ==
- List of image-sharing websites
- List of social networking services
- List of virtual communities with more than 1 million users
