= Trovebox =

Former photography sharing platform

- Website type: Image Hosting Service
- Headquarters: {{{location_country}}}
- Founders: Jaisen Mathai and Patrick Santana
- Website: trovebox.com
- Commercial: Yes
- Registration: Not required for viewing
- Launched: 2011
- Current status: Acquired

Trovebox was a for-profit open source digital photography sharing and management platform. The site was acquired in July, 2014 and the hosted service was shut down on March 31, 2015.

== History ==
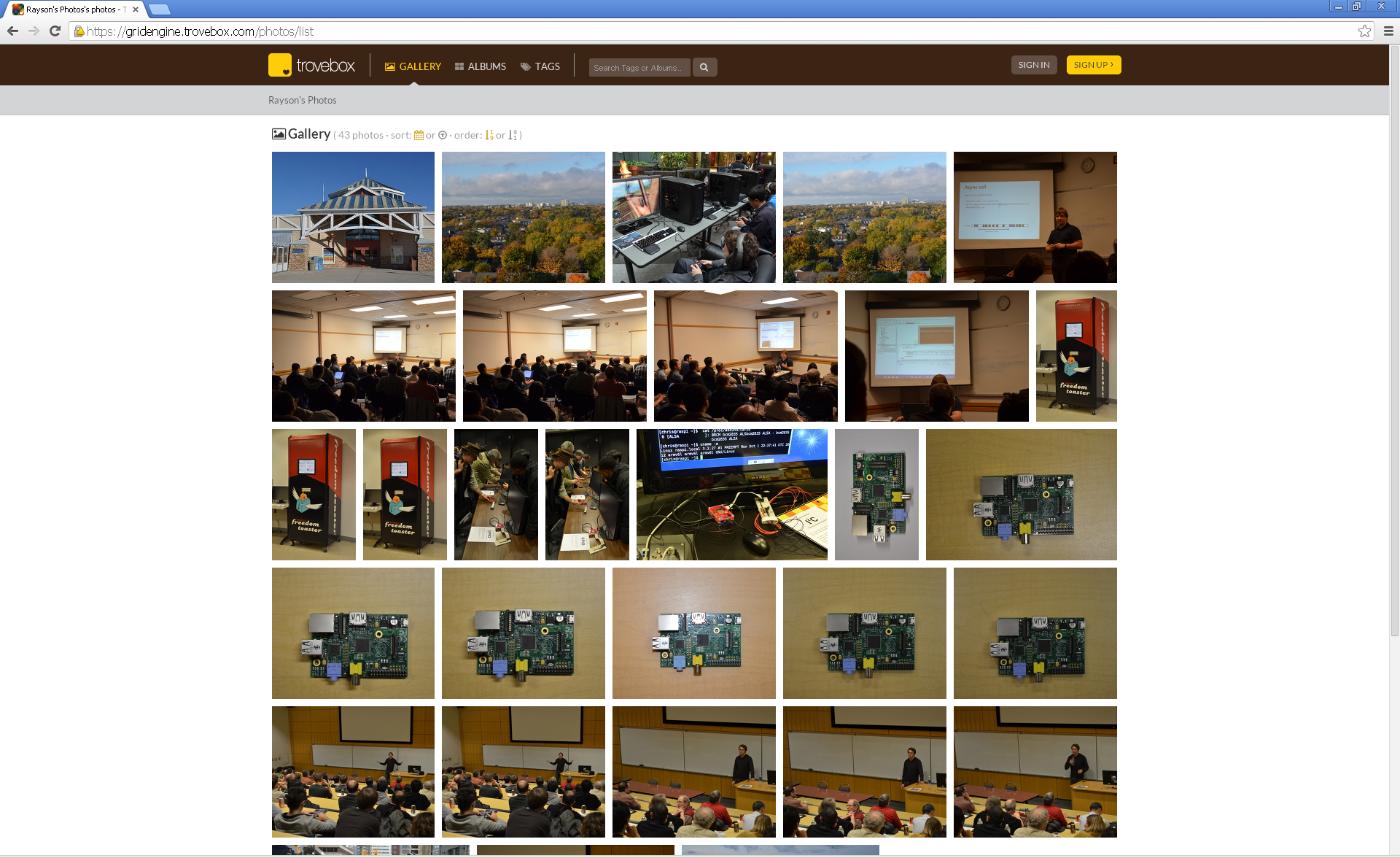
A Trovebox user's homepage

Trovebox was initially started by Jaisen Mathai and Patrick Santana as a Kickstarter project and launched in December 2011. Trovebox was originally known as OpenPhoto until being rebranded in January 2013.

Trovebox received funding from the Shuttleworth Foundation.

The site was acquired by Western Digital in July, 2014 to be integrated into the My Cloud product line.

As part of the acquisition, the company announced on January 16, 2015 that they would be shutting down the hosted service on March 31, 2015.

== Features ==
Trovebox consisted of a platform API, web application, iOS application and Android application. A unique feature of Trovebox was the ability to connect to various cloud storage services including Dropbox, Box, Amazon S3, Dreamhost Dreamobjects and Trovebox's own storage.

Trovebox users could import their media libraries from online services like Flickr and Smugmug.

Trovebox's server-side, Android app, and iOS client source code is available on GitHub under the Apache open source license for users who prefer to install Trovebox themselves.
