= Alan Schaaf =

American businessman

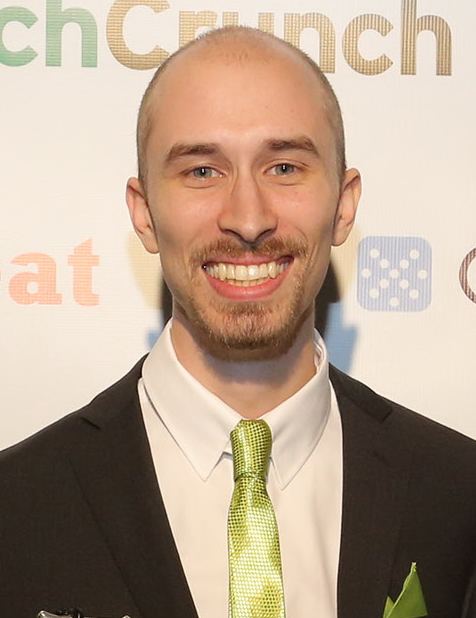
- Schaaf at The 7th Annual Crunchies Awards 2014 in San Francisco
- Born: October 21, 1987 (age 38); Granville, Ohio
- Other name: MrGrim
- Education: Ohio University
- Years active: 2009–2022
- Known for: Founder of Imgur

Alan Schaaf (born October 21, 1987), also known as MrGrim, is an American entrepreneur. He is best known as the founder and former CEO of the image sharing app and website Imgur - an image sharing website.

== Early life ==
Schaaf was born in Granville, Ohio. He attended Ohio University and received a bachelor's degree in computer science.

== Career ==
Schaaf founded Imgur when he was an undergraduate at Ohio University in 2009. Imgur started as a simple image-sharing website and evolved into the largest image-sharing community in the world with more than 150 million monthly active users in 2015. Under Schaaf's leadership, Imgur was bootstrapped and profitable for five years, scaling organically to millions of users before receiving $40 million in investment from Andreessen Horowitz in 2014.

In 2015 Schaaf was listed as one of Forbes 30 Under 30.
