= World's Biggest Coffee Morning =

Annual fund-raising event

Macmillan Coffee Morning
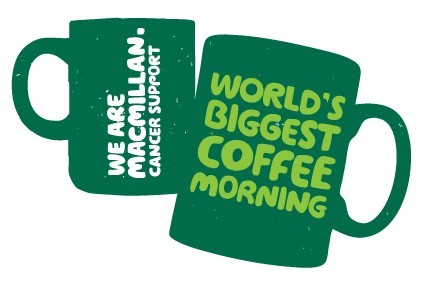
- Founded: 1990
- Type: Charity
- Website: www.macmillan.org.uk/coffee-morning

Macmillan Coffee Morning (formerly World's Biggest Coffee Morning) is an annual fundraising event run by Macmillan Cancer Support where people across the UK host and attend Coffee Mornings in aid of Macmillan. Since 1990 it has raised over £310 million for Macmillan. Events are often held on the last Friday of September; however, similar gatherings can take place at various times throughout the year.

In 2024, Macmillan's flagship fundraising event Macmillan Coffee Morning raised £17.1 million, with more than 52,000 people hosting a Coffee Morning.

== History ==
The first Coffee Morning was held in 1990, when a local fundraising committee held a coffee morning where the cost of the coffee was donated to Macmillan. The first nationwide Coffee Morning took place in 1991 with 2,600 supporters taking part. The World's Biggest Coffee Morning is one of the largest and longest-standing fundraising events of its kind in the United Kingdom. As well as traditional Coffee Morning events, over the years supporters have held kitchen disco-themed fundraisers, chai afternoon teas, and pet-friendly events. Other fundraising events have included Coffee Mornings 100 feet underground at Poldark Mine, a Coffee Morning held at The Shard in London, on a jet fighter, and in Antarctica.

== Corporate supporters ==
Since it was established, Macmillan Coffee Morning has worked with various corporate partners as part of its fundraising efforts:

- M&S Café: Since 2010, M&S Café has raised over £25 million for Macmillan.
- Welcome Break: For Coffee Morning 2025, Welcome Break donated £180,000 worth of free marketing space to promote the event.
- First Bus: For Coffee Morning 2025, First Bus donated free advertising space.
- JustGiving: During the 2025 Coffee Morning, JustGiving hosted a free prize draw for Coffee Morning hosts.

== Notable participants ==
- Alesha Dixon, English singer-songwriter, dancer, model, and television personality
- Larry Lamb, English actor
- Mrs Stephen Fry, blogger, author and award-winning Tweeter (and fictional ‘poor, downtrodden wife & mother of his [Stephen Fry’s] five, six or possibly seven kids.")
- Martin Clunes, English actor and comedian.
- Ben Fogle, English television presenter, adventurer and writer.
- Katherine Jenkins, Welsh classical singer - attended Marks and Spencer coffee morning with executive chairman Stuart Rose.
- Sheree Murphy, English actress and television presenter.

== See also ==
- Cancer in the United Kingdom
