= Album II =

Album II or Album 2 may refer to:

- Album2, photo sharing website
- Album II (Loudon Wainwright III album)
- Album II (Kem album)
