= Zooomr =

Former website for sharing digital photos

- Website type: Photo sharing
- Owner: BlueBridge Technologies Group
- Creators: Kristopher Tate & Michael Van Veen
- Website: https://www.zooomr.com
- Commercial: Yes
- Registration: Free
- Current status: defunct

Zooomr was a website for sharing digital photos.

== History ==
Zooomr was created in 2005 by Kristopher Tate and Michael Van Veen of BlueBridge Technologies Group.

On 19 June 2006 Thomas Hawk, a photographer and blogger from San Francisco, was recruited by Zooomr as its so called "Chief Evangelist." On 17 July 2006 Zooomr released Zooomr 2 which introduced SmartSets, improved geotagging of photos via TagMap, and many enhancements in speed, design and performance. Features such as Notes and Portals were added to Zooomr on 22 August 2006.

In 2012, the web site was updated for Zoomr's 7th anniversary, announcing an "official closed beta" of a new version of the site that would discard "older concepts that kept the previous version of Zooomr too technically deep from every day users". As of 1 March 2015, there has been no further visible update to the site.

As of August 2022, Zooomr now directs to an online gemstone store.

== See also ==
- Image hosting service
- Photo sharing
