= BayImg =

Image hosting website

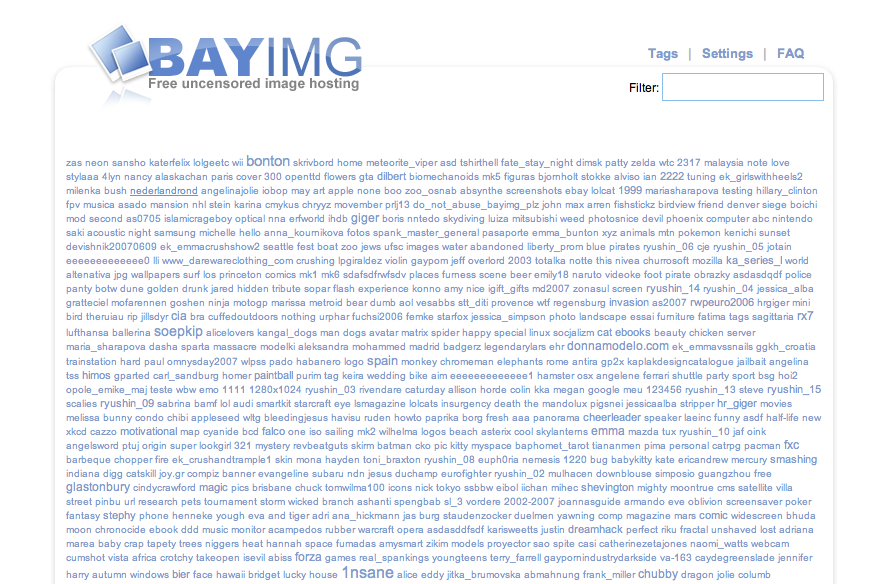
- BayImg front page
- Website type: Image Hosting Service
- Owner: The Pirate Bay
- Creator: The Pirate Bay
- Website: bayimg.com
- Commercial: Ad supported
- Registration: None
- Launched: 2007
- Current status: Online
- Written in: PHP

BayImg is an image hosting website founded in 2007 by The Pirate Bay, and pulled offline after a TPB server was compromised in 2014. BayImg provided a no-registration service that did not have any copyright license enforced on its images.

== Overview ==
BayImg had a 100 MB file limit and supported over 140 different file formats. Uploaded images were automatically converted to JPEG format. It used tag clouds to browse images and supports removal codes for images. The website aimed to host all images that are legal but reserved the right to remove images due to technical reasons.

Anyone could upload and remain fully anonymous, making it harder to track down which user uploaded a certain image. It had been criticised for the 'unnecessary' use of JavaScript to load images.

We do not censor [the images]. We believe in freedom of speech, it's of utter importance to us. As long as your pictures are legal they will be hosted here, but we reserve the right to remove images due to technical reasons though.

Well, we really think it is a big deal [to host uncensored images]. Freedom of speech is our foundation. And it doesn't come cheap. You might have heard that old quote by Evelyn Beatrice Hall; "I disapprove of what you say, but I will defend to the death your right to say it." It's really that simple. There are a lot of ugly opinions out there, but democracy ain't worth much without the right to express those opinions. There is this myth about freedom of speech being a nice comfortable idea, well it's not. It's annoying, appalling and sometimes even dangerous. But the opposite is way worse.

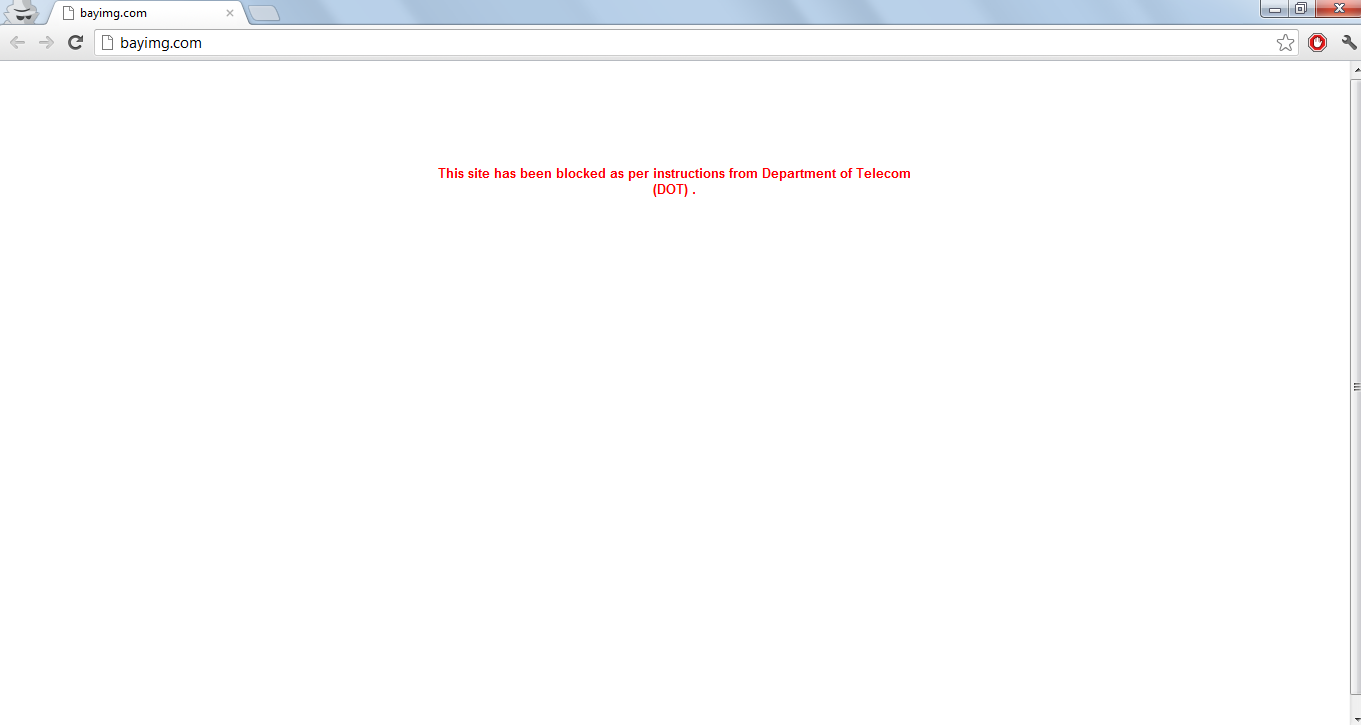
Bayimg.com blocked by orders of Department of Telecom on BSNL broadband network in India

By the word "legal", BayImg meant legal under Swedish law.

Pre-publication images from GQ, Vogue, Teen Vogue and Lucky, posted to BayImg, became part of a legal battle when Conde Nast's servers were illegally accessed and links to the images were posted on a fashion blog. The blogger was IP-traced, raided by the FBI, and settled with Conde Nast.
