= Heello =

Online social networking service

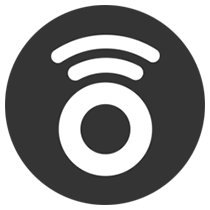

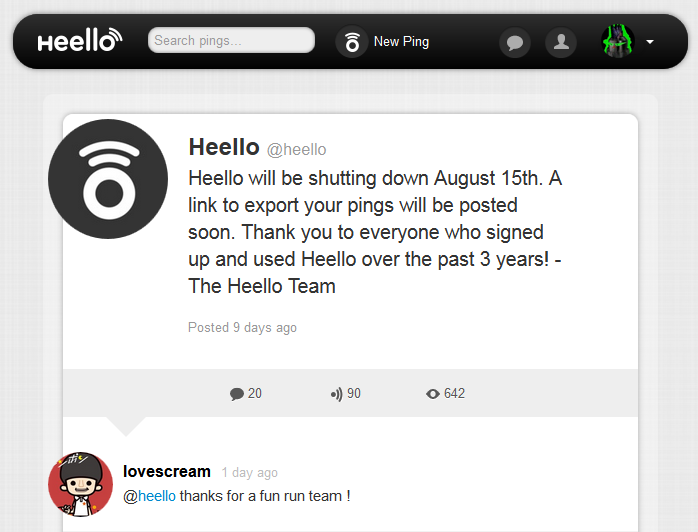
- Screenshot Screenshot announcing the shutdown of the site
- Owner: Heello Inc.
- Founder: Noah Everett
- Launched: 10 August 2011; 15 years ago
- Current status: Defunct (August 15, 2014)
- Native clients on: iOS, Android

Heello was an online social networking and microblogging service launched on August 10, 2011. It was based on 140-character posts, called Pings, to which users could attach pictures and videos.

Heello was widely released by Noah Everett, the founder of TwitPic, one day after Twitter rolled out its official in-app photo sharing. Everett said Heello would be financed by revenue that TwitPic generated through online advertising.

In its first day, Heello reported averaging about 4 Pings per second. Everett said that Heello had reached 1 million Pings in its first two days.

On August 8, 2012, the Heello team announced via Twitter that they were working on a new version of the website, and mentioned the development of mobile applications for the iPhone and Android platforms.

A post on the Heello blog stated that the new version's main features would be:

- a simple user interface that focused on the user's timeline
- inline photos and videos in timelines
- native check-in functionality backed by a global database of over 58 million places
- a big focus on their developer ecosystem
- users would own their data

The old Heello website was shut down in November 2012.

On January 12, 2013, Heello launched a beta version of its new website. The beta included Private Pings, header photos (similar to those of Facebook or Twitter), and a cleaner design.

The Heello API was released in January 2013. The official Heello for Android app was launched in August 2013, and the iOS app followed in September.

On June 23, 2014, the Heello team announced that Heello would be shutting down on August 15, 2014. A link was provided to request an archive of user data. Everett said there had been "a lot of interest" in a developer-friendly alternative to Twitter, but "people wanted to stay where their friends were."

It was unofficially recreated in Russia after 2014.
