= Fotopic =

Defunct photo sharing website

Fotopic.net was a photo sharing website and web services suite operating between 2001 and 2011.

== History ==
On 2 August 1999, the website named photos.jml.net began as a private collection of photographs of a British couple, Joel and Nicky Rowbottom, and by February 2001, the system was transferred to fotopic.net and made available to the public. It was a particularly popular amongst early adopters of photo sharing technology, featuring in press coverage of this trend, and popular throughout the transport enthusiast community, particularly with those involved with railway restoration projects.

In May 2008, Fotopic.net was acquired by Snappy Designs Ltd, a group of private investment individuals in partnership with ANY-Web Group.Services

Fotopic.net offered a free account or premium services that added various features. The free account consisted of disk space (250 megabytes) for photos that could be uploaded through the web browser, ftp or email. Free accounts became dormant if the user did not log in every six months. Account holders could create albums that were viewable by unregistered users.

== Closure ==
Around 8 March 2011, Fotopic.net's servers were taken off-line. On 31 March 2011 it was announced that Snappy Designs Ltd had been placed into administration, leaving the future of the site contents uncertain.

On 19 April 2011, the home page of Fotopic.net went live again with a message informing users that "Fotopic and its parent company Snappy Designs Ltd are no longer trading". It also informed users that all images uploaded onto Fotopic servers were safe and that their aim was to migrate photos to a new service "with similar or better functionality than Fotopic and a method for users to export their existing images".

== Retrieval made available ==
In October 2012, the "Fotopic Legacy Team" released a statement which said that former users would be able to retrieve their images from the site, and by 11 February 2013, all photographs were released for users to retrieve their images. It was also announced on that date that free access to the fotopic site would be deactivated on 28 February. After that a charge would be made for accessing individual photo libraries. Because of problems downloading some pictures located on one of the servers, the deadline was extended to 20 March.

However, users retrieving large image galleries were crashing the servers and the Team was having to pay its developer to deal with the problems, so access became restricted to particular groups of users. Access was then progressively extended to previously excluded users. The deadline for free access was also extended a couple of times.
