= Starmatic =

Photo sharing and filtering app

Starmatic S.A.
- Website type: Photo sharing
- Available in: English, French
- Headquarters: Paris, France
- Area served: Worldwide
- Website: www.starmatic.com
- Registration: Optional
- Launched: September 2012
- Current status: Discontinued

Starmatic was a social networking-enabled photo sharing and filtering application for the Apple iPhone, launched in September 2012.

== History ==
Starmatic made its debut on the Apple App Store on September 5, 2012, gained almost 500,000 users, and was discontinued in May 2014.

== Backstory ==
The Starmatic application was named after the Starmatic Brownie camera introduced by Eastman Kodak in 1959. Starmatic was part of Kodak's Brownies Star series launched in 1957. Made of plastic and relatively cheap, Starmatic fell in the category of toy cameras and sold over an estimated 10 million units in 5 years.

The icon and the camera of the application were modeled after the original Starmatic camera, while the two rolls of filters, Starmacolor and Starmachrome, were inspired by the 127 films used by Starmatic cameras.

== Reception ==
Starmatic made Apple's Top 25 New and Noteworthy iPhone apps in 20 countries (including USA, China, Japan, Italy and France) and gained over 50,000 registered users from around the world within a month.

Starmatic was named an App of the Week by Stuff magazine, The Guardian, and AppMyWorld. The app was praised for its interface and was perceived by the media as a serious alternative to Instagram.

Nicholas Carron, in a review of the app for We Are Juxt, stated:

Upon opening the app for the first time, there is an immediate sense that the Starmatic team not only understood the niche benefits of reviving a legendary brand, they utilized their various backgrounds in design, fashion, photography, advertising and previous business pursuits to create a handheld, interactive product that is visually appealing and tempts exploration.

Starmatic was also recommended via Twitter by the Apple App Store and by British actor Stephen Fry to his 5 million followers.
