= Yfrog =

Defunct online image hosting service

yfrog
- Website type: Image sharing
- Available in: English
- Dissolved: 2015
- Registration: Required
- Launched: February 2009; 17 years ago
- Current status: Defunct

yfrog is a defunct image hosting service formerly run by ImageShack. It commenced operations in February 2009 and shut down in 2015. The service was designed primarily to allow users to share their photographs and videos as links on the Twitter microblogging platform.

== History and features ==
Yfrog was launched in February 2009. The name yfrog was based on "yellow frog", which is the logo of ImageShack. The original yfrog logo featured a yellow frog, but in May 2011 was changed to a circle of six speech balloons in different colors.

Images and videos were uploaded to yfrog via the website interface, or by email. The URLs of yfrog links were shorter than on ImageShack (e.g. http://yfrog.com/1upend), in order to fit within the 140 characters limit of a tweet. The yfrog website was optimized for mobile viewing, and aimed to capture a market similar to TwitPic's. As of October 2010, 25 applications supported the yfrog upload API, including the official Twitter for iPhone app, TweetDeck, Seesmic, Twitterrific, and Twittelator.

Yfrog had approximately 29% of the Twitter photo sharing market in 2011.

In summer 2011, Twitter began hosting its own images natively through its web and mobile interfaces, which caused usage to go down. Yfrog pivoted to run its own social media service, Yfrog Social, in 2012. Yfrog Social shut down in 2015, while Yfrog for Twitter also redirected to ImageShack and replaced former images with unrelated ads.

== See also ==
- Flickr
- Photobucket
- TinyPic
