= SmugMug =

Paid image sharing, image hosting service, and online video platform

SmugMug, Inc.
- Website type: Image hosting service
- Headquarters: Mountain View, California, {{{location_country}}}
- Owners: Awes.me, Inc
- Key people: Don MacAskill (CEO); Ben MacAskill (COO)
- Employees: 210
- Subsidiaries: Flickr
- Website: smugmug.com
- Commercial: Yes
- Registration: Not required for viewing
- Launched: November 3, 2002; 23 years ago
- Current status: Active

SmugMug is a paid image sharing, image hosting service, and online video platform on which users can upload photos and videos. The company also facilitates the sale of digital and print media for amateur and professional photographers. In 2018, SmugMug purchased Flickr.

== History ==
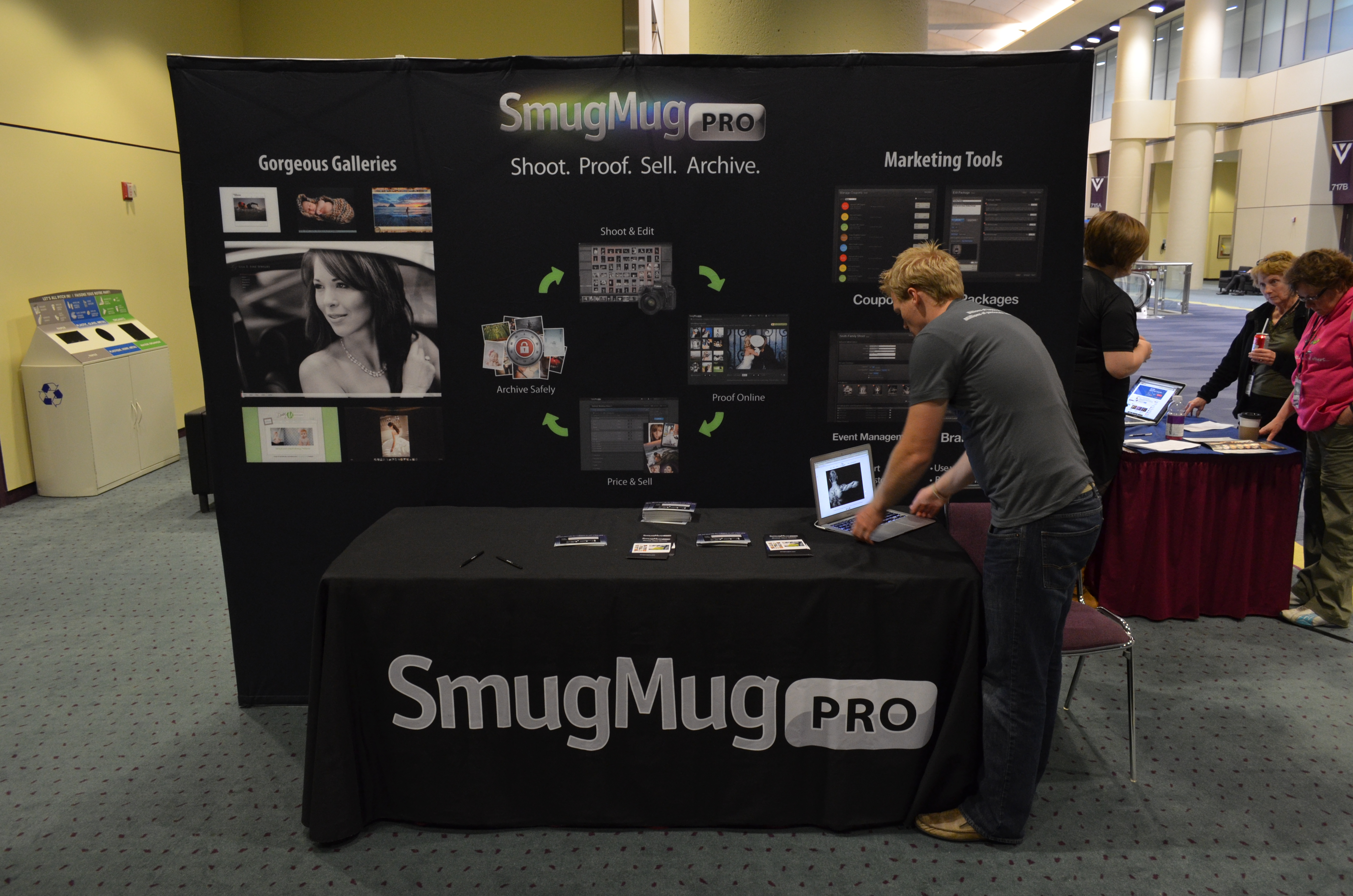
SmugMug conference booth

SmugMug was founded by son and father team Don and Chris MacAskill and launched on November 3, 2002.

The company was started without any venture capital funding, and for a time was run out of the MacAskill family home. In a 2007 article, the Los Angeles Times wrote:

They started on a shoestring budget in 2002, not moving into real offices in Mountain View, Calif., until April. Before that, the MacAskills and their employees set up shop in the five-bedroom home of Chris and his wife, Toni. Engineers bunked two to a bedroom. Blow dryers and vacuums routinely blew circuit breakers. Barking yellow Labrador retrievers chased tennis balls up and down the stairs.

In 2010, two petabytes of photos were stored on the Amazon S3 service.

On April 20, 2018, SmugMug acquired Flickr from Yahoo (while it was briefly known as Oath). SmugMug and Flickr are certified benefit corporations committed to preserving photographic history.

== Features ==
SmugMug offers three different account levels, each with a different subset of features.

== Privacy and security ==
SmugMug has options to allow control over the privacy and security of published photos. It has support for both account-level and gallery-level passwords, as well as hidden galleries.

There is also a friends and family social networking service for members of the service to use, which allows for sharing of photos only to people known to the publisher.

== Professional services ==
In conjunction with its print service, SmugMug has a service aimed at professional photographers. Professional accounts have the ability to add custom digital watermarkings to their photos. They can also sell prints and digital downloads of their photos through the SmugMug interface with their own pricing.

== See also ==
- Image hosting service
- Image sharing
- List of image-sharing websites
