= Mocmex =

Computer virus found on digital photo frames

Mocmex is a trojan, which was found in a digital photo frame in February 2008. It was the first serious computer virus on a digital photo frame. The virus was traced back to a group in China.

== Overview ==
Mocmex collects passwords for online games. The virus is able to recognize and block antivirus protection from more than a hundred security companies and the Windows built-in firewall. Mocmex downloads files from remote locations and hides randomly named files on infected computers. Therefore, the virus is difficult to remove. Furthermore, it spreads to other portable storage devices that were plugged into an infected computer. Industry experts describe the writers of the Trojan Horse as professionals and describe Mocmex as a "nuclear bomb of malware".

== Protection ==
Though Mocmex can be described as a serious virus, protection is not hard. First of all, updated antivirus programs will recognize Mocmex' signature and quarantine it. Another precaution is to check a digital photo frame for malware on a Macintosh or Linux machine before plugging it into a computer with Windows, or disable autorun on Windows.

== Effects ==
A large part of digital photo frames were manufactured in China, particularly in Shenzhen. Mocmex had happened just a few months after quality issues with toys manufactured in China raised the attention of Western countries, leading to a low quality image for Chinese products.
