= Paysite =

Pornographic website requiring a paid subscription

A paysite or pay site, in the adult entertainment industry, is a website that charges money to become a member and view its content, and often produces original adult content. They can be contrasted with "free-sites", which do not charge a membership fee. Most paysites offer "free tours" which allow non-members to view a limited number of short trailers. The vast majority of paysite memberships are bought by men. Some of the earliest paysites began by scanning images from pornographic magazines.

Because there is free porn available on the Internet (e.g. in the form of thumbnail gallery post (TGP) and streaming video sites, as well as piracy), and some individuals cannot afford to or do not wish to purchase paysite memberships or to give their personal and credit card information to such sites, some consumers of pornography view only free pornography. However, paysites are often one of the main originators of new content; they are one way an administrator can pay for the bandwidth costs and they are one of the most conspicuous ways in the industry to try to turn a profit. Theoretically, the more revenue a site takes in, the higher quality content it can produce.

Payment methods include credit card or checking account billing. Bills routinely appear on statements as transactions under the name of a billing entity with a neutral-sounding company name (ostensibly for discretionary reasons) and may not be readily recognized as paysite billing transactions upon casual perusal of bank statements.

Most paysites prevent unauthorized access to their members area by means of a username and password.

A problem that paysites have is copyright protection, even with well-secured sites: there are cases of so-called "site rips", i.e. sites are either hacked, or subscribers redistributed content from a members' area without authorization; there have thus been sightings of original content on other TGP sites or entire site rip archives on file sharing networks. Some sites sell site rips of paysites. Administrators may try to counter these problems by employing digital rights management technologies.

Because members must confirm some details of their identity when they make their payment, a touted advantage of paysites is the potential to keep minors from viewing their content, which, in several jurisdictions, including the United States, is illegal. The issue of how to protect these Internet audiences from pornographic material deemed harmful to them has been widely debated in the U.S. in light of the 1998 federal Child Online Protection Act, although websites hosted in the United States are required by law to publish contact information for the custodian of records.

Many paysites attract potential paying customers by providing a portion of their content for free via free hosted galleries (FHGs), and use an affiliate program to drive new traffic to those FHGs. The percentage of unique visitors to FHGs who become paying members is known as the conversion ratio.

With the rapid increase in paysites and free pornography, the pricing of many paysites has dropped in recent years to increase subscriptions. This has seen the rise of discount sites that offer reduced price memberships to a variety of paysites. Paysites have also increased the quality of their content to attract memberships, with many now offering 4K videos to their members.

== See also ==
- Paywall
- TV Everywhere
- Video on demand
