= Radar.net =

File hosting/sharing site

Radar.net was a photo sharing website and application that allowed users to share pictures and videos. Only those people chosen by the user could view the uploaded content. It was targeted at people who used mobile phones with cameras to take pictures. Radar shut down on May 26, 2010 at noon (PDT).
