= Nice (app) =

Chinese photo-sharing mobile app

Nice is a photo-sharing mobile app developed by Nice App Mobile Technology Co., Ltd. (Chinese: 北京极赞科技有限公司) in China. The app allows users to tag specific locations on images, enabling detailed labeling of items such as clothing and accessories.

The company received a $36 million investment in C-round funding in 2014.

Nice had 30 million registered users and 12 million active users as of late 2015.

As of January 2024, it remained a popular app, the 6th most-downloaded in the iOS App Store for China.

== Official website ==
- Official website
