= Free hosted gallery =

Type of free web content, usually pornography

A free hosted gallery (FHG) is a web page of sample content (usually pornography) which is provided at no charge to affiliates of subscription websites (paysites). Affiliates promote these galleries to web surfers in order to drive web traffic to the paysite; every subscription sold generates a commission for the affiliate. The FHGs are usually hosted by the paysite and employ a simple URL-based system to distinguish between affiliates, so that commissions will be paid to the right party.

Affiliates typically use FHGs to populate their own fake thumbnail gallery post (TGP) websites. It is difficult to get FHGs listed with true TGPs, since many affiliates will attempt to do this and most TGPs reject duplicate listings.

Furthermore, most TGPs require reciprocal links to them on galleries. Since most providers of free hosted galleries don't provide a way of doing so, attempting to submit them to most TGPs is usually futile.

This opens the question of usefulness in regards to free hosted galleries since they can only be used to act as a content filler on one's own free sites or fake TGP. Nevertheless, most adult site sponsor programs still provide free hosted galleries to affiliates.

== See also ==
- Fusker Software
