= Album2 =

Photo sharing website

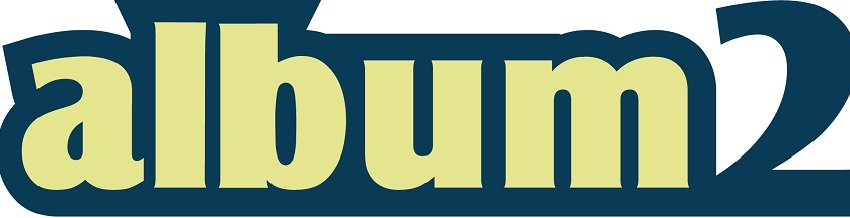
- Website type: Photo sharing
- Headquarters: {{{location_country}}}
- Area served: Worldwide
- Founder: Sveinung Dammen
- Launched: 2004
- Current status: Defunct

Album2 was a photo sharing website "for old local and family photos" launched in 2004, in Oslo, Norway by serial IT entrepreneur Sveinung Dammen. Album2.com made it easy for people to share their old family photos with family and friends, plus the local history club. The service helped to scan photos and add the year, plus smart tagging of grouped faces. Photo share is based on access control to photos by groups and relationships, ensuring privacy and a photo sharing community under strict Norwegian law. According to the website, the name Album2.com has been used to reminds that a second digitalized copy of a family photo album that should always be on the Internet. As of 2021, the website is no longer active.
