= Mrs Stephen Fry =

Mrs Stephen Fry is the fictitious name of a blogger, author and Shorty Awards winning comedy Tweeter best known for her book Mrs Fry's Diary. Edna Fry facetiously claims to be the "downtrodden wife" of Stephen Fry (who is, in reality, homosexual), and mother to their many children.

== Awards ==
In 2010 Edna won the second annual Shorty Awards for comedy, an award presented by the Twitter community, for the Twitter community. Rather than attending the award ceremony in person, Edna sent a video message trimmed to the 140 characters permitted by Twitter.

== Books ==
- Fry, Edna (2011) Mrs Fry's Diary. Hodder & Stoughton General Division. ISBN 978-1-444-72078-5
- Fry, Edna (2014) How to Have an Almost Perfect Marriage. Unbound. ISBN 978-1-78352-024-4

Edna Fry's first book is a catalogue of comedy tweets, recipes and anecdotes about her life with Stephen and their many offspring. The foreword is written by the more famous Stephen Fry, which has led to conjecture that Edna is the creation of Stephen himself, something that was strenuously denied on the @MrsStephenFry Twitter feed. After British newspaper The Daily Telegraph mentioned this notion on 12 October 2010, an outraged Edna called followers to action: "Lovely followers, tweet/email/bombard the Telegraph to confirm I am none other than Edna Constance Bathsheba Fry. Thank you, dears x x". The Daily Telegraph later backed down, publishing an amendment on their website.

== Charity work ==
Edna is the patron of Fry's Gig events. Two events in London, hosting music and comedy performances by up-and-coming artists, raised money for the mental health charity Mind. Fry's Gig New York was held on 22 July 2010 at Sullivan Hall in Greenwich Village, raising money for Housing Works, a charity in New York City that combats HIV/AIDS and homelessness.
