= TwitPic =

Archived service allowing Twitter picture posting

- Screenshot Screenshot of TwitPic in November 2009
- Website type: Image and video sharing
- Available in: English
- Owner: Noah Everett
- Website: www.twitpic.com
- Registration: Required
- Launched: January 31, 2008; 18 years ago
- Current status: Online (read-only)

TwitPic was a website and app that allowed users to post pictures to the Twitter microblogging service, which at the time of TwitPic's creation could not be posted to Twitter directly. TwitPic was often used by citizen journalists to upload and distribute pictures in near real-time as an event was taking place.

== History ==
TwitPic was launched in 2009 by Noah Everett. In an interview with Mixergy, Everett revealed that he had been offered a price in the range of 10 million US dollars for his company but he declined the offer. In 2011, Everett launched Heello, a service that also supports text posts and videos but is less dependent on Twitter. TwitPic's first app was released on 7 May 2012.

Starting mid-2011, Twitter users could upload photos directly, reducing the need to use services like TwitPic.

On September 4, 2014, TwitPic announced that it would shut down on September 25, 2014, following rapidly declining usage and trademark infringement threats by Twitter (who threatened to revoke access to the service's APIs if they did not withdraw their filings to trademark "TwitPic"). However, shortly afterward on September 18, 2014, TwitPic announced that it would not shut down, as it had been acquired by an unspecified company. However, the following month, TwitPic announced that the deal had fallen through, and that they would shut down on October 25, 2014. On October 25, 2014, Twitpic announced that they had reached an agreement with Twitter to give them the TwitPic domain and photo archive.

== Description ==
TwitPic could be used independently of Twitter as an image hosting website similar to Flickr. However, several characteristics made this site a companion for Twitter:

- TwitPic uses usernames and passwords from Twitter
- Comments to photographs are sent as reply tweets
- TwitPic URLs are already short, making it unnecessary to use URL shortening

Anyone with a Twitter account was eligible to post pictures on the site. As of May 2011, TwitPic altered their terms of use, allowing them to distribute the photographs people have uploaded to their "Affiliates". However, TwitPic refused to state who these affiliates may be and what they gain by distributing the pictures. This triggered a public inquiry by users over the possibility of TwitPic publishing user content without compensation. As a result, people began boycotting TwitPic and removing all of their images. TwitPic addressed these concerns in a blog post, claiming that the changes in the terms had been misinterpreted.

== Related applications ==
TweetDeck, Echofon, Tweetie, Twitfile, and Twitterrific are iPhone applications that could upload photos to TwitPic. ÜberTwitter, OpenBeak and Twitter for BlackBerry are BlackBerry applications that had the capability of uploading images to TwitPic. WebOS phones could upload images to TwitPic using the Tweed application. Android phones could upload pictures to TwitPic with the Twidroid and Seesmic applications. Windows Phone devices could upload pictures to TwitPic with the TouchTwit application. All INQ mobile phones had the capability of uploading a picture immediately after it was taken due to the social networking nature of the phone.

Both the official Twitter for Android and Twitter for iPhone applications featured TwitPic as an option for sending pictures to Twitter. (Yfrog was another popular picture-sending option offered by both applications.)

According to a report by Sysomos, as of 30 May 2011, TwitPic was the leading third-party image hosting service for Twitter. Of the nearly 2.25 million daily image shares on Twitter, 45.7% of them came from TwitPic. Twitter announced partnership with Photobucket to be the default photo sharing application on 1 June 2011, with the potential to significantly affect TwitPic's market share.

== In media ==
In January 2009, US Airways Flight 1549 experienced multiple bird strikes and had to be ditched in the Hudson River after takeoff from LaGuardia Airport in New York City. Janis Krums, a passenger on one of the ferries who rushed to help, took a picture of the downed plane as passengers were still evacuating, and tweeted it via TwitPic before traditional media arrived at the scene. The TwitPic service crashed as thousands of people tried to access the photo at the same time. TwitPic also crashed on April 1, 2009, as a result of the large number of photos (and people viewing these photos) being posted from the G20 protests in London.

== See also ==
- yfrog
