= Digital photo frame =

Picture frame that displays digital photos

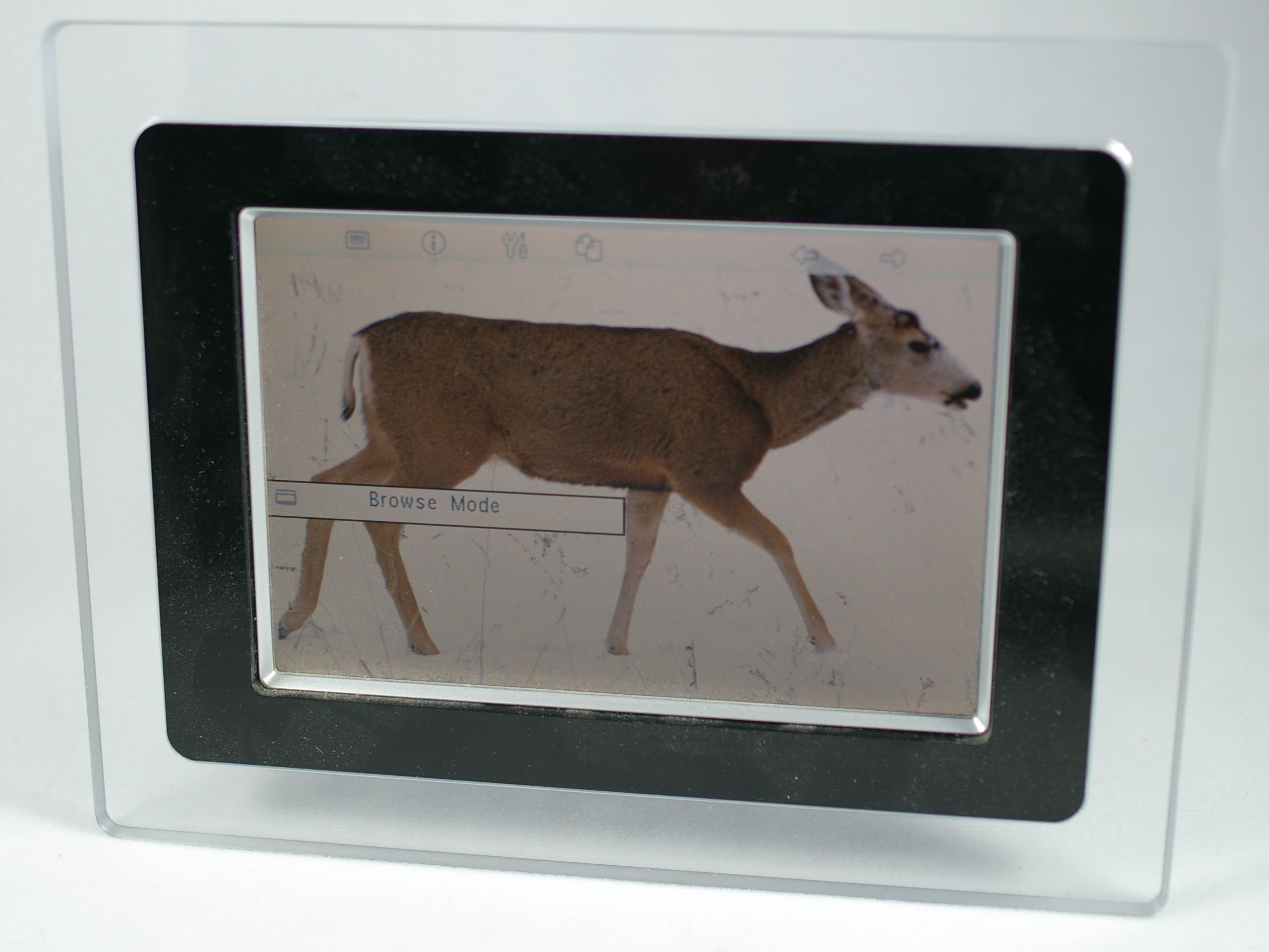
A digital photo frame

A digital photo frame (also called a digital media frame) is a picture frame that displays digital photos without the need of a computer or printer. The introduction of digital photo frames predates tablet computers, which can serve the same purpose in some situations; however, digital photo frames are generally designed specifically for the stationary, aesthetic display of photographs and therefore usually provide a nicer-looking frame and a power system designed for continuous use.

Digital photo frames come in a variety of different shapes and sizes with a range of features. Some may even play videos as well as display photographs. Owners can choose a digital photo frame that utilizes a WiFi connection or not, comes with cloud storage, and/or USB and SD card hub.

== History ==
The first generation of digital photo frames were introduced in the 1990s and included screens with the ability to accept memory cards directly from digital cameras. Widespread adoption of digital cameras in the 1990s left consumers with thousands of digital photos without a viable way to view them. Commercially available digital photo frames started to appear shortly after the introduction of digital photos but did not find market adoption until the mid 2000s when the number of digital photos exploded with the integration of digital cameras into cell phones. First generation frames enjoyed widespread market adoption. The market peaked in 2009 at over $1B worldwide, but the introduction of Apple's iPad started the market's slow decline. First generation frames are still sold today at prices under $100.

The second generation of digital photo frames included connectivity to the Internet. In 1999 with the Ceiva introduced a digital photo frame with dialup connectivity. By 2010 Nixplay and PixStar started to popularize digital frames with wifi connections, allowing consumers to upload photos from the web and connect to cloud based photo sharing and storage sites from Flickr, Picasa, Google Photos, Instagram and Facebook.

By 2016, the third generation of digital photo frames began to appear with companies like PhotoSpring, Aura and Joy. These frames employed tablet platforms to build photo frame features on top of. This allowed the use of touchscreen and battery technology for frames from PhotoSpring and Joy, and camera technology from Aura and Joy.

== Features ==
Digital photo frames range in size from tiny keychain-sized units to large wall-mounted frames spanning several feet. The most common sizes range from 7 inches (18 cm) to 20 inches (51 cm). Some digital photo frames can only display JPEG pictures. Most digital photo frames display the photos as a slideshow and usually with an adjustable time interval. They may also be able to send photos to a printer, or have hybrid features. Examples are the Sony S-Frame F800, that has an integrated printer on its back, or the Epson PictureMate Show.

Digital photo frames typically allow the display of pictures directly from a camera's memory card, and may provide internal memory storage. Some allow users to upload pictures to the frame's memory via a USB connection, or wirelessly via Bluetooth technology. Others include support for wireless (802.11) connections or use cellular technology to transfer and share files. Some frames allow photos to be shared from a frame to another.

Certain frames provide specific application support such as loading images over the Internet from RSS feeds, photo sharing sites such as Flickr, Picasa and from e-mail.

Built-in speakers are common for playing video content with sound, and many frames also feature remote controls. Battery-operated units are also available for portable use.

== Aspect ratio ==
The aspect ratio of the frames can vary. Common aspect ratios include: 4:3, 3:2 and 16:9. (Sometimes 16:9 frames are actually 15:9) Depending on the model and features, images which do not exactly fit the aspect ratio of the frame may be cropped, stretched, or shrunk to fit. This could result in, respectively, images that are missing content, distorted, or which have blank space around them. This can be avoided by buying a frame with an aspect ratio that exactly matches the camera, or editing photos to the target aspect ratio before transferring them to the frame.

== Security issues ==
In February 2008, a number of digital photo frames, such as the Insignia brand digital frames manufactured in China, were found to be carrying a Trojan horse dubbed Mocmex on their internal data storage.

Instagram allow third party app users to connect to their Instagram photo content using OAuth to display photo content and authenticate without the app storing login credentials. Digital photo frame apps are using this secure login protocol to eliminate security issues linked to storing login credentials.

== See also ==
- Internet radio device
- Photo sharing
