= Frank Moss (technologist) =

Frank Moss is a researcher, technology and biotechnology entrepreneur, academic and author. Moss was the director of the MIT Media Lab from 2006 to 2011, where he was the Wiesner Professor of the Practice of Media Arts and Sciences and the principal investigator for the New Media Medicine research group, which he founded.

He is the author of The Sorcerers and Their Apprentices: How the Digital Magicians of the MIT Media Lab Are Creating the Innovative Technologies That Will Transform Our Lives, published in 2011.

From 2007 to 2011, Moss was a trustee of Princeton University, where he served as Chairman of the Alumni Affairs Committee; currently, he is a member of the Leadership Advisory Council for the Princeton School of Engineering and Applied Sciences. He is a trustee of the Jackson Laboratory and also a member of the External Advisory Council of the James M. Anderson Center for Health Systems Excellence at the Cincinnati Children's Medical Center. Moss also served on the leadership advisory council of the Mayo Clinic Center for Innovation.

== Education and early career ==
Moss was born Franklin Moss on April 20, 1949 in Baltimore, Maryland, where he attended the Baltimore Polytechnic Institute. His father was Sam Moss, a local radio personality who had a weekly radio show, The Sam Moss Show, in Baltimore for 30 years. Moss's mother Rose co-produced and co-wrote the show. He is the middle child with older brother Billy, a successful restaurateur and restaurant business broker; and younger sister Ivy, an environmentalist.

As a teenager, Moss became enthralled with America’s fledgling space program, which informed his choice of higher education and career. He received a BS in aerospace and mechanical sciences from Princeton University, and both his MS and PhD in aeronautics and astronautics from MIT. While a research assistant at the Draper Laboratory at MIT, Moss designed the original prototype for the Space Shuttle digital horizontal flight system. In the course of his academic work at MIT, he became exposed to high-performance computing and networking technologies that would later become part of the Internet. His interest in the broad commercial potential of these technologies led him to pursue his professional career in the computer and software industries.

He began his career at IBM's scientific center in Haifa, Israel, where he also taught at the Technion, Israel Institute of Technology. He later held various research and management positions at IBM's Yorktown Heights (NY) Research Center, working on advanced development projects in the areas of networking and distributed computing; and executive management positions at Apollo Computer Inc. and Lotus Development Corporation.

== Career as entrepreneur ==
During his career in the computer and software industries, Moss served as CEO and chairman of Tivoli Systems Inc., a pioneer in the distributed systems management field, which he took public in 1995 and subsequently merged with IBM in 1996. Tivoli was a venture-backed startup that successfully competed with larger companies to redefine and standardize the technology behind network and systems management. The acquisition by IBM became more of a “reverse merger,” in that Tivoli became the network and systems management division of IBM and one of its largest software businesses, growing to several billion dollars. Moss became the general manager of the Tivoli business at IBM; he retired from Tivoli as chairman in 1998.

He also co-founded several other companies, including Stellar Computer, Inc., a developer of graphic supercomputers; and Bowstreet, Inc., a pioneer in the emerging field of Web services that was acquired by IBM and where he was chairman. Moss also served on the advisory board of nLayers Inc., which was later acquired by EMC. In 2009, he co-founded and was a director of Bluefin Labs, which uses machine learning technology to provide brands, agencies and media companies with real-time TV audience response insights through social media analysis. Bluefin was sold to Twitter in 2013 for a reported $100 Million.

Beginning in the early 2000’s, Moss has sought to apply his experience in business and information technology to the life sciences. His 2011 New York Times opinion piece “Our High-Tech Health-Care Future” foreshadowed the emergence of the digital health industry.

He co-founded and was on the board of Infinity Pharmaceuticals, Inc., an early-stage cancer-drug discovery company doing innovative work at the intersection of technology and the life sciences; he retired from Infinity's board in 2011. In addition, he chaired the advisory council for the creation of the Systems Biology Department at Harvard Medical School. He also served as an advisor to a number of startups that pioneered new ways to improve human health by giving people more control over their own health. These include ginger.io (merged with Headspace Health), Maxwell Health (acquired by Sun Life Financial) and Audax Health (acquired by Optum).

In 2012, Moss co-founded and became chairman of Twine Health, which was a spinoff of research performed by his doctoral student and co-founder Dr. John Moore in his New Media Medicine group at the MIT Media Lab. Twine was an early innovator in digital healthcare and provided a platform to enable patients to achieve maximal self-efficacy in managing their chronic conditions in continuous collaboration with their care team. Twine was acquired by FitBit in 2018.

From 2016 to 2019, Moss served as director and strategic advisor to Humatics Inc., a provider of micro-location systems for navigation for robotics and industrial automation.

== Academic career ==
Moss assumed the directorship of the MIT Media Lab in early 2006. Moss worked to enhance the Lab’s connection with sponsors by increasing the interaction between its faculty and students and sponsor representatives on research topics of mutual interest. Two collaborative research initiatives begun during Moss's time as director were the Center for Future Banking, formed with Bank of America, and the Center for Future Storytelling.

Moss also initiated research into areas that go beyond improving our “digital lifestyles” to solving bigger societal problems, such as health care and disability. Examples include the New Media Medicine group, which he founded and headed; and the Human 2.0 program.

In 2009, Moss presided over the Media Lab’s move into a new building. The new building, designed by legendary architect Fumihiko Maki of Japan, was built on the Lab’s research principles of openness and transparency.

== Current work ==
A published author, Moss is a vocal advocate and spokesperson for re-invigorating innovation the United States.

He has been actively involved with a number of startups that are exploring how to use “Big Data” - the proliferation of structured and unstructured data about people – to improve people’s health, wealth and happiness.

Moss is currently active in a diverse set of startups that reflect his eclectic interest, including ArtLifting, a social enterprise that champions artists impacted by housing insecurity and disabilities, where he is a director. He also serves as a strategic advisor to Tamr, Inc, Watershed Informatics and WEVO Conversion.

== Citations ==
His citations include Ernst & Young's Entrepreneur of the Year award and Forbes Magazine's "Leaders for Tomorrow."
