= ArtLifting =

Benefit corporation

ArtLifting is a for-profit benefit corporation founded by Liz Powers and her brother Spencer Powers in 2013. It connects artists with disabilities to socially conscious customers, creating meaningful spaces and products. ArtLifting is headquartered in Boston, MA but works with over 200 different artists across 36 different states.

== History ==
Liz Powers, co-founder of ArtLifting, began working with underprivileged communities at age 18. As a college sophomore, she joined LIFT, a nonprofit empowering families to overcome poverty. There she assisted homeless clients with housing, jobs, and self-esteem.

Through a Harvard grant, Powers started art groups at Boston shelters so residents could connect through art. She was motivated by the talent she saw, though most works were later discarded. In 2011, Powers organized City Heart, an art show featuring 70 artists from 8 shelters.

Her brother Spencer, a Boston College and MIT Sloan graduate, helped manage the annual event. In 2013, the siblings founded ArtLifting with 4 other artists to sell art online, providing income. Early media coverage highlighted artists earning thousands of dollars their first week.

Since its founding, ArtLifting has expanded to 150+ artists in 19 states. In 2015, it announced $1.1 million in seed funding.

== Business model ==
ArtLifting offers artists impacted by homelessness or disability the opportunity to secure their own income through the sale of original paintings, prints, and products. However, each artist only earns a fraction of the revenue of their sale.

=== Benefit corporation status ===
ArtLifting was established as a for-profit benefit corporation, rather than a non-profit 501(c)(3). Benefit corporations “have a corporate purpose to create a material positive impact on society and the environment; and are required to consider the impact of their decisions not only on shareholders but also on workers, community, and the environment.”

As with any for-profit art broker, proceeds are split between artists and ArtLifting. Every artist earns 55% from the profit of each sale. 1% from each sale go toward strengthening art services for community partners that support ArtLifting artists, which includes art programming at social service agencies, shelters, and disability centers. ArtLifting then invests the remaining 44% back into the company to further its mission.

=== Recruiting artists ===
ArtLifting works with individuals who participate in shelter or disability center art programs across the U.S. There are thousands of existing art groups in shelters and disability centers. Their first point of contact is most often the art director who oversees the artists in these programs. ArtLifting's curation team reviews all artwork to determine appropriate fit for ArtLifting's platform and various sales channels including sales of originals, prints, products, and corporate opportunities.

== Artists ==
Scott Benner struggled to find work after the company he worked for closed in 2009. Several years later Benner was diagnosed with Horner's syndrome Benner eventually lost his house in 2013 and became homeless. Benner had created intricate black and white ink drawings his whole life, but had never thought of selling them before his partnership with ArtLifting. Each individual piece can take up to 1,000 hours of work.

Allen Chamberland has chronic obstructive pulmonary disease, which prevented him from finishing his degree in social work. The disease makes it nearly impossible for Chamberland to obtain a traditional job since he “can't walk 10 or 15 feet without getting out of breath.” Chamberland uses an exacto knife and black pieces of paper to create his intricate paper-cut artwork. Chamberland said, “I still wake up surprised some mornings that this is actually working... People like my work ... And without the encouragement and opportunity provided by ArtLifting, I never would have found this out.”

David McCauley injured his spinal cord in a diving accident in 2008. McCauley is an artist himself and is the founder of Rise Up Gallery, “a nonprofit organization that provides free art therapy workshops to the community and a venue in which emerging artists can exhibit their work.” McCauley partnered with ArtLifting to allow him to allocate more time to the creation of various types of artwork.
