= Streamzoo =

American photo sharing and social networking service

- Available in: English
- Founded: Sunnyvale, California, United States
- Dissolved: March 21, 2014; 12 years ago
- Headquarters: 1290 Oakmead Pkwy; Suite 214; Sunnyvale, CA 94085, United States
- Area served: United States
- Founder: Phonezoo Communications
- Website: Official Site (Archived)
- Registration: Required
- Launched: April 11, 2011; 15 years ago

Streamzoo was a photo and video sharing social networking service that came with photo enhancement functionality. The mobile app was compatible with the Apple iPhone and Android-Smartphones, but site users could also access their accounts online.

Streamzoo was taken offline and off of the Apple iPhone and Android-Smartphones on March 21, 2014. All photos were deleted from the server and cannot be retrieved.

== Background ==
Streamzoo was launched in February 2011 by Phonezoo Communications, Inc., a company founded by Ram Ramkumar and Manish Vaidya, and funded by venture capitalist Tim Draper of DFJ Ventures, Inc. In September 2011, American tech blogger Robert Scoble wrote a tweet opining that "These guys have a better camera much better than Instagram". Streamzoo launched v2.0 of the product in late 2011. Streamzoo became the first cross-platform (iOS, Android & web) based photo sharing social network to offer the ability to collect badges as rewards for contributing photos to specific "streams".

Streamzoo shut down, with all services stopping on March 21, 2014.

== See also ==
- List of free and open-source Android applications
- Photo sharing
