= Photobucket =

American photo storage and image hosting website

- Website type: Image hosting service
- Available in: English
- Owners: Photobucket.com, Inc.
- Creators: Alex Welch, Darren Crystal
- Website: photobucket.com
- Commercial: Yes
- Registration: Optional (required for uploading files)
- Launched: May 8, 2003; 23 years ago
- Current status: Active

Photobucket is an image hosting website, mobile app, and online community that lets users upload, store, organize, and share digital photos and videos online.

Photobucket once hosted more than 10 billion images from 100 million registered members. Links from personal Photobucket accounts were often used for avatars displayed on Internet forums, storage of videos, embedding on blogs, and distribution in social networks. Images hosted on Photobucket were frequently linked to online businesses, online auctions, and classified advertisement websites like eBay and Craigslist.

The website was founded in 2003 by Alex Welch and Darren Crystal and received funding from Trinity Ventures. It was acquired by Fox Interactive Media in 2007. In December 2009, Fox's parent company, News Corp, sold Photobucket to Seattle mobile imaging startup Ontela. Ontela then renamed itself Photobucket Inc. and continues to operate as Photobucket.

In late June 2017, Photobucket dropped its free hosting service, and started requiring a US$99 annual subscription to allow external linking to all hosted images, or a US$399 annual subscription to allow the embedding of images on third-party websites, such as personal blogs and forums. This policy change, enacted with minimal advance notice, has been highly controversial. Even years after abandoning free accounts, Photobucket keeps sending email offers that variously attempt to cajole or threaten users to switch to the paid plan.

At its peak, Photobucket employed 120 people and accounted for 2% of American internet traffic. In 2019, the company employed 10 and ranked approximately 1,500th according to Alexa Internet.

== History ==
Photobucket was founded in 2003 by Alex Welch and Darren Crystal and received funding from Trinity Ventures. It was acquired by Fox Interactive Media in 2007.

In December 2009, Fox's parent company, News Corp, sold Photobucket to Seattle mobile imaging startup Ontela. Ontela then renamed itself Photobucket Inc. and continues to operate as Photobucket.

In 2011, Photobucket became the default photo sharing platform for Twitter. At that time, according to a report by Sysomos, 2.25M images were shared on Twitter daily, which accounted for 1.25% of all Tweets posted.

On November 15, 2012, Photobucket announced the availability of "Photobucket Stories" which enables the user to combine photos, videos, and text into complete, sharable narratives.

On June 28, 2017, Photobucket changed its Terms of Use regarding free accounts and third party hosting (hosting on forums, eBay, etc.). Only the most expensive plan, at US$399.99 per year, permitted third party hosting and linking to forums.

In 2017, Denver Better Business Bureau gave the company an "F" rating, the worst they issue, citing fifteen complaints related to the change in terms and no response from the company. The company is not BBB-Accredited.

On May 17, 2018, Photobucket introduced new plans, including US$24.99/year that included 3rd party hosted images.

In 2019, they introduced two plans that include third party hosted images, US$29.99/year with 2 GB or US$69.99/year with 20 GB. Effective June 1, 2019, free Photobucket and the "beginner" paid plan accounts were restricted to a hosting bandwidth of 25 MB per month. Free accounts who use more than 25 MB of bandwidth will have all of their hosted photos watermarked and blurred.

On December 11, 2024, a class-action lawsuit was filed against Photobucket after the company changed its privacy policy to allow Photobucket to sell user's photos to companies training AI models. The lawsuit alleges that Photobucket violated privacy laws in California, New York, and Illinois by using the photos without obtaining user consent, forcing users to agree to Photobucket's new privacy policy to delete their accounts, using sensitive geolocation and biometric data in the training data, and violating intellectual property laws.

In early 2026, Photobucket updated its service tiers to include a Free Plan for new users. This plan allows users to organize and share photos and videos with restrictions on the number of buckets and visible media per bucket, providing an entry point to the platform’s core features without a paid subscription.

== Features ==
The service supports both individual use and community-oriented sharing through its Group Buckets, where members can collaborate by contributing and viewing shared albums.

Photobucket allows registered users to upload an extensive range of image and video formats, preserving original quality with its compression-free guarantee.

Media can be made private by default or shared via customizable sharing links or within private groups.

The service is available through web browsers and a dedicated mobile app experience that offers auto backup, organization tools, photo editing, album creation, and cross-platform access.

Users can organize content into Buckets and Albums, adjust views and sort orders, and order physical prints directly through the app or website interface.

Photobucket operates on a subscription model with tiered storage and feature options. Plans include basic storage and backup, Group Bucket sharing, personal and social sharing tools, mobile auto backup, photo editing, video playback, and direct hosting links for embedding in blogs, listings, and forums. Higher-tier plans provide extensive hosting capabilities and unlimited storage.

=== Fuskering ===
Although it is possible to set Photobucket albums to "private", this does not prevent the photos within being accessed by someone who knows or can guess the URL. Programs called fuskers exist, which can test for likely photo URLs. This has led to "private" photos on Photobucket being downloaded and distributed elsewhere on the Internet without the consent of their uploaders.

== See also ==
- Comparison of video hosting services
- Imgur
- List of online video platforms
- List of image-sharing websites
- TinyPic
