= TweetDeck =

Social media dashboard application of X (Twitter)

X Pro

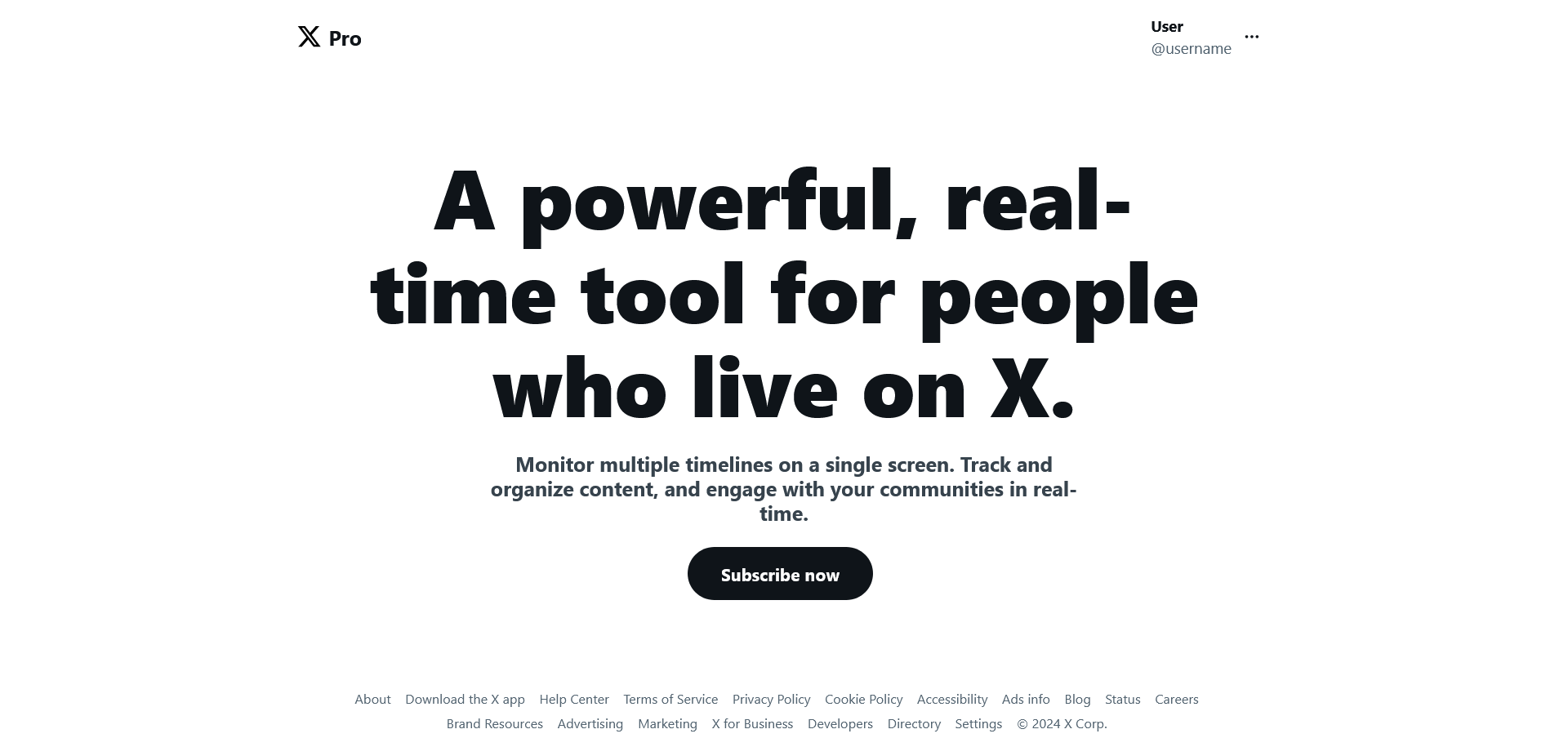
- Home page
- Original author: Iain Dodsworth
- Developers: X Corp. (2023–present); Twitter Inc. (2011–2023); TweetDeck Ltd. (2009–2011)
- Release: July 4, 2008; 18 years ago
- Stable release: July 4, 2023; 3 years ago (v2, paywalled)
- Type: X (formerly Twitter) social media client
- Website: pro.x.com

X Pro (formerly known as TweetDeck) is a paid proprietary social media dashboard for management of X (formerly Twitter) accounts. Originally an independent app, TweetDeck was subsequently acquired by Twitter, Inc. and integrated into Twitter's interface. It had long ranked as one of the most popular Twitter clients by percentage of tweets posted, alongside the official Twitter web client and the official apps for iPhone and Android.

Like other Twitter applications, it uses the Twitter API and permits users to send and receive tweets and to view profiles. On July 4, 2023, Twitter's Support account advised that in 30 days, users must be verified (and be subscribed to Premium) to use TweetDeck. TweetDeck was made unavailable to non-verified users by August 17, 2023.

It can be used as a web app. Until 2015 it could also be used as a Chrome app and until 2022 it could also be used as a macOS app. Users are now redirected to the web app.

Effective March 26, 2026, X Pro is available to Premium+ subscribers and above.

== User interface ==
TweetDeck consists of a series of customizable columns, which can be set up to display the user's Twitter timeline, mentions, direct messages, lists, trends, favorites, search results, hashtags, or all posts by or to a single user. It is similar to the "Dashboard App" that was discontinued in 2016. The client uses Twitter's own automatic and invisible URL shortening whereby a link of any length will only use 23 characters of a Tweet's 280-character limit. All columns can be filtered to include or exclude words or posts from users. Posts can be sent immediately or scheduled for later delivery.

Users can monitor multiple accounts simultaneously. For added account security, users signing in with their X username and password can use Twitter's own two-step verification.

As of May 2015, TweetDeck added a "confirmation step" feature, giving users the option to require an extra step before sending a tweet. A February 2018 change to the Twitter API restricted the ability of TweetDeck and other third-party applications from sending mass tweets due to concerns over abuse of bots mass posting content and posts. The change also restricts the ability of using multiple accounts via the API.

In July 2021, Twitter released a new preview version of TweetDeck. It incorporates more functionality from the main Twitter website, including "a full Tweet Composer, new advanced search features, new column types, and a new way to group columns into clean workspaces".

On February 9, 2023, it was reported that TweetDeck would become paywalled and require a Twitter Blue subscription to access. This assertion was based on examination of the website code used for TweetDeck, which specifically referenced Twitter Blue.

On July 1, 2023, legacy TweetDeck's functionality was impacted by API changes imposed by Elon Musk to prevent data scraping of the platform for artificial intelligence models, including strict rate limits and the complete removal of a number of API endpoints that were used by the platform without any prior warning.

On July 3, 2023, Twitter subsequently announced that the "preview" version of TweetDeck had exited beta, with all users to be migrated to this new version by the end of the week, but with certain features (such as Teams, which allows other users to be invited to contribute tweets to an account via TweetDeck) not being immediately available. The service will also only be available to verified accounts from August. It was later reported the original version of TweetDeck had been re-enabled, but it is not yet known whether this version will remain available on a long-term basis or at no charge.

== Product history ==
TweetDeck was originally an independent Twitter client created by Iain Dodsworth. Its first version was released on July 4, 2008. The iPhone version was released on June 19, 2009. In May 2010, the iPad version of TweetDeck was released after a public beta period. The Android version was made available in October 2010.

On May 25, 2011, Twitter, Inc., the then-operator of the social networking service Twitter acquired TweetDeck. On September 15, 2011, TweetDeck tweeted an announcement for a new update for all versions of its application. As part of this update, TweetDeck said that, "As part of the process of making TweetDeck more consistent with Twitter.com & Twitter's mobile apps, we're removing deck.ly from our apps." Deck.ly previously allowed users to post tweets in excess of the 140-character limit. Many users expressed their anger at this feature removal in the comments on the iOS and Android Market.

Twitter released a new version of TweetDeck on December 8, 2011, branded as "TweetDeck by Twitter", as part of Twitter's redesign of its services. TweetDeck changed from an Adobe AIR application to a native Windows and Mac OS X application in this release, introducing a web version of TweetDeck for WebKit-based browsers based on TweetDeck's existing Google Chrome App. The update dropped support for LinkedIn, Google Buzz, Foursquare, MySpace accounts.

On March 4, 2013, TweetDeck announced in a blog post that they would be suspending mobile versions of TweetDeck including TweetDeck AIR, TweetDeck for iPhone and TweetDeck for Android, which were removed from their respective app stores in May. TweetDeck said they would "focus our development efforts on our modern, web-based versions".

Users were informed in May 2013 that "Facebook is no longer supported in TweetDeck", and that Facebook accounts and Facebook columns would be removed on May 7. All unofficial variants of TweetDeck stopped working in early May 2013 because of more restrictive API version 1.1. At 12:00 PM EDT, Twitter turned off API v1, which effectively shut down the Android, iOS, and AIR versions of TweetDeck.

On December 11, 2013, Twitter began allowing new TweetDeck users to sign in with their Twitter usernames and passwords, removing the previous barrier-to-entry requiring users to register a separate TweetDeck account. In a blog post, Twitter said, "When single sign in is fully available to all current users, we'll also make it possible to seamlessly integrate your current TweetDeck settings and preferences".

A cross-site scripting vulnerability in TweetDeck was discovered on June 11, 2014, leading to a self-replicating tweet that affected over 83,000 Twitter users. The Windows app ceased functioning on April 15, 2016. The macOS app stopped functioning on July 1, 2022, with users being directed to the TweetDeck website instead.

Twitter announced on July 3, 2023, that TweetDeck will become a Twitter Blue exclusive feature in a month's time. Elon Musk stated on July 29, 2023, that TweetDeck will soon been renamed XPro, matching Twitter's rebranding to X. Around the same time, the @TweetDeck handle was changed to @Pro, and the name was altered to have a space between X and Pro. X Pro became a Premium feature on August 15, 2023.

On November 27, 2023, the service's URL was changed from tweetdeck.twitter.com to pro.twitter.com. It was subsequently changed to pro.x.com on May 17, 2024, when X changed its main URL from twitter.com to x.com.

On March 26, 2026, existing Premium users attempting to use the feature received the message "X Pro is only accessible on the X Premium+ plan and above. Please upgrade your plan to use X Pro." X did not announce the change in advance.

== Integration with other social networking services ==
Originally, as it is now, TweetDeck was aimed towards the Twitter social networking service. Over the years, TweetDeck introduced support for other social networks, but has since removed that support.

On March 16, 2009, a pre-release version was released featuring Facebook status updates integration. As of April 8, 2009, Facebook status updates were part of the standard program. From version 0.30 TweetDeck also supported MySpace integration. Version 0.32, released on November 30, 2009, added LinkedIn integration and new Twitter features. In May 2010 TweetDeck also added integration with the Google Buzz and Foursquare social networks.

In 2012 TweetDeck reverted to only supporting Twitter and Facebook, ending support for LinkedIn, MySpace, and the now defunct Google Buzz effective June 2012.

In May 2013, TweetDeck removed support for Facebook accounts.

== TweetDeck Ltd (company) ==
A year after launching TweetDeck in 2008, Iain Dodsworth received his initial $300,000 seed funding from The Accelerator Group, Howard Lindzon, Taavet Hinrikus, Gerry Campbell, Roger Ehrenberg, betaworks, Brian Pokorny, and Bill Tai. The company raised a Series A round of funding with many of these same investors, and Ron Conway, Danny Rimer, and the SV Angel group.

On May 25, 2011, TweetDeck was bought by Twitter for £25 million, after a bidding war with Bill Gross's UberMedia.

On January 22, 2013, The American directors of Twitter were sent a letter by Companies House (the United Kingdom Registrar of Companies) warning them that their UK subsidiary company TweetDeck Ltd. was at risk of closure, over missed accounting deadlines. This had no bearing on the product or service which was by then run by Twitter, not by TweetDeck Ltd, which was officially struck off the business register by Companies House, and dissolved, for failure to file accounts for 2011.
