= Image sharing =

Publishing or transfer of photos online

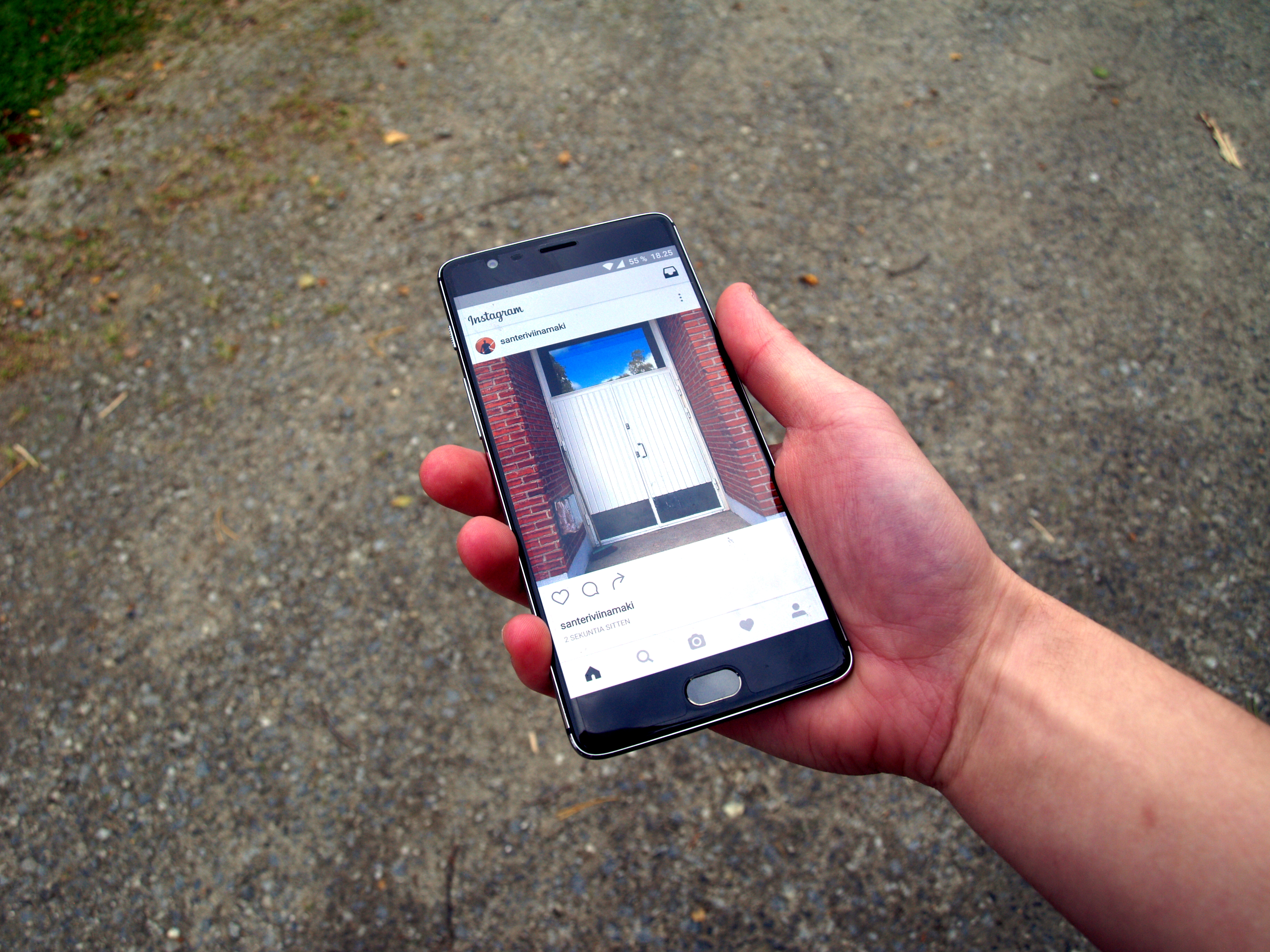
A photo shared on the Instagram app

Image sharing, or photo sharing, is the publishing or transfer of digital photos online. Image sharing websites offer services such as uploading, hosting, managing and sharing of photos (publicly or privately). This function is provided through both websites and applications that facilitate the upload and display of images. The term can also be loosely applied to the use of online photo galleries that are set up and managed by individual users, including photoblogs. Sharing means that other users can view but not necessarily download images, and users can select different copyright options for their images.

While photoblogs tend only to display a chronological view of user-selected medium-sized photos, most photo sharing sites provide multiple views (such as thumbnails and slideshows), the ability to classify photos into albums, and add annotations (such as captions or tags).

Desktop photo management applications may include their own photo-sharing features or integration with sites for uploading images to them. There are also desktop applications whose sole function is sharing images, generally using peer-to-peer networking. Basic image sharing functionality can be found in applications that allow you to email photos, for example by dragging and dropping them into pre-designed templates.

Photo sharing is not confined to the web and personal computers, but is also possible from portable devices such as camera phones, either directly or via MMS. Some cameras now come equipped with wireless networking and similar sharing functionality themselves.

== History ==
During the 1984 Los Angeles Olympics, Japanese photographers from Asahi Shimbun and Yomiuri Shimbun newspapers needed to quickly send photos back to their Tokyo offices under tight deadlines. They used a prototype Canon Sill Video System D1413 still video camera to capture digital photos on a video floppy disk, selected key shots on a display monitor, and transmitted the images to Tokyo over a phone line. It took 6 minutes to transfer a black-and-white image and 24 minutes for a color photo.

Nippon Telegraph and Telephone (NTT) launched the Integrated Services Network (INS‑Net), the first commercial Integrated Services Digital Network (ISDN), for the Japanese market in 1988. It launched with an image sharing service supporting high-resolution color digital images.

The first photo sharing web sites originated during the mid-to-late 1990s, primarily from services providing online ordering of prints (photo finishing), but many more came into being during the early 2000s with the goal of providing permanent and centralized access to a user's photos, and in some cases video clips too. Webshots, SmugMug, Yahoo! Photos and Flickr were among the first. This has resulted in different approaches to revenue generation and functionality among providers.

In 1995, Webshots was one of the first online photo sharing platforms. Webshots offered an easy-to-use interface and basic photo editing tools. In 2002, SmugMug was founded, focusing on providing a high-quality photo sharing experience for professional photographers. SmugMug offers features such as custom photo galleries and e-commerce options. In 2003, Yahoo! Photos was one of the most popular photo sharing platforms thanks to its integration with Yahoo's email and search services. In 2004, Flickr was founded, quickly becoming popular due to its vibrant photography community and effective tagging system.

The 2010s saw the rise of mobile apps and cloud storage. The advent of smartphones with high-quality cameras and the availability of cloud storage services such as Google Photos, Dropbox, and iCloud Photo Library revolutionized the way people take, store, and access their photos. Mobile apps such as Instagram, Snapchat, and TikTok emerged, offering a simple and socially focused photo sharing experience. These apps met the need for instant sharing with friends and followers.

In recent years, AI and machine learning have become increasingly integrated into photo sharing platforms. AI is being used to improve image quality, automatically tag images with relevant keywords, detect and filter inappropriate content, and create new effects and filters. AI has the potential to revolutionize the way people share photos, making it easier for them to share better-looking images and find relevant images.

== Revenue models ==
Image sharing sites can be broadly divided into two groups: sites that offer photo sharing for free and sites that charge consumers directly to host and share images.

Of the sites that offer free photo sharing, most can be divided into advertising-supported media plays and online photo finishing sites, where photo sharing is a vehicle to sell prints or other merchandise. These designations are not strict, and some subscription sites have a limited free version. Consumers can share their photos directly from their home computers over high speed connections through peer-to-peer photo sharing using applications. Peer-to-peer photo sharing often carries a small one-time cost for the software. Some sites allow you to post your pictures online and they will then project the image onto famous buildings during special events, while other sites let you insert photos into digital postcards, slide shows and photo albums and send them to others.

Some free sites are owned by camera manufacturers, and only accept photos made with their hardware.

=== Subscription-based ===
In return for a fee, subscription-based photo sharing sites offer their services without the distraction of advertisements or promotions for prints and gifts. They may also have other enhancements over free services, such as guarantees regarding the online availability of photos, more storage space, the ability for non-account holders to download full-size, original versions of photos, and tools for backing up photos. Some offer user photographs for sale, splitting the proceeds with the photographer, while others may use a disclaimer to reserve the right to use or sell the photos without giving the photographer royalties or notice.

Some image sharing sites have begun integrating video sharing as well.

== Sharing methods ==
=== Peer-to-peer ===
With the introduction of high speed (broadband) connections directly to homes, it is feasible to share images and videos without going through a central service. The advantages of peer-to-peer sharing are reduced hosting costs and no loss of control to a central service. The downsides are that the consumer does not get the benefit of off-site backup; consumer Internet service providers (ISPs) often prohibit the serving of content both by contract and through the implementation of network filtering, and there are few quality guarantees for recipients. However, there are typically no direct consumer costs beyond the purchase of the initial software, provided the consumer already has a computer with the photos at home on a high speed connection. Applications like Tonido provide peer-to-peer photo sharing.

=== Peer-to-server ===
Operating peer-to-peer solutions without a central server can create problems as some users do not leave their computers online and connected all the time. Using an always-on server like Windows Home Server which acts as an intermediate point, it is possible to share images peer-to-peer with the reliability and security of a central server. Images are securely stored behind a firewall on the Windows Home Server and can be accessed only by those with appropriate permissions.

=== Peer-to-browser ===
A variation on the peer-to-peer model is peer-to-browser, whereby images are shared on one PC with the use of a local (on the host computer) software service (much like peer-to-peer) but made available to the viewer through a standard web browser. Technically speaking, this may still be described as peer-to-peer (with the second peer being a web browser) but it is characteristically different as it assumes no need to download peer software for the viewer. Photos are accessed by regular URLs that standard web browsers understand natively without any further software required. Consequently, photos shared in this way are accessible not only to users who have downloaded the correct peer software (compatible with the software in use by the sharer).

Peer-to-browser sharing has (similar to peer-to-peer) reduced hosting costs, no loss of control to a central service, and no waiting for files to upload to the central service. Furthermore, universal web browser access to shared files makes them more widely accessible and available for use in different ways, such as embedding in, or linking to, from within web pages. As with peer-to-peer, the downsides are lack of off-site backup, possible inhibition by some ISPs, and limitations in speed of serving.

=== Social networks ===
With the emergence of social networks, image sharing has now become a common online activity. For example, in Great Britain, 70% of online users engaged in image sharing in 2013; 64% of British users shared their photos through a social network. Facebook stated in 2015 that there were approximately two billion images uploaded to its service daily. In terms of image sharing, Facebook is the largest social networking service. On Facebook, people can upload and share their photo albums individually, and collaboratively with shared albums. This feature allows multiple users to upload pictures to the same album, and the album's creator has the ability to add or delete contributors. Twitter collaborated with Photobucket in developing a new photo sharing service so users can attach a picture to a tweet without depending on another application such as TwitPic or Yfrog. As of June 2016, there were more than 500 million monthly active Instagram users.

=== Link aggregation sites ===
Image sharing on social news and image aggregation sites such as Reddit, Imgur, 4chan, Pinterest and Tumblr allow users to share images with a large community of users. Images are the most liked content of the aggregation and media sharing site Reddit; and according to data analyst Randy Olson as of August 2014, nearly 2/3 of all successful posts on the site were links to an image hosted on Imgur.

=== Mobile ===
Sharing images via mobile phones has become popular. Several networks and applications have sprung up offering capabilities to share captured photos directly from mobile phones to social networks. The most prominent of these is Instagram, which has quickly become the dominant image sharing-centric social network with over 500 million members. Other applications and networks offering similar service and growing in popularity include Streamzoo, Path, PicsArt, Piictu, and Starmatic.

=== Apps ===
Instagram, Snapchat, and Nice are examples of photo sharing apps with millions of users.

== Technologies ==
=== Web photo album generators ===
Software can be found on the Internet to generate digital photo albums, usually to share photos on the web, using a home web server. In general, this is for advanced users that want to have better control over the appearance of their web albums and the actual servers they are going to run on.

=== Image classification ===
Image sharing sites usually propose several ways to classify images. Most sites propose at least a taxonomy where images can be grouped within a directory-like structure in so-called "galleries". Some sites also allow users to classify images using tags to build a folksonomy. Depending on the restrictions on the set of users allowed to tag a single document and the set of tags available to describe the document, one speaks about narrow and broad folksonomies. A folksonomy is broad when there is no restriction on the set of taggers and available tags. When there are limitations, the folksonomy is called narrow. Another mechanism is coupling taxonomy and folksonomy, where tags associated to galleries and artists are cascaded to the galleries and artist's pictures. Broad taxonomies have interesting properties like the power law.

=== Photo tagging ===
Photo tagging is the process that allows users to tag and group photos of an individual or individuals. With facial recognition software tagging photos can become quicker and easier; the more tagging done of an individual the more accurate the software can be. This type of software is currently in use on Facebook. Photo tagging is a way of labeling photos so that viewers can know who is who in the picture. On most online photo sharing sites such as Facebook, a tag can also be used as a link that when clicked will take you to the person's profile that was tagged. Most of the time photos can only be tagged by the user to uploads the photo but on some sites photos can be tagged by other users as well. These tags can be searched for across the entire Internet, on separate websites or in private data bases. They can be used for crowdsourced classification (see the section on image classification) but can also play a socio-cultural role in that they can establish neologisms, Internet memes, snowclones, slogans, catch phrases, shared vocabularies and categorizations as well as producing comedic twists, contexts and perspectives of the presented images, and hence often play a significant role in the community building and identity formation of and the entertainment in online communities that allow the creation of broad folksonomies.

=== Geotagging ===
Geotagging a photo is the process in which a photo is marked with the geographical identification of the place it was taken. Most technology with photo taking capabilities are equipped with GPS system sensors that routinely geotag photos and videos. Crowdsourced data available from photo-sharing services have the potentiality of tracking places. Geotagging can reveal the footprints and behaviors of travelers by utilizing spatial proximity of geo-tagged photos that are shared online, making it possible to extract travel information relating to a particular location. Instagram, Flickr, and Panoramio are a few services that provide the option of geotagging images. Flickr has over 40 million geotagged photos uploaded by 400 thousand users, and still growing at a rapid pace. Some sites including Panoramio and Wikimedia Commons show their geocoded photographs on a map, helping the user find pictures of the same or nearby objects from different directions.

== Criticism ==
Critics of image/photo sharing are concerned with the use of applications such as Instagram, because they believe that the behaviors portrayed on these sites could potentially be linked to the narcissism trait. Keen argues that "Self" is running digital culture, and he states that people use social-media platforms because they are interested in advertising themselves. Buffardi and Campbell (2008) also alleged that Instagram offers "a gateway for self-promotion via self-descriptions, vanity via photos, and a large amount of shallow relationships." However, they later said that the large number of users suggests the general psychology of the members is normative.

=== Privacy ===
Privacy activists and researchers have noted that the sharing of images on social networks may compromise the privacy of people depicted in them. Further, most current social networks afford their users little control over content that they did not post themselves. In its privacy policy, Facebook states that any information posted using its service, including images, may be used to display relevant ads to its users. Facebook utilizes automatic facial recognition software that can automatically recognize the face of another Facebook user in new photos, and suggest that the user be tagged in the photo. A Ghent University study found that employers commonly search for prospective employees on Facebook, and may decide whether or not to grant an interview based on the person's profile picture.

== Purposes ==
The increasing ease of use has encouraged image sharing in insurance, including crop insurance. The insurance company and farmer have a shared interest in the current state of a field. This method allows crop health to be monitored more quickly and easily than any other way.

== See also ==
- Digital photo frame
- File hosting service
- File sharing
- Image hosting service
- List of image-sharing websites
- List of photo and video apps
- Timeline of file sharing
