= Image hosting service =

Service for hosting images on an Internet website

An image hosting service or image repository allows individuals to upload images to an Internet website. The image host will then store the image onto its server, and show the individual different types of code to allow others to view that image. Some examples are Flickr, Imgur, and Photobucket.

== How it works ==
Typically image hosting websites provide an upload interface; a form in which the uploader specifies the location of an image file on their local computer file system. After pressing a "Submit" button, the file is uploaded to the image host's server. Some image hosts allow the uploader to specify multiple files at once using this form, or the ability to upload one ZIP archive containing multiple images. Additionally, some hosts allow FTP access, where single or multiple files can be uploaded in one session using FTP software or an FTP-capable browser.

After this process, the image is hosted on the server. Typically, this means that the image is available on the web (to the public). The uploader may also be allowed to specify inline links to the hosted image, in order to embed it on other websites e.g.

- Linking with HTML code
- Linking with BBcode
- A clickable thumbnail that is linked to the full image

Usually, the image host will put restrictions on the maximum image size allowed, or the maximum space or bandwidth allowed per user. Due to bandwidth costs, free services usually offer relatively modest size limits per image when compared to paid services, but allow users hotlinking their images.

== Tools ==
Image hosts also allow tools such as the ability to create photoblogs/galleries with your images, or add them to a slide show for easier viewing. Some offer more advanced tools such as the ability for anl to ato an image they uploaded, sideloaders, or browser sidebars. Other hosts have introduced novel features such as the ability to automatically resize images down to a user-selected size. A Flickr tool allows one to upload photos using a camera phone with email capability.

== Identification ==
Hosting services have the potential ability to identify when and where their images are being used. When an image file is accessed, the image host is capable of logging the date and the general numeric internet address of the request.

In the case of spam, the messages often include unique image URLs that are specific to that message only. The unique URL is used as a tracking ID, so that the image host can identify exactly what message intended for what specific recipient has been viewed, in addition to the date and host accessing the image. This is why many email reading systems do not show images by default, to protect the reader from having their reading of spam being tracked by the email senders.

== Cost ==
Many image hosts are free, some do not even require registration. Of the free image hosts, the vast majority are supported by advertisements, mostly on their top pages, thumbnail pages, or "not found" pages. Showing advertisements to users has enabled image size and bandwidth limits to increase.

Some free hosts have optional paid image hosting functions, while other hosts offer only paid services. Features and storage available are generally better for paid services, while cost is still much less than the cost of purchasing webhosting to operate a website. Paid services often allow users to have password protected photo albums, customizable skins, and customized subdomains. There are many other paid services available that offer different packages of options, features, and costs.

== History ==
Before the development of image hosting services, the display and exchange of images on the early public Internet of the 1980s–1990s was a laborious and complex process. Expertise was needed to set up a private file server, to connect it to the Internet, and paying for the potentially expensive dedicated Internet connection. Some experts would provide access to a Unix shell and some file storage, via paid access, free public access, or just made available to a select group of private friends. Uploading of images was accomplished with command-line tools like FTP, or uploading images using slow 14.4 to 33.6 kilobit dialup modem connections and terminal protocols like XMODEM to the server storage.

Before the Web was developed, images would primarily be downloaded manually from file servers or from binary newsgroups on Usenet, and displayed with a separate image viewer. The expansion of the Web in the 1990s brought text and images together, allowing for inline display of images without separate downloading, but still required the above expertise and methods to make the images available.

Also, on the early web, some technical knowledge was required to know how to even make an uploaded image display on a discussion forum. Typically, images would accessed using a URL format similar to:

http://www.example.com/~username/directory/image.jpg

but to make the image actually display in a discussion forum, this would need to be manually rewritten in HTML markup in the forum post, as

<img src="http://www.example.com/~username/directory/image.jpg">

One of the primary new features of the early and developing Web that enabled the easy sharing of images and other data, was the concept of being able to upload or HTTP POST a file via the web browser to the remote server. This alone helped to eliminate all the complex steps of needing to understand command line tools like FTP or uploading via a modem terminal.

Early image and data storage servers also initially left the uploaded content unchanged, sometimes resulting in undesirable web page display problems, such as too high resolution causing page layout problems in discussion forums, or too high detail causing very slow page loading times. The sharing of potentially incompatible image formats could also result in them not displaying properly for some viewers.

The early and developing image sharing services eventually added the ability to automatically resize and recompress uploaded images into standardized sizes and formats, for maximum browser compatibility and minimizing of bandwidth usage for unnecessarily large images.

The provision for early image sharing services to automatically create sharing links also reduced the need for technical knowledge of where the image was uploaded.

== See also ==
- Image sharing
- List of image-sharing websites
