= List of social networking services =

A social networking service is an online platform that people use to build social networks or social relationships with other people who share similar personal or career interests, activities, backgrounds or real-life connections.

This is a list of notable active social network services, excluding online dating services, that have Wikipedia articles. For defunct social networking websites, see List of defunct social networking services.

Name	Type	Focus
23snaps		Parents save photos, videos, measurements and stories of their children
4chan	Imageboard	Anime, manga, video games, music, literature, fitness, politics, and sports
Academia.edu		Academics/researchers
About.me		Promote individuals
Amikumu		Language learners
ANobii		Books
Anphabe.com		Employment website
Are.na		Social network and creative research platform
aSmallWorld		European jet set and social elite worldwide
Athlinks		Running, swimming
Band		Group communication, South Korea
beBee		Personal brands
Behance		Showcasing and discovering creative works
BeReal		Photo-sharing app
BlackPlanet		Black Americans
Blind		Employees
Blogger	Blog	
Blacksky		Alternative to Black Twitter
Bluesky		Microblogging, decentralized alternative to Twitter
Busuu		Language learning
Buzznet		Music and pop-culture
CafeMom		Mothers
Cara		
Care2		Green movement
CaringBridge		Connections after a serious health event.
Cellufun		Mobile Social-network game
Chess.com		Chess players
Clapper		Videos
Classmates.com		Alumni
CouchSurfing	Hospitality exchange service	Homestays and hospitality
CozyCot		East Asian and Southeast Asian women
Cyworld		Popular in South Korea.
DailyStrength		Medical & emotional support community
Dayviews		Sweden
Dead Runners Society		Running
DeviantArt		Art community
Diaspora*		Distributed social network
Discord		Live chat and voice for groups
Dispo		Photosharing
Draugiem.lv		Popular in Latvia, Lithuania, Hungary
Douban		Chinese movies, books, and music
Doximity		U.S. medical doctors
Dreamwidth		Blogging
Dulwich OnView	Blog	Dulwich
DXY.cn		Chinese health care professionals
Elixio		Business executives jet set and global elite
English, baby!		Students and teachers of English as a second language
eToro		Social investing, finance
Experts Exchange		IT professionals
Facebook	Blog	Photos, videos, blogs, apps
Faces		Women in digital media
Fandom		Wiki
Fark		Comment on news stories
Fieldoo		Soccer players
Fetlife		BDSM
Fillos de Galicia		Galicia
FilmAffinity	Movies and TV series	
Filmow		Movies and TV series
Fishbrain		Fishing
Flickchart		Movie ranking
Flickr		Photo sharing, commenting, photography related networking
Fotki		Photo and video sharing
Foursquare Swarm		Location-based mobile social network
Friendica		Distributed social network
Fyuse		Photography, 3D images
Gab		Right-wing politics
Gaia Online		Anime and games
Gapo		Vietnam
GameFAQs	FAQ	Video games
GameTZ.com		Trading items
Gays.com		LGBTQ
Gaysir		Gays and bisexuals in Norway
Geni.com		Families, genealogy
Gettr		Free speech
GitHub	social coding	software development
Goodreads		Library cataloging, book lovers
GovLoop		Government employees
Grindr		Gay and bisexual men
Habbo		Teenagers
HeiaHeia		Physical activity journal
Horizon Worlds		Virtual world
HR.com		Human resources professionals
Hub Culture		Ven digital currency
I Had Cancer		Cancer survivors
Ibibo		Talent promotion
Identi.ca		Hackers and software freedom advocates
Imgur		Photo sharing
IMVU	Virtual world	
iNaturalist		
İnci Sözlük		Turkey
Indaba Music		Musicians, remix contests, and networking
Influenster		Product sampling and reviews
Inspire		Healthcare professionals
Instagram		Photo and video sharing
IRC-Galleria		Finland
italki		Language learning
JamiiForums		Tanzania
Jappy		Germany
Kaixin001		Mainland China users
KakaoStory		Pages, South Korea
Kik		Instant messaging
KizlarSoruyor		Question-based
Kobo		Reading platform and social network
Kroogi		Artists
Kumu		Filipino videos
LambdaMOO	MOO	
Laneros		Hispanic countries, gamers
Last.fm		Music
Lemon8		
Letterboxd		Film
LibraryThing		Book lovers
Likee		Videos
LinguaLeo		Online English language learning website. Popular among the Russian-speaking diaspora.
LinkedIn		Business and professional networking
Listography		List-sharing
LiveJournal	Blog	Blogging
Lunchclub		Social meetings
Marco Polo		
Mastodon		Micro-blogging, decentralized alternative to Twitter
MEETin		Social meetings
Meetup		Offline meetings
MeWe		Likes and emojis
Miaopai		
Micro.blog		Microblogging
MocoSpace		Mobile social network
Minds		Distributed social network with Ethereum tokens
mixi		Japan
MocoSpace		Mobile community
Moodle		
MouthShut.com		India
MyHeritage		Family
MyLife		Locating friends and family, keeping in touch
Myspace	Blog	Young people
My World@Mail.Ru		
Newgrounds		Gaming, filming, audio and artwork composition
NK.pl		School, college and friends in Poland
Nexopia		Canada
Nextdoor		
Ning		Create social networks
Odnoklassniki		Connect with former classmates in Russia
Open Diary		Blog
Parler		Free speech and privacy
PatientsLikeMe		Patients with life-changing illnesses
Partyflock		Electronic dance music
Peach		Mobile
PEERtrainer		Weight loss
Pillowfort		
Pinterest		Pinboard for organizing and sharing things you love
Pixnet		Taiwan
Pixelfed		Image sharing
Playlist.com		Music
Plurk		Micro-blogging, RSS in Taiwan
Portfolium		Student employment search
Postcrossing		Send and receive postcards
Quora		Questions and answers
Qzone		In Simplified Chinese; caters for mainland China users
RallyPoint		Military veterans
RateItAll		
Ravelry		Knitting and crochet
Readgeek		Book recommendations
Reddit		News aggregator, social bookmarking, and Internet forums
Renren		China
ResearchGate		
ReverbNation.com		Musicians and bands
Second Life	Virtual world	
ShareChat		India
Sharesome		Adult
Sina Weibo		Microblogging in mainland China
Skoob		Brazilian readers
Snapchat		
Snow		Image messaging
Something Awful	Comedy	Blog
SoundCloud		Repository of original music pieces
Spacehey		
Spaces		Russian mobile phone users
Spot.IM		A service for webmasters to add social networking functionality to their websites
Spoutible		Micro-blogging
Stack Overflow		Question and answer knowledge market site for programmers
Stage 32		Professionals in film, television and theater
Steam		game launcher, forums, live chat
Steemit		Blockchain based social networking
Tagged	Blog	Tagging similar photos and profiles
TakingITGlobal		Youth focused on global issues
Tal Canal	Blog	Sharing content, games and news
Taringa!		Argentina
TermWiki		Learning / languages / translation
The Sphere		Luxury network with exclusive personalized services
The WELL	Bulletin board system	
Threads		
TikTok		Music oriented social media
Total Recut		Video sharing and resources website for fans and creators of video remixes
Travellerspoint		Travel
Trust Café		Subwikis
Truth Social	Mastodon derivative	Trump-affiliated social network
Tuenti		Phone company in Spain with social networking service
Tumblr	Blog	Microblogging
TV Tropes	Wiki	
Untappd		Beer drinking
UpScrolled		
Vero		
VK		Music upload, listening and search. Popular in Russia and former Soviet republics.
Viadeo		Business owners, entrepreneurs and managers
Vingle		Photos
Viva Engage		Office colleagues; formerly Yammer
Wattpad		Readers and authors
Warm Showers	Hospitality exchange service	Homestays and hospitality while bicycle touring
WhatsApp		Instant messaging and communities
Wikipedia	Wiki	
WikiWikiWeb	Wiki	
Woozworld		Tweens and teens
WordPress	Blog	
WriteAPrisoner.com		Inmates connect with friends, family
Wykop.pl		Micro-blogging
X (Twitter)		Micro-blogging, RSS, updates
XING		Business primarily in Germany, Austria, and Switzerland
Xiaohongshu		Popular in China
Yelp		Business review
YTMND		Meme-sharing
Yubo		Business review
zoo.gr		Greeks

== See also ==
- Comparison of free blog hosting services
- Comparison of microblogging and similar services
- List of social bookmarking websites
- List of social gaming networks
- List of most popular social platforms
