= List of photo and video apps =

This is a list of notable mobile apps for use in photography and videography; it includes apps for photo capture, annotation, editing and manipulation, video capture, editing and manipulation. Apps only for video or image sharing or viewing are excluded.

== List ==
Title	Function	Android	iOS	Windows Phone	Website/ Other OS	Open source
17	17 is a free mobile app similar to Periscope and Instagram that includes live video streaming, instant photo and video sharing functions.	Yes	Yes			No
Adobe Photoshop Express	Adobe Photoshop Express is a Flash-based image editing web and mobile application from Adobe used to directly edit photos on blogs and social networking sites, so that users do not have to download or upload images. The application works with sites such as Facebook, Flickr, Picasa and Photobucket.	Yes	Yes			No
Artisto	Artisto is a video processing application with art and movie effects filters based on neural network algorithms.					No
Bazaart	Bazaart an AI-powered design platform with image and video editing capabilities for iOS, Android, MacOS, and the web	Yes	Yes		Yes	No
Citizen	Citizen is a real-time hyperlocal crime and fire reporting app that notifies users based on their individual smartphone locations, issuing incident updates within a quarter mile. Users are updated with a list of details as they become available, and may add live video or other information.	Yes	Yes			No
Clips	Clips is an application developed by Apple that allows the user to combine videos and images and add filters, Live Titles (voice based titles) and music to create a video that can be shared on social media platforms.		Yes			No
DeepArt	DeepArt is a website and app that allows users to create images by using an algorithm to redraw one image using the stylistic elements of another image.	Yes	Yes		Yes	No
eva	eva is a video social network that allows users to record and post short videos from their mobile phones.		Yes			No
EyeEm	EyeEm's image recognition technology uses artificial intelligence to tag and rank images based on an aesthetic score assigned to each photo. When users upload a photo via the Web Upload tool, this technology is applied to determine the discoverability of each photo, and suggest keywords.					No
Facetune	Facetune is a photo editing application developed by Lightricks used to edit, enhance, and retouch photos on a user's iPhone, iPad, Android or Windows Phone device. The app is often used for (yet not limited to) portrait and selfie editing.					No
Fishbrain	Fishbrain is an online mobile logging, photo-sharing and social networking service that enables its users to record data about and take pictures of catches, and share them either publicly or privately on the app					No
FX Photo Studio	FX Photo Studio is a digital photography application for the Apple iPhone. It is compatible with iPhone, iPod Touch, and iPad, requiring iOS 4.3, or later. iPhone users may shoot photographs, download them from their iPhone camera, or from iTunes, and share photos they have edited to appear as though they were taken with a film camera, or like sketches.		Yes			No
Fyuse	Fyuse is a spatial photography app which lets users capture and share interactive 3D images. By tilting or swiping ones smartphone, one can view such "fyuses" from various angles — as if one was walking around an object or subject.	Yes	Yes			No
Hipstamatic	Hipstamatic is a digital photography application for the Apple iPhone and Windows Phone sold by Synthetic Corporation. It uses the phone's camera to allow the user to shoot square photographs, to which it applies a number of software filters to make the images look as though they were taken with a vintage film camera.					No
Hyperlapse	Hyperlapse is a mobile app created by Instagram that enables users to produce hyperlapse and time-lapse videos.					No
CapCut	Developed by the well-known gait tech company Bytedance, owned by TikTok.	Yes	Yes		MacOs	Yes
iMovie	iMovie is a video editing software application sold by Apple Inc. for the Mac and iOS.		Yes			No
Instagram	Users can upload photographs and short videos, follow other users' feeds and geotag images with longitude and latitude coordinates, or the name of a location. Users can connect their Instagram account to other social networking sites, enabling them to share uploaded photos to those sites.					No
iPhoto	iPhoto can import, organize, edit, print and share digital photos.	No	Yes	No	macOS	No
Miaopai	Miaopai is a Chinese video sharing and live streaming service.					No
MixBit	MixBit's website lets users create dynamic shared videos.					No
Neighbors	Ring Video Doorbell's hyperlocal, moderated, private social networking neighborhood watch crime and safety portal allows users to share video captured by Ring and to crowdsource related information.	Yes	Yes			No
Nextdoor	Nextdoor is a hyperlocal, moderated social networking service platform visible to confirmed users within a defined geographic area. The website and app offer photo and video posting, chat and messaging.	Yes	Yes		Yes	No
Periscope	Periscope is a live video streaming app for iOS and Android acquired by Twitter before launch in 2015.	Yes	Yes			No
Photomath	Photomath is a "camera calculator" for iOS and Android which uses a phone's camera for recognition of mathematical patterns from handwriting or notebooks and displays them directly onscreen.	Yes	Yes			No
Photos	Photos is a photo management and editing application developed by Apple.	No	Yes	No	macOS	No
PicsArt Photo Studio	PicsArt is a photographer editing, collage and drawing application and a social network. PicsArt enables users to take and edit pictures, draw with layers, and share their images with the PicsArt community and on other networks like Facebook and Instagram.	Yes	Yes	Yes		No
Prisma	Prisma is a photo-editing application that utilizes a neural network and artificial intelligence to transform the image into an artistic effect.	Yes	Yes			No
Process	Process is a non-linear editing photography software designed for iOS devices. It can import, edit, and share digital photos, and perform non-destructive editing using hardware acceleration.					No
Roposo	Roposo is an Indian video-sharing social media service, owned by Glance, a subsidiary of InMobi. Roposo provides a space where users can share posts related to different topics like food, comedy, music, poetry, fashion and travel.	Yes	Yes			No
Socialcam	Socialcam was a mobile social video application for iPhone, Android and Windows Phone, that was launched March 7, 2011 and ended October 28 2015 and was well known for the following functionality: applying filters to video, applying themes and soundtracks to video, and smooth integration with Facebook..					No
TikTok	TikTok, (formerly, Musical.ly), is a video social network app for video creation, messaging, and live broadcasting.	Yes	Yes		Yes	No
Ustream	Ustream is an app for live-streaming.	Yes	Yes			No
Vine	Vine was a download-only short-form video hosting service where users could share six-second-long looping video clips.	Yes	Yes	Yes		No
WallaMe	WallaMe users can take a picture of a surface, then write, draw and add stickers and photos to the image. Once the Wall message is completed, it is geolocalized, remaining visible through WallaMe's AR viewer by those passing by (virtually).	Yes	Yes			No
Watermarkremover.io	Watermarkremover.io is a website and app which inpaints images to remove watermarks using generative AI.	Yes			Yes	No
Snapseed	Snapseed is a photo-editing application for iOS and Android that enables users to enhance photos and apply digital filters. It was created by Nik Software, and is now owned by Google.	Yes	Yes			No
