= Solina Chau =

Chinese business executive

Solina Chau Hoi-shuen
- 周凱旋
- Born: July 1961 (age 65)
- Citizenship: Hong Kong; British
- Education: University of New South Wales
- Occupation: Cofounder Horizons Ventures

Chinese name
- Traditional Chinese: 周凱旋
- Simplified Chinese: 周凯旋
Transcriptions
Standard Mandarin
- Hanyu Pinyin: Zhōu Kǎixuán
Yue: Cantonese
- Jyutping: Zau1 Hoi2 Syun4

Solina Holly Chau Hoi Shuen (Chinese: 周凱旋; born July 1961) is a Hong Kong billionaire investor, businesswoman, and philanthropist. She is a close associate of Li Ka-shing, having co-founded Li-backed venture capital firm Horizon Ventures in 2002, serving as director of the Li Ka Shing Foundation, and being a business associate of his conglomerate Cheung Kong Holdings. Her major investments include shareholding in Tom.com and ChromaDex.

== Early life and education ==
Chau was born in 1961 to a British Hong Kong small-time businessman. She attended the prestigious Diocesan Girls' School in British Hong Kong, where she was elected junior house captain. She sat the Hong Kong Certificate of Education Examination in 1978 and graduated in 1979. She went on to continue her education in Sydney, Australia at the University of New South Wales.

== Career ==
After living in Australia, Chau lived and worked in London for a short period of time in the 1980s. During the late 1980s, she befriended Debbie Chang Pui Vee, who would eventually become one of her longest running business partners.

Chau's first notable achievement within Hong Kong business circles was winning a project to build the Oriental Square in downtown Beijing in 1993. This project and many others during her early career were accomplished in collaboration with former Hong Kong chief executive Tung Chee-hwa, Debbie Chang's cousin. Chau also met Li Ka-shing around this time, and the two would later become known for their close companionship and various business partnerships.

In 1999, with Li's help, Chau set up Tom, a Chinese language media company, as a Cayman Island registered limited company as a minority (40%) partner together with Hutchison Whampoa and Cheung Kong Holdings in a series of transactions which netted her an estimated US$11 million in cash even before the company began to trade. When Tom was listed on the Hong Kong Stock Exchange, Chau's investment in Tom grew to UCS$1.63 billion, making her the second-richest woman in Hong Kong at the time.

In 2002, Chau invested RMB ¥ 1 million into an interactive voice-recognition service provider, Beijing Leitingwuji Network Technology Company Limited (北京雷霆无极网络科技有限公司). In September 2003, before the company was even profitable, she sold it to TOM Group for the sum of US$132 million. Its subsidiary TOM Online was then separately listed on the Growth Enterprise Market of the Hong Kong Stock Exchange in early 2004. Chau remained a 9.998% shareholder in Tom Online until 12 March 2007, when Tom Group announced an offer for the outstanding shares in Tom Online, to take the company private. Chau also has a 24% stake in TOM Group prior to the announcement.

In 2002, Chau cofounded Horizons Ventures with Debbie Chang, who is the only person named as a director. Li Ka-shing only became an investor in the firm two years after its founding, but his backing as the richest man in Asia has helped the firm stand out above the crowd. Under Chau, Horizons Ventures has invested over US$470 million in more than 80 tech companies, in search of "disruptive" tech entrepreneurs. Its primary investments have been in the United States and Israel, with at least 28 investments in each country respectively since 2006.

Under her leadership, Horizons Ventures has made significant investments in global technology companies such as Zoom Video Communications, Celsius Holdings, and Canada's Well Health Technologies. These investments have substantially contributed to her personal fortune.

Chau has personally stated that her business interests center around nurturing Western companies, viewing them as more innovative. Chau has been noted to invest in companies very quickly, sometimes within 24 hours of startup owners, or immediately after a short coffee meeting. Chau typically brings investments ranging anywhere from $1 million to $20 million to the table. Horizons was incorporated in Hong Kong in 2006. With her direction, the Li Ka-shing foundation has also invested in tech giants such as Facebook, Slack, and Spotify.

She was named one of Forbes Asia's 50 Women in the Mix in 2013. In 2023, she ranked 81st in the Forbes list of "World's 100 most powerful women".

== Philanthropy ==
Between September and November 2024, through her H.S. Chau Foundation, Chau distributed HK$3,300 (approximately US$424) cash handouts to more than 10,000 low-income individuals in Hong Kong, aiming to alleviate financial hardships during challenging times.

== Personal life ==
Chau is well known for her decades long friendship with Hong Kong billionaire Li Ka-Shing, whom she met through a mutual friend in the 1990s. Li is 33 years her senior and is Chau's closest confidant, and the pair have backed and advised each other through many of their projects. Chau has been seen kneeling down in public to tie Li's shoelaces and hold his umbrella in the rain. Chau has compared their relationship to that of Sancho Panza and Don Quixote.

In March 2026, Chau and Li were reported as appearing in the Epstein list. The two had been in contact with Ian Osborne, who served as a liaison to Jeffrey Epstein and emailed him regarding investing in the Hedosophia capital fund.

=== Legal issues ===
In 2012, Chau sued the Hong Kong-based distributor of Beijing-based Caijing under accusations of defamation after the magazine claimed Chau had accepted bribes from a mainland government official to fast track a construction project. Mainland courts ruled in December 2012 that Beijin Caijing Magazine Limited was liable for defamation and ordered the company to publish an apology. Chau's camp accepted these terms.
