= Gapo (disambiguation) =

Gapo is a Vietnamese social networking service.

GAPO or Gapo may also refer to:

== Places ==
- Gapo-dong (Korean: 가포동, lit. 'Gapo Ward'), Masan, Changwon, Gyeongsang, South Korea
- Gapo Tunnel, and, Gapo Interchange, and, Gapo Road; in Changwon, Gyeongsang, South Korea; on National Route 2 (South Korea)
- Korem 044/Garuda Dempo (Gapo), South Sumatra, Sumatra Island, Indonesia; a military district of the Kodam II/Sriwijaya regional military command
- Olongapo (nicknamed: Gapo), Central Luzon, Luzon Island, Philippines; a city
- Gapo, Daraga, Albay, Bicol, Luzon Island, Philippines; a barangay
- Gapó, Penalva, Maranhão, Northeast Region, Brazil; a quilombola community, see List of quilombola communities in Brazil

== People ==
- Branko Gapo, a Macedonian director; see List of films from North Macedonia
- Vladimir Gašparić Gapo, an artist featured at the Modern Gallery, Zagreb, Croatia

== Groups, organizations ==
- NASA General Aviation Program Office (GAPO), NASA Langley Research Center; see Advanced General Aviation Transport Experiments

== Arts, entertainment, media ==
- 'GAPÔ, a 1988 Tagalog-language Philippine novel by Lualhati Bautista
- Gapo, a drama TV show from 1994 in Philippine television that was aired on Radio Philippines Network

== Science, mathematics, logic, medicine, engineering, technology ==
- GAPO syndrome, an autosomal recessive disorder
- ANTXR1 (anthrax toxin receptor 1), a transmembrane protein and gene, also called GAPO
- Great prismated octaexon (gapo), otherwise known as the runcicantitruncated 7-simplex

== Other uses ==
- Gapo Dollar, a currency used in Post-WW2 Gaudiopolis, Budapest, Hungary

== See also ==
- "Gapos", 2019 season 3 episode 88 number 244 of the Philippine TV drama show Precious Hearts Romances Presents: Los Bastardos; see 2019 Los Bastardos season 3
