= Cinderela Baiana =

1998 film directed by Conrado Sanchez

- VHS cover
- Directed by: Conrado Sanchez
- Screenplay by: Conrado Sanchez (uncredited)
- Produced by: Antônio Polo Galante
- Starring: Carla Perez; Perry Salles; Alexandre Pires; Lázaro Ramos; Lucci Ferreira; Armindo Bião; Juliana Calil
- Cinematography: Conrado Sanchez
- Edited by: Éder Mazini
- Production companies: Itanhandu Produções Cinema e Vídeo Ltda. Galateia Produções Ltda.
- Distributed by: PlayArte
- Release date: September 4, 1998
- Running time: 85 minutes
- Country: Brazil
- Language: Portuguese

Cinderela Baiana (Note: The film's opening credits misspell the title as Cinderela Bahiana.) (Portuguese for Bahian Cinderella) is a 1998 Brazilian semi-fictionalized biographical romantic comedy film directed by Conrado Sanchez (who also wrote the screenplay, even though he was uncredited for it) and produced by Antônio Polo Galante (his last credited work prior to his retirement in the same year). It is a heavily fictionalized biography of dancer Carla Perez, famous for being a former member of axé group É o Tchan!. The film is noted for being the debuts of Perez, then-unknown actors Lázaro Ramos and Lucci Ferreira, and musician Alexandre Pires (frontman of samba group Só Pra Contrariar and Carla Perez's then-boyfriend) on a feature film, and also counts with cameos by singers Netinho and Cátia Guimma, portraying themselves.

Released in theaters on September 4, 1998, Cinderela Baiana was a critical and commercial failure, and to this day it is considered to be one of the worst films ever made by the Brazilian film industry.

== Plot ==
Carla Perez (portrayed by Carla Fabianny as a child and by herself as an adult) lives with her father Raimundo (Armindo Bião) and unnamed tuberculous mother (Juliana Calil) in a small, poor shack located somewhere in the middle of the sertão of Bahia. After her mother dies, Carla and her father decide to move to Salvador in order to achieve better life conditions. Carla, having an innate talent for dancing, soon is spotted by eccentric talent manager Pierre (Perry Salles) and his personal assistant Beto (Val Perré); she is initially enthusiastic about her newly acquired fame, but soon discovers Pierre is an unscrupulous man that is only interested into the profits of exploiting her. Helped by her two vagabond friends, Bucha (Lucci Ferreira) and Chico (Lázaro Ramos), and by her boyfriend, Alexandre Pires (portrayed by himself), she garners the strength to fight Pierre back and live freely as she wishes.

== Production ==
Filming began in June 1998 in the cities of Salvador and Milagres, Bahia.

== Critical reception ==
The film was reviled by critics and the public alike, who criticized Carla Perez's lackluster and amateurish performance, the clichéd plot, several narrative inconsistencies and Perry Salles' ridiculously over-the-top acting as Pierre. It holds a score of 2.2 out of 10 at the Internet Movie Database and of 2 out of 5 at Filmow, based on 1,146 votes (as of March 2018). Carla Perez announced in 2008 that she had disowned the film, saying that she "regretted it as an actress", and by her request it was ultimately withdrawn from circulation a couple of years after its release; thus being, original physical copies of the film are extremely rare and very difficult to obtain. However, it has found its way to survive via file-sharing websites, being uploaded in its entirety to YouTube on January 30, 2013. The film has acquired a small cult following, with excerpts of it being widely used as a source for YouTube Poops in Brazil. According to researcher Arthur Autran, the film sold a little over 50,000 VHS copies prior to its recall.

On March 15, 2010, Brazilian magazine Veja made a list of the top 10 worst Brazilian films of all time, and Cinderela Baiana was featured in first place. The list's author, Pollyane Lima e Silva, stated: "[T]he idea of giving an axé dancer (it doesn't matter how 'good' people think she is) a biopic was plain wrong since its inception". She also referred to the movie as being "cringeworthy".

Brazilian writer, blogger and film critic Renzo Mora included Cinderela Baiana in his 2009 book 25 Filmes que Podem Arruinar a Sua Vida! (English: 25 Films That Might Ruin Your Life!). Commenting about it, he wrote that "it was the worst one among the other 24".

In December 2015, "fans" of the film started a humorous petition for it to be streamed by Netflix. As of February 2016, it has proven to be unsuccessful.

Despite the film's overwhelmingly negative reception, Lázaro Ramos stated on a 2015 interview that he "doesn't regret taking part in it" and that thanks to the salary he received, he was able to quit his day job as a pathology laboratory technician and pay for acting lessons.

On August 7, 2016, the film was featured in 12th place on a list of the top 20 worst movies of all time made by Brazilian newspaper O Estado de S. Paulo, and in 2018 it appeared in first place in the list of the "three best worst Brazilian movies" by magazine Superinteressante.
