= Styloko =

- Company type: Private
- Website type: Social E-commerce
- Available in: English
- Founded: London (2010)
- No. of locations: Offices in London; Sofia; Moscow
- Key people: Shannon Edwards, CEO; Ivailo Jordanov, Director/Co-founder; Yury Tereshchenko, Director/Co-founder
- Industry: Fashion
- Website: www.styloko.com (Redirects to: www.endource.com/women/clothing)
- Advertising: Affiliate marketing
- Current status: Not Active

Styloko was a fashion discovery engine based in London.

== Background ==
The site was launched in 2010 by founding entrepreneurs Ivailo Jordanov and Yury Tereshchenko, who also founded 23Snaps. Jordanov was formerly an executive at search engine marketing company Espotting. The CEO as of 2014 is Shannon Edwards.

Monty Munford wrote on Forbes.com about the site: "With each visit, a customer’s shopping experience becomes more personal, thanks to the data being collected in the background." He also commented in Huffington Post: "Enter Styloko, the social shopping site that gives women access to an online store built especially for them."

Based on the concept of social and discovery commerce, users can follow brands, other style-setters, and curate their own shopping space. The site offers price and product tracking capabilities to enable users to receive sale alerts when items go on sale or back in stock. Styloko has an app for iOS which includes GPS technology, with plans to launch on Android in 2015. The company launched their US-focused site in 2014.

The Styloko Board Advisors include Miriam Lahage, Bay Garnett, and Brett Putter.

== WantList ==
In 2015, Styloko launched an iOS application, The WantList. The app allows shoppers to pick up where they last left off while shopping and uses the popular app gestures of swiping right for items of interest and swiping left for items the shopper isn't interested in purchasing. WantList also learns user preferences and enables them to find less expensive alternatives to popular items via the "Luxe or Less" feature.

== Reception ==
In 2012, Styloko appointed Emily O’Brien as Editor-in-Chief, and was named one of the best fashion and beauty websites by The Independent later that year.

In 2013, it was voted 8/10 in a road test of the best fashion apps and websites by Metro.
