= TOM Online =

Chinese telecommunications company

- Website type: Web portal
- Available in: Chinese
- Website: tom.com
- Commercial: Yes
- Launched: June 1997

TOM Online is a mobile Internet company in China, operating the popular Chinese-language Internet portal (www.tom.com) and offering a variety of online and mobile services, including wireless internet and online advertising. It is a subsidiary of the TOM Group, controlled by Li Ka Shing.

The company, then named TOM.com, was first listed on the Growth Enterprise Market on March 1, 2000, and on the NASDAQ on March 10, 2004. It set a record in Hong Kong when it listed: shares closed at 3.35 times its offer price on the first day of trade.

Tom Group, which owned 66 percent of the company, announced in March 2007 that it would pay HK$1.57 billion to buy out minority shareholders in the company, valuing each share at HK$1.52. A vote on the deal was scheduled for June 8, but was postponed to August 10. Morgan Stanley said in a report in March that the fair value for Tom Online would be HK$1.90 per share. The delay in the vote was seen by an analyst that the company was "not confident about getting approval from majority shareholders for the deal... The general feedback in the market is that the price suggested is quite low."

The company has since been taken private.

TOM Online exclusively offers the Chinese version of Skype, which has been modified for the Chinese market and seems to include a text filter for political keywords.
