= RoundMe =

- Original author: Konstantin Andreev
- Developer: Roundme Limited
- Initial release: 17 June 2014; 11 years ago
- Operating system: Web, iOS, Android
- Available in: English
- Type: Entertainment, Photo and video
- License: Freeware
- Website: roundme.com

RoundMe was a virtual tour application which allowed users to create, upload and share 360 degree panoramic photos and multimedia content of real spaces, that users could visit virtually using Google Cardboard or any VR headsets. The app was available on the web, iOS and Android. Roundme was positioned as one of the Best New Apps in the iTunes App Store in 58 countries in 2015. Roundme raised a $3 million round led by April Capital in 2015. The company was also hosting spaces for brands including National Library of Belarus and American Airlines.

== History ==
RoundMe was founded in June 2012 by Konstantin Andreev. It was officially released on June 17, 2014. It was headquartered in Los Angeles, California. Konstantin Andreev served as CEO.

In January 2023, RoundMe was discontinued.

== See also ==
- Giphy
- Instagram
- Flickr
- Vine
- Bazaart
