= Gábor Sztehlo =

Hungarian Lutheran pastor (1909–1974)

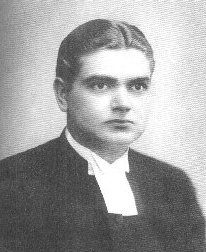
Sztehlo Gábor (1909 – 1974)

Gábor Sztehlo (1909–1974) was a Lutheran Pastor in Budapest who saved Jewish children from persecution by the Nazis and the fascist Hungarian Arrow Cross Party during World War II.

Sztehlo was born November 25, 1909, in Budapest and studied theology in Sopron. Starting in 1932 he served as a chaplain in Budapest, then later in Hatvan and Nagytarcsa. In 1937 he founded the first Hungarian adult education center in Nagytarcsa, the beginnings of the Folk College System, inspired by his experiences in Finland. He later returned to Budapest prior to the German invasion of Hungary in 1944.

Jozsef Èliás led the Good Shepherd Committee, which was founded in October 1942 by converted Jews. This organization provided food and clothing for Jews conscripted into forced labor. Bishop Sándor Raffay appointed Gábor to represent the Lutheran Church in the committee, which he later led after Èliás was forced to go into hiding. Working with the International Red Cross and the Lutheran Church, the Committee helped find homes for Jewish children and provided papers stating that they had converted to Christianity, setting up 32 children's hospices across Budapest. It is estimated that between 1,540 and 2,000 children and 400 adults were saved from persecution before the war ended.

After the liberation of Budapest in October, 1945, Sztehlo founded Gaudiopolis, a self-declared "children's republic" for both Jewish and non-Jewish children while working with the Red Cross to find homes and support for them. Gaudiopolis was nationalized in 1950. Gábor stayed in Budapest to organize hospices for the handicapped and elderly, amongst other social work. After the Hungarian Revolution of 1956, his family moved to Switzerland, where he joined them in 1961. In 1972 Sztehlo was recognized by Yad Vashem as being "Righteous Among the Nations", the first Hungarian to receive the title. He died from a heart attack on May 28, 1974, in Interlaken, Switzerland.

In 1991 former students and coworkers established the Gábor Sztehlo Foundation for the Help of Children and Adolescents. In 2009 a memorial to Sztehlo, created by the sculptor Tamás Vigh, was erected facing the Deák Square Lutheran Church in Budapest.

== Bibliography ==
- Sztehlo, Gábor (1994). In the Hands of God. Gabor Sztehlo Foundation. ISBN 978-9630441483.
