= Jappy =

German social networking service

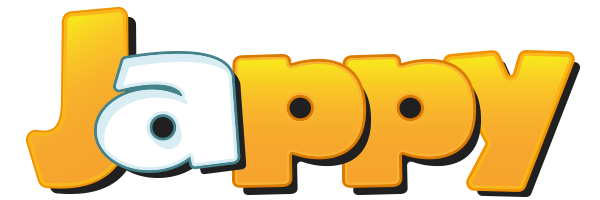
- Website type: Social networking
- Available in: English and German
- Owner: Jappy GmbH
- Website: www.jappy.com
- Commercial: Yes
- Registration: Yes
- Launched: 15 January 2001
- Current status: Active

Jappy is a German social networking service. It was founded in June 2001 and sees itself as a "network for friends." Membership comes from all areas of Germany, but there is a focus on the metropolitan areas. Until 2011, Jappy was only available in German. It was made available in English in June 2011. In March 2013, Jappy was the 16th most used social media in Germany with 1.5 million active users. According to the company, there were around 240,000 registered users in early October 2018. 230,000 registered users were reported in January 2019.

== History ==
In 2001, a business student named Matthias Vogl and an electrical engineering student named Christian Wimmer founded an online dating service under the name Singletreffen.net. A year later the website was renamed to Jappy.tv, followed by Jappy.de three years after that. The name Jappy comes from the pseudonym of a former editor of the German magazine Simplicissimus. In 2006, the network acquired over 100,000 members and was converted into a GmbH by the owners. In November 2008, Jappy reached one million members and reached more than 2.5 billion page views in one month. The company has been located in Hauzenberg in Landkreis Prassau since 2007. On June 15, 2011, Jappy celebrated its 10th birthday.

The website is financed by advertising. According to Comscore Admetrix in April 2011, Jappy was in the top 3 companies for ad impressions in Germany.

Version V4 came out in the Fall of 2011. It was a revision and introduced new features but also restricted some features of the old version.

On August 12, 2015, a new version of Jappy was presented with a simplified design to equate the desktop and mobile versions.

== Features ==
Registration is required to use the network. The members give a nickname instead of a real name when registering. Since February 2010, it has been possible to enter one's real first and last name in addition to the nickname and to display it on the profile depending on the privacy settings. Since November 2012, only the first name has been requested and is only displayed on request or by settings.

Initially, there were various features for members to use such as tickers, groups, guest books, and a mail system. A user could also design their personal profile with welcome text, pictures, and sub-pages. Each member also had the opportunity to activate a flirting option. Most of these options have now been gradually abolished, only guest books and up to ten profile pictures are now still possible. Using a virtual currency, called Jappy Credits, other users can virtually send emoticons and gifts.

In addition to a mobile version of the platform, there is also the Jappy Messenger app for iOS and Android.

In March 2009, Stern.de referred to Jappy as a "visual adventure", "kitsch universe", and "parallel universe of society" due to the "accumulation of kitschy greeting cards."

Der Spiegel found in April 2011 that "every platform has its own profile and its own reputation" and described Jappy, compared to other social platforms, as "more of a liberal contact exchange."

== Users ==
The platform is accessible to users aged 16 and over. Jappy generally does do age verification. For all registered users that have their age set to between 16 and 18 years, the contact filter is preset when registering. The contact filter prevents contacting users over age 20.

The members were looked after by around 200 volunteer moderators at the beginning of 2017, and since then the team has shrunk to a few full-time moderators. The moderation team was divided into groups focusing on users, games, groups, child protection, and ambassadors.

Spiegel Online referred to the internet community of Jappy.de, with 1.9 million members at the time of reporting, as a "relatively small" network compared to the VZ networks, but noted that its users were "very active."

An evaluation of the site by the industry magazine Meedia.de in February 2011 showed that Jappy was in the top 10 of German social networks in Germany and was at the top of the list in terms of the time users stayed per visit. The Internet market research institute ComScore confirmed the length of stay time in August 2011. Jappy.de took second place, coming before Facebook.

After a study conducted by the statistics portal Statista in August 2012, Jappy was no longer one of the ten most popular social networks in Germany. In March 2013, Jappy was 16th place in popularity for social networks in Germany.

== Data Security ==
In March 2010, Stiftung Warentest, a data protection firm, examined the data protection of a total of ten German-speaking social networks with more than 100,000 visitors per day. During this investigation, a security vulnerability was discovered in Jappy, through which attackers could gain access to other user accounts using "simple means: a computer and a simple, self-developed software." According to Jappy, the "data security has since been changed." Overall, Jappy ranked third in the ranking with the assessment of "significant deficiencies."

On the evening of November 5, 2013, one or more attackers managed to access Jappy's database. The usernames, email addresses, birth dates, and passwords of users were acquired from this breach.

== See also ==
- List of social networking services
