= HeiaHeia =

Social wellbeing application

- Website type: Wellbeing & health platform
- Headquarters: Finland
- Owner: HeiaHeia Oy (Ltd)
- Website: www.heiaheia.com
- Commercial: Yes
- Registration: Required
- Current status: Active

HeiaHeia is a social wellbeing application developed by HeiaHeia Ltd. It is designed to keep a journal of one’s physical activity and well being, setting personal targets and cheering on one’s friends. Activities are logged using the app and by connecting the app with a wearable (e.g. Garmin, Apple Watch, Fitbit, Polar, or Suunto). Users can log more than 600 different activities. HeiaHeia is available as both a free app and a paid version for organizations, such as employers.

== App for personal wellbeing ==
The philosophy underpinning HeiaHeia is “casual wellbeing”, which refers to applying a social and fun approach to encouraging all kinds of people, regardless of their age or activity level, to take care of their wellbeing on their own terms. The app is available in more than 10 languages, and it has users in more than 150 countries, representing virtually all age groups.

According to HeiaHeia’s own user surveys, more than 70% of users improve their wellbeing by e.g. increasing their physical activity. As a social app, it also increases the sense of belonging and team spirit in work communities and other organizations. The impact of HeiaHeia has also been documented by scientific research.

== Solutions for employers and health providers ==
Employers and other organizations in dozens of countries have adopted HeiaHeia as a platform for wellbeing programs and challenges.

The customer base of HeiaHeia has multiplied as the result of COVID-19 pandemic.

HeiaHeia cooperates closely with several health and wellbeing providers, both private and public. Employers can complement HeiaHeia with services and digital content from these partners.

HeiaHeia is also used in group coaching of fitness and rehabilitation groups, as well as e.g. in schools. In the city of Vantaa, HeiaHeia is the digital platform used in lifestyle mentoring for people with various health conditions. The outcomes of this health intervention were presented e.g. at the Garmin Health Summit in 2021.

In spring 2020 the company signed an 8-year frame agreement concerning the deployment of its digital health and wellbeing platform with Tiera, the ICT service provider of Finnish municipalities.

== Background ==
The founders developed the app initially for their own use, to keep a shared training journal while living in different parts of the world. Later, they began to develop a business based on the service. The original HeiaHeia merged with Hintsa Performance in 2015 and invested heavily into e.g. developing the platform and digital solutions.

The founding team of the new HeiaHeia Ltd. acquired the HeiaHeia business and technology from Hintsa Performance in the beginning of 2020, and has since developed the technology and business in order to respond to high customer demand and especially the needs of remote work.

The company is based in Helsinki, Finland and is fully owned by the entrepreneur team.

== Trivia ==
The name of the service originates from the Scandinavian (Norwegian) cheer “Heia! Heia!” often heard at skiing competitions.

== See also ==
- List of social networking websites
