= Dan Serfaty =

French entrepreneur and businessman (born 1966)

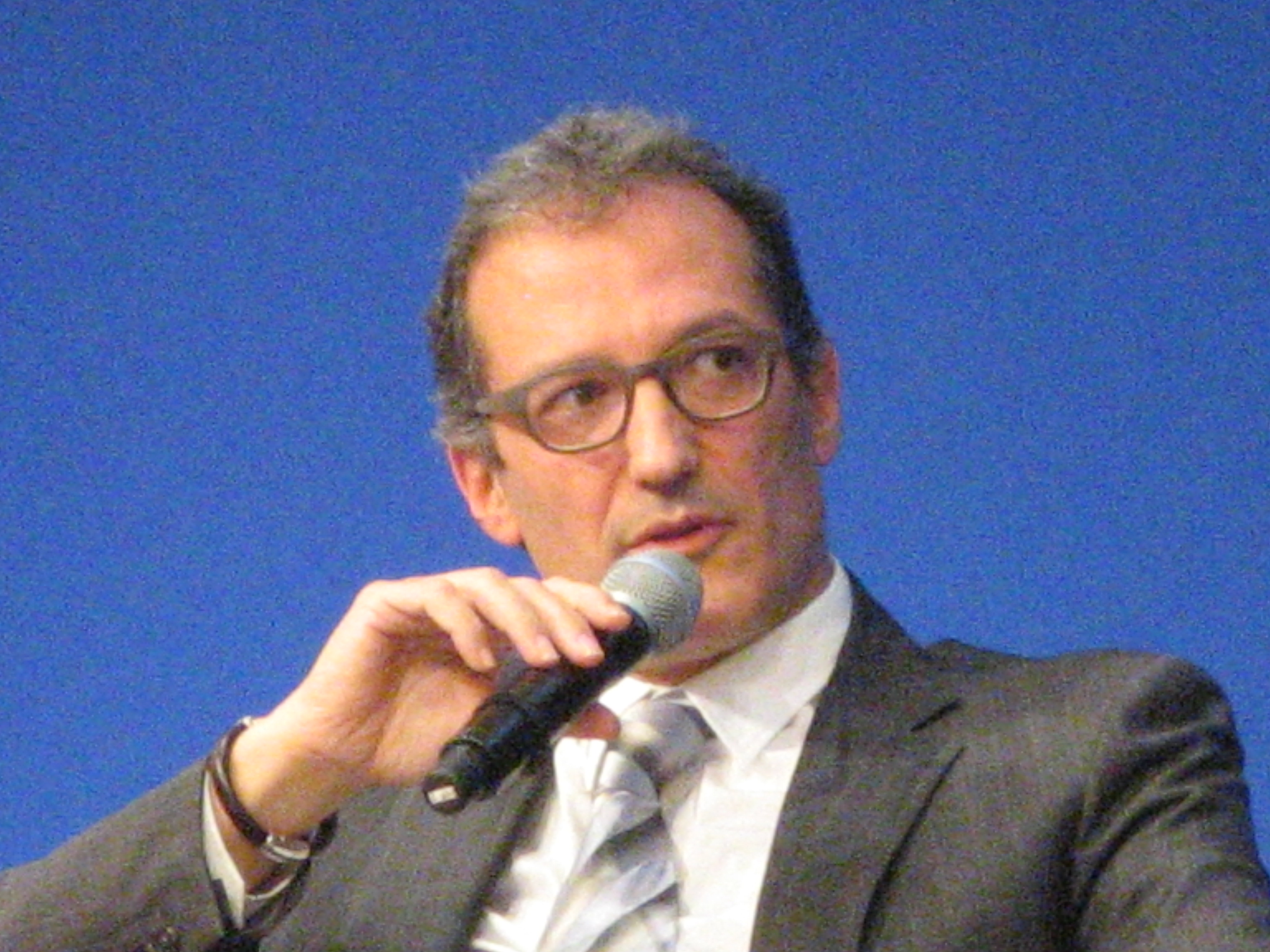
- Serfaty in 2014
- Born: 5 February 1966 (age 60); Strasbourg, France
- Education: HEC Paris
- Occupations: entrepreneur and businessman
- Known for: co-founded Viadeo

Dan Serfaty (born February 5, 1966, in Strasbourg, France) is a French entrepreneur and businessman.

He is best known as the former co-founder and CEO of Viadeo, a professional social network.

== Biography ==
After graduating from HEC Paris Entrepreneurship program in 1987, Serfaty spent 2 years abroad before starting his entrepreneurial life. In 1989, he acquired a company in the tourism sector, which he successfully turned profitable before selling it in 1991.

At the same time, he co-founded a company specializing in the distribution of imported clothing products from Asia, which he sold 10 years later.

In 2000, he founded Agregator, a club dedicated to entrepreneurs, aimed at facilitating the sharing of experiences, ideas, and contacts among its members. Uniquely, most of Agregator's members were the CEOs of small companies financed by venture capital, providing them with liquidity and private equity returns.

The Agregator experience was the context where Dan developed the idea for a business-oriented social network, while working originally on some software that would allow club members to access each other's contacts.

In 2004, along with Thierry Lunati, he co-founded Viaduc–the original name of Viadeo–investing a portion of the first 5 million euros raised for Agregator. By 2006, Viaduc rebranded as Viadeo, signaling the company's ambition for global expansion, which included the launch of its English and Italian versions. Today, with over 60 million users worldwide, Viadeo stands as the second-largest professional social network.

In 2007, Viadeo expanded into China with the acquisition of Tianji.com, a local social networking site counting 1.3 million users at that time. Tianji.com rapidly grew its user base, reaching 8 million in 2011.

In January 2016, after a failed attempt to conquer international markets, Dan Serfaty left the company which was taken over by Le Figaro. In the same year, he founded Artur'In.

Beginning 2020, Dan became the Co-President of Keren Hayessod France, a charity aiming at reducing the social fracture in Israel. A few months later, Dan also joined the Board of Governors of the Jewish Agency for Israel
