= Pixnet =

Taiwanese social media service

PIXNET
- Company type: Private
- Website type: Social networking service
- Available in: Multilingual
- Founded: 2003
- Headquarters: {{{location_country}}}
- Country of origin: Taiwan
- Owner: PIXNET Digital Media
- Industry: Internet
- Website: pixnet.net
- Advertising: Native
- Launched: 2003; 23 years ago
- Current status: Active

Pixnet (Chinese: 痞客邦; pinyin: Pǐkè bāng) is a Taiwanese mobile photo sharing, blogging, and social networking service, started in 2003, that enables its users to store pictures or create blogs and share them either publicly or privately on its website. The service is also available as an application, PIXNET is available at the App Store and the Google Play Store. The service has a large user following in Taiwan, but access to it is blocked in China.

== History ==
PIXNET was started in 2003 as an online photo hosting service for students, and over time evolved into a social network. In 2007 it received financial backing from the Hong Kong–based TOM Group. This backing supported the site's hosting by Amazon Web Services in order for it to grow; AWS processes over 10 million pictures every day.

== See also ==
- Instagram
- Flickr
- Spaces
- ImageShack
