= Viadeo =

Social networking service

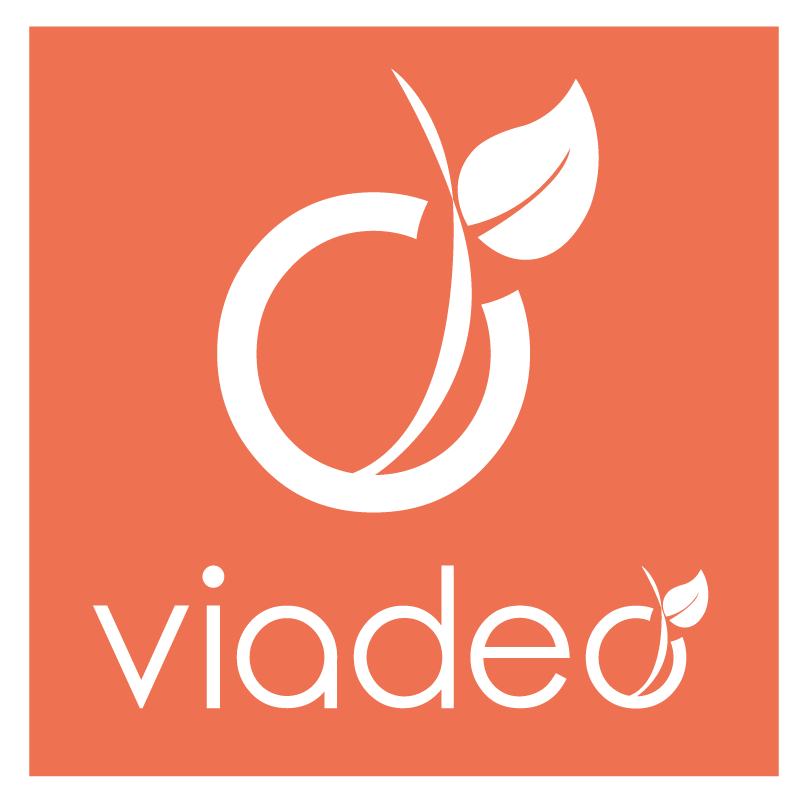
- Company type: Public
- Website type: Professional network service
- Available in: English, French, German, Italian, Portuguese, Spanish, Russian
- Founded: Paris, France
- Area served: Worldwide
- Founders: Dan Serfaty, Thierry Lunati
- Revenue: $40 million (2009 estimation)
- Employees: 400
- Website: www.viadeo.com
- Commercial: Yes
- Registration: Required
- Launched: May 2004; Paris
- Current status: Active

Viadeo is a Web 2.0 professional social network whose members include business owners, entrepreneurs and managers. Viadeo was often compared to LinkedIn, offering free access but not being able to compete with the larger corporation. As of 2014, the site had 65 million members.

== Company information ==
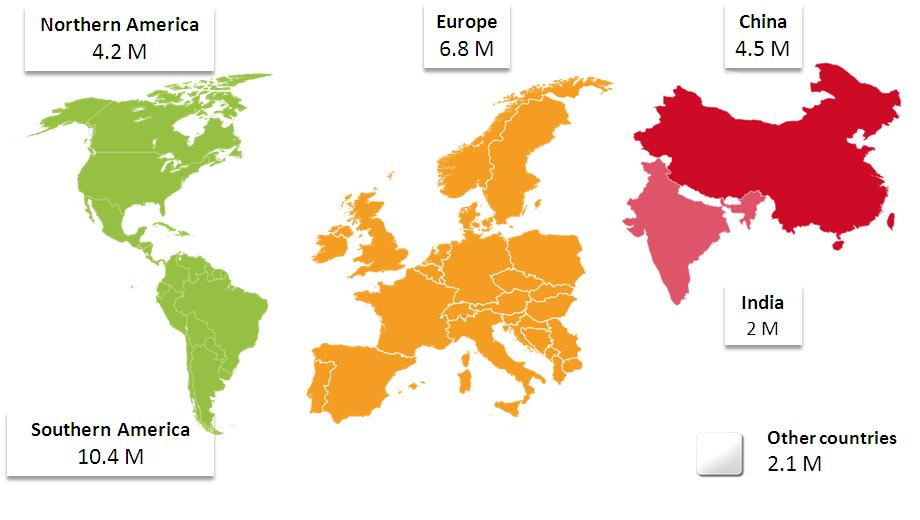
Viadeo usage by continent in 2010

Viadeo was founded under its original name, Viaduc, in May 2004 by Dan Serfaty, a graduate of the HEC School of Management in Paris, and Thierry Lunati, a graduate of École centrale Paris. The name was changed to Viadeo in November 2006.

From November 2006 to August 2007, Viadeo raised €5 million twice in funding from investors AGF Private Equity and Ventech. Later that year, Viadeo announced the acquisition of Tianji.com, a Chinese business social network.

Six months after purchasing Tianji, in July 2008 Viadeo acquired its Spanish competitor ICTnet. Launched in 1995, ICTnet had 300,000 members and is popular in South America.

In early 2009, Viadeo acquired the Indian professional social networks services, ApnaCircle. ApnaCircle, with 300,000 members at the time of the acquisition, was founded by Yogesh Bansal and later joined by Sabeer Bhatia, co-founder of Hotmail, as board member.

On 13 October 2009, Viadeo announced the acquisition of the Canadian contact management website, unyk.com. At the time, unyk had 16 million members around the world, and this made Viadeo second only to its main competitor LinkedIn in terms of total membership.

The company is headquartered in Paris, and employs a global staff of 450, with offices in London, Madrid, Barcelona, Milan, Beijing, New Delhi, Mexico City, Montreal, and San Francisco. In 2009, Viadeo had estimated annual turnover of $40 million and is profitable since last quarter of 2009.

In August 2015, Viadeo announced they had engaged in an advertising campaign in France to promote a 'new vision' and that the member base had passed the 10 million mark in France.

In 2016, after a failed attempt to conquer international markets, the company was taken over by Le Figaro.

== Partnerships ==
- Google OpenSocial: Viadeo is a partner since its launch in 2007
- IBM Lotus Notes: Viadeo is available for professionals using IBM Lotus Notes
- Microsoft Outlook Connector: Viadeo is available on Outlook.

== See also ==
- LinkedIn
- Business network
- Reputation systems
- Social network
- List of social networking websites
