= TOM Group =

TOM Group Limited (SEHK: 2383) is a technology and media listed on the Main Board of the Stock Exchange of Hong Kong. TOM Group's technology platform and investment-related businesses encompass mobile Internet, e-commerce, fintech and advanced data analytics sectors. In addition, its media operations include publishing and advertising. Headquartered in Hong Kong, the Group has regional headquarters in Beijing and Taipei. TOM Group is a member of CK Hutchison Holdings Limited.

== History ==
The TOM Group was founded in October 1999 as a joint venture between Cheung Kong–Hutchison Group, Solina Chau and other investors. In March 2000, it was listed on the Growth Enterprise Market (ticker symbol: 8001). The Group has subsequently transferred its listing to the Main Board of the Stock Exchange of Hong Kong (ticker symbol: 2383).

== Operations ==
Headquartered in Hong Kong, the Group has regional offices in Beijing and Shanghai with approximately 1,200 employees.

== Technology ==
In 2007, TOM Group's publishing arm, Cite Media stepped into digitalization by riding on the established social networking site, Pixnet. Pixnet is the largest user-generated content platform in Taiwan, focusing on sharing information on food, travel, beauty & style, 3C, and movies.

In June 2014, TOM group also invested in a Hong Kong fintech player, WeLab, which is a company that operates online lending platforms in Hong Kong, China and Indonesia.

In March 2020, TOM Group invested in MioTech. MioTech leverages artificial intelligence and big data technologies to tackle sustainability and social responsibility challenges facing financial institutions, corporations, and individuals, such as climate change, carbon emission reduction and corporate governance.

== Publishing ==
TOM Group publishing arm has developed into a publishing platform in Greater China. In Taiwan, a total of 40 publishers are consolidated under Cite Publishing Holding Group. Over 60 magazine titles with annual printing volume exceeding 29 million copies; a total of 5 new magazines on computer, digital related and lifestyle genres were launched. More than 2,000 new book titles; and the annual printing volume reached to 19 million copies; a total catalogue of 14,000 titles out of which 400 more were licensed for local production by publishers in Mainland China.
