= Influenster =

Product discovery and reviews platform

- Company type: Private
- Website type: Product reviews
- Available in: English
- Headquarters: New York City, United States
- Area served: US, Canada
- Owner: Bazaarvoice
- Founders: Aydin Acar; Elizabeth Scherle
- Key people: Aydin Acar (CEO); Elizabeth Scherle (President)
- Website: influenster.com
- Registration: Optional
- Launched: 2010
- Current status: Active

Influenster is a product discovery and reviews platform owned by the software company Bazaarvoice. Users review consumer products and may be sent samples in exchange for reviews and social media posts. Influenster launched in 2010. An iOS app for Influenster launched in 2014 while an Android app launched in 2015. Influenster was acquired by Bazaarvoice in August 2019, at which point it had close to six million members who had written more than 38 million product reviews. The app was relaunched in October 2022, and Bazaarvoice describes the platform as having more than nine million members.

== Features ==
Influenster has a platform consisting of over 11 million reviews, with 880,000 new reviews generated each month. These products represent over 100K consumer brands with over 1.7 million product pages for users to review, ask/answer questions, and upload photos/videos of.

Based on a user's Impact score and supplied demographic information, they can be invited to Influenster campaigns. Influenster runs a variety of different types of campaigns, but they generally involve sending invited users a complimentary product or service to sample and discuss on social media. After sampling, the user is asked to complete a final market-research survey.

Influenster offers coupons and offers from partner retailers and brands that users can access through their product discovery experience on the platform. It uses Facebook, Twitter, Instagram, YouTube, Tumblr, Foursquare, Google+, a multi-platform blog widget, and friend referrals to determine Impact score. Impact points are largely calculated based on the number of followers or friends a user has on any given social network.

Influenster allows users to unlock "Expert" and "Lifestyle" badges through completing survey questions about their interests and behaviors, writing reviews on products, answering other users' questions, and sharing Influenster product pages across social media channels. These badges are a part of a gamification system to reward specific types of users with invites to specific Influenster campaigns matching their demographic.

== Business model ==
The primary business model for Influenster involves brands working with Influenster through sampling campaigns. In sampling campaigns, brands will offer complimentary products or digital rewards to Influenster users who meet brand and product-specific criteria.

== Series funding ==
In 2016, Influenster raised $8 million in financing from Ebates, a leading online cashback shopping service.

Bazaarvoice, a user-generated content software company based in Austin, Texas, acquired Influenster on August 28, 2019. Bazaarvoice said the acquisition combined Influenster's community with its own network of more than 6,000 brand and retailer websites. Co-founders Aydin Acar and Elizabeth Scherle remained with the business, and the combined offering was made available in North America immediately and in Europe later that year.

== See also ==
- Social Media Marketing
- Social Influence
- List of social networking websites
