= Perry Salles =

Brazilian actor (1939–2009)

- Born: Perilúcio José de Almeida; March 6, 1939; Rio de Janeiro, Brazil
- Died: June 17, 2009 (aged 70); Rio de Janeiro, Brazil
- Resting place: Caju Cemetery, Rio de Janeiro, Brazil
- Occupations: Film director, actor
- Years active: 1961–2005
- Spouses: Miriam Mehler (m. 1968; div. 1971) Vera Fischer (m. 1974; div. 1989)
- Children: 5
- Parent: Yara Salles (adoptive)

Perilúcio José de Almeida (March 6, 1939 – June 17, 2009), better known by his stage name Perry Salles, was a Brazilian film director and actor.

== Biography ==
Salles was born in Rio de Janeiro, on March 6, 1939, and was the adoptive son of actress Yara Salles. He began his acting career in 1961, portraying the character Fernando in the comedy film O Dono da Bola. His breakthrough was in the 1973 pornochanchada classic A Super Fêmea, where he met his future wife, Vera Fischer. Salles later acquired higher prominence after starring in the 1987 telenovela Mandala as Laio. Around the same time he directed the films Intimidade (1975) and Dôra Doralina (1982), the latter one being based on Rachel de Queiroz's eponymous book.

In 1989, after his divorce from Vera Fischer, stricken by a severe existential crisis, Salles moved to Bahia, initially to Salvador and later to Trancoso. While living in Trancoso he learned that Rodrigo, his son with ex-wife Miriam Mehler, had died in a motorcycle accident. Since then he began to suffer from depression bouts, and the only films in which he acted during this period were O Efeito Ilha in 1994 and the critical and commercial failure Cinderela Baiana in 1998, in which he portrayed the erratic talent manager Pierre; despite the film's overwhelmingly negative reception, his acting as Pierre garnered him a small cult following.

In the early 2000s, after overcoming his depression, Salles went back to Rio de Janeiro, after being invited by friend Ivone Hoffmann to partake in a theater play. He then saw a resurgence, and later portrayed Mustafá in the 2001 telenovela O Clone and Pacheco in one episode of the 2005–07 HBO series Mandrake, his last major TV role.

In 2006, Salles suffered from a heart attack; after a surgery, a stent was implanted into his heart. During the surgery though, it was discovered that he had lung cancer, and that it had metastasized to his heart and brain. He retired from acting afterwards, in order to cure his disease, but would eventually succumb to it on June 17, 2009; his body was cremated and his ashes buried at the Caju Cemetery in Rio de Janeiro.

== Personal life ==
Salles married Spanish-born actress Miriam Mehler in 1968, having with her a son, Rodrigo, who died in a motorcycle accident in 1990, aged 20. They divorced in 1971.

He had a more durable relationship with Vera Fischer, whom he met in 1973 during the shooting of A Super Fêmea. They married in 1974 and divorced in 1989; Fischer later remarried Felipe Camargo, whom she met while working on the telenovela Mandala. They had two daughters, Rafaela and Renata. Even after their divorce Salles and Fischer remained very good friends.

His last marriage was with architect Beatriz Salles, with whom he had two more children, Romeu and Rômulo.

== Filmography ==
Year	Title	Role	Notes
1961	O Dono da Bola	Fernando	
1962	Assassinato em Copacabana	Silvio	
1973	A Super Fêmea		
1974	O Marido Virgem	Joel	
1974	As Mulheres Que Fazem Diferente		(segment "Uma Delícia de Mulher")
1974	As Delícias da Vida	Júlio	
1974	A Gata Devassa		
1975	Intimidade	Alex / Roberto	
1982	Dôra Doralina		
1994	O Efeito Ilha	Tom Amareto	
1998	Cinderela Baiana	Pierre	
2001–2002	O Clone	Mustafá Rachid	220 episodes
2004	Espelho d'Água: Uma Viagem no Rio São Francisco	Velho do Rodeador	
