= Ivailo Jordanov =

- Education: University of the Witwatersrand
- Occupation: Executive
- Known for: Co-founding Styloko and 23snaps

Ivailo Jordanov (Bulgarian: Ивайло Йорданов) is a business executive and the co-founder of Styloko and 23snaps.

== Background ==
Jordanov graduated with a Bachelor of Science degree in computer science and applied math from University of the Witwatersrand. He then began his career working for Espotting as Head of Product Development before founding his first site, zoomf.com, a residential property search engine. After working as a Director at Domavin, he has served as an advisor and investor for Novus Analytics and Avans. Jordanov co-founded Styloko.com in 2011 and 23Snaps.com in 2012.

He has been quoted or featured in various media outlets including Huffington Post, The Telegraph, Bloomberg News, Fast Company, Tech Crunch, Forbes, CNN Money, and Wired.
