= MocoSpace =

Mobile social network

- MocoSpace on iPhone
- Company type: Public
- Website type: Social networking service
- Available in: Multilingual (8)
- Founded: October 20, 2005; 21 years ago
- Headquarters: Boston, Massachusetts, US
- Industry: Internet
- Website: www.mocospace.com
- Registration: owner www.jnjmobile.com
- Users: ▲3.27 million monthly active users (September 8, 2015)
- Current status: Active
- Written in: Java

MocoSpace is a mobile social network. The features of the site are similar to other social networking sites. Features include mobile games, chat, instant messaging, eCards, and photos. Mocospace was created during the popularity of and based on Myspace.com.

Venture funding for start up companies in the mobile space expanded rapidly starting in 2005, and MocoSpace was a beneficiary of this trend. In 2007, MocoSpace received an initial $3 million series A round of venture funding. And in January 2008 MocoSpace received a $4 million series B round of funding. At that time, MocoSpace also announced 2 million registered users and 1 billion monthly page views. Like most social networking services, the business model is based on serving advertisements to users.

== See also ==
- List of social networking websites
