= Travellerspoint =

Australian travel website

- Travellerspoint logo
- Website type: Travel guide
- Available in: English
- Headquarters: Australia
- Area served: Worldwide
- Owner: Tupela Ltd AS
- Creators: Samuel Daams; Peter Daams
- Website: travellerspoint.com
- Launched: 2002; 24 years ago
- Current status: Active

Travellerspoint is a travel and social networking site for people who want to learn from or share experiences with other travellers. Members of the site participate through forums, blogs, photo galleries and a wiki travel guide, similar to Wikivoyage.

== Features ==
- Forums: members discuss their travel experiences in several destination and topic related forums.
- Travel guide: a custom built wiki in which users can edit information to help assist potential visitors; contributors are able to share in the revenue from advertising, or opt to use their share to lend through Kiva.
- Blogs: an integrated blogging system allowing users to post content to their own Travellerspoint subdomain.
- Photography: users can upload unlimited photos of their trips; the best photos are manually featured and displayed throughout the site.
- Maps: a mapping system that allows users to plot their trip's itinerary on a world map. It is interlinked with the photos and blogs. A user's map integrates their photography and blog entries through geotagging. In March 2007, Travellerspoint travel maps were nominated in the category of 'Best Use of Social Media' for the Travolution Awards.
- Travel planner: a travel planning tool that integrates with the above mapping tool; allows the planning of future trips and collaboration with other members.
- Travel helpers: an early addition to the Travellerspoint set of services was a Travel Helper system, which allowed members to sign up as travel helpers for any number of countries. There are currently over 3000 travel helpers.

== See also ==
- List of social networking websites
