= RateItAll =

Consumer review website

- Industry: website
- Founded: 1999
- Headquarters: San Francisco, California, USA
- Key people: Lawrence Coburn (CEO)
- Website: www.rateitall.com

RateItAll is a consumer-review website that also incorporates social networking. Consumers review diverse products and services, share information, and get paid modestly for their reviews. Its reviews include a five-star ranking system for those items being rated. It is one of the largest consumer-review internet based services, offering free access to over 8 million reviews posted on its website to date (as of 2010).

It serves as a free alternative to Consumer Reports and Angie's List which provide some similar fee-based services.

== Business model ==
RateItAll was founded in San Francisco in 1999 by software entrepreneur Lawrence Coburn and one other creator with the following business idea. The Internet features a wide range of user reviews and ratings for numerous purposes including social networking sites and blogs. The business premise was to provide useful reviews to prospective consumers as well as compensate reviewers for their effort. Since user reviews can be posted next to advertising, when people read the reviews, there is a chance that they will also see advertising beside the review, which may possibly lead to a sale or at least result in positive exposure. This benefits the advertiser. Since it is possible to track readership (of reviews and hopefully advertising) using Google's AdSense service, it's possible for advertisers to pay for this exposure through Google to RateItAll, and it's possible for RateItAll to share some of these revenues with reviewers to encourage contributions. Such was the business model.

Accordingly, RateItAll lets users rate a wide variety of things such as consumer products, services, movies, people, politics, travel, musicians, actors, colleges, baseball teams, drinks, and other things by uploading ratings and reviews from their computer to the RateItAll website. Reviewers are paid according to readership; this usually amounts to pennies per review, and the total amounts paid are not sizeable, even for prominent reviewers. RateItAll was an early proponent among Internet ratings services of sharing advertising revenues. In addition, the RateItAll website allowed users seeking information to use filters to isolate the opinions of specific demographic groups. Reviewers can manage their ratings lists with online tools. RateItAll also lets users submit lists.

RateItAll has different offerings.

- RateItAll Index: interactive ratings lists within nine consumer categories.
- RateItAll Local: interactive directories of local businesses.
- RateItAll Weblists: interactive ratings lists published by registered site members.

== Chronology ==
In January 2000, RateItAll had 10,000 ratings with a database of 150,000 reviews and ratings, according to one estimate. In 2001, a reporter writing about a reality show contestant on Survivor II airing on CBS television, quoted RateItAll's ratings in a newspaper story: "On RateItAll.com, 25 percent of the viewers hate her (the Survivor contestant), 25 percent think she's great, and there's not much in between." The company in a press release described itself in 2003 as a "leading aggregator and publisher of consumer reviews and public opinion." In 2003, co-founder and chief executive Lawrence Coburn claimed RateItAll had more than one million user-generated ratings in its database making it "one of the largest collections of consumer ratings in the world." Mr. Coburn elaborated that RateItAll tried to give "anyone with access to the Internet a chance to tell the world what they think on a broad variety of topics." In 2005, RateItAll offered an "interactive blog directory" to help readers find blogs, and help blog writers get feedback to help them promote their blogs. In 2006, PC Magazine featured RateItAll as "Web Site of the Week" in its December 4, 2006 issue. In February 2007, RateItAll's Alexa Internet rank was reportedly 24,455. Internet traffic estimators Quantcast and Compete placed RateItAll among the 6,000 most trafficked U.S. web sites.

In 2007, the firm teamed up with MuseStorm to offer MySpace list widgets which "let people share interesting lists they find on RateItAll in a scrolling top-10 format." Widgets, also known as web widgets, are chunks of embeddable code that can be grabbed on one site, and embedded in another, which do not require technical knowledge to use, since anybody who understands copy-and-paste can use them, according to RateItAll CEO Lawrence Coburn in a published interview. Coburn believes widgets are a future key to marketing RateItAll, and elaborated: "Widgets are especially interesting to me as a site owner as a means of acquiring new customers at a minimal cost, pushing my site's reach out to all corners of the Web, leveraging my site's existing content, reducing my site's dependence on SEO, and providing a nice source of organic, one-way, inbound links." It's possible for people who have blogs to insert a widget which tracks ratings of that blog. RateItAll partners with firms such as Kraft Foods and PriceGrabber.

In 2008, a controversy about opinions about an Ohio church and pastor reportedly led to a judge's order requiring RateItAll to release information about the senders of the e-mails. The RateItAll policy is to keep member contributions private. CEO Lawrence Coburn explained to a reporter: "The only information that we require to post a review is: e-mail address, nickname and password ... Therefore, we are unable to reveal people's true identities even if our privacy policy allowed us to, and it doesn't."

== Financial ==
Investors include various funds and individuals including Accelerator Ventures, JAIC America, Pacific I&T Ventures, and Eric Di Benedetto.

== Competitors ==
RateItAll competes with firms such as Epinions which also pay reviewers, as well as firms which do not, such as Amazon. One analyst in 2004 identified key competitors in the online consumer review niche as being Amazon, ConsumerREVIEW, Consumer Reports, ConsumerSearchReview, Epinions, and CentreReviewFinder. In addition, specialty sites offering reviews include CarREVIEW.com (new cars and accessories); ComputingREVIEW.com (computers, PDAs, and other high-tech equipment); GolfREVIEW.com (golf equipment); MtbREVIEW.com (mountain bikes); OutdoorREVIEW.com (snowboarding, skiing, fishing, and camping equipment); PCGameREVIEW.com (computer games and accessories); PCPhotoREVIEW.com (digital cameras); PhotographyREVIEW.com (35mm film cameras and equipment); RoadbikeREVIEW.com (bicycles); and VideogameREVIEW.com (video games and consoles). Another competitor is Make Five (www.makefive.com). Another source indicated Zagat was a major reviewer of restaurants. Other competitors possibly include Deja.com and Productopia. One newspaper critic in 2004 found RateItAll's product reviews weren't as extensive as Epinions.com and other larger sites. Open Ratings

A key ingredient to success in the online ratings business is "editorial integrity", according to one business analyst. Any site getting caught "favoring advertisers or e-commerce partners" will lose business fast. Accordingly, competitors such as Epinions have devised strategies to filter out poorly written reviews as well as prevent users from gaming the system, by using algorithms to prevent groups of users in "mutual admiration societies" from giving glowing reviews to each other's products. A continuing problem for all businesses in this category is eliminating reviews by unqualified reviewers interested only in "easy money" who offer hyped reviews. A continuing challenge for all ratings firms is a self-selection bias in which a "tally of self-selected respondents is not scientifically reliable," and various firms have tried to solve this problem with different strategies.

== See also ==
- Epinions
- List of social networking sites
