= Bazaarvoice =

American software company

- Type: Private company
- Industry: Software
- Founded: 2005
- Founder: Brett Hurt and Brant Barton
- Headquarters: Austin, Texas
- Key people: Keith Nealon (CEO)
- Website: www.bazaarvoice.com

Bazaarvoice is a technology company based in Austin, Texas, that provides software that allows brands and retailers to collect and display several types of user-generated content (UGC) on their e-commerce websites. Bazaarvoice's services include product ratings and reviews, questions and answers, sampling, visual and social content, insights, social commerce and social publishing.

== History ==
Bazaarvoice was co-founded in 2005 by Brett Hurt and Brant Barton in Austin, Texas. The company has offices in New York City, Chicago, London, Munich, Belfast, Paris, Vilnius, Sydney, and Bengaluru.

Bazaarvoice started off creating software that lets businesses add product reviews to their websites. The company later expanded to include software that allows businesses to analyze reviews, ratings, videos, social media, and other user-generated content posted by customers, which is used by companies including Wal-Mart, AT&T and Microsoft.

The company went public on the NASDAQ in 2012, raising $114 million in its initial public offering. Following that, in a 2013 Gartner report, Bazaarvoice was named one of the ten fastest growing CRM vendors. A year later, in 2014, Bazaarvoice and TripleLift partnered to allow native ads to run on client websites.

In 2018, Marlin Equity Partners purchased the company and took it private. In 2021, Bazaarvoice announced a majority investment from Thomas H. Lee Partners.

Over the years, the company has made several acquisitions, including AddStructure, a natural language processing platform, in 2018; Influenster, a product discovery and review platform, in 2019; Curalate, a social commerce platform, in 2020; and affable.ai, an influencer marketing platform, in 2023.

Keith Nealon was named CEO in January 2020, replacing interim CEO Joe Davis.
