= Clips (software) =

Video editing software

- Developer: Apple Inc.
- Release: April 6, 2017
- Final release: 3.1.7 / May 9, 2024; 2 years ago
- Operating system: iOS
- Type: Video editor
- Website: www.apple.com/clips/

Clips is a discontinued mobile video editing software application created by Apple Inc. It was released onto the iOS App Store on April 6, 2017, for free. Initially, it was only available on 64-bit devices running iOS 10.3 or later; as of version 3.1.3, it requires iOS 16.0 or later. Apple describes it as an app for "making and sharing fun videos with text, effects, graphics, and more.". Its final release was on May 9, 2024 before was removed from the App Store on October 10, 2025.

== Features ==
After launching of the app, the user sees the view of the front-facing camera. The app allows the user to create a new clip by tapping on a red record button, or use photos or videos from the device's photo library. Once a clip is recorded, it can be added to a project timeline shown at the bottom of the screen. The user can share their project on social media platforms. The user can also add filters and effects to the project. "Live Titles" (available in several styles) can also be created by dictating to the device.

== See also ==
- iMovie
- List of photo and video apps
