= Tianji.com =

Tianji.com (Chinese: 天际网) was a Chinese professional social networking website. Tianji stopped operations on December 27, 2015.

== History ==
Tianji was founded in 2005 by CEO Derek Ling. It joined Viadeo in 2008. In 2010-11, it started entering a period of explosive growth, attracting over 380,000 users per month.

== Purpose ==
Tianji was a professional social networking website, in a similar fashion to LinkedIn. According to CEO Derek Ling, Tianji focused on a group of Chinese professionals who are younger than 40 but have also graduated from college, a demographic that gains value through its existing contacts and work experience. By 2013 the site was predicted to have 35 million users.

== Statistics ==
Tianji claimed up to over 15 million users, according to its website. The website also claimed that there were over 37,000 executive searchers on the website, and that 90% of users report successful communication with managers and businesspeople.
