= Elixio =

Elixio Network
- Website type: Social networking service
- Industry: Information technology
- Employees: 45
- Website: www.elixio.net
- Commercial: Yes
- Registration: Invitation-only
- Launched: July 2007; 19 years ago
- Current status: Active

Elixio Network is a Web3 social networking platform. Elixio authenticates new members and requires 3 factor authentication: An invitation from an existing member, a LinkedIn account and an Apple or Google ID.

== Mission ==
Elixio Network's mission is to promote trust in social media by utilizing Deep Learning and AI. The platform leverages world's first and only tokenized Social Blockchain for network quality and authenticity. Members can select Dating, Social and Business modes on the platform.

== Management ==
Unlike other similar social networks, Elixio is managed by its members who volunteer in day-to-day activities such as addressing inappropriate behavior, hate, bots, commercial content, unverified news, and conspiracy theories. Members who participate in management activities are rewarded Elixium tokens and advanced administrative privileges. By the start of 2021, Elixio had more than 15 million monthly active users.
