= Sharesome =

Cypriot adult social media website

- Screenshot Sharesome homepage
- Website type: Adult Social Media
- Available in: English
- Key people: Tudor Bold (co-founder and CEO), Ralf kappe (co-founder) and Tam Tam (co-Founder)
- Website: sharesome.com
- Registration: Optional (required to submit, comment, or like)
- Users: 1 million+
- Current status: Active

Sharesome is an adult social media website founded in 2018 and based in Cyprus. The website's founders claim they built Sharesome for adult content creators and to offer them tools to grow their audience. Due to its familiar social network design, the platform has been dubbed “the Facebook of pornography".

== Site overview ==
Email is not required for registration and users can stay anonymous. The platform allows users to join or create topics and interact with each other based on shared interests. Inside topics, users can upload content as well as share links of photos, videos and GIFs. Communities are manually moderated according to their guidelines. Sharesome receives 2.5 million visits per month and is ranked #8,500 in the United States according to Similarweb. The platform primarily expanded its user base in the wake of the Tumblr ban on NSFW content. This growth was unique compared to other adult content providers, which typically monetize from older or less tech-savvy audiences. However, Sharesome has managed to attract a different demographic, demonstrating its reliance on a more diverse and technologically adept audience.

== History ==
Sharesome was launched in 2018. The company has reported over one million user registrations to its Flame Token airdrop.
