= Fillos de Galicia =

- Company type: Non-profit
- Website type: Web portal
- Available in: GL, ES
- Dissolved: 2025
- Headquarters: Spain
- Owner: Asociacion Cultural Fillos de Galicia
- Creator: Asociacion Cultural Fillos de Galicia
- Founder: Manuel Casal Lodeiro
- Website: Fillos.org
- Commercial: No
- Registration: Optional
- Users: 6,700
- Launched: 1997
- Current status: inactive

Fillos de Galicia is a web portal and virtual community that focuses on the Galician culture and diaspora. The site focuses on promoting unity between Galicians and the Galician diaspora. The community is a hub that provides information about the Galician language or finding relatives in Galicia using the Atopadoiro. Fillos.org is one of the most popular websites regarding Galicia and its diaspora.

== History ==
Fillos de Galicia was started in 1997 by Manuel Casal Lodeiro, son of Galician emigrants. The supporting association spawned sister sites dealing with specific themes relating to Galicians.

== Statistics ==
As of 2010, more than 6700 users had registered, from over 70 countries. Most are between ages 30 and 60. Over 1500 live in Argentina, with sizable populations in Spain and Brazil. Over half are either born in Galicia or children of Galicians. Another 1200 are grandchildren and great-grandchildren of Galicians.

== Sources ==
- "Fillos de Galicia: Aparicións na prensa". www.fillos.org.
- "Fillos de Galicia: Estatísticas da comunidade virtual". www.fillos.org.
- "Fillos de Galicia: O Atopadoiro". December 20, 2006. Archived from the original on December 20, 2006.
