= Laneros =

Digital community

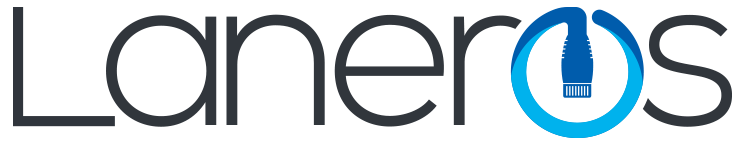
- Available in: Spanish
- Website: https://www.laneros.com/
- Registration: Optional
- Launched: 1999
- Current status: Online

Laneros (often stylized as LANeros) is a digital community of over 390,000 members worldwide, mostly of Hispanic countries, started in 1999. Its slogan is "Digital Addiction". The name comes from the so-called LAN (Local area network) parties, which were where the founders gathered to play videogames 20 years ago, and would translate to English as "LANners".
