= MEETin =

Web-based social community

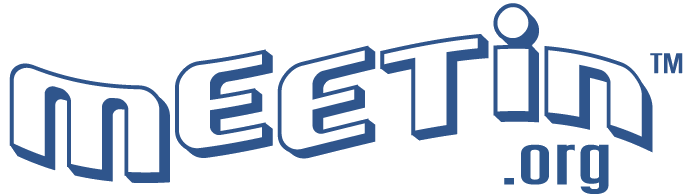
- Website type: Social
- Owner: MEETin.org
- Creator: Mikey Heard
- Website: www.meetin.org
- Commercial: No
- Registration: Free
- Launched: March 14, 2003; 23 years ago

MEETin.org, or the MEETin group, is a web-based social community dedicated to providing a casual social environment for people without charging membership fees, or otherwise profiting from events. Founded in Washington, DC in 2003, the MEETin group now spans around 90 cities worldwide and has over 90,000 members.

== History ==
The MEETin group was established by Mikey Heard on 14 March 2003, in Washington, DC, to connect people socially in the city. As the DC chapter became increasingly active, another 16 chapters were founded in other US cities, which included many of the largest MEETin chapters to this day. Although MEETin began as a Yahoo Group, Heard soon constructed a new web site to deal with the expansion in membership and locations. This web site now defines the identity of the MEETin group and the infrastructure is still very much in use today.

== The MEETin Vibe ==
The MEETin "Vibe" represents the general culture and attitude of the MEETin group. Each chapter is run by local volunteers with the main purpose of bringing people together to find new friends in their city. The MEETin group also help connect cities around the globe, and allows members to quickly re-establish their social network across various MEETin cities. As an integral part of the MEETin Vibe, members are encouraged to organize and participate in social events in any given MEETin city, without the pressures of business networking or "pick-up" scenes. Further, members are also forbidden to organize events from which they can profit, either financially or by gain of goods or services.

MEETin has been recognized in both the Washington Post and Business Week.

== Event planning and participation ==
Events can be organized by any MEETin member, or co-hosted by two members. Leaders will assist in hosting of events as necessary. Interest groups can also be established on each local MEETin chapter to facilitate specially-catered events, such as film viewing, dinner nights, and book clubs. It was specifically designed to not be a dating service. Events are created by any member by posting it on the local group's web site, and events have no fees or dues.

== Website shutdown ==
In March 2021, the website indicated that it would be shutting down on April 4, 2021, with some of the activity moving to Facebook.
