= Watermarkremover.io =

Digital watermark removal website

- Screenshot on 20 November 2025
- Creator: Pixelbin.io
- Website: www.watermarkremover.io
- Launched: January 2023

Watermarkremover.io is a digital watermark removal website by Pixelbin.io. It features a commercial watermark removal API for images. The website has been noted for its effectiveness in this task, which caused alarm among some media outlets for its illegal use case in infringing copyright for copyrighted photography, although the tool itself is legal.

== Release ==
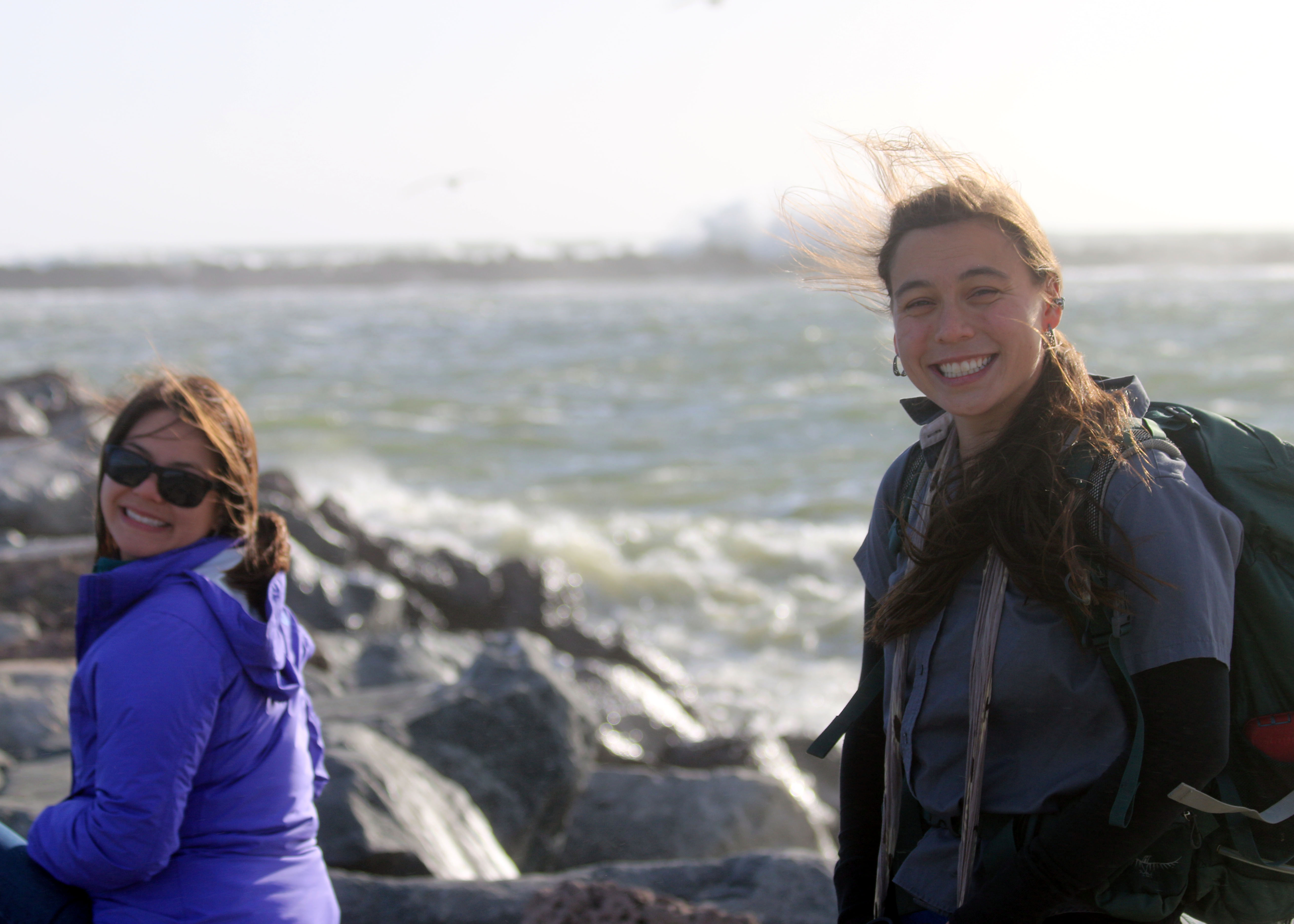
Original public domain photo by the United States Fish and Wildlife Service

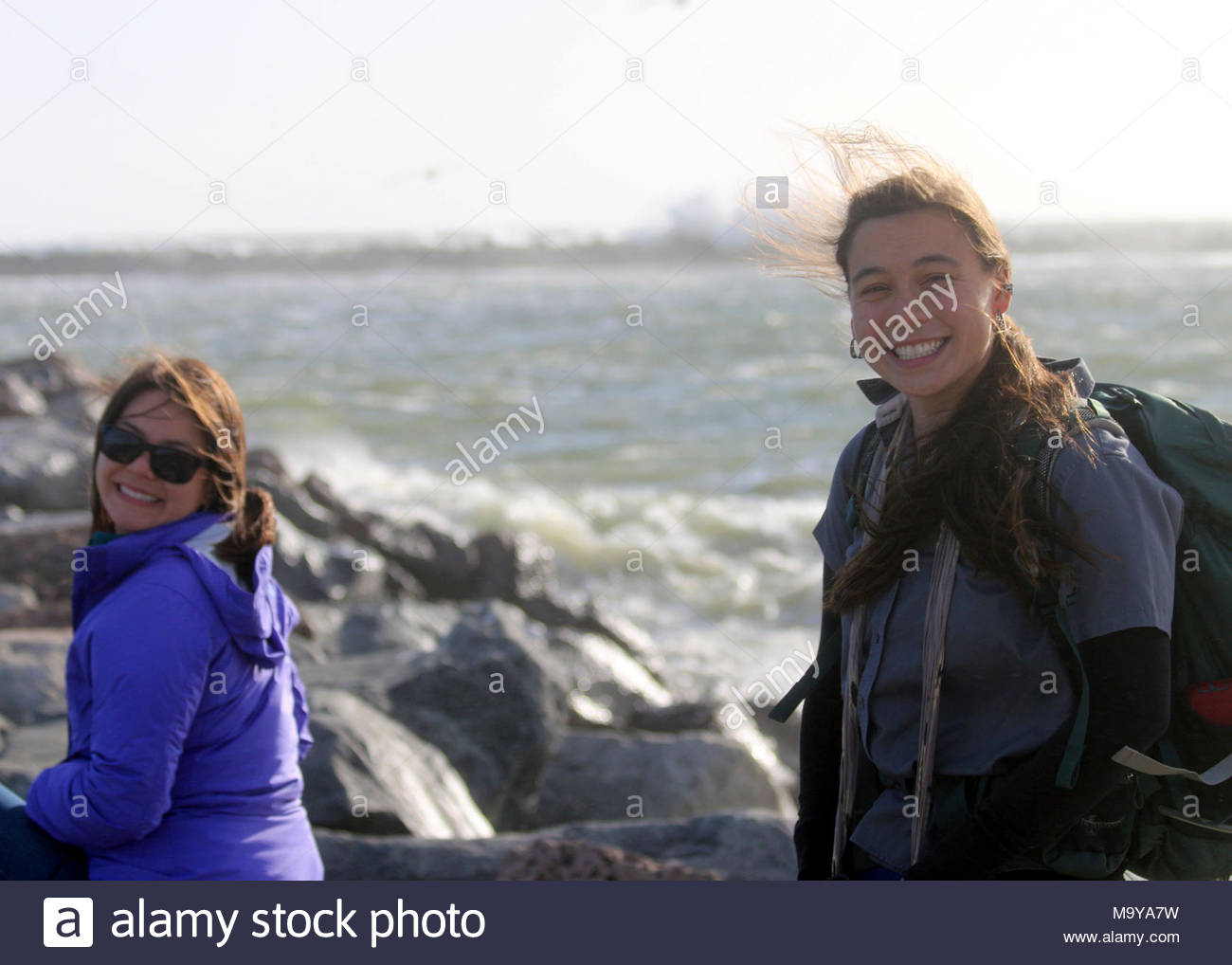
Same image as sold by Alamy with copyfraud watermarks added

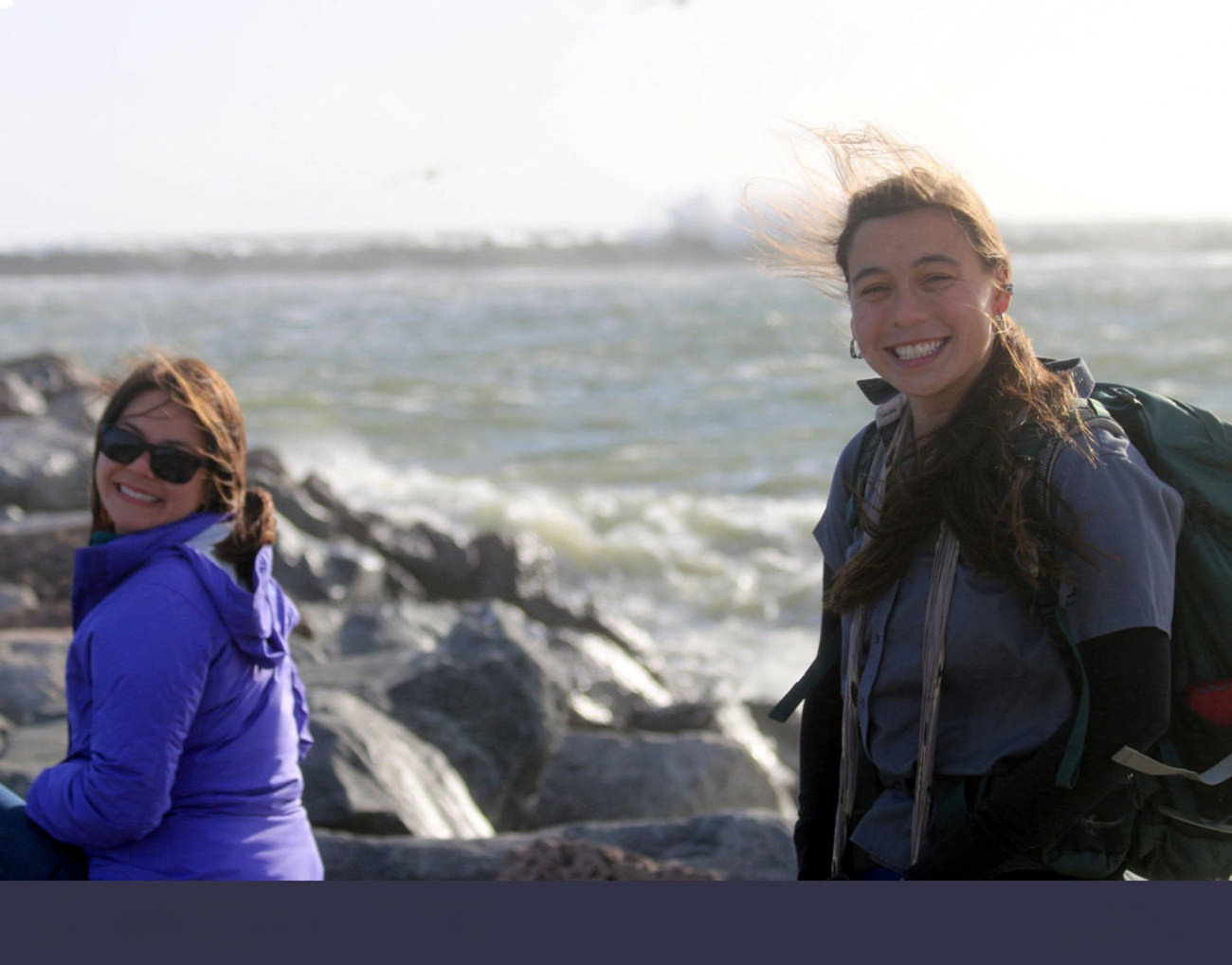
Watermarks removed by Watermarkremover.io

Watermarkremover.io first appeared on Product Hunt in January 2023, being released by developer Pixelbin.io. It is also available as an Android app.

== Services ==
Watermarkremover.io features a commercial digital watermark removal API which uses generative artificial intelligence-powered inpainting to detect and erase watermarks in digital images and thereafter fill in the background. This operation is performed entirely online by uploading the image to the website, with no need for downloading software. The website can be accessed without payment, works with the PNG, JPEG, WEBP and HEIC file formats, and is intended both for personal and professional use.

== Reception ==
When Watermarkremover.io appeared on Product Hunt, tech media outlets commented on its effectiveness at removing watermarks from images on a free and accessible platform. The Verge tested the remover against several images from stock photo websites (including Shutterstock, Adobe Stock, and Getty Images) and concluded that it "effortlessly erases watermarks on copyrighted images in seconds", but struggles with "singular, blockier watermarks." PetaPixel agreed that the website "easily vanishes photographers' logos," while Digital Camera World accused the website of "daylight robbery." Media outlets also noted that this technology was not new, with a predecessor in Adobe Photoshop's content-aware fill, but was contrasted by its costlessness and relative accessibility. Although the tool itself is legal, outlets highlighted its illegal use case of infringing an image owner's copyright by reproducing dewatermarked images without their consent. In addressing this, the creators of Watermarkremover.io emphasized legal use of the tool and disclaimed responsibility for infringement by users.

== See also ==
- Digital watermark
- AI content watermarking
