= Spaces (social network) =

Russian social network service

- Screenshot
- Website type: Social networking service
- Available in: Russian, Ukrainian
- Website: spaces.im
- Commercial: Yes
- Registration: Required to do any activity
- Launched: 2006; 20 years ago
- Current status: Online

Spaces is a Russian social network service that targets mobile phone users.

== History ==
The website was launched in 2006.

In 2009, it was ranked 7th on Opera's top ten visited social networking sites.

Konstantin Vladimirovich Rak, who was sued by Epic Games for allegedly creating cheats to Fortnite, was a user of the service.

Alexa ranks it as the 471st most popular website in Russia in March 2013; the number of connections has been steadily increasing over the past two years.

== See also ==
- List of social networking services
- VK (service)
