= I Had Cancer =

Social support network for cancer fighters

IHadCancer
- Company type: Private
- Website type: Social Network Service
- Founded: July 2011
- Headquarters: Manhattan, NY, U.S.
- Area served: Worldwide
- Key people: Anthony Del Monte; Mailet Lopez
- Employees: 6
- Website: ihadcancer.com
- Current status: Active

IHadCancer is a social support network for cancer fighters, survivors, and their supporters. Built by Squeaky Wheel Media, the site launched in July 2011. IHadCancer was founded by Mailet Lopez and Anthony Del Monte and is located in Chelsea, Manhattan.

== History ==
In 2008, Mailet Lopez was diagnosed with breast cancer. She decided to build a site focused on creating connections between people who can help one another in dealing with cancer through their unique experiences. As co-founder of Squeaky Wheel Media, she used the company's experience in web development and design to produce IHadCancer.com. According to Mailet, the name, "I Had Cancer" stems from her personal battle with the disease and represents the importance of a positive attitude and "looking towards the future".

In 2012, Squeaky Wheel Media won the Webby Award for the Community Category for the site IHadCancer. Members can create personal profiles, invite others to their circle of friends and contribute to discussions. They can browse the community section and search for others based on gender, age, location, type of cancer and treatment.
