= Milagres, Bahia =

Municipality of Bahia, Brazil

Coordinates: 12°52′12″S 39°51′32″W

Milagres
- Municipality
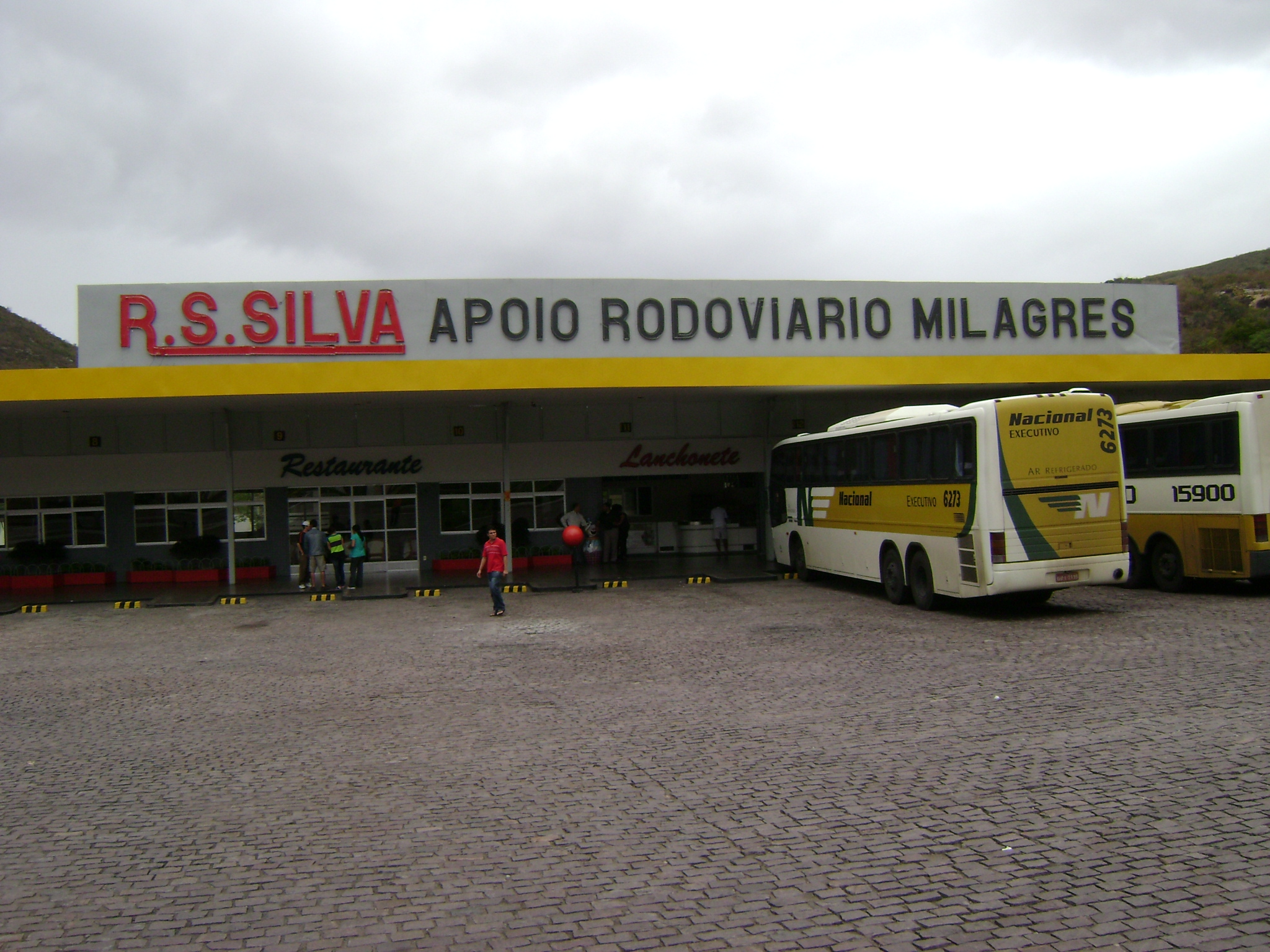

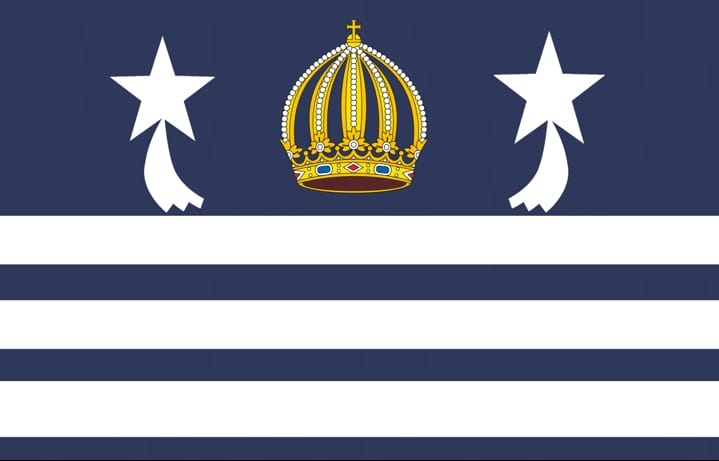
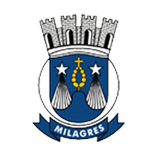
- Flag Coat of arms
- Interactive map of Milagres
- Country: Brazil
- Region: Nordeste
- State: Bahia

Population (2020)
  - Total: 10,893
- Time zone: UTC−3 (BRT)

Milagres is a municipality in the state of Bahia in the North-East region of Brazil.

== See also ==
- List of municipalities in Bahia
