= Total Recut =

Video sharing website

- Website type: Video sharing
- Available in: English
- Owner: Owen Gallagher
- Creator: Owen Gallagher
- Website: www.totalrecut.com
- Registration: Optional
- Launched: June 2007

Total Recut is a social networking, video sharing and resources website for fans and creators of video remixes, recuts and mash-ups, where users can submit, view, share, rate and comment on user generated remixed video clips. Total Recut was created in June 2007 as a result of the master's degree project of an Irish graduate student, Owen Gallagher, who wrote his Masters Thesis on remix culture. The County Donegal, Ireland based service uses embedding technology to display a wide array of video content, including movie trailer recuts, political remixes, machinima, subvertisements, music mash-ups and many others. The site also contains original material that users can remix including a large number of public domain videos and Creative Commons licensed clips.

Unregistered users of Total Recut are able to watch videos on the site, while registered users may submit an unlimited number of videos and make wiki style changes to any information relating to the content. The site offers social networking opportunities in the ability to add friends, comment on each other's profiles, start personal video collections and send messages, as well as an active forum and blog, which users can contribute to freely. Users can also enter contests to win prizes, find tutorials and tools to help them create their own remixes, learn about the issues surrounding remix culture, including the balance between copyright and freedom of expression, download mobile content to their cellphones and connect with other like-minded individuals.

== Awards ==
Total Recut was shortlisted for the final of the 2007 Golden Spiders awards, hosted in Dublin and the 2007 Northern Ireland 25k Awards for innovative business ideas hosted in Belfast. The project was also successful in qualifying for the Fellowship Global Scholars program, following an intensive application and interview process. In January 2008, founder Owen Gallagher was sent to Kansas City, Missouri as part of the Global Scholars program, along with 11 others from the UK, Ireland and Denmark, to make connections and learn about US entrepreneurship with a view to expanding their business ideas upon their return.

== Media attention ==
In June 2007, as part of the Total Recut project, several video recuts were created and uploaded to YouTube to coincide with the Irish general elections, to decide who the next Taoiseach (Prime Minister) was going to be. The two candidates were the existing Taoiseach, Bertie Ahern and the leader of the opposition, Enda Kenny. Bertie Ahern's annual Ard Fheis speech was remixed with footage from the BBC TV show, Dragons' Den to make it appear as if Ahern was pitching an idea to the Dragons. Enda Kenny's Ard Fheis speech was remixed with footage from the popular American Idol TV show, which showed him auditioning for Simon Cowell and his judging panel. Both videos became popular nationally and received significant media attention including write ups in the Sunday Tribune, the Sunday Business Post, the Sunday Independent and the Derry People/Donegal News as well as being played on national radio stations including 2FM, Today FM, 98FM and Phantom FM, appearing on TV3 News, numerous blogs and being added to thousands of Bebo profile pages. The videos have now been watched over 200,000 times.

In December 2007, three videos created as part of the Total Recut project were removed from YouTube under grounds of copyright infringement. This also meant that the YouTube account was 'permanently disabled' for having three strikes against it. The videos in question were the aforementioned 'Bertie Ahern on Dragons Den' clip, which BBC Worldwide claimed was infringing on their copyright, a video entitled 'Shrek Recut' that Paramount Pictures felt was infringing on their copyrights and a clip entitled 'Dynamite Drugs' which used footage from the 20th Century Fox owned, Napoleon Dynamite, and remixed it with a public domain public service announcement from the 1950s. Each of these videos were between 1 and 3 minutes in length, held no commercial value whatsoever and were created as part of a University of Ulster Master's degree project on remix culture.

Total Recut founder, Owen Gallagher filed counter notifications on all three videos to BBC Worldwide, Paramount Pictures and 20th Century Fox and within 10 days, all three videos were reinstated and his YouTube account was restored. The story received significant media attention with articles published in the Irish Daily Mirror, The Sunday Tribune and the Derry People/Donegal News, as well as numerous blog references including the American University Center for Social Media and popular Irish blog, Mulley.net.
