= FX Photo Studio =

Photography application for iOS

- Developer: Macphun LLC
- Stable release: 4.7 / March 24, 2012; 14 years ago
- Operating system: iOS
- Type: Raster graphics editor

FX Photo Studio is a digital photography application for the Apple iPhone. It is compatible with iPhone, iPod Touch, and iPad, requires iOS 4.3 or later.

== Product backstory ==
FX Photo Studio 1.0 was developed in 2009 for the original iPhone and received recognition among the smartphone users. Now it is regularly updated. In 2011 a version for Mac was released. In 2011 BestAppEver portal named FX Photo Studio the best photo editing app of the year.

== Features ==
FX Photo Studio uses the iPhone's camera to allow the user shoot photographs, download them from camera roll or iTunes, crop, flip and rotate, apply 194 effects and filters that make photos look like they were taken with a film camera or like sketches, pop-art or else. Users are allowed to mix and customize effects, paint with them, save combinations and share them. It is possible to edit gamma, hue and saturation, contrast and exposure. There is an extra feature of Selective color photography. The maximum resolution for photos can be set ranging from 320 to 2592. In Options menu users can configure the maximum resolution, quality, hidden effects, online help, shake to apply a random effect, auto rotate image, add location info to the picture.

== Sharing ==
Users are allowed to share pictures through Instagram, Facebook, Twitter, Flickr, Tumblr, send them using e-mail and order pictures to be sent as postcards around the world.
