= Gaudiopolis =

Former children's republic in Budapest

Gaudiopolis (from Latin gaudium – joy and Ancient Greek πόλις – city, City of Joy) was a self-administrated children's republic in Budapest following World War II.

== History ==
Gábor Sztehlo (1909–1974) was a Lutheran pastor in Budapest who had saved hundreds of Jewish people from Nazi and Hungarian Fascist persecution during World War II. Following extensive damage and destruction of the properties used for sheltering the people under his protection during the siege of Budapest, he set up another home for children in March 1945 using an abandoned villa on Budakeszi Út, which was situated in the less bombed district of Buda. Here he provided shelter for Jewish children waiting for family members to claim them, but also for other underprivileged and abandoned children, orphans and children of 'class aliens' according to the new communist rulers.

Due to the increasing number or children seeking shelter, further abandoned villas in the same neighbourhood were also occupied. Here the children were given shelter and regular schooling, provided by idealistic teachers. Pastor Sztehlo wanted the children to overcome social boundaries and to grow up to become independent and critical citizens. In November 1945, the number of children having reached more than 200 (some of them as young as four years old), Pastor Sztehlo called a general assembly in the reception room of the main villa. In front of the assembled children, he called out "Now make a republic!" and left the room. After some silence, a voice raised the question as to whether they needed some kind of constitution. This was debated and it was quickly agreed that, among many other things, such a constitution should guarantee the right to education and include the prohibition of war. László Keveházi was appointed prime minister while Pastor Sztehlo was unanimously elected honorary president of the republic.

There were regular cabinet meetings, a currency called Gapo Dollar (linked in value to the price of tram tickets in Budapest) and a newspaper, called Gapo-Matyi, which reported critically on government proceedings. Apart from the constitution, a code of laws was also drafted. Elections were held to appoint judges, the chief of police and representatives from each room of the villas. Children were allocated to the different villas according to their gender and age. The eldest boys lived in the 'Villa of the wolves', while other villas had names such as 'Villa of the swallows', 'Rainbow Villa' and 'Villa of the squirrels'; girls had their accommodation in the 'Castle of girls' and were not allowed to stand for election. One of the most important features of the life in Gaudiopolis was work for the community. The citizens had to get acquainted with different professional fields in proper workshops. Everyone needed to contribute to the efforts in solving the problems which emerged in the common life of the whole community.

The main problems faced by Gaudiopolis were the lack of funds and food for the children, leading them to unanimously add an amendment to the constitution allowing theft in situations of need. With Pastor Sztehlo's intervention, they received some money from the provisional Hungarian government and in 1946 they were granted aid from the Red Cross.

In March 1946, an insurrection was staged by the 12-to-16-year-olds, due to their perceived lack of representation and participation in government. Prime Minister Keveházi resigned and, following an electoral campaign, a new government was elected representing children from all age groups.

Conscious of the perils of boredom, and in order to distract the children from their memories of pain and suffering, regular activities were organised: dancing, movies and lectures by prominent members of adult society, such as writers, theatre directors and doctors.

In 1950 or 1951, under the Stalinist regime of Mátyás Rákosi, the children's home was nationalised and the Gaudiopolis project abandoned. Sztehlo and many of his students left the country in the years that followed; their legacy was immortalized in the movie Valahol Európában.

== Success ==
Many of the citizens of Gaudiopolis went on to lead successful and distinguished lives, becoming scientists, doctors, lawyers, pastors and businessmen. They include the Nobel laureate for Chemistry George Olah and the London-based writer and journalist Mátyás Sárközi. Former residents of Gaudiopolis still meet annually to commemorate their past and pay homage to the tomb of Pastor Sztehlo.

== Bibliography ==
- Sztehlo, Gábor (1994). In the Hands of God. Gabor Sztehlo Foundation. ISBN 978-9630441483.
