= Filmow =

Brazilian film-focused social network

- Website type: Social networking service
- Available in: Brazilian Portuguese
- Owner: Rogério Bonfim
- Creators: Alisson Patrício, Rogério Bonfim, Thaís de Lima and Wanderson Niquini
- Key people: Rogério Bonfim
- Website: filmow.com
- Commercial: Yes
- Launched: April 1, 2009; 17 years ago
- Current status: Active

Filmow is a Brazil-based collaborative social network where users list the films and series they have watched or would like to watch, having the option of giving a review of up to 5 stars. The user shares its registered film library with friends. In addition, the site also has the basic functions of a social network where the user can meet new people and make new friends. It was founded by Alisson Patrício and Thais Lima, and it was launched on April 1, 2009.

== Website ==
Filmow allows all users, whether registered or not, to access any title information from the website database, making it a free for research, where anyone can seek information (cast, trailers, posters, reviews...), but only those who register the site can set up a profile and enjoy all the social functions. The site creates a detailed profile of each user's movie taste, gathering and displaying movies and favorite artists and also the movies the user have seen, want to see and doesn't want see. Furthermore, users can also share their opinions about the movies, series and novels through assessments on each title's own page. If a title is not found on the site, users can add their own.

== History ==
In 2008, Thais Lima met Skoob, a social network dedicated to literature, and then had the idea of a social network focused on movies. She showed her idea to her childhood friend Alisson Patrício, who readily approved the idea, and the two soon began working on the project. The project started very small, without foreign investment, and the work done in their spare time, with all the programming done by Alisson, but when the site began to grow they called their friend Wanderson Niquini to join the project with them and help in spreading the website. Rogério Bonfim joined Filmow in 2011 to bring Filmow to next level. They opened an office in São Paulo. As of 2026, Filmow has more than 3 million registered users.

== Team ==
Filmow is owned and led by Rogério Bonfim. The current team includes programmers Lucas Vido and Adan Marques, and community manager Kaique Augusto. Thiago Avelino and Thaís de Lima are no longer part of the project. The site is also supported by a group of long-time volunteer moderators who curate its database.

== Mobile apps ==
Filmow has official mobile apps for Android, available on Google Play, and for iOS, available on the App Store. The Android app was relaunched in a new version in 2026. The apps let users rate films and series, build lists, and check which streaming services carry each title in Brazil.
