= Kroogi =

Russian social networking service

- Website type: Social networking service
- Available in: English; Russian
- Headquarters: San Francisco
- Founder: Miro Sarbaev
- Website: kroogi.com
- Launched: 2007; 19 years ago

Kroogi [Russian: Круги, translation: circles] is a social networking service where musicians, painters, writers, videographers, photographers, and other users and organizations that wish to share their projects with the world, showcase their work. Their supporters can follow their activity, download content, and make monetary contributions.

Kroogi encourages its users to support artists and their projects through voluntary contributions, and by promoting artistic content. Users pay for downloading content based on a “Pay what you want” model, which allows fans and followers to set their own price for artists’ work. Artists also have the option of setting a minimum necessary contribution for downloads.

Kroogi offers a middle ground between free-of-charge (and often illegal) and fixed-fee models in ways that respect both artist and user rights.

== History ==
Kroogi was founded in 2007 by Miro Sarbaev, a director at Liquid Audio as well as Shawn Fanning's Napster and SNOCAP.

The beta version of the site was launched on November 11, 2008.

The beta version focused on the Russian market. In its first year, the site attracted major names in the music, art, publishing and film industries. Countless communities of fans and supporters have sprung up around Kroogi projects.

Since its launch, Kroogi and its projects have made multiple appearances in the national press and on major TV channels such as MTV and MuzTV. As of April, 2010, the Kroogi beta version supported an active community of approximately 45,000 artists and fans in and around Russia.

A year later, after building a community of approximately 100,000 artists and fans in and around Russia, Kroogi began expansion into the U.S., Europe and South America.

In March 2010, t.A.T.u. launched a contest on Kroogi.

== Main Features ==
Kroogi provides customized tools for social interaction, community creation, fundraising, content sharing, chatting, content rating and more. The Kroogi Facebook application and embeddable music widget for blogs and websites allow artists to give their content a global audience, and fans to share and promote artist's content.

Use of the website is free. In order to receive contributions for their content, users are required to create a Kroogi account. Similar to Myspace and Facebook, users can add other users as friends, send private messages, and post comments and announcements. They can also add images, writings, videos, music, create folders with multiple files, and share their content with other users and projects. Users must own the copyright or have permissions of copyright owners for the content they upload to their profile.

In addition to regular personal profiles, users can create project profiles to manage their creative projects. For example, band members can set up individual personal profiles for themselves, and then create a project profile for their band and manage it together. A project profile can have multiple hosts, whereas a personal profile is managed solely by the person who created it. Projects can be created after user registration.

== Founder of Kroogi, Miro Sarbaev ==
Kroogi was founded by Miro Sarbaev. During the collapse of the Soviet Union (1985–1990), he worked as a freelance journalist for major newspapers and news agencies in Russia. In 1990, he co-founded IMA Press, a Russian news agency and opened an IMA office in the USA where he also began consulting for technology companies. In 1999, Miro was hired by Napster's Shawn Fanning to manage Napster's database group. In 2002, he joined Fanning's Snocap, where he served as director of engineering and built Snocap's music licensing engine. He founded Kroogi in 2007 and launched the community in November, 2008.

Miro resides in San Francisco and Moscow, and commutes frequently between the two locations. He holds a M.S. in Nuclear Engineering from Moscow Power Engineering University.
