= Zoo.gr =

Greek social networking and online games website

- Website type: Social network service, Online games service
- Available in: Greek
- Headquarters: Athens, Greece
- Owner: Zoo Bytes
- Creators: Michalis Nafpliotis, Dimitris Mpanis, Costas Chatzikokolakis
- Website: www.zoo.gr
- Commercial: Yes
- Registration: Required
- Launched: April 22, 2004; 22 years ago
- Current status: Active

Zoo.gr is a social networking and online games website, which is placed among the top 10 most visited sites in Greece (among people who have the Alexa toolbar installed on their browser), and is the largest Greek social networking site. The company was founded in 2004. In December 2008, Zoo claimed to have recorded a total number of 900.000 unique visitors.

== Features ==
Zoo.gr has a desktop layout, i.e. users can use desktop icons and windows, similar to their desktop in Microsoft windows. They can also create an online profile (in which they can add photos and videos) and add other users to their friends list so that they can stay connected online.

While users are online, they can use an in-site application to exchange mails with each other, join the chat, read news through FanClubs, an internal site application which reproduced news items from various websites, or play games, either single-player or multiplayer. All games are programmed in flash and include very simple and common games like chess, crosswords, backgammon, pool table, poker, blackjack etc.

== Zoo Coins ==
Zoo.gr has a kind of “currency” inside of it, which allows users to buy services such as more profile search options, profile picture in “Person of the Week” and game tournaments bet with other users.

== See also ==
- Ark Nova
