= KizlarSoruyor =

- Company type: Private
- Founded: January 24, 2011; 15 years ago St. Louis, Missouri, U.S.
- Founder: Tolga Tanrıseven
- Website: www.KizlarSoruyor.com

KizlarSoruyor is a digital community, question-based social sharing platform and Turkish version of GirlsAskGuys. The platform is meant to close the gap between genders by bringing them together to help each other for which the users use the platform to ask questions and exchange ideas.

== History ==
KizlarSoruyor was co-founded in 2011 by Tolga Tanrıseven and Menguc Tanriseven. The site was initially developed by Tolga Tanrıseven as a hobby; based on the idea of an incident in a bar in America where he gets the advice from a girl talk to another girl and it works well. Initially the website started as GirlsAskGuys in USA in 2008 and adapted to Turkey in 2011.

As of 2015, the website attracted 400–500 thousand visitors daily and 9 million a month in Turkey, and 18 million worldwide monthly. The site had 350 thousand members in Turkey. The number of members worldwide was 800 thousand, 7-8 thousand questions were asked a day, these questions came to 160,000 views a day and 200 thousand shares were observed per day.

== Investment ==
In 2013 KizlarSoruyor received $1 million investment from a USA based investor, O'Brien Capital.

== Polls ==
The platform also publishes polls for where users vote in various categories, including "Father of the Year", "Most Romantic Couple of the Year", "Most Beautiful Bride of the Year", and "Symbolic Valentine's Day Couple".
