= Process (iOS application) =

- Developer(s): Alaric Cole
- Initial release: 15 December 2011
- Stable release: 3.0 / December 1, 2012
- Operating system: iOS
- License: Proprietary
- Website: Link to App Store until 2014, later dead

Process is non-linear editing photography software designed for iOS devices. Released in December 2011, Process can import, edit, and share digital photos, and perform non-destructive editing using hardware acceleration. It was available on the Apple App Store until 2014.

It is comparable to Apple Inc.'s iPhoto and Adobe Photoshop. The application takes the concept of presets (internally known as "processes") one step further, giving them native support, and relying on them as the basis for all photo manipulation.

== Features ==
- Real time (live) editing
- Non-destructive image processing
- Creation and sharing of effects
- Non-linear editing
