= Tal Canal =

Portuguese social networking site

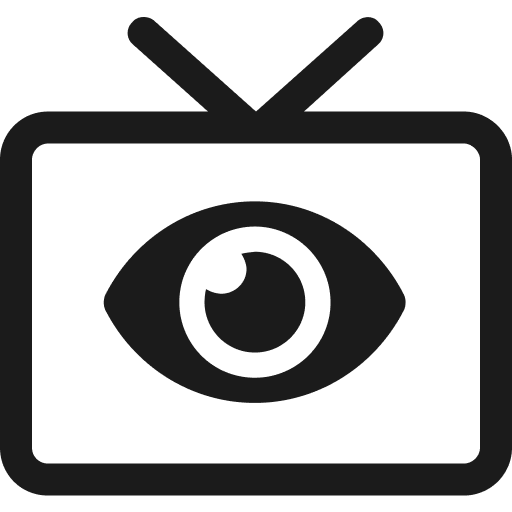
- Website type: Social networking service
- Available in: Portuguese
- Country of origin: Portugal
- Owner: Icónica – Digital Design
- Creators: Tânia Carvalho; André Santos
- Website: talcanal.pt
- Registration: Optional
- Launched: April 2022; 4 years ago
- Current status: Active

Tal Canal is a Portuguese social networking site with an emphasis on sharing and discussing content within communities. Users can share content, such as links, text, images, and videos, in user-created communities called "canais" (Portuguese for channels), which are centered on a particular topic. Users can then comment and vote on the content to discuss it. The use and features of site are similar to those of Reddit.

In addition to the communities there are other features, such as games, a news aggregator, chat rooms, and a chatbot.

== History ==
Tal Canal was created by Tânia Carvalho, a designer, and André Santos, a programmer, who together form the company "Icónica – Digital Design". The social network was initially conceived in August 2021 and launched in April 2022.

The name of the social network was inspired by the Portuguese television programme "O Tal Canal", created by Herman José and broadcast by RTP.

== Overview ==
=== Canais ===
The site focuses on "canais", communities on various topics such as films, TV series, music, art, video games, technology, photography, among others, where users share and discuss content. Users can choose which "canais" they want to follow, and therefore the type of content they want to see. Users can also create and moderate their own "canais".

Published content can be commented on and also voted on by users. There are positive votes and negative votes, and the balance of the votes is called "carma". A user with a negative "carma" may have their posts and comments rejected, depending on the community.

Among the various "canais", the one with the highest levels of user interaction is the "Pergunta-me tudo" (Portuguese for Ask me everything) community. On this community, users post questions that are answered by a guest. Guests who have taken part include illusionist Luís de Matos and Portuguese mathematician Inês Guimarães, also known as MathGurl.

=== Other features ===
In addition to the "canais", there is also:

- A section where games can be played on the website. One of the games included is "Quina", which is similar to Wordle, where players try to guess a five-letter European Portuguese word in nine attempts.
- A news section where news articles from Portugal on different subjects such as sports, politics, technology, among others, are aggregated.
- A chatroom section, called "Chat da Treta", to chat with a random user.
- An artificial intelligence chatbot, called "Chat Genial", that is similar to ChatGPT. It can generate text and images, and interpret prompts in Portuguese and English, with a limit of thirty prompts per day.

== See also ==
- Reddit
