= Marco Polo (app) =

Video messaging and video hosting service mobile app

- Original authors: Michal Bortnik, Vlada Bortnik
- Developer: Joya Communications Inc.
- Release: December 2012
- Stable release: iOS 0.14.202 (April 29, 2019; 7 years ago) Android 0.219.0 (April 29, 2019; 7 years ago) [±]
- Operating system: Cross-platform
- Available in: Multilingual
- Type: Instant messaging and social media
- Website: www.marcopolo.me

Marco Polo is a video messaging and video hosting service mobile app. The app was created in 2014 by Joya Communications. The app markets itself as a video walkie talkie, allowing asynchronous video conversations without requiring the recipient(s) to be live.

== History ==
The app originated as part of a broader effort by its founders to help families stay connected across long distance. It was created in 2014 by Joya Communications, whos founders are Vlada Bortnik and Michal Bortnik. Prior to launching Marco Polo as a video messaging platform, the company experimented with a location-sharing application that allowed users to send their real-time location to selected contacts. The platform functions as a "video walkie-talkie", allowing users to send video messages that can be viewed and responded to at any time.

By 2016, the app had begun attracting venture capitalists and was noted for its similarity to other social video apps, combining elements of messaging and social interaction without requiring real-time participation. As of 2020, Marco Polo had secured approximately $27 million in private investment.

During the COVID-19 pandemic, Marco Polo reported a 1,147% increase in new sign-ups, with use from noteworthy figures like Pink and Ice-T. Sarah Silverman and Tiffany Haddish talk to each other on the app.
