= Fieldoo =

- Website type: Social network service
- Available in: Multilingual
- Area served: Worldwide
- Industry: Internet
- Website: www.fieldoo.com
- Registration: Required
- Launched: February 25, 2013
- Current status: Active

Fieldoo is a business-oriented social networking service used for professional networking in association football. It was founded in Slovenia in March 2012 and launched on 25 February 2013. As of April 2018, Fieldoo has more than 350,000 members in over 200 countries and territories.

The site is available in 7 languages, including English, French, German, Italian, Portuguese, Brazilian Portuguese and Spanish.

== Features ==
The purpose of the site is to allow registered football players to create their on-line curriculum vitae (CV), connect with other football players, agents, scouts and clubs and apply on market posts posted by agents, scouts and clubs. Registered agents, scouts and clubs can connect with registered football players, other agents, scouts and clubs and publish various market posts.

=== Player profile ===
Fieldoo, football career network, went public with a beta player platform in August 2012. The platform is free, although players can pay for premium account.

- Users can create, edit and update their CV and share it with agents, scouts and clubs.
- Users can record their season and career highlights, statistics and milestones.
- Users can connect with team-mates and other players.
- Users can apply on market offers from agents, scouts and football clubs.

=== Agents, scouts and club representative profile ===
Fieldoo officially launched with an agent platform in February 2013. The platform has a free trial period of 90-days for agents, scouts and clubs.

- Users can search for and connect with football players.
- Users can review players' CV's.
- Users can connect and cooperate with other agents, scouts and clubs.
- Users can publish the market posts for co-operation or market post searching for, or offering football players.

=== Market ===
Agents, scouts and clubs can post various market posts in the market section. Football players, agents, scouts and clubs can apply on market posts according to the type of the post. Market posts are divided in:

- Trial/Camp/Academy posts
- Need/Offer player posts
- Agent partnership posts

== Minguella Challenge ==
In September 2013 Fieldoo launched a challenge to provide their users a chance to sign a contract with a club from the Spanish league. In collaboration with a Spanish football agent Jose Maria Minguella that represented Messi, Maradona, Romario, Rivaldo and Guardiola, Fieldoo reviewed more than 5.000 applicants for the Minguella Challenge. The two finalists went on a trial to Segunda division club Girona FC and the winner Jordi Pascual signed a professional contract with the club.

== Reception ==
The website was featured by many worldwide media outlets, such as France football, Yahoo Eurosport, The Huffington Post. The Next Web described it as AngelList for soccer professionals, while Goal.com called it a game-changing network for the soccer industry.
