= 23snaps =

Social network and photo sharing service

23snaps Ltd.
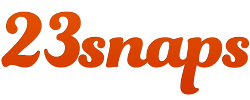
- Company type: Private
- Website type: Social networking, Photo sharing, Video sharing
- Available in: English
- Founded: London, United Kingdom
- Headquarters: London, {{{location_country}}}
- Area served: Worldwide
- Founders: Ivailo Jordanov; Yury Tereshchenko
- Key people: Ivailo Jordanov; Yury Tereshchenko; Andrew Kempe; Meaghan Fitzgerald; Dimitar Lazarov
- Employees: 20
- Website: www.23snaps.com
- Registration: Required
- Users: 300,000
- Launched: June 2012
- Current status: Active

23snaps Ltd. is a free, private social network for users to upload photos, videos, measurements and stories of their children to a digital journal and privately share those updates with other family members or close friends. 23snaps is available online and on mobile devices and launched 1 June 2012.

23snaps was initially available as an iPhone application and a website, and later released apps for Android, iPad, and Windows 8. The company competes with other private photo sharing services for families such as Notabli, Tinybeans and social networks that allow photo sharing such as Instagram and Facebook.

The company is based in London, and was founded by former Espotting executive Ivailo Jordanov and Yury Tereshchenko. The company is self-funded by the founders. 23snaps generates revenue through the sale of photo books and photo prints.

In November 2013, 23snaps announced that the service had passed half a million users in 179 countries.

== Service ==
Users register for a free 23snaps account and create profiles for their children within the app. They can add photos, metrics like height and weight, and make status updates. They then invite only close family and friends to view this content of their children. This content will appear in the news feeds of their authorized connections, and be sent to connections by email depending on the user's settings. A user can share photos and updates with someone who does not have a 23snaps account by inviting them to receive updates by email only.

While there is no limit to the number of connections that a user can add on 23snaps, founder Ivailo Jordanov says that they expect most users to have a "group of approximately 5 to 10 people that can’t get enough of their updates, photos, videos etc., and outside of that group 'over sharing' is an irritation." The service's intention is to provide a secure place to share photos with a select group of family members to counter parental concerns about online privacy and copyright issues.

On 1 May 2013, 23snaps expanded the service to allow users to purchase photo books and photo prints of their content from the app. Stories, a new feature that allows users to combine photos, videos and text to create a multimedia story within their news feed, launched on 7 March 2014.

== Awards ==
23snaps was selected by The Next Web as the best photo, video or camera app of 2012 and by ZDNet as one of 2012's top apps of the year. In June 2013, 23snaps was named Best Family App in the Loved by Parent Awards and in November 2013, 23snaps was selected as both the Best Lifestyle App and People's Choice in the Lifestyle App Category in the Lovie Awards hosted and judged by the International Academy of Digital Arts and Sciences.

On 12 February, The Next Web announced that 23snaps had been selected for The Next Web Boost program, which provides exposure and support for promising European startups and on 25 March, Red Herring named 23snaps as one of the 2014 Red Herring 100 European Finalists.
