= Fishbrain =

Social media app for fisherman

- Release: 2010; 16 years ago
- Operating system: iOS 15.0 or later; Android 10.0 or later
- Size: 154.4 MB
- Available in: English, French, Japanese, Portuguese, Spanish, Swedish
- Type: Photo and Sports
- Website: www.fishbrain.com

Fishbrain is a mobile app and social media platform made for use by fishers.

Its features include map-based tools, social networking, fishing forecasts including weather, lunar cycles, tidal charts, map functionality, predicted fish activity, analysis of species behavior, and suggestions on fishing gear.

== History ==
Fishbrain was created by Jens Lindman and Johan Attby, and launched in 2010 as a free mobile app, and has expanded to include utility functions for recreational fishing with some of its features available for a subscription. The Fishbrain app is downloadable from the App Store and Google Play and has been made available for iPhone, iPad, and Android devices.

In 2019, Fishbrain added a marketplace where anglers can buy fishing gear.

The platform has a user base of about 11 million users, allowing users to access data on species and migratory patterns. Fishbrain has worked with governmental agencies to help identify endangered fish species and how climate is impacting behavioral patterns.

Fishbrain has received multiple rounds of funding to support its expansion, including investments from venture capital firms such as B Capital, Softbank Ventures Asia, and Industrifonden. Most recently, the company raised a Series B round of $13.5 million USD in 2018.
