= Bazaart =

Image editing app

- Industry: Graphic design, Software
- Founded: 2012; 14 years ago in Israel
- Website: www.bazaart.com

Bazaart is an AI-powered design platform with image and video editing capabilities for iOS, Android, MacOS, and the web.

== History ==
Bazaart was founded in 2012 in Israel. In April 2012, Bazaart launched a Facebook app called Pinvolve, which converts Facebook Pages into Pinterest pinboards. From June to August 2012, it participated in the DreamIt startup accelerator in New York and raised $25,000 from the accelerator.

In July 2012, it launched its first version as an iPad app connected to Pinterest.

In December 2013, it pivoted and launched a major version of its app, a "social" photoshop that allowed users to edit images which could be pulled in from the camera roll, social networks, and other sources.

In July 2014, Bazaart reached one million downloads and in December was selected by Apple as Best of 2014.

In 2015, Bazaart added Photoshop integration in a partnership with Adobe. In September 2020, Bazaart launched an Android app. In December 2020, Bazaart was selected by Google as Best of 2020.

In January 2022, Bazaart added video editing capabilities.

In 2023, the platform added AI-powered backgrounds and video background removal features.
