= Gapo =

Vietnam social media website

- Screenshot of a website
- Website type: Social networking service
- Available in: Vietnamese
- Area served: Vietnam
- Creators: Hà Trung Kiên; Duong Vi Khoa
- CEO: Hà Trung Kiên
- Website: www.gapo.vn
- Registration: Required
- Users: 2 million (September 2019)
- Launched: July 23, 2019; 7 years ago
- Current status: Active

Gapo is a Vietnamese social networking service based in Hanoi, Vietnam. Users are able to create a personal profile and share text, photos and videos with others on the platform. Users can also use Gapo for live streaming, instant messaging, blogging, and online payments.

Gapo was launched in July 2019 by Hà Trung Kiên and Duong Vi Khoa.

== History ==
Gapo was founded in response to calls for Vietnam's Communist-led government to produce a domestic alternative to social media giants like Facebook and Google. Gapo officially launched on July 23, 2019 at an event in Hanoi.

The company received 500 billion đồng (US$22 million) in funding from technology corporation G-Group to be utilized in the first phase of development. They also partnered with Sony Music Entertainment to provide music content to its services.

== Features ==
Gapo features a news feed for posting content, livestreaming, instant messaging, and blogging.

It also allows users to pay online and access public services.

== Reception ==
Within two days of launch, Gapo received about 200,000 registrations. By September 2019, the user base increased to one million.

Upon launch, Gapo experienced significant technical difficulties. Users complained about the inability to sign up for a new account and said that certain functions were not available for use at launch. This issue caused Gapo to temporarily suspend their services in order to perform upgrades and bug fixes. Gapo relaunched the next day, though many users reported that the access speed decreased.

The mobile app also received mixed reviews from users in both the App Store and the Google Play Store, with an average rating of 3.1 and 3.5, respectively.

Most users found the app to be a knockoff of Facebook, although some users praised the app for being locally developed.

=== Expert opinions on platform viability ===
Le Hong Hiep of the ISEAS - Yusof Ishak Institute was doubtful that a Vietnamese-owned social network service could be as powerful as a foreign-based service, stating that Vietnam might not be able to develop a viable social media network to compete with the likes of Facebook or Google. Others, like blogger Ann Chi, said that, due to local players complying with local censorship policy, there is a chance that locals might not trust Gapo and other local services in light of possible surveillance.

Regarding the targeted user base figure for the end of 2019 and 2021, experts cautioned that the company might need an additional trillion đồng of funding to reach its planned user base targets. In response, the company stated that Gapo was never meant to compete with Facebook, but instead noted that the main difference between Gapo and Facebook is that Gapo provides a personalized user experience through customization.

== Censorship ==
Gapo has the right to censor posts and news that are deemed offensive and inaccurate by users or not approved by the censorship curators.
