= Skoob =

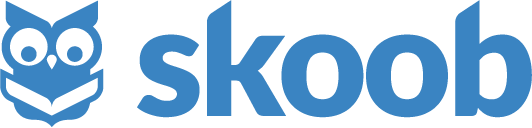
- Available in: Brazilian Portuguese
- Creator: Lindenberg Moreira
- Website: www.skoob.com.br
- Users: 4,000,000
- Launched: 2009
- Current status: Online

Skoob is a collaborative social network for Brazilian readers, launched in January 2009 by developer Lindenberg Moreira. Without advertising, the site became a meeting point for readers and writers who exchange tips about books and organize meetings in bookstores. The network allows interaction with other social networks, such as Facebook and Twitter, as well as popular e-commerce stores in Brazil, such as: Americanas.com, Saraiva, and Submarino.

Skoob's name comes from the English word "books" spelled backwards. Through free registration, the user creates a profile showing what books they are reading or rereading, have read, want to read, or are no longer reading, thus forming a "virtual bookshelf". Users can also add missing titles and share their views on the books via assessments and reviews. On January 27, 2012, a survey was released that indicates that Skoob had more than 1.200.000 users.
