= Fyuse =

Spatial photography app for capturing and sharing interactive 3D images

- Developer: Fyusion Inc.
- Release: 2014; 12 years ago
- Operating system: Android, iOS
- Website: fyu.se

Fyuse is a spatial photography app which lets users capture and share interactive 3D images. By tilting or swiping one's smartphone, one can view such "fyuses" from various angles — as if one were walking around an object or subject.

The app blends photography and video to create an interactive medium and was first published for iOS in April 2014. The Android version was released at the end of 2014.

== The app ==
Fyuse lets users capture panoramas, selfies, and full 360° views of objects and allows one to view captured moments from different angles. It has its own personal gallery, social network and standalone web integration.

With the app, Fyusion also created a social networking platform similar to Instagram. Fyuses can be shared, commented on, liked and re-shared to one's followers (called Echoes). One can build a network of followers and with engagement tracking, one can see how many times an image has been interacted with The images can also be saved for private, offline view, or shared to other social networks, like Facebook or Twitter, or embedded on a website where the images can be interacted with by desktop users via dragging the mouse. Furthermore, in the compass tab other fyuses can be discovered using the app's system of tags and categories. One's Fyuse feed is prepopulated with top users, and one can follow people to see when they post a new fyuse. The app will also find one's friends if one signs up with Facebook or connects it with one's Twitter account.

To create a fyuse one moves around a person or object with one's phone's camera in one direction or moving/tilting one's phone around while holding one's finger on the screen.

By combining photography and video the app allows one to capture moments that one may not have otherwise been able to capture by recording not one moment in time but stitched together little moments. According to Fyusion CEO Radu Rusu, a photo freezes a moment in time, while a video captures moments in a linear timeline — both still flat, when viewed. A fyuse image captures a moment in space, where one can not only see one side of something, but also around it.

When it is done rendering, fyuses can also be edited – one can trim the fyuse for length and edit the brightness, contrast, exposure, saturation and sharpness. One can also add a vignette and apply a filters, with options to adjust their intensity. After editing, one can write a description, add hashtags, and tag parts of the fyuse before one can (voluntarily) publish and share it.

Version 1.0 has been described as "alpha prototype" and version 2.0 was released on 17 December 2014.

Version 3.0 introduced 3D tagging by which users can layer 3D graphic that animate accordingly with each interaction to add some context to the content.

Version 4.0 was released on December 21, 2016 for iOS.

Since January 2016 (v3.2) the app allows the export of fyuses as Live Photos.

The app has also been described as a more sophisticated version of 3D stickers and flip images.

== Applications ==
The app has many applications for e-commerce such as for fashion designers who want to showcase a garment from every angle, or real estate listings and Airbnb-type sites that want to make their rental properties seem as enticing as possible.

The app can also be used for interactive art, 360° panoramas and selfies.

== History ==
San Francisco-based Fyusion Inc.'s three founders — Radu B. Rusu, CTO Stefan Holzer, and VP of Engineering Stephen Miller — worked together at Willow Garage, the robotics research lab started by early Google employee Scott Hassan in the area of "personal robotics" — Hassan decided to turn the lab into more of an incubator, suggesting that the members spin off their technologies into consumer-facing enterprises. Rusu first set out with an open-source 3D perception software startup called Open Perception. Fyusion was officially founded in 2013, and soon after Rusu and his cofounders patented the technology for spatial photography. The company closed a seed funding round at the end of May, raising $3.35 million from investors, including an angel investment from Sun Microsystems cofounder Andreas Bechtolsheim. In 2014 the Fyuse team consisted of 13 employees, mostly engineers and designers, recruited from around the globe. In March 2015 the team displayed their app at Katy Perry's premiere for the movie "Prismatic World Tour on Epix" where Perry also took Fyuse for a test run.

== Augmented reality ==
In September 2016 Fyusion unveiled its platform for creating augmented reality content using ones smartphone. It takes the images from ones smartphone and converts them into 3D holographic images, which one can then view on an AR headset. According to Rusu "by making it easy for people to capture their surroundings on any mobile device, [Fyusion is] revolutionizing the way that people view the world around them" and also states that for "AR to be successful, anyone should be able to create content for it" opposed to the current "small number of content creators and an even smaller number of hardware players". According to him "the applications of [Fyusion's] technology for consumers and businesses are incredibly limitless". The platform uses the company's patented 3D spatio-temporal platform that uses advanced sensor fusion, machine learning and computer vision algorithms and part of the platform is built into the Fyuse app. Before committing to releasing a separate consumer product the company intends to wait until the HoloLens device becomes available to the public. Until then any Fyuse representation created using Fyuse is AR ready and will be able to be shown in HoloLens in the future.

== Fyuse - Point of No Return ==
Fyuse - Point of No Return is a science fiction short advert for Fyuse 3.0 in which Fyuse's digital medium is extrapolated into the future. In the film a woman uses a mini scanning-drone to 3D scan a tree with Fyuse and later recreate it as an augmented reality object at another place.
