= Growth Enterprise Market =

Growth Enterprise Market (GEM; Chinese: 創業板) is a board of the Stock Exchange of Hong Kong for growth companies that do not fulfill the requirements of profitability or track record for the main board of the exchange. Opened 1999.

GEM operates on the philosophy of "buyers beware" and "let the market decide" based on a strong disclosure regime. Its rules and requirements are designed to foster a culture of self compliance by listed issuers and sponsors in the discharge of their respective responsibilities. The following major features are to support this philosophy: Greater, More Frequent and Timely Disclosure

GEM requires a listing applicant to disclose in detail its past business history and its future business plans which are key components of the listing documents. After listing, a GEM issuer is required to make half yearly comparison of its business progress with the business plan for the first 2 financial years, publish quarterly accounts in addition to half yearly and annual accounts and a shorter period is allowed to make available these information to the public. To allow market participants easy access to information, GEM has a separate website which provides comprehensive information covering all aspects of the market including company announcements and other information of listed issuers, trade prices and market statistics. Since 1999, more than 267 companies have raised more than HKD 40 Billion in this market.

== GEM Sponsor Scheme ==
In recognition of the pivotal role that a GEM sponsor plays in the listing process, a GEM sponsor is required to satisfy a set of detailed eligibility criteria and assume clear responsibilities in the discharge of its duties. Amongst its duties, a GEM sponsor is required to conduct due diligence and to satisfy itself, to the best of its knowledge and belief and having made due and careful enquiries, that proper disclosures have been made.

== Corporate Governance ==
From the time of listing, an issuer is required to establish a strong corporate governance base to facilitate its compliance with the GEM Listing Rules and adherence to proper business practices. These measures include the appointment of a qualified accountant to supervise its finance and accounting functions, designating an executive director as the compliance officer, appointment of 2 independent directors and the establishment of an audit committee. In the first 2 years after listing, a GEM issuer is also required to retain a sponsor to advise and assist the company and its directors in the discharge of their listing obligations.

== Role of the Exchange ==
At the time of listing the Exchange reviews the listing documents of an applicant to ensure that they comply with the requirements of the Companies Ordinance and the GEM Listing Rules. However, the Exchange does not assess the commercial viability of any applicant. The Exchange similarly reviews all public announcements made by an issuer after it has been listed. However, the responsibility for the correctness, quality and sufficiency of the disclosed information made by an issuer rests ultimately with the issuer and its directors.

In addition, the Exchange actively monitors the trading of securities on GEM and the compliance with the GEM Listing Rules by issuers and sponsors. It will undertake strong enforcement and institute appropriate disciplinary actions if necessary where breaches of the GEM Listing Rules are identified.

== Market Consultation ==
A market consultation is initiated by the Exchange to review the GEM and propose changes to the GEM and Main Board Listing Rules in June 2017. Review and Proposals include name change of GEM, more stringent admission and Post-IPO Lock up requirements and suspension of the streamlined Process for GEM Transfers.

== See also ==
- Alternative Investment Market (AIM) of London.
