= Social animal (disambiguation) =

Social animal refers to an animal which is highly interactive with other members of its species

The Social Animal, Social Animal or Social Animals can also refer to:

- The Social Animal (Aronson book), 1972
- The Social Animal (Brooks book), 2011
- Social Animals (2018 comedy film), an American comedy film
- Social Animals (2018 documentary film), an American documentary film

== See also ==
- Socialization
- Socialization (economics)
