= Instagram =

Social media platform owned by Meta

- App icon used since May 2022 and wordmark used since August 2026

- Wikipedia's Instagram page on October 27, 2026.
- Original authors: Kevin Systrom; Mike Krieger
- Developer: Meta Platforms
- Release: October 6, 2010 (16 years ago)
- Operating system: iOS; iPadOS; Android; Fire OS; Microsoft Windows; Web browser
- Available in: 33 languages
- List of languages: Arabic; Chinese (Simplified and Traditional); Croatian; Czech; Danish; Dutch; English; Finnish; French; German; Greek; Hindi; Hungarian; Indonesian; Italian; Japanese; Korean; Malay; Norwegian; Persian; Polish; Portuguese; Romanian; Russian; Slovak; Spanish; Swedish; Tagalog; Thai; Turkish; Ukrainian; Vietnamese
- License: Proprietary
- Website: instagram.com
- Repository: github.com/instagram

Instagram (Note: Legally as Instagram, LLC, registered in Delaware, formerly as Instagram, Inc., often colloquially shortened by users to the terms Insta, the Gram, and IG, which is also used as a URL shortener under the name IG.ME as ig.me/u/example for usernames and ig.me/p/example for posts and reels.) is an American photo and short-form video sharing social networking service owned by Meta Platforms. It allows users to upload media that can be edited with filters, be organized by hashtags, and be associated with a location via geographical tagging. Posts can be shared publicly or with preapproved followers. Users can browse other users' content by tags and locations, view trending content, like photos, and follow other users to add their content to a personal feed. A Meta-operated image-centric social media platform, it is available on iOS, Android, Windows, and the Web. Users can take photos and edit them using built-in filters and other tools, then share them on other social media platforms like Facebook. It supports 33 languages including English, Hindi, Spanish, French, Japanese, and Korean.

Instagram was originally distinguished by allowing content to be framed only in a square (1:1) aspect ratio of 640 pixels to match the display width of the iPhone at the time. In 2015, this restriction was eased with an increase to 1080 pixels. It also added messaging features, the ability to include multiple images or videos in a single post, and a Stories feature—similar to its main competitor at the time, Snapchat, which allowed users to post their content to a sequential feed, with each post accessible to others for 24 hours. As of January 2019, Stories was used by 500 million people daily.

Instagram was launched for iOS in October 2010 by Kevin Systrom and the Brazilian software engineer Mike Krieger. It rapidly gained popularity, reaching 1 million registered users in two months, 10 million in a year, and 1 billion in June 2018. In April 2012, Facebook acquired the service for approximately US$1 billion in cash and stock. The Android version of Instagram was released in April 2012, followed by a feature-limited desktop interface in November 2012, a Fire OS app in June 2014, an app for Windows 10 in October 2016, and an app for iPadOS in September 2025. Although often admired for its success and influence, Instagram has also been criticized for negatively affecting teens' mental health, its policy and interface changes, its alleged censorship, and illegal and inappropriate content uploaded by users.

== History ==
Burbn logo from October 21, 2009, to October 6, 2010

Instagram began development in San Francisco as Burbn, a mobile check-in app created by Kevin Systrom and Mike Krieger. On March 5, 2010, Systrom closed a $500,000 (equivalent to $719,500 in 2025) seed funding round with Baseline Ventures and Andreessen Horowitz while working on Burbn. Realizing that it was too similar to Foursquare, they refocused their app on photo-sharing, which had become a popular feature among its users. They renamed it Instagram, a portmanteau of instant camera and telegram.

=== 2010–2011: Beginnings and major funding ===
Instagram wordmark from October 6, 2010, to May 2, 2013

Josh Riedel joined the company in October as Community Manager, Shayne Sweeney joined in November as an engineer, and Jessica Zollman joined as a Community Evangelist in August 2011.

The first Instagram post was a photo of South Beach Harbor at Pier 38, posted by Mike Krieger at 5:26 p.m. on July 16, 2010. On October 6, 2010, the Instagram iOS app was officially released through the App Store. In February 2011, it was reported that Instagram had raised $7 million (equivalent to $9,869,480 in 2025) in Series A funding from a variety of investors, including Benchmark Capital, Jack Dorsey, Chris Sacca (through Capital fund), and Adam D'Angelo. The deal valued Instagram at around $20 million. In April 2012, Instagram raised $50 million (equivalent to $69,200,000 in 2025) from venture capitalists with a valuation of $500 million (equivalent to $692,000,000 in 2025). Joshua Kushner was the second largest investor in Instagram's Series B fundraising round, leading his investment firm, Thrive Capital, to double its money after the sale to Facebook.

=== 2012–2014: Additional platforms and acquisition by Facebook ===
On April 3, 2012, Instagram released a version of its app for Android phones, and it was downloaded more than one million times in less than one day. The Android app has since received two significant updates: first, in March 2014, which cut the file size of the app by half and added performance improvements; then in April 2017, to add an offline mode that allows users to view and interact with content without an Internet connection. At the time of the announcement, it was reported that 80% of Instagram's 600 million users were located outside the U.S., and while the aforementioned functionality was live at its announcement, Instagram also announced its intention to make more features available offline, and that they were "exploring an iOS version". On April 9, 2012, Facebook, Inc. (now Meta Platforms) bought Instagram for $1 billion (equivalent to $1.384×10^{9} in 2025) in cash and stock, with a plan to keep the company independently managed. Britain's Office of Fair Trading approved the deal on August 14, 2012, and on August 22, 2012, the Federal Trade Commission in the U.S. closed its investigation, allowing the deal to proceed. On September 6, 2012, the deal between Instagram and Facebook officially closed with a purchase price of $300 million in cash and 23 million shares of stock.

The deal closed just before Facebook's scheduled initial public offering according to CNN. The deal price was compared to the $35 million Yahoo! paid for Flickr in 2005. Mark Zuckerberg said Facebook was "committed to building and growing Instagram independently". According to Wired, the deal netted Systrom $400 million.

Instagram wordmark from May 2, 2013, to 2015

In November 2012, Instagram launched website profiles, allowing anyone to see user feeds from a web browser with limited functionality, as well as a selection of badges, and web widget buttons to link to profiles. Since the app's launch it had used the Foursquare API technology to provide named location tagging. In March 2014, Instagram started to test and switch the technology to use Facebook Places.

=== 2015–2017: Redesign and Windows app ===
Instagram wordmark from 2015 to May 11, 2016

In June 2015, the desktop website user interface was redesigned to become more flat and minimalistic, but with more screen space for each photo and to resemble the layout of Instagram's mobile website. Furthermore, one row of pictures only has three instead of five photos to match the mobile layout. The slideshow banner on the top of profile pages, which simultaneously slide-showed seven picture tiles of pictures posted by the user, alternating at different times in a random order, has been removed. In addition, the formerly angular profile pictures became circular.

Instagram icon from 2016 to 2022, when it was updated to include more saturated colors

In April 2016, Instagram released a Windows 10 Mobile app, after years of demand from Microsoft and the public to release an app for the platform. The platform previously had a beta version of Instagram, first released on November 21, 2013, for Windows Phone 8. The new app added support for videos (viewing and creating posts or stories, and viewing live streams), album posts and direct messages. Similarly, an app for Windows 10 personal computers and tablets was released in October 2016. In May, Instagram updated its mobile website to allow users to upload photos, and to add a "lightweight" version of the Explore tab.

Instagram wordmark from May 11, 2016, to August 13, 2026

On May 11, 2016, Instagram revamped its design, adding a black-and-white flat design theme for the app's user interface, and a less skeuomorphistic, more abstract, "modern" and colorful icon. Rumors of a redesign first started circulating in April, when The Verge received a screenshot from a tipster, but at the time, an Instagram spokesperson simply told the publication that it was only a concept. On December 6, 2016, Instagram introduced comment liking. However, unlike post likes, the user who posted a comment does not receive notifications about comment likes in their notification inbox. Uploaders can optionally decide to deactivate comments on a post.

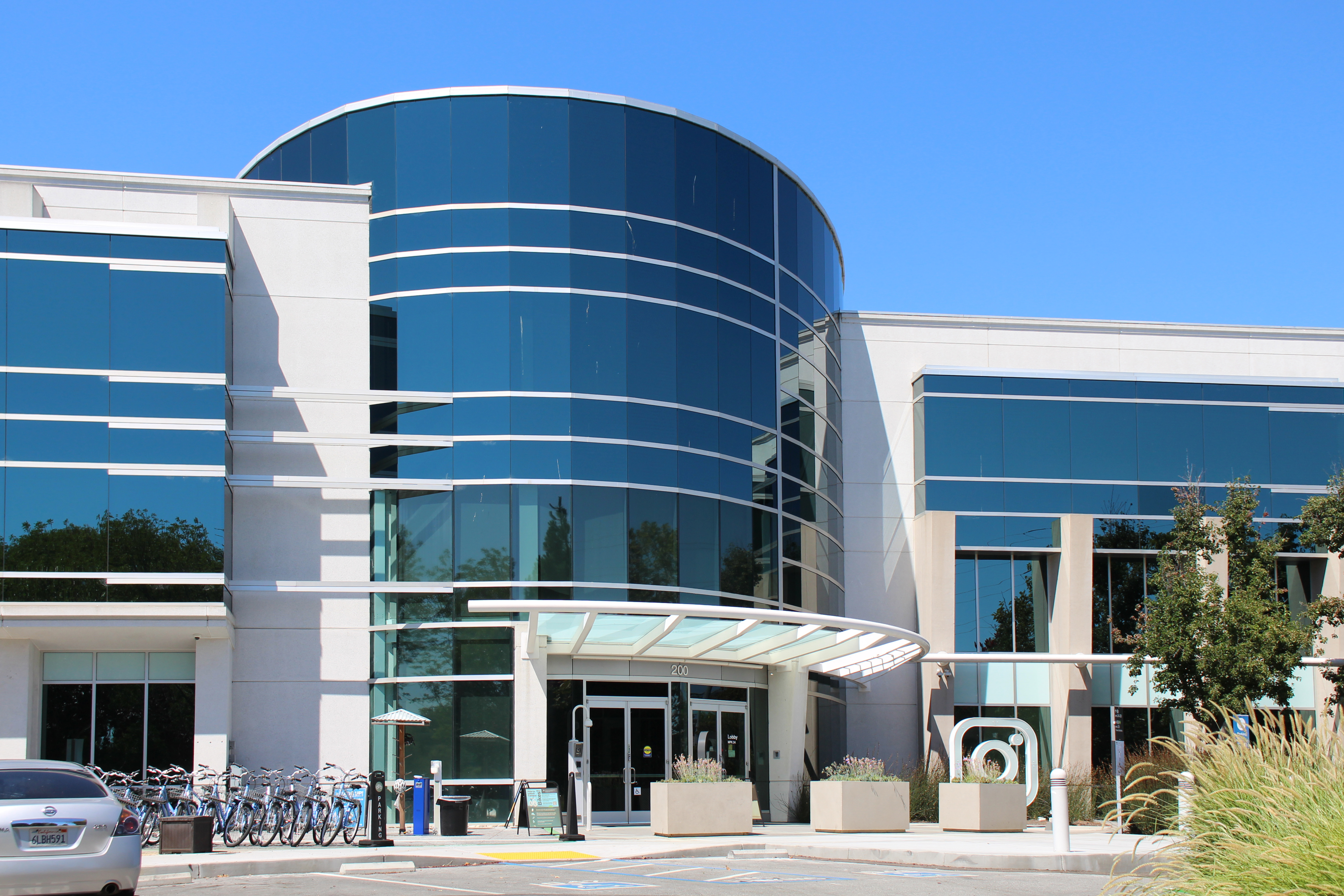
Instagram moved headquarters into its new, three-story office in Menlo Park, California (formerly home to PGP Corporation), on October 6, 2016, to celebrate its sixth birthday

The mobile website allows uploading pictures since May 4, 2017. Image filters and the ability to upload videos were not introduced then. On April 30, 2019, the Windows 10 Mobile app was discontinued, though the mobile website remains available as a progressive web application (PWA) with limited functionality. The app remains available on Windows 10 computers and tablets, also updated to a PWA in 2020.

=== 2018–2019: IGTV, removal of the like counter, management changes ===
To comply with the GDPR regulations regarding data portability, Instagram introduced the ability for users to download an archive of their user data in April 2018. IGTV launched on June 20, 2018, as a standalone video application. The application was shut down and removed from app stores in March 2022, citing low usage and a shift to short-form video content. On September 24, 2018, Krieger and Systrom announced in a statement they would be stepping down from Instagram. On October 1, 2018, it was announced that Adam Mosseri would be the new head of Instagram.

During Facebook F8, it was announced that Instagram would, beginning in Canada, pilot the removal of publicly displayed "like" counts for content posted by other users. Like counts would only be visible to the user who originally posted the content. Mosseri stated that this was intended to have users "worry a little bit less about how many likes they're getting on Instagram and spend a bit more time connecting with the people that they care about." It has been argued that low numbers of likes in relativity to others could contribute to a lower self-esteem in users. The pilot began in May 2019, and was extended to 6 other markets in July. The pilot was expanded worldwide in November 2019. Also in July 2019, Instagram announced that it would implement new features designed to reduce harassment and negative comments on the service.

In August 2019, Instagram also began to pilot the removal of the "Following" tab from the app, which had allowed users to view a feed of the likes and comments made by users they follow. The change was made official in October, with head of product Vishal Shah stating that the feature was underused and that some users were "surprised" when they realized their activity was being surfaced in this manner. Instagram later restricted the ability to view public profiles without logging in, prompting users to sign in after viewing a limited number of posts. Following the change, after viewing a number of posts a pop-up requires the user to log in to continue viewing content.

In the same month, Instagram launched a separate app known as Threads. Similar to Snapchat, the app allowed users to communicate through messaging and video chats. It was integrated with Instagram's "Close friends" feature, so that users could send images, photos, and texts privately to others, and also had Instagram's photo editing system embedded into the app. However, Instagram discontinued this version of Threads in December 2021, mainly due to most of its features being rolled out on Instagram itself, as well as low usage compared to other social media applications. Threads was not well-received among Instagram's user base. Since its launch, only approximately 220,000 users globally downloaded the app, which represented less than 0.1% of Instagram's monthly active users.

=== 2020–present ===
In March 2020, Instagram launched a new feature called "Co-Watching". The new feature allows users to share posts with each other over video calls. According to Instagram, they pushed forward the launch of Co-Watching in order to meet the demand for virtually connecting with friends and family due to social distancing as a result of the COVID-19 pandemic.

In August 2020, Instagram began a pivot to video, introducing a new feature called "Reels". The intent was to compete with the video-sharing site TikTok. Instagram also added suggested posts in August 2020. After scrolling through posts from the past 48 hours, Instagram displays endless posts related to their interests from accounts they do not follow. In February 2021, Instagram began testing a new feature called Vertical Stories, said by some sources to be inspired by TikTok. The same month, they also began testing the removal of ability to share feed posts to stories. In March 2021, Instagram launched a new feature in which four people can go live at once. Instagram also announced that adults would not be allowed to message teens who don't follow them as part of a series of new child safety policies.

In May 2021, Instagram began allowing users in some regions to add pronouns to their profile page. On October 4, 2021, Meta services suffered their worst outage since 2008, bringing down Instagram, Facebook, and WhatsApp. Security experts identified the problem as possibly being DNS-related. On March 17, 2022, Zuckerberg confirmed plans to add non-fungible tokens (NFTs) to the platform.

In April 2022, Instagram began testing the removal of the ability to see "recent" posts from various hashtags. This change became permanent and system wide a year later, and now hashtags can only be used to see a selection of curated content from "top" users. These changes are ostensibly an attempt to hinder the spread of misinformation, while Instagram has also repeatedly stated that hashtags do not help posts get views.

In September 2022, Ireland's Data Protection Commission fined the company $402 million under privacy laws recently adopted by the European Union over how it handled the privacy data of minors. After being trialled in mid-2022, Instagram introduced Notes in December 2022. This feature allows users to share updates as short text posts of up to 60 characters with certain people, who can then reply to them using messaging on Instagram.

In February 2023, Instagram introduced a new feature allowing users to browse and post GIFs in their comments. Also in February 2023, Zuckerberg announced that Meta would start selling blue "verified" badges on Instagram and Facebook.

On July 5, 2023, Meta launched Threads, a social network platform connected to Instagram that allows users to make public shortform blog posts comprising text, photos, and videos, as well as to converse with other users and reblog other users' posts. Threads aims to compete with Twitter. In December 2023, Instagram launched a podcast titled "Close Friends Only" featuring conversations among celebrities. The first episode featured rappers Ice Spice and Doja Cat. Subsequent episodes in June and August 2024 featured Reneé Rapp, Rachel Sennott, Megan Thee Stallion and GloRilla.

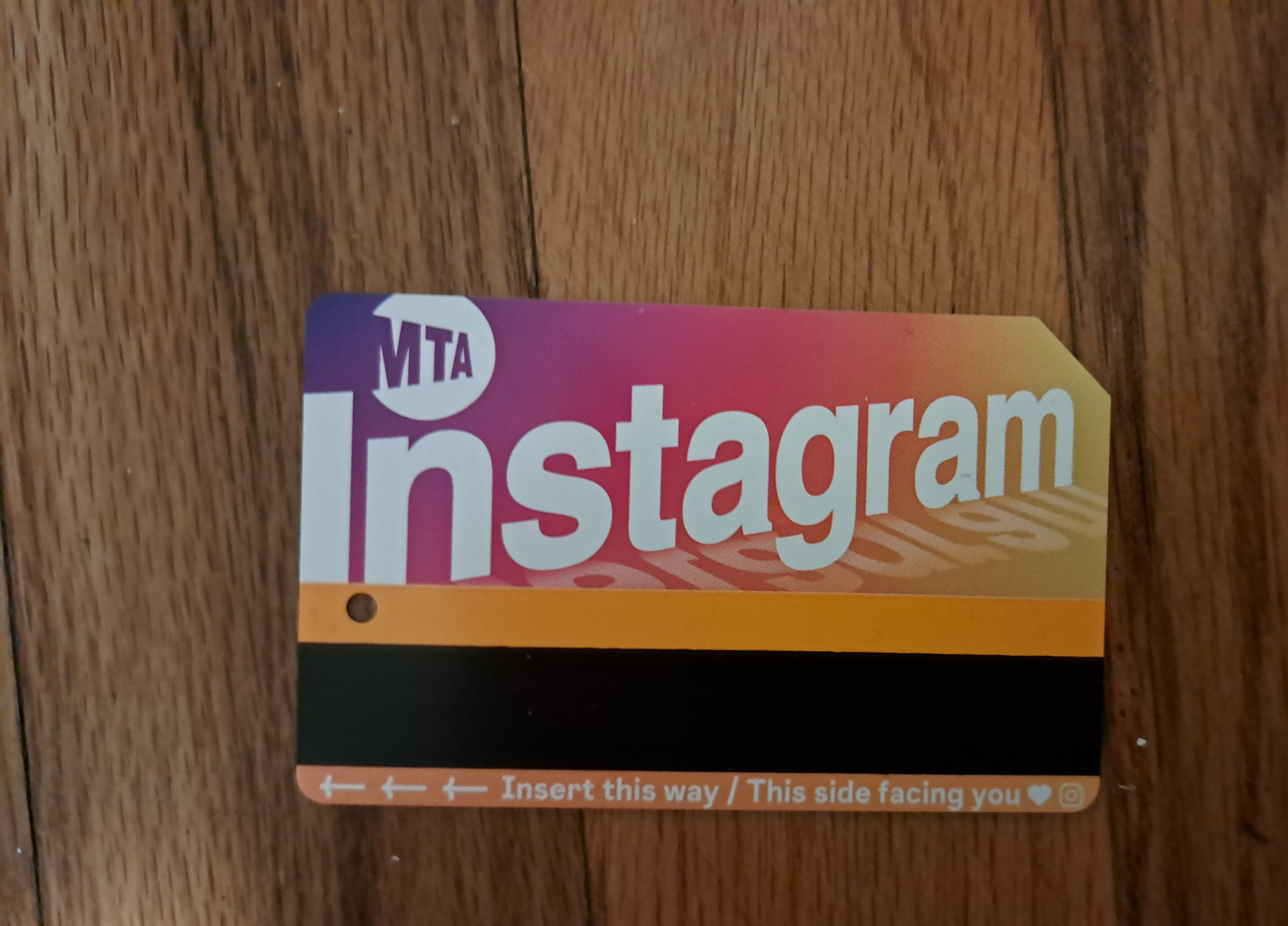
Instagram Metrocard, an advertisement Metrocard, which was the last one New York City Transit Authority did.

In April 2024, Instagram announced that they would start testing new tools "within weeks" to fight sextortion, a form of blackmail involving intimate pictures sent online. On August 2, 2024, Turkey blocked Instagram after the platform deleted posts from users offering condolences for the death of Hamas leader Ismail Haniyeh. In December 2024, Instagram and MTA collaborated and sold Metrocards ft. creators such as New York Nico, Overheard in New York, and SubwayTakes.

On September 3, 2025, Instagram launched a native iPadOS app, which before relied on the iOS app and did not utilize the larger screen size of tablets.

In February 2026, Meta announced a new safety feature on Instagram that will alert parents if their teenage children repeatedly search for content related to suicide or self‑harm, as part of expanded parental supervision tools amid legal scrutiny of its impact on youth.

Meta scheduled an end of support for end-to-end encryption in Instagram direct messaging in May 2026. Following this change, messages are no longer protected by end-to-end encryption and are not exclusively accessible only to the communicating users. As a result, the level of confidentiality in direct messages is reduced compared to fully encrypted communications, and message content may be accessible under certain conditions, depending on applicable policies and regulatory frameworks.

The change prompted concerns among privacy researchers and digital rights commentators regarding reduced message confidentiality and broader implications for messaging privacy and data protection.

In August 2026, Instagram updated its wordmark for the first time in about a decade, replacing its previous script-style lettering with a redesigned typeface that combines script and print elements. The camera icon remained unchanged.

== Features and tools ==
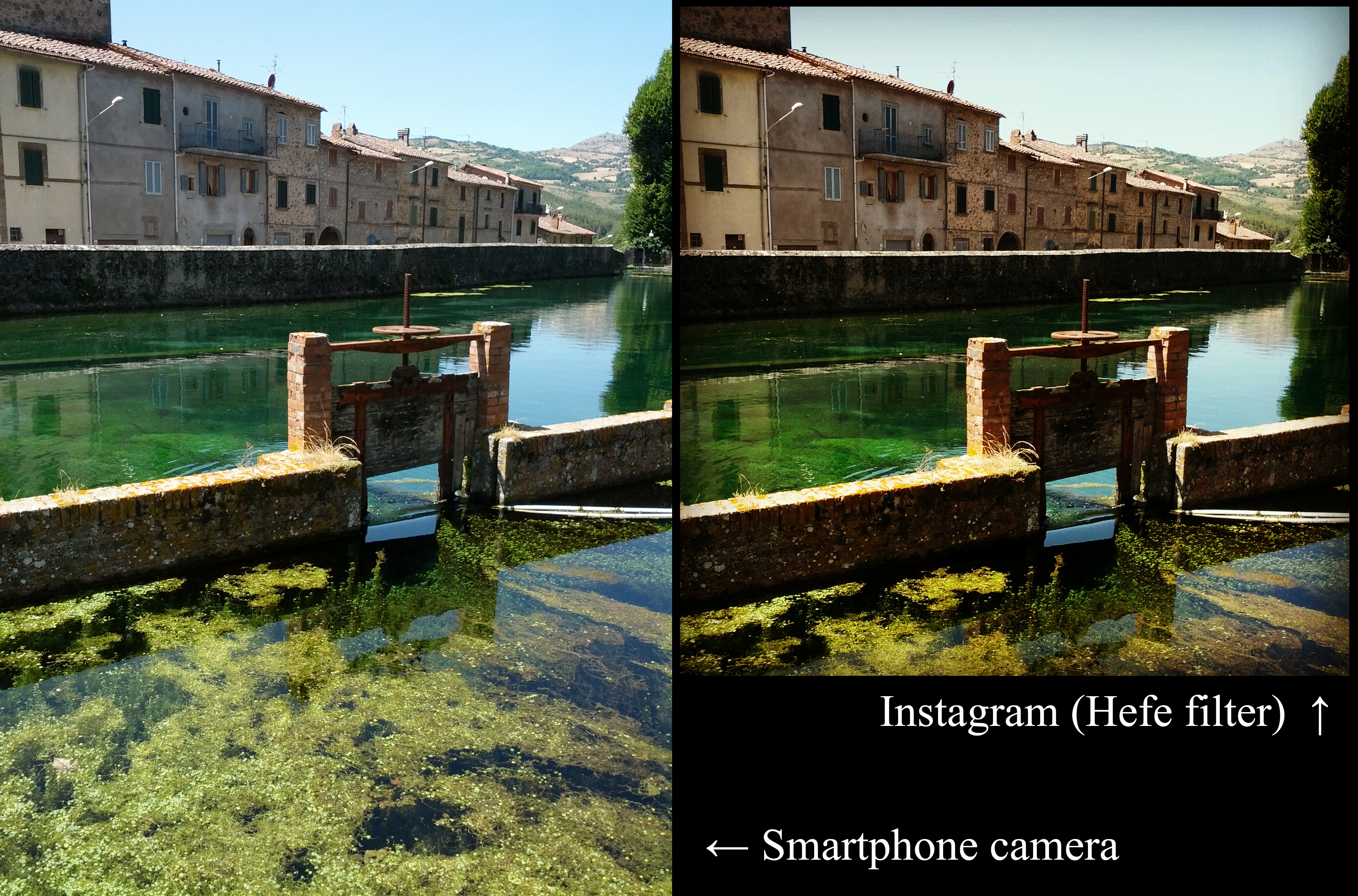
An original photograph (left) is automatically cropped to a square by Instagram, and has a filter added at the selection of the user (right).

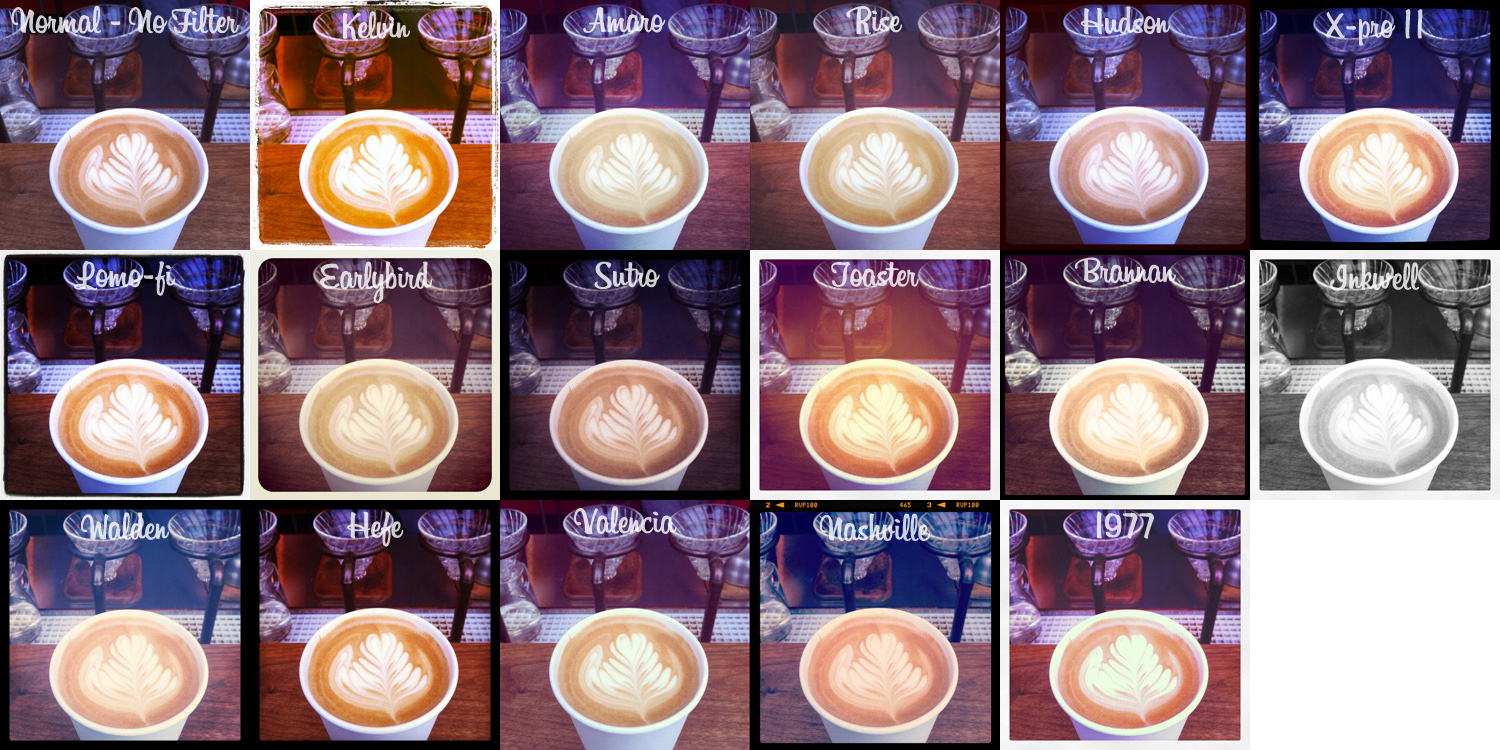
A photo collage of an unprocessed image (top left) modified with the 16 different Instagram filters available in 2011

Users can upload photographs and short videos, follow other users' feeds, and geotag images with the name of a location. Users can set their account as "private", thereby requiring that they approve any new follower requests. Users can connect their Instagram account to other social networking sites, enabling them to share uploaded photos to those sites. In September 2011, a new version of the app included new and live filters, instant tilt–shift, high-resolution photographs, optional borders, one-click rotation, and an updated icon. Photos were initially restricted to a square, 1:1 aspect ratio; since August 2015, the app supports portrait and widescreen aspect ratios as well. Users could formerly view a map of a user's geotagged photos. The feature was removed in September 2016, citing low usage.

Since December 2016, posts can be "saved" into a private area of the app. The feature was updated in April 2017 to let users organize saved posts into named collections. Users can also "archive" their posts in a private storage area, out of visibility for the public and other users. The move was seen as a way to prevent users from deleting photos that don't garner a desired number of "likes" or are deemed boring, but also as a way to limit the "emergent behavior" of deleting photos, which deprives the service of content. In August, Instagram announced that it would start organizing comments into threads, letting users more easily interact with replies.

Since February 2017, up to ten pictures or videos can be included in a single post, with the content appearing as a swipeable carousel. The feature originally limited photos to the square format, but received an update in August to enable portrait and landscape photos instead. In April 2018, Instagram launched its version of a portrait mode called "focus mode", which gently blurs the background of a photo or video while keeping the subject in focus when selected. In November, Instagram began to support Alt text to add descriptions of photos for the visually impaired. They are either generated automatically using object recognition (using existing Facebook technology) or manually specified by the uploader.

On March 1, 2021, Instagram launched a new feature named Instagram Live Rooms, which lets four people go live together. In May 2021, Instagram announced a new accessibility feature for videos on Instagram Reels and Stories to allow creators to place closed captions on their content.

=== Hashtags ===
In January 2011, Instagram introduced hashtags to help users discover both photos and each other. Instagram encourages users to make tags both specific and relevant, rather than tagging generic words like "photo", to make photographs stand out and to attract like-minded Instagram users.

Users on Instagram have created "trends" through hashtags. The trends deemed the most popular on the platform often highlight a specific day of the week to post the material on. Examples of popular trends include #SelfieSunday, in which users post a photo of their faces on Sundays; #MotivationMonday, in which users post motivational photos on Mondays; #TransformationTuesday, in which users post photos highlighting differences from the past to the present; #WomanCrushWednesday, in which users post photos of women they have a romantic interest in or view favorably, as well as its #ManCrushMonday counterpart centered on men; and #ThrowbackThursday, in which users post a photo from their past, highlighting a particular moment.

In December 2017, Instagram began to allow users to follow hashtags, which display relevant highlights of the topic in their feeds. The ability to search "Recent" hashtags was temporarily disabled during the 2020 U.S. elections, to prevent the spread of misinformation. In 2022 this was again tested on some users, and in April 2023 the ability to search recent hashtags was removed entirely. Now, users are only able to see a curated selection of "popular" posts using a given hashtag. Instagram said that this is to prevent abuse and so that hashtags do not help users gain views, but it has been noted that using hashtags is the only free method for a user to reach past their existing followers.

=== Explore ===
In June 2012, Instagram introduced "Explore", a tab inside the app that displays popular photos, photos taken at nearby locations, and search. The tab was updated in June 2015 to feature trending tags and places, curated content, and the ability to search for locations. In April 2016, Instagram added a "Videos You Might Like" channel to the tab, followed by an "Events" channel in August, featuring videos from concerts, sports games, and other live events, followed by the addition of Instagram Stories in October. The tab was later expanded again in November 2016 after Instagram Live launched to display an algorithmically curated page of the "best" Instagram Live videos currently airing. In May 2017, Instagram once again updated the Explore tab to promote public Stories content from nearby places.

=== Photographic filters ===
Instagram offers a number of photographic filters that users can apply to their images. In February 2012, Instagram added a "Lux" filter, an effect that "lightens shadows, darkens highlights and increases contrast". In December 2014, Slumber, Crema, Ludwig, Aden, and Perpetua were five new filters added to the Instagram filter family.

=== Video ===
Initially a purely photo-sharing service, Instagram incorporated 15-second video sharing in June 2013. The addition was seen by some in the technology media as Facebook's attempt at competing with the then-popular video-sharing application Vine. In August 2015, Instagram added support for widescreen videos. In March 2016, Instagram increased the 15-second video limit to one minute. Albums were introduced in February 2017, which allow up to 10 minutes of video to be shared in one post.

==== IGTV ====
IGTV was a vertical video application launched by Instagram in June 2018. Basic functionality is also available within the Instagram app and website. IGTV allows uploads of up to 10 minutes in length with a file size of up to 650 MB, with verified and popular users allowed to upload videos of up to one hour in length with a file size of up to 5.4 GB. The app automatically begins playing videos as soon as it is launched, which CEO Kevin Systrom contrasted to video hosts where one must first locate a video. In March 2022, the application was shut down.

==== Edits ====
Instagram Edits logo

Edits is a video editing application only available on Android and iOS. The app includes some AI features and the ability to post directly to Instagram or Facebook. Users can also view statistics on their videos and see other user's videos that are trending in the Inspiration tab. Announced on January 19, 2025 (as a response to the U.S. government's actions against TikTok and CapCut), which was available for pre-order on the iOS App Store and set for an Android launch in February 2025, and had an initial release date of March 13, 2025, for iOS, after some delays, officially released for both iPhone and Android devices on April 21, 2025.

=== Instagram Reels ===
Instagram Reels logo

Instagram Reels is the short-form section of the American social media platform Instagram. Reels focuses on vertical videos that are less than 90 seconds of duration and various features for user interaction. As of November 2024, Reels averages at 150 billion views a day. Creators earn money based on the amount of views they receive, or through ad revenue.

In November 2019, it was announced that Instagram would start to roll out a new feature to Brazil known as Instagram Reels. It would then expand to France and Germany. Instagram Reels was officially launched in Pakistan in August 2022, two years after its global rollout in August 2020. It functions similarly to the Chinese video service TikTok, focusing on allowing users to create short videos already set to existing sounds from other clips. Users could make up to 15 (later 30) second videos using this feature. Reels also uses existing Instagram filters and editing tools.

In July 2020, Instagram rolled out Reels to India after TikTok was banned in the country. Then, the following month, Reels officially launched in 50 countries including the United States, Canada and United Kingdom. Then in August of that year, Instagram introduced a reels button on the home page. On June 17, 2021, Instagram launched full-screen advertisements in Reels. The ads are similar to regular reels and can run up to 30 seconds. They are distinguished from regular content by the "sponsored" tag under the account name. Despite the "TikTokification" of Reels and the parent company Meta spending millions on courting content creators, user engagement continued to lag way behind TikTok as of 2022. Then Instagram started rolling out a new feature with made Reels up to 90 seconds long beginning in June 2022. After a period of testing, a duration of up to three minutes was announced in January 2025.

On February 26, 2025, Instagram Reels came under fire after numerous users reported a sudden surge in violent and graphic content appearing in their feeds. Meta issued a public apology, stating that a technical error led to the unintended recommendation of such content. A Meta spokesperson explained, "We have fixed an error that caused some users to see content in their Instagram Reels feed that should not have been recommended. We apologize for the mistake."

Since its inception in 2020, the usage of Instagram Reels has continuously increased. In September 2022, Instagram Reels generated over 140 billion views daily. The number of monthly users also increased from 1.5 billion in 2022 to 1.8 billion as of 2024. Researchers from the Guizhou University of Finance and Economics and Western Michigan University found that short-form videos like YouTube Shorts, TikTok, and Instagram Reels may make it easier for young adults and children to develop addictive behavior because short-form videos provide "short bursts of thrills". These researchers found that college students in the U.S. and China watch short-form videos for entertainment, knowledge, and to build social identities.

The Wall Street Journal reported that some parents are concerned about the effects of short-form videos on their children, as there is no way to disable Instagram or set limits. When children watch short-form videos, they learn to expect continual stimulation and fast-paced changes, which can cause problems when engaging in activities that require greater focus, such as reading. Recent studies highlighted the connection between short-form videos such as Instagram Reels and the brain's reward system, specifically dopamine release. According to Dr. Anna Lembke, a psychiatrist and chief of Stanford University's dual diagnosis addiction clinic, brief attention-grabbing videos act as powerful stimuli triggering dopamine surges akin to other addictive behaviors. The rapid and easily consumable nature of short-form videos can elicit high levels of dopamine; since dopamine serves as a motivator rather than a direct source of pleasure, individuals are compelled to seek rewarding activities and become addicted to them. Such neurochemical responses lead to addictive patterns and behaviors, entering a vicious cycle. Digital addiction can lead to shorter attention spans and slower cognitive processing.

=== Instagram Direct ===
In December 2013, Instagram announced Instagram Direct, a feature that lets users interact through private messaging (colloquially called "DM" or "DMs", short for "Direct Message"; in some regions, the messages may be known simply as "direct"/"directs"). Users who follow each other can send private messages with photos and videos, in contrast to the public-only requirement that was previously in place. When users receive a private message from someone they don't follow, the message is marked as pending and the user must accept to see it. Users can send a photo to a maximum of 15 people. The feature received a major update in September 2015, adding conversation threading and making it possible for users to share locations, hashtag pages, and profiles through private messages directly from the news feed. Additionally, users can now reply to private messages with text, emoji or by clicking on a heart icon. A camera inside Direct lets users take a photo and send it to the recipient without leaving the conversation. A new update in November 2016 let users make their private messages "disappear" after being viewed by the recipient, with the sender receiving a notification if the recipient takes a screenshot.

In April 2017, Instagram redesigned Direct to combine all private messages, both permanent and ephemeral, into the same message threads. In May, Instagram made it possible to send website links in messages, and also added support for sending photos in their original portrait or landscape orientation without cropping.

In April 2020, Direct became accessible from the Instagram website, allowing users to send direct messages from a web version using WebSocket technology. In August 2020, Facebook started merging Instagram Direct into Facebook Messenger. After the update (which is rolled out to a segment of the user base) the Instagram Direct icon transforms into Facebook Messenger icon.

In March 2021, a feature was added that prevents adults from messaging users under 18 who do not follow them as part of a series of new child safety policies. In August 2023, Instagram introduced new adjustments to protect user privacy and prevent harassment and spam. Users can now only receive one direct message from accounts that they do not follow, and must approve the message request before further messages can be sent. This setting can be changed to allow unlimited messages from other accounts that the user does not follow.

In September 2024, Instagram added a sticker editor which allows users to cut out elements of photos and send them privately. It also enabled sticker addition and writing on photos.

=== Instagram Stories ===
In August 2016, Instagram launched Instagram Stories, a feature that allows users to take photos, add effects and layers, and add them to their Instagram story. Images uploaded to a user's story expire after 24 hours. The media noted the feature's similarities to Snapchat. In response to criticism that it copied functionality from Snapchat, CEO Kevin Systrom told Recode that "Day One: Instagram was a combination of Hipstamatic, Twitter [and] some stuff from Facebook like the 'Like' button. You can trace the roots of every feature anyone has in their app, somewhere in the history of technology". Although Systrom acknowledged the criticism as "fair", Recode wrote that "he likened the two social apps' common features to the auto industry: Multiple car companies can coexist, with enough differences among them that they serve different consumer audiences". Systrom further stated that "When we adopted [Stories], we decided that one of the really annoying things about the format is that it just kept going and you couldn't pause it to look at something, you couldn't rewind. We did all that, we implemented that." He also told the publication that Snapchat "didn't have filters, originally. They adopted filters because Instagram had filters and a lot of others were trying to adopt filters as well."

In November, Instagram added live video functionality to Instagram Stories, allowing users to broadcast themselves live, with the video disappearing immediately after ending. In January 2017, Instagram launched skippable ads, where five-second photo and 15-second video ads appear in-between different stories.

In April 2017, Instagram Stories incorporated augmented reality stickers, a "clone" of Snapchat's functionality.

In May 2017, Instagram expanded the augmented reality sticker feature to support face filters, letting users add specific visual features onto their faces. Later in May, TechCrunch reported about tests of a Location Stories feature in Instagram Stories, where public Stories content at a certain location are compiled and displayed on a business, landmark or place's Instagram page. A few days later, Instagram announced "Story Search", in which users can search for geographic locations or hashtags and the app displays relevant public Stories content featuring the search term.

In June 2017, Instagram revised its live-video functionality to allow users to add their live broadcast to their story for availability in the next 24 hours, or discard the broadcast immediately. In July, Instagram started allowing users to respond to Stories content by sending photos and videos, complete with Instagram effects such as filters, stickers, and hashtags. Stories were made available for viewing on Instagram's mobile and desktop websites in late August 2017.

On December 5, 2017, Instagram introduced "Story Highlights", also known as "Permanent Stories", which are similar to Instagram Stories, but don't expire. They appear as circles below the profile picture and biography and are accessible from the desktop website as well. In June 2018, the daily active story users of Instagram had reached 400 million users, and monthly active users had reached 1 billion active users.

In December 2024, Instagram announced that it was trialing a feature designed to help users reconnect with content they may have missed from their mutual followers. This new functionality showcases unseen Story Highlights at the end of the Stories tray, which is situated at the top of the feed. By doing so, users can easily access curated Stories from the past week that they might not have seen previously. Importantly, this feature will only display Story Highlights—curated collections of Stories saved by users—rather than standard Stories that disappear after 24 hours. Users will only be able to view these Highlights after they have gone through all current Stories in their tray, meaning that those who follow many accounts may find it challenging to see these updates.

=== Interface redesign tests (2025) ===
In September 2025, Instagram began testing a Reels-first user interface in India and South Korea. The redesign displays the Reels page as the default home tab, with Stories remaining at the top and the direct messages (DM) button moved to the center of the navigation bar. The Reels tab now occupies the second position in the navigation, while a new Following tab sits alongside it, offering three feed options: "All" (recommended posts and Reels from followed accounts), "Friends" (content from mutual connections), and "Latest" (the newest posts and Reels). Meta stated that the test would initially reach a limited number of users, with plans for a global rollout depending on feedback.

=== Verified badges on Instagram ===
Instagram introduced a verification feature, known as the blue verified badge, in December 2014. The feature allows users to verify their accounts to confirm their authenticity. Instagram began allowing users to request verification for their accounts in August 2018. This marked a significant shift from the previous system where verification was typically initiated by Instagram itself for accounts it deemed to be of public interest or high-profile. With the introduction of this feature, eligible users could apply for verification directly through the Instagram app. The Instagram blue verified badge is a symbol displayed next to an account's name to signify that the account is authentic, credible, and belongs to a public figure, celebrity, brand, or entity of significant public interest. It helps users easily identify legitimate accounts amidst the vast number of profiles on the platform. The badge appears as a blue checkmark located next to the account's username in search results, profile pages, and comments. Obtaining the blue verified badge typically requires meeting certain criteria set by Instagram, such as being notable, authentic, unique, complete, and adhering to the platform's terms of service and community guidelines. Instagram verifies accounts based on its own discretion, and not all accounts meeting the criteria may be verified. Users can apply for verification through Instagram's settings, but the decision to grant verification ultimately rests with Instagram's team. Meta (formerly Facebook) launched paid verification on Instagram in 2021. Paid verification allowed eligible Instagram users to request verification for their accounts via paying a fee, rather than relying solely on meeting the platform's traditional criteria for verification.

=== Advertising ===
Emily White joined Instagram as Director of Business Operations in April 2013. She said in an interview with The Wall Street Journal in September 2013 that the company should be ready to begin selling advertising by September 2014 as a way to generate business from a popular entity that had not yet created profit for its parent company. White left Instagram in December 2013 to join Snapchat. In August 2014, James Quarles became Instagram's Global Head of Business and Brand Development, tasked with overseeing advertisement, sales efforts, and developing new "monetization products", according to a spokesperson.

In October 2013, Instagram announced that video and image ads would soon appear in feeds for users in the United States, with the first image advertisements displaying on November 1, 2013. Video ads followed nearly a year later on October 30, 2014. In June 2014, Instagram announced the rollout of ads in the United Kingdom, Canada and Australia, with ads starting to roll out that autumn. In March 2015, Instagram announced it would implement "carousel ads", allowing advertisers to display multiple images with options for linking to additional content. The company launched carousel image ads in October 2015, and video carousel ads in March 2016.

In February 2016, Instagram announced that it had 200,000 advertisers on the platform. This number increased to 500,000 by September 2016, and 1 million in March 2017. In May 2016, Instagram launched new tools for business accounts, including business profiles, analytics and the ability to promote posts as ads. To access the tools, businesses had to link a corresponding Facebook page. The new analytics page, known as Instagram Insights, allowed business accounts to view top posts, reach, impressions, engagement and demographic data. Insights rolled out first in the United States, Australia, and New Zealand, and expanded to the rest of the world later in 2016.

In November 2018, Instagram added the ability for business accounts to add product links directing users to a purchase page or to save them to a "shopping list". In April 2019, Instagram added the option to "Checkout on Instagram", which allows merchants to sell products directly through the Instagram app. In March 2020, via a blog post, Instagram announced that they are making major moderation changes in order to decrease the flow of disinformation, hoaxes and fake news regarding COVID-19 on its platform, "We'll remove COVID-19 accounts from account recommendations, and we are working to remove some COVID-19 related content from Explore unless posted by a credible health organization. We will also start to downrank content in feed and Stories that has been rated false by third-party fact-checkers."

In June 2021, Instagram launched a native affiliate marketing tool creators can use to earn commissions based on sales. Commission-enabled posts are labeled "Eligible for Commission" on the user side to identify them as affiliate posts. Launch partners included Sephora, MAC, and Kopari.

=== Stand-alone apps ===
Instagram has developed and released three stand-alone apps with specialized functionality. In July 2014, it released Bolt, a messaging app where users click on a friend's profile photo to quickly send an image, with the content disappearing after being seen. It was followed by the release of Hyperlapse in August, an iOS-exclusive app that uses "clever algorithm processing" to create tracking shots and fast time-lapse videos. Microsoft launched a Hyperlapse app for Android and Windows in May 2015, but there has been no official Hyperlapse app from Instagram for either of these platforms to date. In October 2015, it released Boomerang, a video app that combines photos into short, one-second videos that play back-and-forth in a loop.

In April 2026, Instagram launched a stand-alone app called Instants in select European markets, enabling users to share disappearing photos and short videos with close contacts.

=== Third-party services ===
The popularity of Instagram has led to a variety of third-party services designed to integrate with it, including services for creating content to post on the service and generating content from Instagram photos (including physical print-outs), analytics, and alternative clients for platforms with insufficient or no official support from Instagram (such as in the past, iPads).

In November 2015, Instagram announced that effective June 1, 2016, it would end "feed" API access to its platform in order to "maintain control for the community and provide a clear roadmap for developers" and "set up a more sustainable environment built around authentic experiences on the platform", including those oriented towards content creation, publishers, and advertisers. Additionally, third-party clients have been prohibited from using the text strings "insta" or "gram" in their name. It was reported that these changes were primarily intended to discourage third-party clients replicating the entire Instagram experience (due to increasing monetization of the service), and security reasons (such as preventing abuse by automated click farms, and the hijacking of accounts). In the wake of the Cambridge Analytica scandal, Instagram began to impose further restrictions on its API in 2018.

Third-party services can be used for unlimited browsing of public Instagram profiles without having to create an account, as well as for anonymous browsing of someone else's Stories. Stories are more authentic than typical photos posted as posts because users know that in 24 hours their Stories will disappear if they don't add them as highlighted (however users can check who saw their Story for 48 hours after it was published). For this reason, they are very valuable for market research.

=== Fact-checking ===
On December 16, 2019, Facebook announced it would expand its fact-checking programs towards Instagram, by using third-party fact-checkers organizations false information is able to be identified, reviewed and labeled as false information. Content when rated as false or partly false is removed from the explore page and hashtag pages, additionally content rated as false or partly false are labeled as such. With the addition of Facebook fact-checking program came the use of image matching technology to find further instances of misinformation. If a piece of content is labeled false or partly false on Facebook or Instagram then duplicates of such content will also be labeled as false.

=== Algorithm and design changes ===
In April 2016, Instagram began rolling out a change to the order of photos visible in a user's timeline, shifting from a strictly chronological order to one determined by an algorithm. Instagram said the algorithm was designed so that users would see more of the photos by users that they liked, but there was significant negative feedback, with many users asking their followers to turn on post notifications in order to make sure they see updates. The company wrote a tweet to users upset at the prospect of the change, but did not back down, nor provide a way to change it back, which they reaffirmed in 2020. However, in December 2021, Adam Mosseri, in a Senate hearing on child safety issues, stated that the company is developing a version of the feed that would show user posts in chronological order. He later clarified the company would introduce two modes: a classic chronological feed and a version of it that would let users pick "favorite" users whose posts would be shown at the top in chronological order while other posts would be mixed in below.

Since 2017, Instagram has employed the ability to reduce the prominence of accounts ("shadowbanning") it believes may be generating non-genuine engagement and spam (including excessive use of unneeded hashtags), preventing posts from appearing in search results and in the app's Explore section. In a now-deleted Facebook post, Instagram wrote that "When developing content, we recommend focusing on your business objective or goal rather than hashtags". Instagram has since been accused of extending the practice to censor posts under vague and inconsistent circumstances, particularly with regard to sexually suggestive material.

Instagram caused the userbase to fall into outrage with the December 2018 update. They found an attempt to alter the flow of the feed from the traditional vertical scroll to emulate and piggy-back the popularity of their Instagram Stories with a horizontal scroll, by swiping left. Various backtracking statements were released explaining it as a bug, or as a test release that had been accidentally deployed to too large an audience.

In November 2020, Instagram replaced the activity feed tab with a new "Shop" tab, moving the activity feed to the top. The "new post" button was also relocated to the top and replaced with a Reels tab The company states that "the Shop tab gives you a better way to connect with brands and creators and discover products you love" and the Reels tab "makes it easier for you to discover short, fun videos from creators all over the world and people just like you." However, users have not responded well to the change, taking their complaints to Twitter and Reddit, and The New York Times has shunned Reels in particular, saying "Not only does Reels fail in every way as a TikTok clone, but it's confusing, frustrating and impossible to navigate".

Also in 2020, Instagram rolled out a feature titled "suggested posts", which adds posts from accounts Instagram thinks a user would like to such user's feed. The feature was met with controversy from The Verge, which reported that suggested posts would keep users glued to their feed, give Instagram more advertising space, and ultimately harm the mental health of users, while Instagram executive Julian Gutman rebutted, stating the feature was not intended to keep users glued to their screens. Suggested posts received more controversy after Fast Company stated that the feature would be impossible to turn off.

On June 23, 2021, Instagram announced a test change to the "suggested posts" feature. The company will put suggested posts ahead of posts from people who the user is following in the Instagram feed, citing positive reception as the reason for this change.

== Mental health ==
=== Internal data from Meta ===
In 2021, The Wall Street Journal (WSJ) obtained and published internal research Meta had conducted. The leak included presentations seen by company executives, and the findings mentioned CEO Mark Zuckerberg in 2020.

The slides presented findings from three qualitative studies. The first interviewed 15 monthly Californian Instagram users with low body image and self esteem, aged 13–21. The second recruited 10 monthly users for a 5-day diary study, where they recorded their online habits. The third selected 7 users from the diary study for a 30-minute interview. No study was designed to be a randomized controlled trial or case-control, meaning they were incapable of drawing causal inferences. The WSJ reported that Instagram can worsen poor body image of young people, with girls particularly vulnerable. Instagram has had negative effects on the body image of one in three teenagers. Instagram makes 20% of the teens feel worse about themselves and 40% better about themselves. 70% of teen girls and 40% of teen boys experience negative social comparison. According to the research, Instagram has a higher impact on appearance comparison than TikTok or Snapchat. 13% of British and 6% of American teenager users with suicidal thoughts could trace them to Instagram use.

Instagram responded to the story, saying it "focused on a limited set of findings and casts them in a negative light." Meta defended not publishing its research, saying it was "kept confidential to promote frank and open dialogue and brainstorming internally." In the wake of the backlash, Meta announced it had "paused" development of Instagram Kids. The company stated it was looking into concerns raised by the regulators and parents.

=== Depression, anxiety and stress ===
Khodarahimi & Fathi 2017 found evidence users displayed higher levels of depressive and anxious symptoms compared to non-users. However, Frison & Eggermont 2017 found that, among boys and girls, browsing could predict depressive symptoms; liking and posting seemed to have no effect. Their study showed presence of depressive symptoms in a user could positively predict they would post. The study showed viewing celebrity and peer pictures could make the moods of women negative. In a 2021 study, Mun & Kim pointed out users with a strong need for approval were more likely to falsely present themselves, which increased the likelihood of depression.

Lub & Trub 2015 showed that following more strangers increases social comparisons and depressive symptoms. Multiple studies have found that increasing time spent on Instagram increases anxiety.

=== Body image ===
Users report higher body surveillance (habitual monitoring of one's shape and size), appearance-related pressure, eating-disorder-related-pathology and lower body satisfaction than non-users. Studies have shown users who take more selfies before making a post, and those who strategically present themselves by editing selfies, report higher levels of body surveillance and body dissatisfaction, and lower esteem overall. Tiggermann et al. showed facial satisfaction can decrease when one spends greater time editing selfies. Comments related to appearance on Instagram can lead to higher dissatisfaction with one's body.

=== Loneliness and social exclusion ===
Mackson et al. 2019 found users were less lonely than non-users and Instagram membership predicts lower self-reported loneliness. A 2021 study by Büttner & Rudertb showed that not being tagged in an Instagram photo triggers the feeling of social exclusion and ostracism, especially for those with higher needs to belong. However, Brailovskaia & Margraf 2018 found a significant positive relationship between Instagram membership and extraversion, life satisfaction, and social support. Their study showed only a marginally significant negative association between Instagram membership and self-conscientiousness. Fioravanti et al. 2020 showed that women who had to take a break from Instagram for seven days reported higher life satisfaction compared to women who continued their habitual use. No significant differences were observed for men. The relationship between Instagram use and the fear of missing out, or FOMO, has been confirmed in multiple studies. Research shows Instagram browsing predicts social comparison, which generates FOMO, which can lead to depression.

=== Eating disorders ===
A comparison of users with non-users showed boys with an account differ from boys without in terms of over-evaluation of their shape and weight, skipping meals, and levels of reported disordered eating cognitions. Girls with an account only differed from girls without in skipping meals; they also had a stricter exercise schedule, a pattern not found in boys. This suggests a possible negative effect of usage on body satisfaction and disordered eating for boys and girls. Appel et al. 2016 and Feltman et al. 2017 found a positive link between the intensity of Instagram use, body surveillance and disordered eating.

=== Suicide and self-harm ===
Picardo et al. 2020 examined the relationship between self-harm posts and actual self-harm offline and found such content had negative emotional effects on some users. The study reported evidence of online posts affecting offline behavior, but stopped short of claiming causality. Some benefits for those who engage with self-harm content have been suggested. Instagram has published resources to help users in need of support.

=== Sharenting risks ===
Sharenting is when parents post content, including images, about their children. Instagram is one of the main sites for sharenting. The hashtag #letthembelittle contains over 10 million images related to children on Instagram. Bare 2020 analysed 300 randomly selected images under the hashtag and found they tended to contain children's personal information, including name, age and location.

=== Addiction ===
Sanz-Blas et al. 2019 showed that users who feel they spend too much time on Instagram report higher levels of "addiction" to Instagram, which was related to higher levels of stress induced by the app. Foroughi et al. 2021 found that the desire for recognition and entertainment were predictors of students' addiction to Instagram. The study proved addiction to Instagram negatively affected academic performance. Gezgin & Mihci 2020 found frequent Instagram usage correlated with smartphone addiction.

== User characteristics and behavior ==
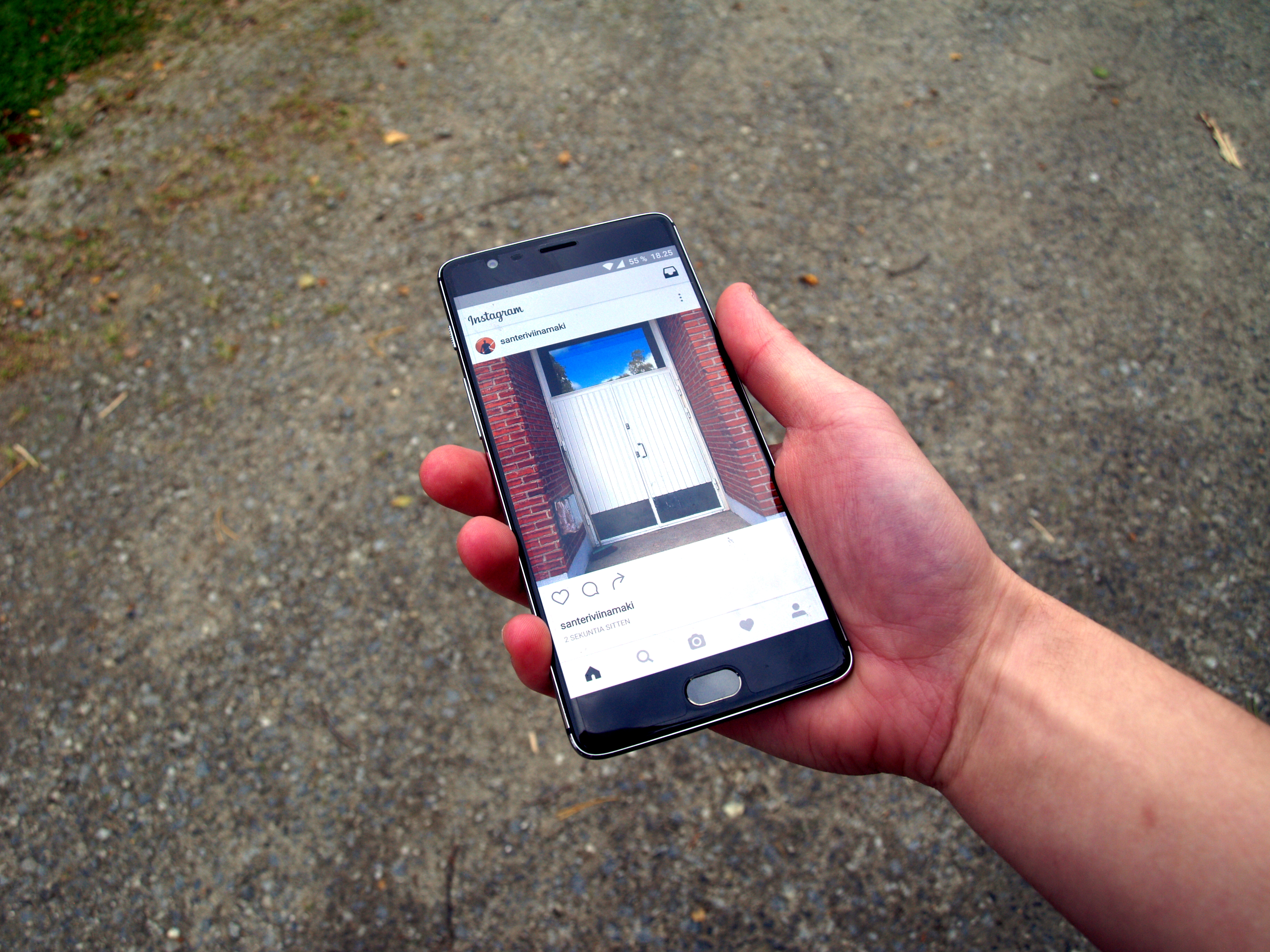
The Instagram app, running on the Android operating system, September 2016

=== Users ===
After being released in October 2010, Instagram had one million registered users in December 2010. In June 2011, it announced that it had 5 million users, which increased to 10 million in September. This growth continued to 30 million users in April 2012, 80 million in July 2012, 100 million in February 2013, 130 million in June 2013, 150 million in September 2013, 300 million in December 2014, 400 million in September 2015, 500 million in June 2016, 600 million in December 2016, 700 million in April 2017, and 800 million in September 2017.

In June 2011, Instagram passed 100 million photos uploaded to the service. This grew to 150 million in August 2011, and by June 2023, there were over 50 billion photos uploaded to the service. In October 2016, Instagram Stories reached 100 million active users, two months after launch. This increased to 150 million in January 2017, 200 million in April, surpassing Snapchat's user growth, and 250 million active users in June 2017.

In April 2017, Instagram Direct had 375 million monthly users.

Countries with most active users (January 2025)
Rank	Country	Users
1	India	414 million
2	United States	172 million
3	Brazil	141 million
4	Indonesia	103 million
5	Turkey	58.5 million
6	Japan	57.5 million
7	Mexico	48.8 million
8	United Kingdom	33.4 million
9	Germany	31.3 million
10	Argentina	28.9 million

==== Demographics ====
As of 2014, Instagram's users are divided equally, with 50% iPhone owners and 50% Android owners. While Instagram has a neutral gender-bias format, 68% of Instagram users are female and 32% are male. Instagram's geographical use is shown to favor urban areas, as 17% of U.S. adults who live in urban areas use Instagram, while only 11% of adults in suburban and rural areas do so. While Instagram may appear to be one of the most widely used sites for photo sharing, only 7% of daily photo uploads, among the top four photo-sharing platforms, come from Instagram. Instagram has been proven to attract the younger generation, with 90% of its 150 million users under the age of 35. From June 2012 to June 2013, Instagram approximately doubled their number of users. With regards to income, 15% of U.S. Internet users who make less than $30,000 per year use Instagram, while 14% of those making $30,000 to $50,000 and 12% of users who make more than $50,000 per year do so. With respect to the education demographic, respondents with some college education proved to be the most active on Instagram, with 23%. Following behind, college graduates consist of 18% and users with a high school diploma or less make up 15%. Among these Instagram users, 24% say they use the app several times a day.

=== User behavior ===
Ongoing research continues to explore how media content on the platform affects user engagement. Past research has found that media which show people's faces receive more 'likes' and comments and that using filters that increase warmth, exposure, and contrast also boosts engagement. Users are more likely to engage with images that depict fewer individuals compared to groups and they are also more likely to engage with content that has not been watermarked, as they view this content as less original and reliable compared to user-generated content. Recently Instagram has come up with an option for users to apply for a verified account badge; however, this does not guarantee every user who applies will get the verified blue tick.

The motives for using Instagram among young people are mainly to look at posts, particularly for the sake of social interactions and recreation. In contrast, the level of agreement expressed in creating Instagram posts was lower, which demonstrates that Instagram's emphasis on visual communication is widely accepted by young people in social communication.

=== Performative activism ===
In June 2020, because of the Black Lives Matter movement, Instagram became more widely used as a social justice platform. Instagram-based activism (as well as other social media) has been criticized and dismissed for being performative, reductionist, and overly focused on aesthetics.

== Censorship and restricted content ==
Like many social media sites, Instagram employs a combination of automated algorithms, user reports and human review to identify and remove illegal content such as child abuse and encouragement of terrorism. The system also aims to identify cyberbullying, hate speech and misinformation.

Although the U.S. government has little direct power to force social media sites to remove specific content, Instagram has on occasion done so voluntarily, especially to avoid being seen as aiding the spread of fake news. On October 30, 2020, Instagram temporarily removed the "recent" tab on hashtag pages to prevent the spread of misinformation regarding the 2020 United States presidential election. On January 7, 2021, following the attack on the U.S. Capitol by supporters of then-President Donald Trump, Trump was banned from Instagram "indefinitely". Zuckerberg stated "We believe the risks of allowing the President to continue to use our service during this period are simply too great."

Instagram has been criticized in India for not taking steps to counter homophobic and transphobic contents. According to the LGBT activist Indrajeet Ghorpade, "Hateful homophobic content in English is removed but the same in Indian languages is allowed to remain on the platform... despite flagging the hateful and homophobic content to Instagram, no action has been taken." In 2023, a 16-year-old queer artist allegedly died by suicide after receiving thousands of hate comments on Instagram.

=== Illicit drugs ===
Instagram has been the subject of criticism due to users publishing images of drugs they are selling on the platform. In 2013, the BBC discovered that users, mostly located in the United States, were posting images of drugs they were selling, attaching specific hashtags, and then completing transactions via instant messaging applications such as WhatsApp. Corresponding hashtags have been blocked as part of the company's response and a spokesperson engaged with the BBC explained:

Instagram has a clear set of rules about what is and isn't allowed on the site. We encourage people who come across illegal or inappropriate content to report it to us using the built-in reporting tools next to every photo, video or comment, so we can take action. People can't buy things on Instagram, we are simply a place where people share photos and videos.

However, new incidents of illegal drug trade have occurred in the aftermath of the 2013 revelation, with Facebook, Inc., Instagram's parent company, asking users who come across such content to report the material, at which time a "dedicated team" reviews the information. In 2019, Facebook announced that influencers are no longer able to post any vape, tobacco products, and weapons promotions on Facebook and Instagram.

=== Women's bodies ===
In October 2013, Instagram deleted the account of Canadian photographer Petra Collins after she posted a photo of herself in which a very small area of pubic hair was visible above the top of her bikini bottom. Collins claimed that the account deletion was unfounded because it broke none of Instagram's terms and conditions. Audra Schroeder of The Daily Dot further wrote that "Instagram's terms of use state users cannot post 'pornographic or sexually suggestive photos.'" You can indeed find more sexually suggestive photos on the site than Collins', where women show the side of "femininity" the world is "used to" seeing and accepting." Nick Drewe of The Daily Beast wrote a report the same month focusing on hashtags that users are unable to search for, including #sex, #bubblebutt, and #ballsack, despite allowing #faketits, #gunsforsale and #sexytimes, calling the discrepancy "nonsensical and inconsistent".

Similar incidents occurred in January 2015, when Instagram deleted Australian fashion agency Sticks and Stones Agency's account because of a photograph including pubic hair sticking out of bikini bottoms, and March 2015, when artist and poet Rupi Kaur's photos of menstrual blood on clothing were removed, prompting a rallying post on her Facebook and Tumblr accounts with the text "We will not be censored", gaining over 11,000 shares.

The incidents have led to a #FreetheNipple campaign, aimed at challenging Instagram's removal of photos displaying women's nipples. Although Instagram has not made many comments on the campaign, an October 2015 explanation from CEO Kevin Systrom highlighted Apple's content guidelines for apps published through its App Store, including Instagram, in which apps must designate the appropriate age ranking for users, with the app's current rating being 12+ years of age. However, this statement has also been called into question due to other apps with more explicit content allowed on the store, the lack of consequences for men exposing their bodies on Instagram, and for inconsistent treatment of what constitutes inappropriate exposure of the female body.

The Iranian government offered moderators bribes up to $9,000 to delete specific accounts, with Masih Alinejad being targeted in particular.

=== Criticisms and controversies ===
In January 2020, after the assassination of Qasem Soleimani by the United States, Instagram removed posts expressing support for General Soleimani. Instagram stated that this action complies with U.S. sanctions against Iran. Officials described the move as "undemocratic".

In May 2021, users including journalists and human rights activists reported that Instagram removed content, limited visibility (shadow banning), and restricted accounts referencing the potential eviction of Palestinians from East Jerusalem. This was in the context of The eviction of Palestinian families from Sheikh Jarrah, which became emblematic of the Israeli-Palestinian struggle over land rights, identity, and sovereignty in Jerusalem. Instagram denied intentional censorship and attributed the deletion of Palestinian posts to glitches. Digital rights groups such as 7amleh and Access Now argue that the removal of Palestinian content reflects broader issues of digital discrimination and have called for greater transparency from social media platforms.

In October 2023, Instagram labeled some users' profile bios as containing the term "terrorist" if they included the Palestinian flag emoji and the Arabic phrase "Alhamdulillah (Arabic: ٱلْحَمْدُ لِلَّٰهِ, al-Ḥamdu lillāh)," which means "Praise be to God." The platform's automated translation system incorrectly interpreted the phrase as "Palestinian terrorists are fighting for their freedom." Instagram attributed the error to a computerized translation system, apologized, and corrected the translation.

In February 2026, a court filing revealed that nearly 19% of users aged 13 to 15 told Meta that they saw unwanted "nudity or sexual images on Instagram."

=== Censorship by countries ===
Censorship has occurred in several countries.

==== China ====
Instagram has been blocked by China following the 2014 Hong Kong protests as many confrontations with police and incidents occurring during the protests were recorded and photographed. Hong Kong and Macau were not affected as they are part of special administrative regions of China. Sometimes the phrase "Chinese Instagram" is used to refer to Xiaohongshu, a competitor social media app.

==== Cuba ====
The Cuban government blocked access to several social media platforms, including Instagram, to curb the spread of information during the 2021 Cuban protests.

==== Iran ====
Instagram was one of the last freely available global social media sites in Iran. According to the IFJ, Instagram is popular among Iranians because it is seen as an outlet for freedom and a "window to the world". Still, Iran has sentenced citizens to prison for posts made on their Instagram accounts. The Iranian government blocked Instagram periodically during anti-government protests in 2019-20. In July 2021, Instagram temporarily censored videos with the phrase "death to Khamenei".

As of September 2022, it was blocked permanently, along with WhatsApp, with an exception made for tourists and corporations who request its use.

==== North Korea ====
A few days after a fire incident that happened in the Koryo Hotel in North Korea on June 11, 2015, authorities blocked Instagram to prevent photos of the incident from being spread.

==== Russia ====
On March 11, 2022, Russia announced it would ban Instagram due to alleged "calls for violence against Russian troops" on the platform during the ongoing 2022 Russian invasion of Ukraine. On March 14, the ban took effect, with almost 80 million users losing access to Instagram. Instagram along with Facebook are labelled as extremist by Russian government, making it illegal to use with VPN if the law was passed on July 17, 2025, to criminalise searching and accessing to extremist materials even with VPN, with a fines from 3000 to 5000 rubles (€30 to €50) by the September 1, 2025.

==== Turkey ====
On August 2, 2024, Instagram was banned by Information and Communication Technologies Authority (Turkey) after the Assassination of Ismail Haniyeh. The ban lasted for nine days and was lifted on August 10, 2024, with Instagram accepting the government's demands and agreeing to work with authorities.

==== United States ====
In the U.S., there is relatively little government regulation of social media content, with most content removal taking place on a voluntary basis by the companies. One exception was in January 2020, when Instagram and its parent company, Facebook, Inc., removed posts "that voice support for slain Iranian commander Qasem Soleimani to comply with US sanctions".

Following the election of Donald Trump in 2025, various sources noted possible censorship related to the Democratic Party on Instagram and other Meta platforms.

== Reception ==
=== Awards ===
Instagram was the runner-up for "Best Mobile App" at the 2010 TechCrunch Crunchies in January 2011. In May 2011, Fast Company listed CEO Kevin Systrom at number 66 in "The 100 Most Creative People in Business in 2011". In June 2011, Inc. included co-founders Systrom and Krieger in its 2011 "30 Under 30" list.

Instagram won "Best Locally Made App" in the SF Weekly Web Awards in September 2011. 7x7Magazine's September 2011 issue featured Systrom and Krieger on the cover of their "The Hot 20 2011" issue. In December 2011, Apple Inc. named Instagram the "App of the Year" for 2011. In 2015, Instagram was named No. 1 by Mashable on its list of "The 100 best iPhone apps of all time", noting Instagram as "one of the most influential social networks in the world." Instagram was listed among Time's "50 Best Android Applications for 2013" list.

=== Mental health ===
In May 2017, a survey conducted by the United Kingdom's Royal Society for Public Health, featuring 1,479 people aged 14–24 and asking them to rate social media platforms depending on anxiety, depression, loneliness, bullying and body image, concluded that Instagram was the "worst for young mental health". Some have suggested it may contribute to digital dependence, whilst this same survey noticed its positive effects, including self-expression, self-identity, and community building. In response to the survey, Instagram said that "Keeping Instagram a safe and supportive place for young people was a top priority". The company filters out the reviews and accounts. If some of the accounts violate Instagram's community guidelines, it will take action, which could include banning them.

In 2017, researchers from Harvard University and University of Vermont demonstrated a machine learning tool that successfully outperformed general practitioners' diagnostic success rate for depression. The tool used color analysis, metadata components, and face detection of users' feeds. In 2019, Instagram began to test the hiding of like counts for posts made by its users, with the feature later made available to everyone. In 2021, Instagram announced that like counts would return to be publicly viewable by default. Users can choose to switch them off for their whole feed or on a per-post basis.

Correlations have been made between Instagram content and dissatisfaction with one's body, as a result of people comparing themselves to other users. In a recent survey, half of the applicants admitted to photo editing behavior which has been linked with concerns over body image. In October 2021, CNN published an article and interviews on two young women, Ashlee Thomas and Anastasia Vlasova, saying Instagram endangered their lives due to it having toxic effects on their diets.

In October 2023, 42 U.S. states filed a lawsuit against Instagram and parent company Meta, accusing them of contributing to a youth mental health crisis due to the addictive nature of the platforms. The lawsuit claimed that Meta and its Instagram unit repeatedly misled the public about the dangers of its platforms and knowingly induced young children and teenagers into addictive and compulsive social media use. Meta representatives replied that they were disappointed with the lawsuit and were hoping instead to continue working with other companies from the industry to create new and better standards for applications teens use.

==== Negative comments ====
In response to abusive and negative comments on users' photos, Instagram has made efforts to give users more control over their posts and accompanying comments field. In July 2016, it announced that users would be able to turn off comments for their posts, as well as control the language used in comments by inputting words they consider offensive, which will ban applicable comments from showing up. After the July 2016 announcement, the ability to ban specific words began rolling out early August to celebrities, followed by regular users in September. In December, the company began rolling out the abilities for users to turn off the comments and, for private accounts, remove followers. In June 2017, Instagram announced that it would automatically attempt to filter offensive, harassing, and "spammy" comments by default. The system is built using a Facebook-developed deep learning algorithm known as DeepText (first implemented on the social network to detect spam comments), which utilizes natural-language processing techniques, and can also filter by user-specified keywords.

In September 2017, the company announced that public users would be able to limit who can comment on their content, such as only their followers or people they follow. At the same time, it updated its automated comment filter to support additional languages. In July 2019, the service announced that it would introduce a system to proactively detect problematic comments and encourage the user to reconsider their comment, as well as allowing users the ability to "restrict" others' abilities to communicate with them, citing that younger users felt the existing block system was too much of an escalation.

An April 2022 study by the Center for Countering Digital Hate found that Instagram failed to act on 90% of abusive direct messages (DMs) sent to five high-profile women, despite the DMs being reported to moderators. The participants of the study included actress Amber Heard, journalist Bryony Gordon, television presenter Rachel Riley, activist Jamie Klingler and magazine founder Sharan Dhaliwal. Instagram disputed many of the study's conclusions.

=== Culture ===
On August 9, 2012, English musician Ellie Goulding released a new music video for her song "Anything Could Happen". The video only contained fan-submitted Instagram photographs that used various filters to represent words or lyrics from the song, and over 1,200 different photographs were submitted.

=== Security ===
In August 2017, reports surfaced that a bug in Instagram's developer tools had allowed "one or more individuals" to gain access to the contact information, specifically email addresses and phone numbers, of several high-profile verified accounts, including its most followed user, Selena Gomez. The company said in a statement that it had "fixed the bug swiftly" and was running an investigation. However, the following month, more details emerged, with a group of hackers selling contact information online, with the affected number of accounts in the "millions" rather than the previously assumed limitation on verified accounts. Hours after the hack, a searchable database was posted online, charging $10 per search. The Daily Beast was provided with a sample of the affected accounts and could confirm that, while many of the email addresses could be found with a Google search in public sources, some did not return relevant Google search results and thus were from private sources. The Verge wrote that cybersecurity firm RepKnight had found contact information for multiple actors, musicians, and athletes, and singer Selena Gomez's account was used by the hackers to post naked photos of her ex-boyfriend Justin Bieber. The company admitted that "we cannot determine which specific accounts may have been impacted", but believed that "it was a low percentage of Instagram accounts", though TechCrunch stated in its report that six million accounts were affected by the hack, and that "Instagram services more than 700 million accounts; six million is not a small number".

In 2019, Apple pulled an app which let users stalk people on Instagram by scraping accounts and collecting data. Iran has DPI blocking for Instagram.

In September 2024, Meta paid out a $101 million fine for storing up to 600 million passwords of Instagram and Facebook users in plain text. The practice was initially discovered in 2019, though reports indicate passwords were stored in plain text since 2012.

=== Content ownership ===
On December 17, 2012, Instagram announced a change to its Terms of Service policy, adding the following sentence:

To help us deliver interesting paid or sponsored content or promotions, you agree that a business or other entity may pay us to display your username, likeness, photos (along with any associated metadata), and/or actions you take, in connection with paid or sponsored content or promotions, without any compensation to you.

There was no option for users to opt out of the changed Terms of Service without deleting their accounts before the new policy went into effect on January 16, 2013. The move garnered severe criticism from users, prompting Instagram CEO Kevin Systrom to write a blog post one day later, announcing that they would "remove" the offending language from the policy. Citing misinterpretations about its intention to "communicate that we'd like to experiment with innovative advertising that feels appropriate on Instagram", Systrom also stated that it was "our mistake that this language is confusing" and that "it is not our intention to sell your photos". Furthermore, he wrote that they would work on "updated language in the terms to make sure this is clear".

The policy change and its backlash caused competing photo services to use the opportunity to "try to lure users away" by promoting their privacy-friendly services, and some services experienced substantial gains in momentum and user growth following the news. On December 20, Instagram announced that the advertising section of the policy would be reverted to its original October 2010 version. The Verge wrote about that policy as well, however, noting that the original policy gives the company right to "place such advertising and promotions on the Instagram Services or on, about, or in conjunction with your Content", meaning that "Instagram has always had the right to use your photos in ads, almost any way it wants. We could have had the exact same freakout last week, or a year ago, or the day Instagram launched".

The policy update also introduced an arbitration clause, which remained even after the language pertaining to advertising and user content had been modified.

=== Facebook acquisition as a violation of U.S. antitrust law ===
Columbia Law School professor Tim Wu has given public talks claiming that Facebook's 2012 purchase of Instagram was a felony. On February 26, 2019, the New York Post released an article stating that the FTC had discovered a memo authored by a senior Facebook official, revealing that the purpose behind the acquisition of Instagram was to remove a potential rival. Wu explains this is a violation of US antitrust law (see monopoly).

=== Algorithmic advertisement with a rape threat ===
In 2016, Olivia Solon, a reporter for The Guardian, posted a screenshot to her Instagram profile of an email she had received containing threats of rape and murder towards her. The photo post had received three likes and countless comments, and in September 2017, the company's algorithms turned the photo into an advertisement visible to Solon's sister. An Instagram spokesperson apologized and told The Guardian that "We are sorry this happened – it's not the experience we want someone to have. This notification post was surfaced as part of an effort to encourage engagement on Instagram. Posts are generally received by a small percentage of a person's Facebook friends." As noted by the technology media, the incident occurred at the same time parent company Facebook was under scrutiny for its algorithms and advertising campaigns being used for offensive and negative purposes.

=== Human exploitation ===
In May 2021, The Washington Post published a report detailing a "black market" of unlicensed employment agents luring migrant workers from Africa and Asia into indentured servitude as maids in Persian Gulf countries and using Instagram posts containing their personal information (including in some cases, passport numbers) to market them. Instagram deleted 200 accounts that had been reported by the Post, and a spokesperson stated that Instagram took this activity "extremely seriously", disabled 200 accounts found by the Post to be engaging in these activities, and was continuing to work on systems to automatically detect and disable accounts engaging in human exploitation.

=== July 2022 updates ===
In July 2022, Instagram announced a set of updates which immediately received widespread backlash from its userbase. The changes included a feed more focused on Instagram's content algorithms, full-screen photo and video posts, and changing the format of all of its videos to Reels. The primary criticisms for these updates was that Instagram was more like TikTok than photo sharing. The backlash originated from an Instagram post and Change.org petition created by photographer Tati Bruening (under the username @illumitati) on July 23, 2022, featuring the statement "Make Instagram Instagram again. (stop trying to be TikTok; i just want to see cute photos of my friends.) Sincerely, everyone.". The post and petition gained mainstream attention after influencers Kylie Jenner and Kim Kardashian reposted the Instagram post; subsequently, the original post gained over 2 million likes on Instagram and over 275,000 signatures on Change.org. Instagram walked back the update on July 28, with Meta saying "We recognize that changes to the app can be an adjustment, and while we believe that Instagram needs to evolve as the world changes, we want to take the time to make sure we get this right." Despite repeated attempts by Meta to shape Instagram to appear and operate more like TikTok, user engagement continued to lag far behind its rival as of 2022.

=== Propaganda usage ===
Instagram has been used for propaganda purposes by a variety of different countries for different reasons. The reasons can be for domestic promotion of certain goals or foreign policy objectives. During the 2022 Russian invasion of Ukraine Instagram was used for propaganda purposes.

=== Wrongful account bans ===
Starting in 2025 and continuing into 2026, a large wave of users have been complaining of erroneous account bans, specifically for the reason of "child sexual abuse". This may be due to Meta's "AI-powered" moderation system, which lacks a proper human appeal process. Users have complained of "extreme stress" as a result of these bans, with some businesses losing income due to the lockout of their social media accounts. BBC News reached out to Meta, who declined to comment. Some users have tried to reach out to Meta through their Meta Verified program, which advertised customer support, but TechCrunch has reported that the customer service is "dismissive" and "unhelpful".

In South Korea, the National Assembly's Science, ICT, Broadcasting and Communications Committee organized a private meeting with Meta Korea due to continued erroneous bans, with an attorney noting that due to South Korea's Telecommunications Business act, Meta has to show cause for any service suspension for it to be justified.

== Statistics ==
Top ten most followed personal Instagram accounts
Name and username	Followers	Profession	Country
#1 Cristiano Ronaldo (@cristiano)	640 million	Footballer	Portugal
#2 Lionel Messi (@leomessi)	504 million	Footballer	Argentina
#3 Selena Gomez (@selenagomez)	424 million	Singer, Actress	United States
#4 Kylie Jenner (@kyliejenner)	396 million	Reality TV Star, Businesswoman	United States
#5 Dwayne "The Rock" Johnson (@therock)	395 million	Actor, Producer, Wrestler	United States
#6 Ariana Grande (@arianagrande)	376 million	Singer, Actress	United States
#7 Kim Kardashian (@kimkardashian)	360 million	Reality TV Star, Businesswoman	United States
#8 Beyoncé (@beyonce)	316 million	Singer, Actress, Businesswoman	United States
#9 Khloé Kardashian (@khloekardashian)	306 million	Reality TV Star, Businesswoman	United States
#10 Justin Bieber (@justinbieber)	294 million	Singer	Canada

The most-liked photo on Instagram is a carousel of photos from footballer Lionel Messi celebrating winning the 2022 FIFA World Cup, The post has over 76 million likes.

In 2022, Instagram was the second most downloaded mobile app of the year.

== In popular culture ==
- Social Animals (documentary film): A 2018 documentary film about three teenagers growing up on Instagram
- Instagram model: a term for models who gain their success as a result of the large number of followers they have on Instagram
- Instapoetry is a style of poetry which formed by sharing images of short poems by poets on Instagram.
- Instagram Pier: a cargo working area in Hong Kong that gained its nickname due to its popularity on Instagram

== System ==
Instagram is written in Python. Instagram artificial intelligence describes content for visually impaired people who use screen readers.

== See also ==
- Criticism of Facebook
- Dronestagram
- Instagram face – Beauty standard based on digitally altered photographs
- Instagram husband – Unacknowledged photographer behind another's social media posts
- Internet celebrity – Person who has become famous through their use of the Internet
- List of social networking services
- Pheed – Pay-per-view social media platform
- Pixnet – Taiwanese social media service
- Social media and suicide
- Timeline of social media
