= Western District Public Cargo Working Area =

Pier in Hong Kong

Instagram Pier
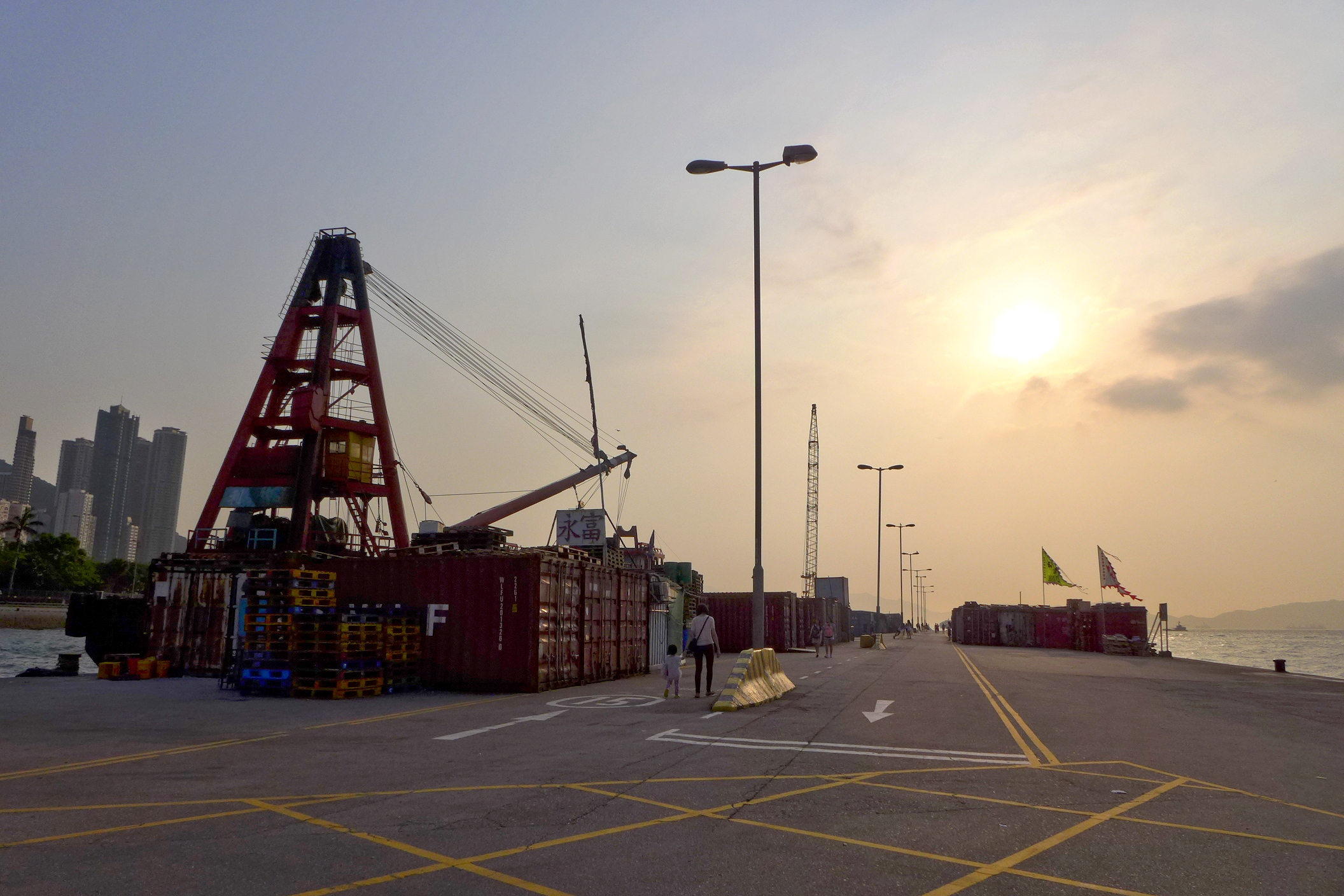
- Type: Container terminal
- Location: Junction of Hill Road at Connaught Road West; Sai Wan, Hong Kong
- Coordinates: 22.2891°N 114.1333°E
- Official name: Western District Public Cargo Working Area 西區公眾貨物裝卸區
- Owner: Hong Kong Marine Department

The Western District Public Cargo Working Area (Chinese: 西區公眾貨物裝卸區), commonly nicknamed the Instagram Pier, is a pier located on the waterfront of Sai Wan, Hong Kong. Originally a container terminal, the cargo dock has become a popular attraction and location for photographers. The Instagram Pier is well known by the public because of its clear view of Victoria Harbour, a major tourist attraction in Hong Kong. From the Instagram Pier, views like those of the Hong Kong skyline, sunsets, old lamp posts, caution barriers, cargo pallets, etc. can be captured.

The public cargo working area gained its nickname due to the huge amount of Instagram posts taken in this area, giving it its informal nickname of "Instagram Pier." It has subsequently gained a large amount of media coverage.

== History ==
The Instagram Pier was originally mainly for freighting and has been known as the Western District Public Cargo Working Area. It is one of the six public cargo working areas managed by Hong Kong's Marine Department. With the replacement of small and medium-sized freight companies by large transportation corporations, the usage of the Western District Public Cargo Working Area has become more infrequent. With the lack of amusement parks in the Western District, people began to occupy the area for walking dogs or even fishing. Since around 2010, it has been known for its scenery for watching the sunset, which makes it a good place for photos.

The area has become a popular place for witnessing sunsets and shooting photos. The picturesque surrounding area seen from the pier has taken on the nickname "Mirror of the Sky," since many photographs are taken of the reflective shoreline there. The name refers to the natural phenomenon of reflections seen on the unusually thick layer of water remaining on the ground after rainfall. The water clearly reflects the sky and the shadows of people and objects standing on the horizon. Sunsets often add a stunning effect to this phenomenon.

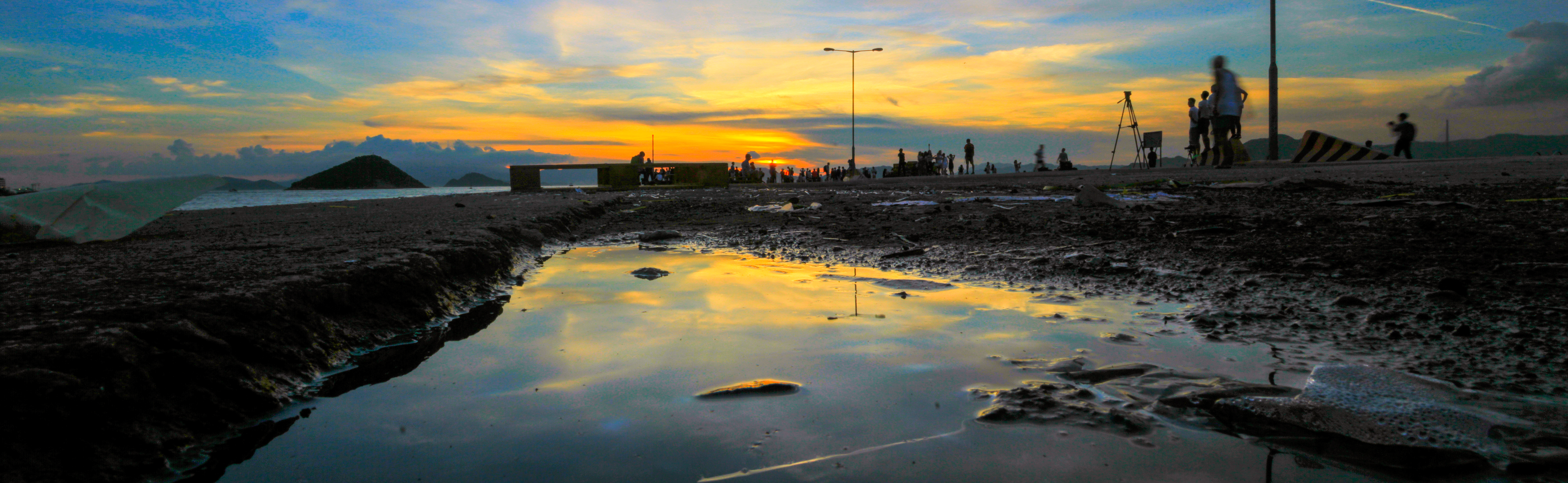
Sunset captured in the Instagram Pier

In 2013, the Instagram Pier won the "Outstanding Public Space Elections," jointly organized by Designing Hong Kong, the Hong Kong Public Space Initiative, and other groups. While the Instagram Pier received the highest number of votes in that election, it is technically not a public place. In fact, the Marine Department has posted warning notices at the pier entrance, citing public safety regulations. Only those engaged in loading and unloading operations are officially allowed at the pier.

After the introduction of the West Island line on the MTR in the first quarter of 2015, the pier has become more famous. In addition, the exposure on social media has attracted even more visitors, especially those from overseas. The end of the work day at the pier is the perfect timing for sunset. Photographers often line up with their tripods, waiting for the sun to fall on the horizon line.

On March 1, 2021, the Marine Department used the epidemic as a reason to prohibit the public from freely entering the Instagram Pier except staff.

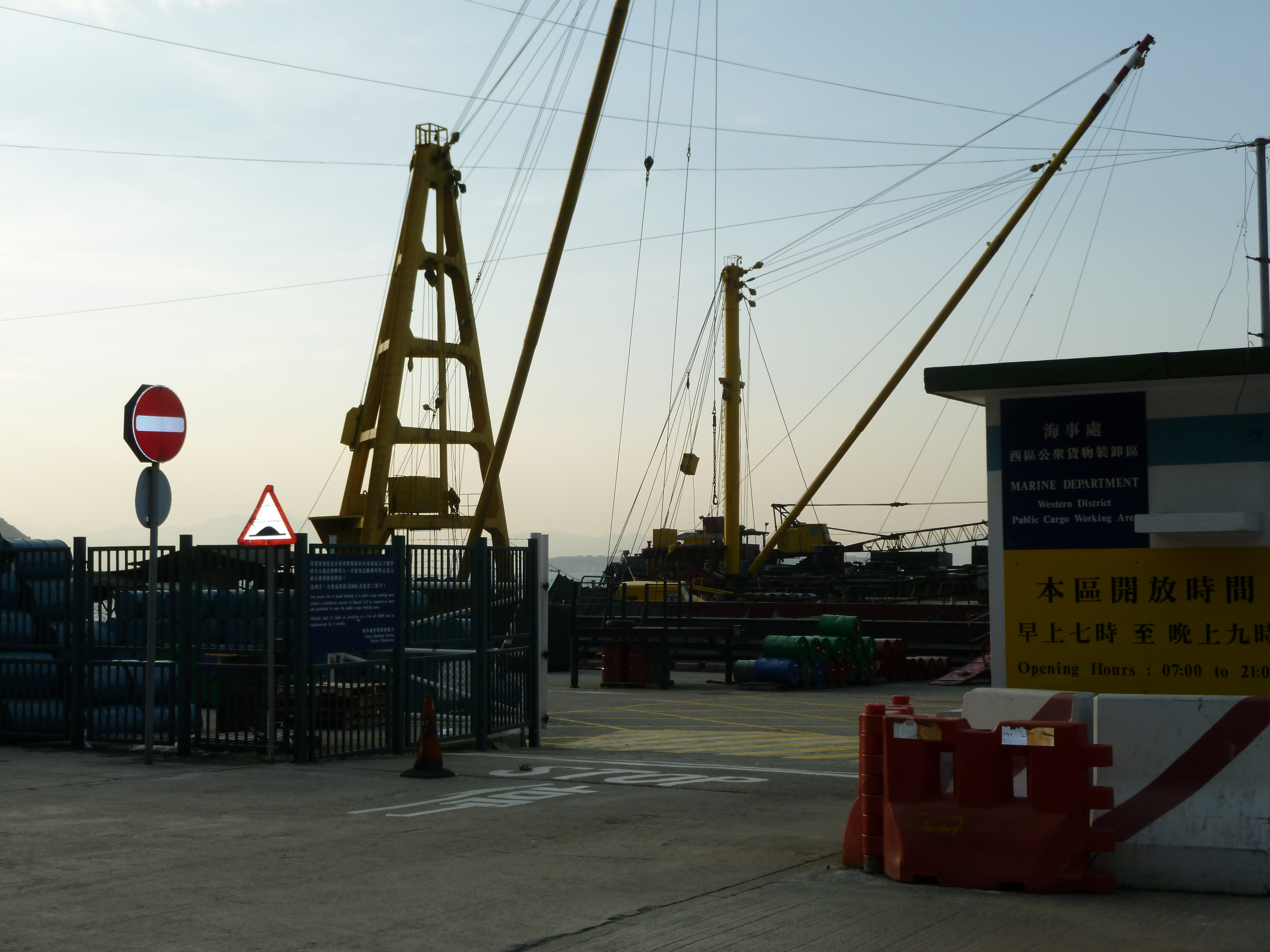
Entrance of the Instagram Pier

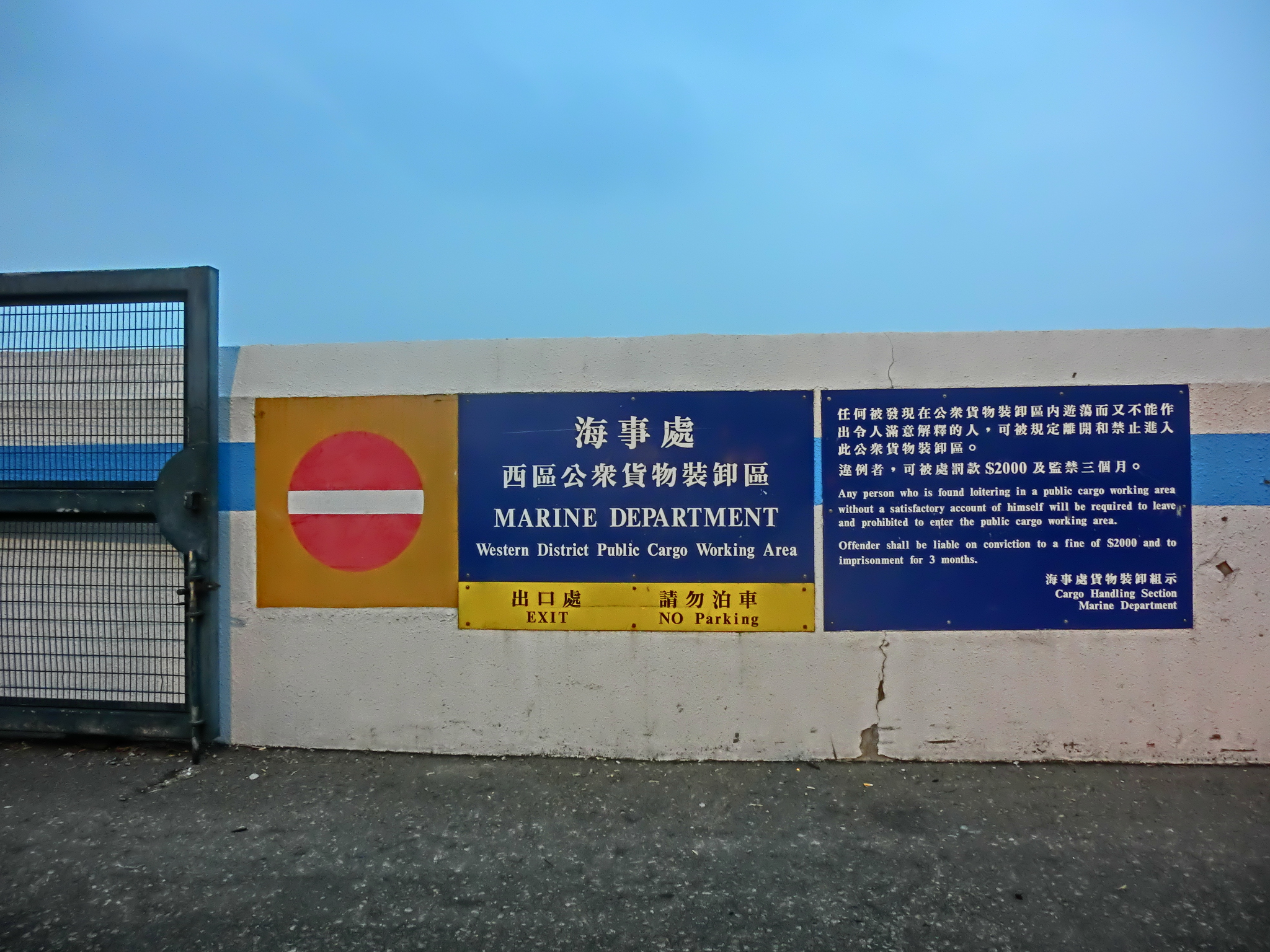
Notices at the extrance

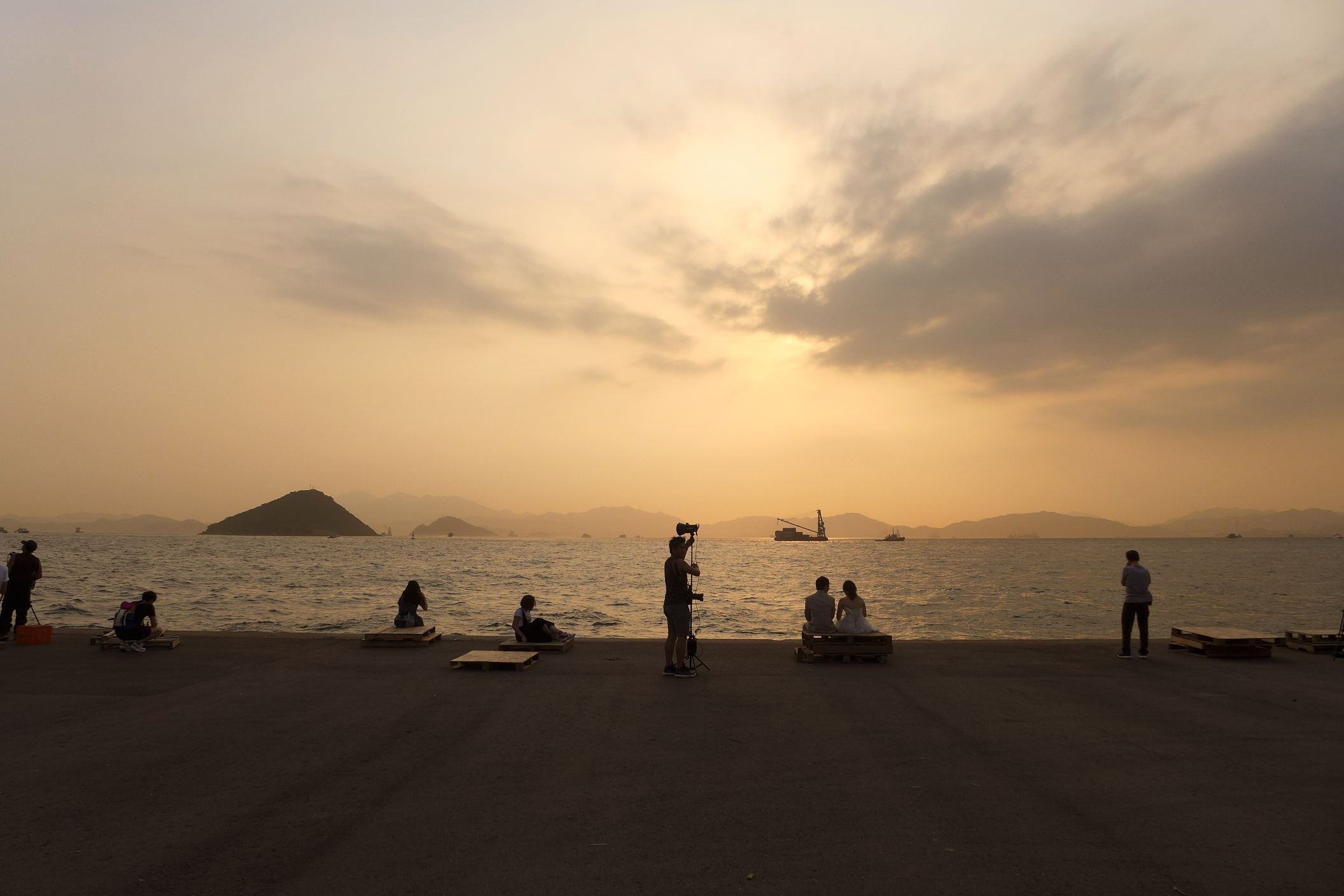
People enjoying the sunset

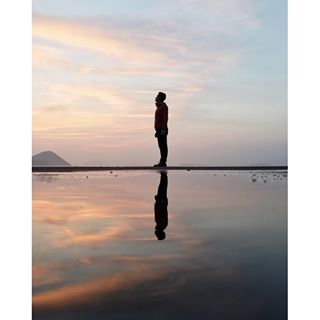
"Mirror of the Sky" snapped in the pier

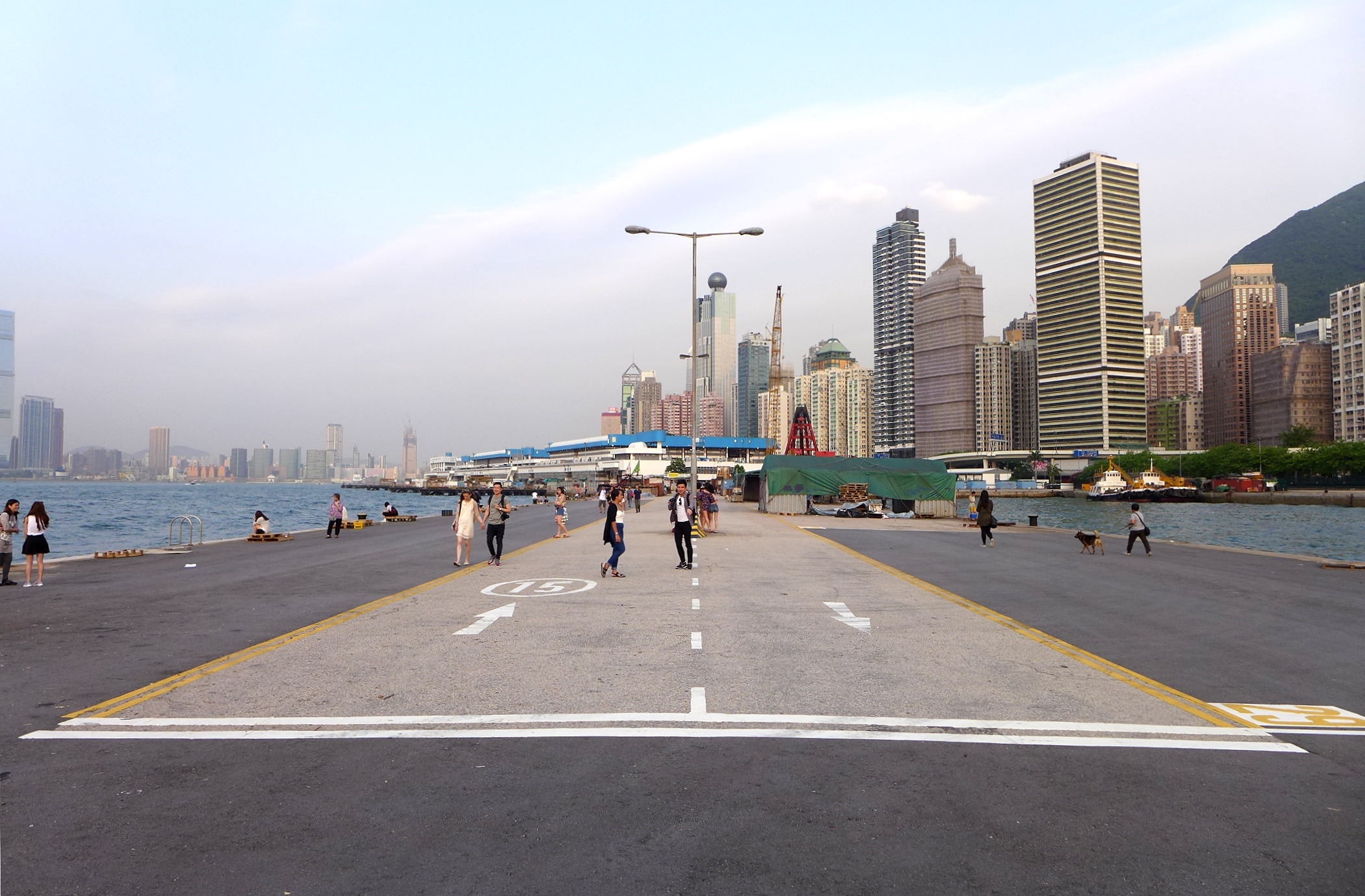
Crowds of people taking photos and resting

== Potential dismantling ==
Due to a lack of railings for protection, there is a potential danger of falling into the ocean. There have been accidents at the pier, making it possible that the site will have to be closed. The Hong Kong government suggested renovating the whole pier for town planning. It was planned to build extra railings and construct landmark buildings at the tip of the extended part. In addition, parts of the site might be re-established as a waterfront promenade. The planning generally included railings for the pier, and it would be transferred to the Leisure and Cultural Services Department for administration.

In the middle of 2015, a Hong Kong newspaper office exposed the news about this town planning, which received a large amount of negative feedback from residents. Afterward, the District Council denied the possibility of this project. However, the government has not forgotten the project. It has been persuading the operators to leave their berths in order to build the waterfront promenade. On the other hand, society has been considering other options for this project. It plans to rebuild the surfaces of Fung Mat Road, Shing Sai Road eastbound, and parts of the Western District Public Cargo Working Area as a waterfront promenade and cycle track; these works would be separated by railings or dividing lines.

In 2017, the Government of Hong Kong published their policy address in October, amending plans to portion off 7500 square meters (over 70%) of the "Instagram Pier" to be converted into a community garden. This sparked widespread criticism, and concerned groups protested against this decision. [1]

== See also ==
- Piers in Hong Kong
