= Dronestagram =

- Available in: English
- Owner: Eric Dupin
- Website: www.dronestagr.am
- Registration: July 2013; 13 years ago
- Users: >30,000
- Current status: Active

Dronestagram is a photo sharing community dedicated to drone photography. The site has been described as "Instagram for drones. The site launched in July 2013 by Eric Dupin and is owned by his company Dronescape. The project is based in Lyon, France. There is also a dronestagram iOS app.

== Contests ==
It also holds an annual International Drone Photography Contest. In 2016, the competition co-sponsored by National Geographic included 5,900 submissions from 28 countries which were broken down into the three categories: Nature-Wildlife, Sports-Adventure, and Travel.

To coincide with the 2015 UN climate summit in Paris, Dronestagram launched the 'Small drones, big changes' competition to find the best aerial photographs that illustrate "the effects of pollution on planet Earth and the solutions to tackle the problem".

Dronestagram is partner of the Professional Drone Film Festival Contest dedicated to drone cinematographic art in Nantes.

== Background ==
According to Eric Dupin drone photography quite literally offers a whole new perspective - he says "it depicts a new vision of the world, with stunning images taken from low altitude, near field" and distinguishes these from "images taken by satellite or plane or helicopter, or, on the other end, street view images" and notes that "it represents an 'intermediary layer'". He calls it "a new photographic language" and asserts that "part of the appeal is that drones can capture images of places that are impossible to reach with another flying device" and that while "with satellite images, and apps like Google Earth, we are now used to seeing Earth from above", "drone photos bring a new way of seeing the world, at low altitude, near landscapes and buildings, like a bird would do".

== The website ==
The site also features a drone business directory, and a drone pictures world map. As of 2015 the site has over 30,000 users. A study showed that new pictures are continuously uploaded and that the user community is steadily growing. Contribution analysis revealed participation inequality among data contributors: it was found that 55% of participating users contribute only one or two images, and that only 11% of users contribute 10 or more pictures. Analysis showed also that 92% of users contributed pictures in only one country. It also revealed a clear relationship between the income category of a country and the number of uploaded drone images among other factors. Furthermore, it identified the largest cluster of images around the project's home country France and the US' largest cluster in the southwest, which is known to be one of the thriving regions with in respect to IT development.

The website is not to be confused with @Dronestagram on Instagram launched in 2012 by British artist James Bridle that shows Google Earth images of the locations of drone strikes.
