= Instagram husband =

Unacknowledged photographer behind another's social media posts

An Instagram husband is an unacknowledged photographer who composes social media posts for someone else, usually a romantic partner. On Instagram, a photo-sharing social networking service known for carefully curated posts and elaborately staged amateur photo shoots, an Instagram husband is the individual who operates the camera at the direction of the photo's subject. With the rise of social media influencer culture, the quotidian task of taking photos for a partner or friend, for some, escalates into an obligation similar to a job. The term "husband" is used without regard to gender or sexual orientation.

The concept was introduced by a 2015 viral video that joked at the misery of men reluctantly assisting their partners in unending, impromptu photo shoots to share on social media. Since then, some of those types of social media creators have professionalized as influencers, earning an income from their social media followings. Accordingly, some professionalized Instagram husbands have adopted the moniker while joining in their partner's business.

== History ==
In 2015, a viral video by comedian Jeff Houghton coined the term, receiving over 7 million views as of 2019. The video satirically blames the rise of "Instagram and influencer culture" for turning taking photos of their partners into a "full-time job". Houghton theorized that the video was popular due to identifying something that had become common in relationships but had not been given a word yet.

In 2016, a gig economy marketplace made a limited offer allowing people to hire Instagram husbands for New York Fashion Week. A writer for Harper's Bazaar who hired one found the experience awkward at first, as the photographer didn't know her, and she found it hard to explain what she wanted.

== Analysis ==
The Atlantic characterized the role of an Instagram husband as shifting from a negative one to a positive one. At first, it was considered trivial or pointless to take photos of one's spouse. But as the monetary value of having a large social media following has grown, photography for social media posts can be an integral part of an online business. For serious influencers, their romantic partner can be responsible for photo editing, captions, planning photo shoots, and even the business side of things such as reviewing contracts, talking to brands and other business partners, and attending events. The services of a romantic partner are typically almost free, compared to expensive rates for things like professional photographers or an administrative assistant.

An editor for Racked hired a professional Instagram husband to take photos of her at an event. Despite planning to hire a 'husband', she noted that the person that showed up to work for her was a woman.

Jeff Houghton, the creator of the original viral video, connected the use of the photo shoot for average people to the rise of social media. He claimed that social media platforms allow anyone to play the role of a model or influencer if they want, regardless of their success, and taking lots of photos can be one way to indulge that urge.

== See also ==
- Invisible labor
