= Sharan Dhaliwal =

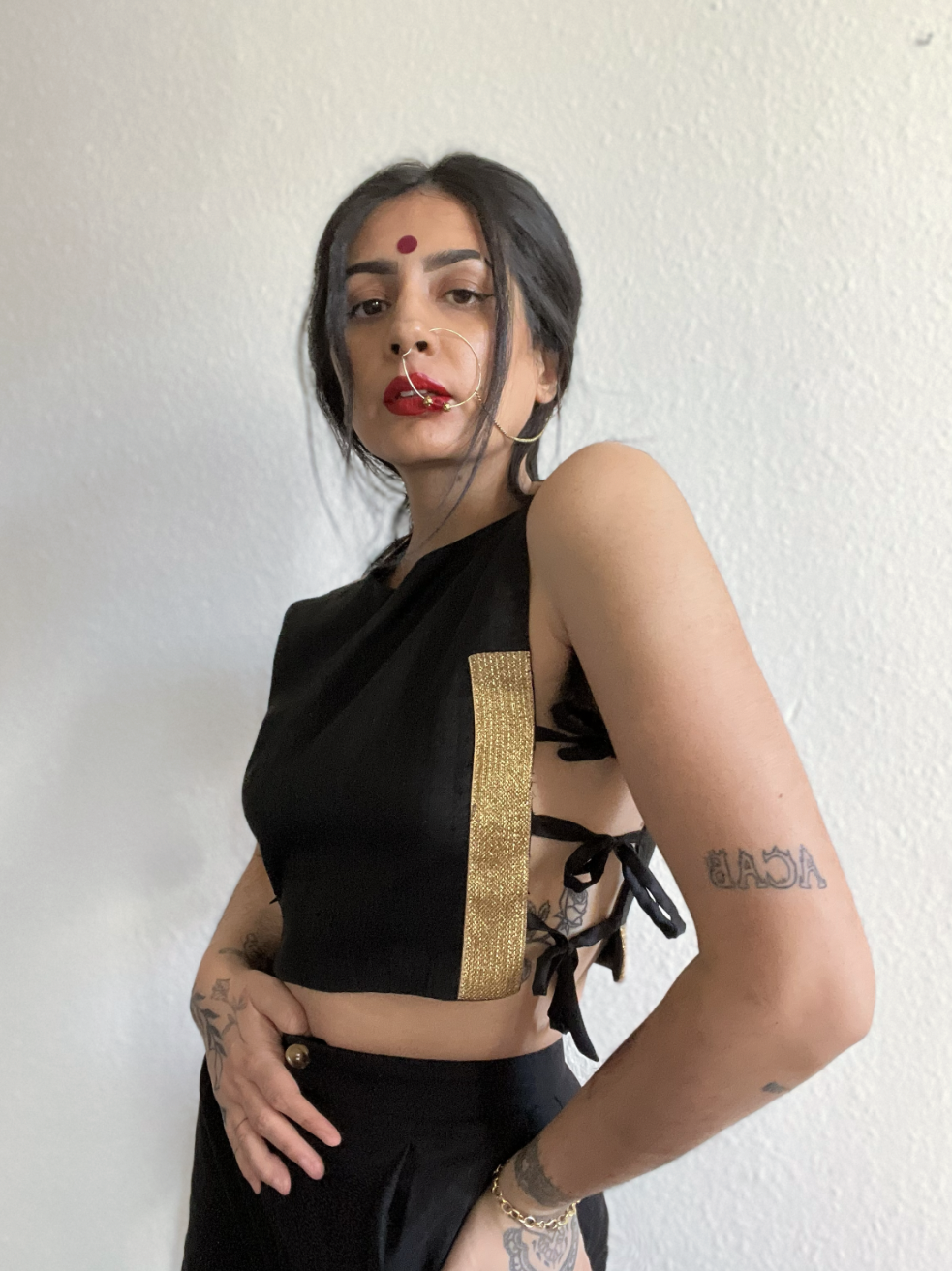
- Born: 19 May 1984 (age 42)
- Known for: Burnt Roti, Middlesex Pride
- Website: https://www.sharandhaliwal.com/

Sharan Dhaliwal (born 19 May 1984) is an English writer and editor. She (Note: Dhaliwal uses she/her and they/them pronouns.) founded the British South Asian cultural magazine Burnt Roti, Middlesex Pride, and Oh Queer Cupid. She authored the memoir Burning My Roti (2022).

== Life ==
Dhaliwal was born to Indian Punjabi parents and raised in Southall and Hounslow, West London.

Dhaliwal founded Burnt Roti in March 2016, followed by an online presence a month later. It aims to champion South Asian creatives, and provide a supportive space to start conversations about issues affecting them.

In 2018 Dhaliwal came out as bisexual, and has returned in her writing to reflect on her experience in handling other people's perceptions of her sexuality.

Dhaliwal has written for publications including i-D, HuffPost, Metro and The Guardian. She was the judge for PRISM International's Creative Non-fiction Contest in 2019.

Sharan Dhaliwal founded Middlesex Pride, initially as an online resource in 2021. The first ever in-person Middlesex Pride was held in Osterley Park in August 2023.

== Selected publications ==
- 'Coming Out in My Thirties', in Nickodemus, Lauren; Desmond, Ellen, eds. (2019). The Bi-ble: New Testimonials: Further Original Essays and Narratives about Bisexuality. Monstrous Regiment. ISBN 978-1916117914.
- 'Did you know Gandhi was racist?', in Bourne, Shakirah; Levy, Dana Alison, eds. (2021). Allies: Real Talk About Showing Up, Screwing Up, And Trying Again. DK Children. ISBN 978-0241505953.
- Burning My Roti: Breaking Barriers as a Queer Indian Woman. Hardie Grant Books. 2022. ISBN 978-1784884390.
- 'The Nature of White Sustainability', in Shahwar, Durre; Sarwar-Skuse, Nasia, eds. (2024). Gathering: Women of Colour on Nature. 404 Ink.

== Awards ==
- BBC's' 100 Women list, 2019.
- DIVA Power List, 2022.
- DIVA Power List, 2023.
- Attitude magazine 101, 2023.
- British LGBT Awards, Metro Top 10 Broadcasters, Journalists or Hosts, 2023.
