= Social Animals (2018 documentary film) =

2018 American documentary

- Theatrical release poster
- Directed by: Jonathan Ignatius Green
- Written by: Jonathan Ignatius Green; Carol Mortori; Peter Garriott
- Produced by: Blake Heal; Mark Lipson; Cameron DeArmond; Chase Jensen; Amanda Jensen; Peter Garriott; Jeff Keith; Courtney Stephens
- Starring: Kaylyn Slevin; Humza Deas; Emma Crockett Robinson; Ravi Vora
- Cinematography: Julian King; Martim Vian; Josh Kraszewski; Jonathan Ignatius Green
- Edited by: Brady Hammes; Peter Garriott
- Music by: Matt Abeysekera
- Production company: Subconscious Films
- Distributed by: Gravitas Ventures
- Release dates: March 9, 2018 (2018 South By Southwest); December 11, 2018 (United States)
- Running time: 87 minutes
- Country: United States
- Language: English

Social Animals is a 2018 American documentary film directed by Jonathan Ignatius Green about three teenagers growing up on Instagram. The film premiered at the South by Southwest Film Festival and was released in the United States on December 11, 2018.

== Premise ==
A daredevil photographer, an aspiring swimsuit model, and a midwest girl next door are all looking for the same things from their Instagram accounts––a little love, acceptance and fame––and they’ll do just about anything to get it. Social Animals peeks into the digital and real worlds of today’s teenager, where followers, likes and comments mark success and self worth.

== Appearances ==
- Kaylyn Slevin
- Humza Deas
- Emma Crockett Robinson
- Ravi Vora

== Release ==
Social Animals was shown at many film festivals including South By Southwest on March 9, 2018.

- SF DocFest
- Newport Beach Film Festival
- KC Film Fest
- Tallinn Black Nights Film Festival
- Not Film Festival
- Beat Film Festival

== Reception ==
On Rotten Tomatoes, the film has an approval rating of 88% based on 17 reviews, with an average rating of 7.7/10.
