= History of Yahoo =

Yahoo! was founded in January 1994 by Jerry Yang and David Filo, who were graduate students at Stanford University when they created a website named "Jerry and David's Guide to the World Wide Web". The Guide was a directory of other websites, organized in a hierarchy, as opposed to a searchable index of pages. In April 1994, Jerry and David's Guide to the World Wide Web was renamed "Yahoo!". The word "YAHOO" is a backronym for "Yet Another Hierarchically Organized Oracle" or "Yet Another Hierarchical Officious Oracle." The “yahoo.com” domain was created on January 18, 1995.

Yahoo! grew rapidly through 1990–1999 and diversified into a web portal, followed by numerous high-profile acquisitions. The company's stock price rose rapidly during the dot-com bubble and closed at an all-time high of US$118.75 in 2000. However, after the dot-com bubble burst, it reached an all-time low of $8.11 in 2001. Yahoo! formally rejected an acquisition bid from the Microsoft Corporation in 2008. In early 2012, Yahoo laid off 2,000 employees (14 percent of the workforce). This was the largest layoff in Yahoo!'s history.

Carol Bartz replaced co-founder Yang as chief executive officer in January 2009, but was fired by the board of directors in September 2011. Tim Morse was appointed as interim CEO following Bartz's departure. Former PayPal president Scott Thompson became CEO in January 2012 and after he resigned was replaced by Ross Levinsohn as the company's interim CEO on May 13, 2012. On July 16, former Google executive Marissa Mayer became the CEO of the company.

Mayer resigned as CEO of Yahoo in 2017, when it sold to Verizon for $4.48 billion, following Yahoo's disclosure of security breaches. Guru Gowrappan was CEO of Yahoo from 2018 to 2021.

Jim Lanzone is the current CEO of Yahoo, appointed September 2021.

== Early history (1994–1996) ==
Jerry Yang and David Filo, who were electrical engineering graduates at Stanford University, founded "Jerry and David's Guide to the World Wide Web" in January 1994. When the site was renamed to "Yahoo!" in March 1994, Yang and Filo said that "Yet Another Hierarchical Officious Oracle" was a suitable backronym for this name, but they insisted they had selected the name because they liked the word's general definition, as in Gulliver's Travels by Jonathan Swift: "rude, unsophisticated, uncouth." Its URL was akebono.stanford.edu/~yahoo.

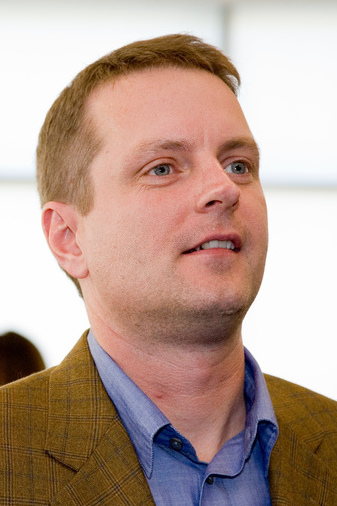
David Filo

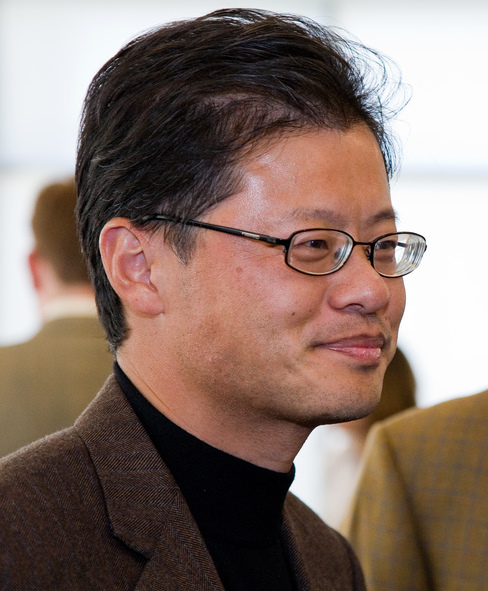
Jerry Yang

The “yahoo.com” domain was created in January 1995, although by the end of 1994, Yahoo! had already received one million hits. Yang and Filo realized their website had massive business potential, and on March 2, 1995, Yahoo! was incorporated. Yang and Filo sought the advice of entrepreneur Randy Adams for a recommendation of a venture capital firm, and Adams introduced them to Michael Moritz. On April 5, 1995, Michael Moritz of Sequoia Capital provided Yahoo! with two rounds of venture capital, raising approximately $3 million. In November 1995, Masayoshi Son initially investmented $2 million, but 4 months later this was expanded to $105 million for a 33% stake. The Yahoo! commercial website, including advertisements and news feeds from Reuters, launched in August 1995. That same month, Tim Koogle became the company's CEO.

On April 12, 1996, Yahoo! had its initial public offering, raising $33.8 million by selling 2.6 million shares at the opening bid of $13 each. It closed at US$33.00 – up 270 percent from the IPO price — after peaking at $43.00 for the day. The company's shares traded on Nasdaq under the ticker symbol YHOO. In September 1996, Yahoo! UK was launched.

The word "Yahoo" had previously been trademarked for barbecue sauce, knives (by EBSCO Industries) and human propelled watercraft (by Old Town Canoe Co.). Therefore, in order to get control of the trademark, Yang and Filo added the exclamation mark to the name. Srinija Srinivasan, an alumna of Stanford University, was hired as Yahoo!'s fifth employee as "Ontological Yahoo!" to assist Yang and Filo with organizing the content on the internet.

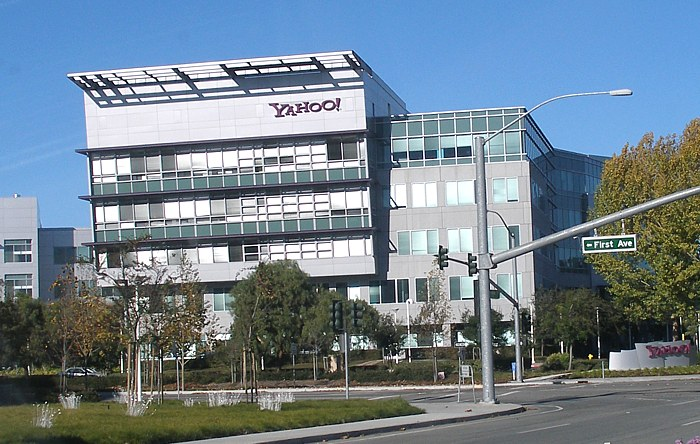
Yahoo! headquarters in Sunnyvale

== Growth (1997–1999) ==
In the late 1990s, Yahoo!, MSN, Lycos, Excite, and other web portals were growing rapidly. Web portal providers moved to acquire companies to expand their range of services, generally with the goal of increasing the time each user stays within the portal.

The company invested in Singapore in January 1997, for the creation of the Singapore ONE network. The goal was to create a version of its search engine for the Asian market. On October 8, 1997, Yahoo! acquired online communications company Four11 for about $94 million in stock. Together with the ymail.com domain name, Four11's Rocketmail is incorporated into Yahoo! Mail the following June. That same month, Yahoo! acquired Viaweb, co-founded by Paul Graham, for $49 million, turning it into Yahoo! Store. The company also acquired ClassicGames.com and re-branded it Yahoo! Games. Yahoo acquired direct marketing company Yoyodyne Entertainment, Inc. in October 1998. In January 1999, Yahoo! acquired web hosting provider GeoCities, followed by Broadcast.com in April 1999. It acquired Pager, an instant messaging service that was renamed Yahoo! Messenger a year later.

When acquiring companies, Yahoo! often changed the terms of service. For example, they claimed intellectual property rights for content on their servers, unlike the previous policies of the companies they acquired. As a result, many of the acquisitions were controversial and unpopular with users of the existing services.

== Dot-com bubble (2000–2001) ==
Yahoo! stock doubled in price in the last month of 1999. On January 3, 2000, at the height of the dot-com boom, Yahoo! stock closed at a high of $475.00 (pre-split price) a share. Sixteen days later, shares in Yahoo! Japan became the first stock in Japanese history to trade at over ¥100,000,000, reaching a price of 101.4 million yen ($962,140 at that time).

On February 7, 2000, yahoo.com was brought down for a few hours as the victim of a distributed denial of service attack (DDoS). On the next day, its shares rose about $16, or 4.5 percent as the failure was blamed on hackers rather than on an internal glitch, unlike a fault with eBay earlier that year.

During the dot-com boom, the cable news network CNBC reported that Yahoo! and eBay were discussing a 50/50 merger. Although the merger never materialized, the two companies decided to form a marketing/advertising alliance six years later in 2006.

In LICRA v. Yahoo! in May 2000, a French judge ordered Yahoo to ban Nazi-related sites from its search engine, and to stop acting as an intermediary on bids for objects with racist overtones. Yahoo denied the French court's jurisdiction over a United States-based company, and the tribunal's requests were finally abandoned in 2003. Yahoo eventually quit voluntarily trading on Nazi and Ku Klux Klan bibelots.

Yahoo! acquired eGroups, which became Yahoo! Groups, in June 2000. On June 26, 2000, Yahoo! and Google signed an agreement which would engage the Google engine to power searches made on yahoo.com.

In 2000, Yahoo became one of the first companies to implement a BizOps or business operations team. Terry Semel was announced as the company's next CEO in April 2001, with former CEO Koogle remaining on Yahoo's board.

On September 18, 2001, hacker Adrian Lamo satirically modified various older Yahoo! News stories and pointed out security flaws. No charges were filed. The following month, Yahoo! acquired Australian online auction site Sold.com.au from Fairfax Media. In December 2001, Yahoo bid $436 million for the job search engine HotJobs, defeating rival TMP Worldwide (Monster.com).

== Post dot-com bubble (2002–2005) ==
Yahoo! was one of the few surviving companies after the dot-com bubble burst. Nevertheless, on September 26, 2001, Yahoo! stock closed at an all-time low of $8.11.

Yahoo! formed partnerships with telecommunications and Internet providers to create content-rich broadband services to compete with AOL. On June 3, 2002, SBC and Yahoo! launched a national co-branded dialup service. In July 2003, BT Openworld announced an alliance with Yahoo! On August 23, 2005, Yahoo! and Verizon launched an integrated DSL service.

In late 2002, Yahoo! began to bolster its search services by acquiring other search engines. In December 2002, Yahoo! acquired Inktomi. In February 2005, Yahoo! acquired Konfabulator and rebranded it Yahoo! Widgets, a desktop application, and in July 2003, it acquired Overture Services, Inc. and its subsidiaries AltaVista and AlltheWeb. On February 18, 2004, Yahoo Search dropped Google-powered results and returned to using its own technology to provide search results. A beta version of a video search engine debuted in December 2004. In April 2005, Yahoo pledged support to the Wikimedia Foundation.

In March 2004, Yahoo! launched a paid inclusion program whereby commercial websites were guaranteed listings on Yahoo Search after payment. This scheme was lucrative, but proved unpopular both with website marketers (who were reluctant to pay), and the public (who were unhappy about the paid-for listings being indistinguishable from other search results). In October 2006, Paid Inclusion ceased to guarantee any commercial listing and only helped the paid inclusion customers by crawling their site more often, by providing some statistics on the searches that led to the page, and posting additional smart links (provided by customers as feeds) below the actual url.

In 2004, in response to Google's release of Gmail, Yahoo! upgraded the storage of all free Yahoo! Mail accounts from 4 MB to 1 GB, and all Yahoo! Mail Plus accounts to 2 GB. On July 9, 2004, Yahoo! acquired e-mail provider Oddpost, adding an Ajax interface to Yahoo! Mail Beta. Google released Google Talk, a voice over IP service, and Yahoo Messenger and Yahoo message boards service, on August 24, 2005. On October 13, 2005, Yahoo! and Microsoft announced that Yahoo! and MSN Messenger would become interoperable. In 2007, Yahoo! removed the storage meters on Yahoo Mail, allowing users unlimited storage.

Yahoo! continued the acquisition of companies to expand its range of services, particularly Web 2.0 services. In 2004, Yahoo! acquired European shopping search engine Kelkoo. Yahoo! Launch became Yahoo! Music in February 2005, with the service providing streaming audio, music videos, Internet radio, artist features and music news. On March 20, 2005, Yahoo! purchased photo sharing service Flickr and its creator Ludicorp. That same month, the company acquired game platform provider Stadeon and launched its blogging and social networking service Yahoo! 360°. In June 2005, Yahoo! acquired blo.gs, a service based on RSS feed aggregation, and DialPad Communications, a VoIP provider. Yahoo! purchased the online social event calendar Upcoming.org, in October 2005, as well as British location technology company Whereonearth Ltd. Yahoo! acquired social bookmark site del.icio.us in December 2005, and the playlist sharing community webjay in January 2006.

In February 2005, the company launched a developer network providing an API to most of its search verticals. Yahoo! Developer Network PHP Center follow . Yahoo!'s PhotoMail service launched in May 2005. New partnerships included Yahoo! Research Berkeley, announced in July 2005, and a collaboration with TiVo, announced December 2005, where several Yahoo! features could be viewed on television via the Series2 TiVo set top box.

The company's international presence also grew. Yahoo! established its European headquarters in Dublin, Ireland, in February 2005. Yahoo acquired 40 percent of Alibaba.com for $1 billion in August 2005, and Alibaba took over the operation of Yahoo China. In September 2005, information supplied by Yahoo! to the People's Republic of China leads to the imprisonment of reporter Shi Tao, aged 37 years, for ten years. Yahoo states that it was following Chinese law. In December 2005, Australia's Seven Network combined its online, mobile and internet TV business with the local arm of Yahoo! and the commencement of Yahoo!7 was scheduled for January 2006. Yahoo!7 covered both the Australian Open tennis tournament and the Winter Olympic Games in 2006.

== Yahoo! (2006–2008) ==
Yahoo! Next was an incubation ground for future Yahoo! technologies in their beta testing phase, similar to Google Labs. It contained forums for Yahoo! users to give feedback to assist in the development of these future Yahoo! technologies.

In early 2006, Yahoo! offered to users the opportunity to beta test a new version of the Yahoo! homepage. However, the test only had support for Internet Explorer and Mozilla Firefox browsers. Users of other browsers, such as Opera, have criticized Yahoo! for this move. Yahoo! said they intended to support additional browsers in the future.

Yahoo! launched Yahoo! Tech as a dedicated Yahoo News channel in May 2006. In December 2006 Yahoo! announced Yahoo!Xtra, a joint venture in New Zealand between its Australian joint venture Yahoo!7 and Telecom NZ. It debuted the following March. In February 2008, Yahoo! announced strategic partnerships with digital music service Rhapsody and T-Mobile.

Yahoo released a new search advertising system, Panama, in February 2007. On August 27, 2007, Yahoo! released a new version of Yahoo! Mail. It added Yahoo! Messenger integration (which included Windows Live Messenger due to the networks' federation) and free text messages (although not necessarily free to the receiver) to mobile phones in the U.S., Canada, India, and the Philippines.

In June 2007, Yahoo! officially retired the Yahoo! Auctions service, except in some parts of Asia. Yahoo! started shutting down Yahoo! Photos in August 2007 to transition users to Flickr; the shutdown completed on September 20, 2007. On January 29, 2008, Yahoo! announced that the company was laying off 1,000 employees, as the company had failed to effectively compete with industry search leader Google. The cuts represented 7% of the company's workforce of 14,300.

On June 18, 2007, Yahoo! co-founder Yang replaced Semel as CEO. Acquisitions in this period included online video editing site Jumpcut in September 2006 and MyBlogLog in January 2007. In March 2007, Yahoo! acquired Taiwan blogging site wretch.cc, followed by Right Media the following month. In June 2007, Yahoo! agreed to acquire Rivals.com and acquired a 35 percent stake in Indian online advertising company Tyroo Media Pvt Ltd. Yahoo! announced its acquisition of BlueLithium, a company founded by Gurbaksh Chahal, in September 2007. In February 2008, Yahoo! acquired FoxyTunes and Cambridge, Massachusetts-based Maven Networks, a supplier of internet video players and video advertising tools, for approximately $160 million.

Yahoo! announced on November 17, 2008, that Jerry Yang would be stepping down as CEO. On December 10, 2008, Yahoo! began layoffs of 1,520 employees world-wide due to the global economic downturn.

=== Acquisition attempt by Microsoft ===
Microsoft and Yahoo! were in merger discussions in 2005, 2006, and 2007, that were ultimately unsuccessful. At the time, analysts were skeptical about the wisdom of a business combination by these two firms.

On February 1, 2008, after its friendly takeover offer was rebuffed by Yahoo!, Microsoft made an unsolicited takeover bid to buy Yahoo! for $44.6 billion in cash and stock. Days later, Yahoo! considered alternatives to the merger with Microsoft, including a merger with Internet giant Google or a potential transaction with News Corp. On February 11, 2008, Yahoo! rejected Microsoft's offer as "substantially undervaluing" Yahoo!'s brand, audience, investments, and growth prospects.

On February 22, two Detroit-based pension companies sued Yahoo! and its board of directors for allegedly breaching their duty to shareholders by opposing Microsoft's takeover bid and pursuing "value destructive" third-party deals. In early March, Google CEO Eric Schmidt went on record saying that he was concerned that a potential Microsoft-Yahoo! merger might hurt the internet by compromising its openness. The value of Microsoft's cash and stock offer declined with Microsoft's stock price, falling to $42.2 billion by April 4. On April 5, Microsoft CEO Steve Ballmer sent a letter to Yahoo!'s board of directors stating that if within three weeks they had not accepted the deal, Microsoft would approach shareholders directly in hopes of electing a new board and moving forward with merger talks (a hostile takeover). In response, Yahoo! stated on April 7 that they were not opposed to a merger, but that they wanted a better offer. In addition, they stated that Microsoft's "aggressive" approach was worsening their relationship and the chances of a "friendly" merger. Later the same day, Yahoo! stated that the original $44.6 billion offer was not acceptable. Following this, there was considerable discussion of having Time Warner's AOL and Yahoo! merge, instead of the originally proposed Microsoft deal.

On May 3, 2008, Microsoft withdrew the offer. During a meeting between Ballmer and Yang, Microsoft had offered to raise its offer by $5 billion to $33 per share, while Yahoo! demanded $37 per share. One of Ballmer's representatives suggested that Yang would implement a poison pill to make the takeover as difficult as possible, saying "They are going to burn the furniture if we go hostile. They are going to destroy the place."

Analysts said that Yahoo!'s shares, which closed at $28.67 per share on May 2, were likely to drop below $25 per share and perhaps as low as $20 per share on May 5, which would put significant pressure on Yang to engineer a turnaround of the company. Some suggested that institutional investors would file lawsuits against Yahoo!'s board of directors for not acting in shareholder interest by refusing Microsoft's offer.

On May 5, 2008, following Microsoft's withdrawal, Yahoo!'s stock dropped 15% lower to $23.02 per share in Monday trading and trimmed about $6 billion off of its market capitalization.

On June 12, 2008, Yahoo! announced that it had ended all talks with Microsoft about purchasing either part of the business (the search advertising business) or the entire company. Talks had taken place the previous weekend (June 8), during which Microsoft allegedly told Yahoo! that it was no longer interested in a purchase of the company at the price offered earlier – $33 per share. Also, on June 12, Yahoo! announced a non-exclusive search advertising alliance with Google. Upon this announcement, many executives and senior employees announced their plans to leave the company as they appeared to have lost confidence in Yahoo!'s strategies. According to market analysts, those pending departures impacted Wall Street's perception of the company.

On July 7, 2008, Microsoft said it would consider offering another bid for Yahoo! if the company's nine directors would be ousted at the annual meeting scheduled to be held on August 1, 2008. Microsoft believed it would be able to better negotiate with a new board.

Billionaire investor Carl Icahn, calling the current board irrational in its approach to talks with Microsoft, launched a proxy fight to replace Yahoo!'s board. On July 21, 2008, Yahoo! settled with Carl Icahn, agreeing to appoint him and two of his allies to an expanded board.

On November 20, 2008, almost 10 months after Microsoft's initial offer of $33 per share, Yahoo!'s stock (YHOO) dropped to a 52-week low, trading at only $8.94 per share.

On November 30, 2008, Microsoft offered to buy Yahoo!'s search business for $20 billion.

== Carol Bartz era (2009–2011) ==
On January 13, 2009, Yahoo! appointed Carol Bartz, former executive chairman of Autodesk, as its new chief executive officer and a member of the board of directors. Yahoo! wished to change its direction after chief executive Carol Bartz replaced co-founder Jerry Yang.

In July 2009, Microsoft and Yahoo! agreed to a deal that would see Yahoo!'s websites use both Microsoft's search technology and search advertising. Yahoo! in turn became the sales team for banner advertising for both companies. While Microsoft would provide algorithmic search results, Yahoo! would control the presentation and personalization of results for searches on its pages. Organic results from Bing replaced Yahoo! organic search results in August 2010.

On July 21, 2009, Yahoo! launched a new version of its front page, called Metro. The new page allowed users to customize it through the prominent "My Favorites" panel on the left side and integrate third-party web services and launch them within one page.

On October 28, 2009, Bartz told PCWorld that she struggled with the question of what Yahoo! is when she took over as CEO in January 2009. After talking to many users in about 10 countries, she said, Yahoo! executives concluded that users consider it their "home on the Internet."

During this time, Yahoo acquired sports mobile and social gaming startup Citizen Sports in March 2010 and advertising start-up Dapper in October 2010. In November 2011, Yahoo! acquired Interclick, a developer of online user behavior identification and targeting technology.

Yahoo! announced integration with Facebook Connect in December 2009. In July 2010, the company introduced mail and messenger applications for Android.

In September 2011, Bartz sent an email to Yahoo! employees saying she was removed from her position at Yahoo! by the company's chairman Roy Bostock via a phone call. CFO Tim Morse was named as Interim CEO of the company.

== Scott Thompson period (2012) ==
On January 4, 2012, Scott Thompson, former President of PayPal, was named the new chief executive officer.

=== Employee layoffs ===
In early 2012, after the appointment of Scott Thompson as the new CEO, many rumors spread about large layoffs looming. Kara Swisher who covered Yahoo at All Things Digital reported that Yahoo's Chief Product Officer Blake Irving resigned, Andrei Broder, who was VP of computational advertising and chief scientist of the Advertising Product Group, as well as Jianchang (JC) Mao, who headed advertising sciences, left the company. This followed the departures of Yahoo! Labs head Prabhakar Raghavan who left for Google, and Raghu Ramakrishnan, who went to Microsoft.

On April 4, 2012, Yahoo announced a cut of 2,000 jobs or about 14 percent of 14,100 workers employed by Yahoo. Yahoo! said it would save around $375 million annually after the layoffs completed at end of 2012.

=== Facebook patent lawsuit ===
On March 14, Yahoo! filed a lawsuit against Facebook over the alleged infringement of 10 patents. Facebook responded by counter suing Yahoo!. The two companies settled the dispute in July 2012.

=== Reorganization ===
In an email memo sent to employees in April 2012, Scott Thompson re-iterated his view that customers should come first at Yahoo. He defined customers as both users and advertisers. He also re-organized the company. The reorganization took effect on May 1, 2012, and included operations in three major groups for Yahoo! – Consumer, Regions and Technology.

The consumer group had three groups: Media, Connections, and Commerce. The customers of this group are the users of Yahoo!.

The Regions group operated three regions: Americas, APAC, and EMEA. The customers of this group are the advertisers of Yahoo!.

The Technology group included Core Platforms, and Central Technology. It provides technology and support to the other two major groups.

The Corporate group (Finance, Legal, and HR) remained unchanged and continued to support the new groups.

=== Thompson's College degree controversy ===
On May 3, 2012, news reported that Scott Thompson's biography at Yahoo was incorrect. The CEO's biography stated that he held a dual accounting and computer science degree from Stonehill College, whereas investigation revealed that Thompson's degree was solely in accounting, and not in computer science. The information came from Dan Loeb, founder of Third Point LLC, which held 5.8% of Yahoo! stock, and who had been trying to gain seats on the board of directors of Yahoo!

In response to this, Yahoo!'s board of directors formed a three-member committee to review Thompson's academic credentials and the vetting process that preceded his selection as CEO. The review committee's chairman was Alfred Amoroso, who joined Yahoo!'s board in February 2012. The other directors on the panel were John Hayes and Thomas McInerney, who both joined in April 2012. The committee retained Terry Bird as independent counsel.

=== Thompson replaced by Ross Levinsohn (interim) ===
On May 13, 2012, Scott Thompson was replaced by Ross Levinsohn as the company's interim CEO. Chairman Roy Bostock also departed, and Amoroso became chairman of the board. On May 21, 2012, Yahoo! sold half of its stake in Alibaba Group for $7.1 billion in cash and stock. After his time as CEO, Levinsohn left the company in July 2012.

In June 2012, Yahoo! hired former Google director Michael Barrett as its chief revenue officer. Yahoo! Voices was hacked in July 2012, compromising approximately half a million email addresses and passwords associated with Yahoo! Contributor Network.

== Marissa Mayer era (2012–2017) ==
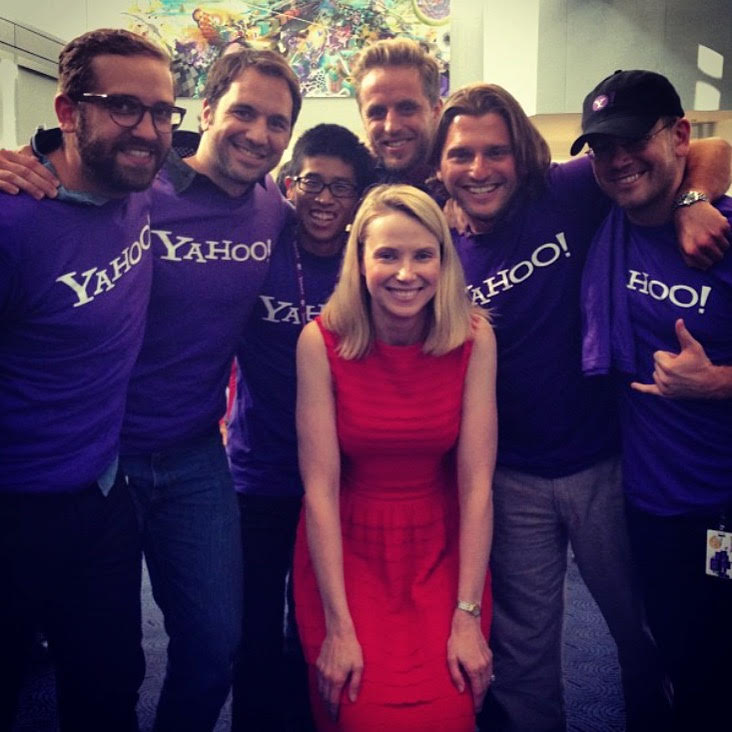
Doug Imbruce, co-founder and CEO, with the Qwiki team and Yahoo! CEO Marissa Mayer at the company's Sunnyvale HQ, July 2013

On July 16, 2012, former Google executive and Walmart corporate director Marissa Mayer was named as Yahoo! CEO and President, and youngest CEO of a Fortune 500 company. On September 18, 2012, Yahoo! announced the completion of the first stage of the Alibaba share repurchase. The deal was expected to net Yahoo! $4.3 billion, and Mayer stated that the board and management decided to return $3 billion to shareholders. Henrique De Castro joined the company as chief operating officer in October 2012; he then departed in January 2014. Ken Goldman replaced Tim Morse as CFO on October 22, 2012.

On March 1, 2013, Yahoo! announced that it was making some changes to the products it offers, including shutting down some while updating others. This included the Yahoo! Message Boards site, which shut down on April 1. The Yahoo! updates API was no longer supported after April 16. On April 26, 2013, Amoroso announced that he was stepping down as chairman immediately and would be leaving the board in June 2013. Yahoo announced in May 2013 that it would begin to include relevant tweets inside their homepage news feed in a partnership with Twitter. Yahoo! announced the scheduled closure of twelve services, including Yahoo! Axis, RSS Alerts, and Alta Vista, in June 2013. The following month, the company announced the scheduled closure of May 2013 acquisition Astrid, with the task management service to be discontinued on August 5.

The revamp of the Yahoo-owned photography service Flickr was launched in Times Square, New York, U.S. on May 20, 2013, in an event that was attended by the city's mayor and a large contingency of journalists. Eleven billboards in Times Square advertised the website's new tagline "biggr, spectaculr, wherevr" as part of the launch and Yahoo stated that it would provide Flickr users with a free terabyte of storage. The official announcement of the Tumblr acquisition was also included in the May 20 event.

After deactivating inactive accounts, Yahoo! announced in July 2013 it would redistribute their user names on a first-come, first-served basis. On August 7, 2013, at around midnight EDT, Yahoo! announced that it would be introducing the final version of the new logo on 5 September 2013 at 4:00 a.m. UTC. To mark the occasion, the company launched a "30 days of change" campaign that involved releasing a variation of the logo on each of the 30 days leading up to the revelation date.

Data collated by comScore during July 2013 revealed that more people in the U.S. visited Yahoo! websites during the month in comparison to Google websites. The occasion was the first time that Yahoo! outperformed Google since 2011. The data did not incorporate visit statistics for the Yahoo!-owned Tumblr website or mobile phone usage. That same month, Yahoo! corporate director Daniel Loeb sold his stock for double what he paid for it in an insider deal, depleting Yahoo!’s cash.

In January 2014, Fox IT detected a malicious exploit is detected in Yahoo!'s ad network. Targeted at Java, the malware's first infection was dated back to December 30, 2013, and especially affected users in Romania, France, and the UK. Fox IT stated on its blog that the malware was being delivered to 300,000 Yahoo! users per hour when they discovered it. The next month, Yahoo! denied any knowledge of the interception and collection of webcam images by GCHQ, Britain's surveillance agency, who with aid from the U.S. NSA, intercepted Yahoo webcam images of millions of individuals not suspected of wrongdoing.

On February 17, 2016, Yahoo! replaced Yahoo! Labs with Yahoo! Research.

On September 22, 2016, Yahoo disclosed a data breach in which hackers stole information associated with at least 500 million user accounts in late 2014. According to the BBC, this was the largest technical breach reported to date. Specific details of material taken include names, email addresses, telephone numbers, encrypted or unencrypted security questions and answers, dates of birth, and encrypted passwords. The breach used manufactured web cookies to falsify login credentials, allowing hackers to gain access to any account without needing a password. On December 14, 2016 a separate data breach, occurring earlier around August 2013, was reported. This breach affected over 1 billion user accounts and was considered the largest discovered in the history of the Internet.

=== Acquisitions ===
On May 19, 2013, the Wall Street Journal reported that Yahoo's board had approved an all-cash deal to purchase the six-year-old blogging website Tumblr. The announcement was reported to signify a changing trend in the technology industry, as large corporations like Yahoo, Facebook, and Google acquired start-up Internet companies that generate low amounts of revenue as a way in which to connect with sizeable, fast-growing online communities. The Wall Street Journal stated that the purchase of Tumblr would satisfy the company's need for "a thriving social-networking and communications hub." Yahoo would pay $1.1 billion for Tumblr, and the company's CEO and founder David Karp would remain a large shareholder. In June 2013, Yahoo! moved the official Yahoo! blog from Yahoo! Yodel to Tumblr, using the URL yahoo.tumblr.com.

Other acquisitions early in Mayer's tenure included Stamped in October 2012, OnTheAir in December 2012, social news start-up Snip.it in January 2013, Summly in March 2013, and Xobni and Qwiki in July 2013. Xobni's former CEO Jeff Bonforte became senior vice president of communications products. On August 2, 2013, Yahoo! announced its acquisition of social web browser concern RockMelt. With the acquisition, the RockMelt team, including the concern's CEO Eric Vishria and CTO Tim Howes, became part of Yahoo team. As a result, all the RockMelt apps and existing web services were scheduled to cease on August 31, 2013.

The media reported on Yahoo!'s interest in the video streaming site Hulu on May 26, 2013. Under Mayer's leadership, Yahoo!'s bid was worth between $600 and $800 million, as a variety of options that consisted of different circumstances were put forward by the company. As of May 28, 2013, Yahoo!'s videos attracted 45 million unique visitors a month, while Hulu had 24 million visitors. The combination of the two audiences would have placed Yahoo! in the second-most popular position after Google and its subsidiary YouTube.

In February 2014, Yahoo! acquired social diary company Wander and Distill, a technical recruiting company. Two more acquisitions followed in July 2014: RayV, a video streaming platform, and Flurry, a mobile ad company. The next month, Yahoo! acquired advertising startup ClarityRay, and in 2015, Yahoo! Japan announced plans to buy travel booking site Ikyu for approximately $830 million.

=== Sale to Verizon and Mayer's departure ===
On January 9, 2017, Yahoo! CEO Marissa Mayer announced that she would step down from Yahoo's board of directors if the company's $4.5 billion sale to Verizon (first agreed to in July 2016) went through. She also announced that when that deal closed Yahoo! would rename itself to Altaba. Yahoo! was officially acquired by Verizon in June 2017. Its assets were consolidated in the subsidiary company Oath, and Yahoo! ceased to exist as an independent corporate entity.

== Under Verizon ownership (2018–2021) ==
In April 2018, Yahoo sold Flickr to SmugMug. Yahoo announced in April 2021 that Yahoo Answers would shut down the following month.

Yahoo's parent company, Oath, rebranded to Verizon Media Group in January 2019. In May 2021, Apollo Global Management entered an agreement with Verizon to acquire Verizon Media (Yahoo! and AOL Brands) for $5 billion. The new company would be known as Yahoo at the close of the deal. The acquisition and renaming completed in September.
