= Srinija Srinivasan =

Tech businessperson

Srinija Srinivasan was hired in 1995 as the fifth employee of Yahoo! by founders Jerry Yang and David Filo to "organize the content." Srinivasan left Yahoo! in 2010 while serving as a vice-president and editor-in-chief. Srinivasan co-founded music start-up, Loove.

== Early life and education ==
Srinivasan holds a B.S degree, 1993, from Stanford University in Symbolic Systems. In 2000, Srinivasan became a Henry Crown Fellow of the Aspen Institute and was also a member of the Aspen Global Leadership Network. In 2010, she was appointed to the White House Commission on Presidential Scholars.

== Career in technology ==
=== Yahoo ===
Srinivasan was hired in 1995 as the fifth employee of Yahoo! by founders Jerry Yang and David Filo to "organize the content." She left Yahoo! in 2010 while serving as a vice-president and editor-in-chief.

Before coming to Yahoo!, she worked on the Cyc Project, an artificial intelligence project to create a database of human commonsense knowledge.

== Public service ==
In 2010, Srinivasan was appointed by United States President Obama to the United States Commission on Presidential Scholars, a federal program to commemorate the achievement of distinguished graduating high school students.

She was elected to Stanford University's board of trustees in 2014.
