= Thomas J. McInerney (executive) =

American businessman

Thomas J. McInerney is Chairman of Match Group, where he is also a director. We was the former and last president and CEO of Altaba, and also serves on the boards of HSN Inc. and Interval Leisure Group Inc. He was the Executive Vice President and Chief Financial Officer of IAC/InterActiveCorp. He served on the special committee set up at Yahoo! to investigate the CEO's misstated college degree.

He graduated from Yale College and Harvard Business School.
