= Alfred Amoroso =

American business executive (born 1950)

Fred Amoroso
- Born: 1950 (age 75–76)
- Education: Polytechnic University of Brooklyn
- Known for: Former president and CEO of Rovi; Former chairman at Yahoo!
- Spouse: Regina Amoroso
- Children: 4

Alfred J. Amoroso (born 1950) is an American business executive. He has held multiple high-level positions in businesses including Rovi Corporation and Yahoo!

== Biography ==
Amoroso has a bachelor's degree in systems engineering and a Master's in operations research from the Polytechnic University of Brooklyn, now part of New York University.

After college, Amoroso worked for Electronic Data Systems (EDS) for a number of years in Texas, Illinois and Connecticut. He left EDS to found Computech, a systems consulting firm based in Bloomfield, Connecticut. It was acquired in 1985 by Price Waterhouse Consulting and he stayed on as a managing partner for several years. He was then recruited by IBM and worked in multiple capacities between November 1993 to October 1999, including serving as a member of the worldwide management committee. He was named president, CEO and director of CrossWorlds Software, Inc. in November 1999, holding the roles until the company's merger with IBM in January 2002. Amoroso was also an advisor to Warburg Pincus, a private equity investment firm, from September 2004 to June 2005. He served on the board of Foundry Networks from October 2000 to December 2008 and as chairman from January 2007 to December 2008, when it was sold to Brocade Communications Systems.

From July 2002 to August 2004, Amoroso was the president, CEO, and vice chairman of META Group, an information technology research and advisory firm based in Stamford, Connecticut. The company was acquired by Macrovision in 2006 and he later served as president, CEO and director of Macrovision, which was renamed Rovi Corporation in 2009. Amoroso stepped down as CEO of Rovi in 2011 and was succeeded by Thomas Carson. Amoroso joined the board of Yahoo! in February 2012 and oversaw the special committee assembled to investigate Scott Thompson's degree legitimacy. He was chosen as the new board chairman in May 2012 after Thompson's departure. He stepped down in April 2013 and left the board in June 2013. He was temporarily replaced in the chairman role by director Maynard Webb Jr.

He joined ModuleQ's advisory board in April 2015. He continues to serve on the Bridge Restoration Ministry board, which he has been part of since at least 2012.

== Personal life ==
He and his wife Regina have four children.
