= Webjay =

Web-based playlist service

Webjay logo

Webjay was a web-based playlist service launched in early 2004. Playlists consisted of links to Vorbis, MP3, WMA, RealAudio and/or other audio files on the web. Webjay users could create new playlists by copying from existing playlists, or by web scraping audio file links from external web pages or playlists. The site was created by Lucas Gonze.

Yahoo! announced its acquisition of Webjay on January 9, 2006. It closed down the Webjay site at the end of June, 2007.

Web scraping portions of Webjay were incorporated into the Yahoo! products Yahoo! Media Player and Easy Listener.

The Webjay logo was created by Perri Harper.

== Copyright issues ==
Although Webjay did not host any files, it made an effort to avoid potential copyright disputes by removing links upon request of the content or host owner. The site's copyright policy included this statement:

Even though we won't censor users, we would be grateful if users would censor themselves. Webjay exists to promote music which has been authorized for distribution on the web, not to make it easier to find unauthorized music. Please do not post links to unauthorized music. It will bring trouble. It will promote hoarded music at the expense of music libre. It will be stupid -- posting hoarded music on the web is a really bad idea.

== Explanations by third parties ==
A July 15, 2004 story in The New York Times titled "Multimedia Scrapbooks to Share" described the site this way:

A handful of Web users are programming their own virtual TV newscasts and eclectic collections of video clips using a free media-sharing tool called Webjay (www.webjay.org). The site makes it easy to build, share and watch playlists of audio and video links culled from around the Internet.

A March 30, 2004 story in Jon Udell's blog titled "Blogs + playlists = collaborative listening" described the site this way:

There are a bunch of things that frustrate me about playlists. Competing formats: m3u, smil. Inconsistent behavior: if you want your tunes (and associated images) to render as you expect, you're looking at an insane test matrix. Crappy metadata: missing or incomplete, and often hard to find. Despite all these irritations I find myself returning to Webjay for the same reasons I write this blog and read others. What I know, I want to share with others. What others know, I want to know too. If it's easy to buy music online, I sometimes will. But first it has to be easy to find, listen to, talk about, and share tunes.

An April 22, 2004 story in The New York Times described the site this way:

Webjay.org, a new site, helps uncover links to songs by making it easy for users to create and share playlists of songs on the Web. When you click on a playlist, the site assembles the links into a seamless radio show that you can listen to without any messy downloading. Think of it as a mix tape you can share and change at will.

== Relationship to XSPF ==
The XSPF playlist format evolved from Webjay in the following way.

Webjay predated the common practice (in 2008) of having a web playlist be edited and managed by a single site, then exported to other sites with a Flash widget that can play the playlist.

Playlists on Webjay were played by generating a text file in one of a variety of common playlist formats, including ASX, SMIL, and M3U. The playlist file contained a list of URLs of multimedia files from different third party sites. The playlists were downloaded to a client-side media player like Windows Media Player, RealAudio, QuickTime, or Winamp. The client-side media player would play the URLs one after another, giving the cumulative impression of a single continuous stream.

After the XSPF playlist format came into existence and before any media players could render an XSPF playlist, Webjay added the ability to generate an XSPF file for any playlists on the site. It did not provide a player, only playlists, so at first the files could not be played. An independent developer created an XSPF player known as XSPF Musicplayer. It did not provide playlists. Webjay and XSPF Musicplayer were independent products that were only useful as a pair. Another independent developer created a web site to put Webjay and XSPF Musicplayer together. This site was called "Webjay Wizard".

Because XSPF Musicplayer is written in Flash it can be used in the browser without launching a client-side multimedia player like Windows Media Player. As a result, it was used to embed music in pages on social networking sites such as Myspace, as a Web widget. This created popular demand for XSPF.

Other XSPF players came into being to compete with XSPF Musicplayer. When Webjay was closed down by Yahoo!, other XSPF editing and generation tools took its place. XSPF continued to exist.
