= Altaba =

American investment company, formerly known as Yahoo Inc.

Altaba Inc.
- Altaba Inc. logo
- Formerly: Yahoo! Inc. (1995–2017)
- Type: Public
- Traded as: Nasdaq: AABA
- Industry: Investment company
- Predecessor: Yahoo! Inc.
- Founded: January 1994; 32 years ago (as Jerry and David's Guide to the World Wide Web); March 2, 1995; 31 years ago (as Yahoo!); June 17, 2017 (as Altaba)
- Founders: Jerry Yang; David Filo
- Defunct: October 4, 2019
- Fate: Dissolution
- Headquarters: New York City, New York, United States
- Key people: Thomas J. McInerney (president and CEO)
- Revenue: $333 million (2018)
- Subsidiaries: Excalibur IP, LLC
- Website: www.altaba.com

Altaba Inc. was a non-diversified, closed-end management investment company based in New York City that was formed from the remains of the first incarnation of Yahoo! Inc. after Verizon had acquired old Yahoo's Internet business. Verizon completed its acquisition on June 13, 2017, and put the assets under a new subsidiary named Yahoo! Holdings within its newly created division, Oath (now the current incarnation of Yahoo! Inc.). After the transaction, Yahoo! Inc. had no operating business but retained its cash holdings, partnership investments and bond portfolio, as well as certain patents that Verizon did not purchase. It reorganized as an investment fund and changed its name to Altaba Inc. on June 16. The only Yahoo!-branded interest held by Altaba was its stake in the joint venture Yahoo! Japan, which it sold to the SoftBank Group in late 2018.

== History ==
=== 1994–2017: Yahoo! Inc. ===
In January 1994, Jerry Yang and David Filo, who were Electrical Engineering graduate students, created a website called "Jerry and David's Guide to the World Wide Web". The Guide was a directory of other websites, organized in a hierarchy, as opposed to a searchable index of pages. In April 1994, Jerry and David's Guide to the World Wide Web was renamed "Yahoo!". The word "YAHOO" is a backronym for "Yet Another Hierarchically Organized Oracle" or "Yet Another Hierarchical Officious Oracle." The yahoo.com domain was created on January 18, 1995.

Yahoo! grew rapidly throughout the 1990s and diversified into a web portal, followed by numerous high-profile acquisitions. The company's stock price skyrocketed during the dot-com bubble and closed at an all-time high of US$118.75 in 2000; however, after the dot-com bubble burst, it reached an all-time low of US$8.11 in 2001. Yahoo! formally rejected an acquisition bid from the Microsoft Corporation in 2008. In early 2012, the largest layoff in Yahoo!'s history was completed and 2,000 employees (14 percent of the workforce) lost their jobs.

Carol Bartz replaced co-founder Jerry Yang as CEO in January 2009, but was fired by the board of directors in September 2011; Tim Morse was appointed as interim CEO following Bartz's departure. Former PayPal president Scott Thompson became CEO in January 2012 and after he resigned was replaced by Ross Levinsohn as the company's interim CEO on May 13, 2012. On July 16, former Google executive Marissa Mayer, became the CEO of the company.

The media reported on Yahoo!'s interest in the video streaming site Hulu on May 26, 2013. Under Mayer's leadership, Yahoo!'s bid is worth between US$600 and $800 million, as a variety of options that consist of different circumstances were put forward by the company. As of May 28, 2013, Yahoo!'s videos attract 45 million unique visitors a month, while Hulu has 24 million visitors—the combination of the two audiences can place Yahoo! in the second-most popular position after Google and its subsidiary YouTube.

Data collated by comScore during July 2013 revealed that more people in the U.S. visited Yahoo! websites during the month in comparison to Google websites—the occasion was the first time that Yahoo! outperformed Google since 2011. The data did not incorporate visit statistics for the Yahoo!-owned Tumblr website or mobile phone usage.

On September 22, 2016, Yahoo disclosed a data breach in which hackers stole information associated with at least 500 million user accounts in late 2014. According to the BBC, this was the largest technical breach reported to date. Specific details of material taken include names, email addresses, telephone numbers, encrypted or unencrypted security questions and answers, dates of birth, and encrypted passwords. The breach used manufactured web cookies to falsify login credentials, allowing hackers to gain access to any account without a password. On December 14, 2016 a separate data breach, occurring earlier around August 2013 was reported. This breach affected over 1 billion user accounts and is again considered the largest discovered in the history of the Internet.

On June 13, 2017, following the departure of Marissa Mayer, Thomas J. McInerney was appointed chairman and CEO of Yahoo! Inc.

=== 2017–2019: Altaba Inc. ===
On June 16, 2017, the company that remained after Verizon Communications purchased the core Internet businesses of Yahoo! Inc. was renamed Altaba Inc. The new company, listed by the Securities and Exchange Commission as a "non-diversified, closed-end management investment company," immediately began trading on NASDAQ under the ticker symbol AABA.

In September 2018, Altaba settled three lawsuits relating to Yahoo's data breaches for $47 million.

On September 17, 2018, Altaba announced the sale of their stake in Yahoo Japan Corporation for $4.3 billion. On the same day, Altaba announced a $5.75 billion share repurchase program.

On April 3, 2019, Altaba announced in a press release that it would sell its stake in Alibaba Group and shut down. The company would shut down in the fourth quarter of 2019.

On October 2, 2019, Altaba stopped trading on the Nasdaq at the close of the day, and pursuant to its Plan of Complete Liquidation and Dissolution, filed a certificate of dissolution in Delaware (where Altaba is domiciled), on October 4. A small amount of funds will be withheld for potential Chinese taxes on the sale of its stake in the Alibaba Group. In 2020, the company sold the Excalibur IP patent portfolio to RPX Corporation.

== Assets ==
Excalibur IP, a patent company owned by Altaba, controlled a significant minority interest in Alibaba Group (16.3%) until it sold its stake in 2019, and maintained investments in Hortonworks, Gomaji, Envestnet, Rimage Corporation, SeatGeek, Protagenic Therapeutics, Eastman Kodak Company, and Paperless Post. The Fund's external investment advisors included BlackRock Advisors, LLC and Morgan Stanley Smith Barney LLC.

The company divested itself of all holdings in Snap Inc. (the owner of Snapchat) and Yahoo! Japan.
