= Third Point =

Hedge fund company in New York, US

Third Point LLC
- Formerly: Third Point Management Company L.L.C. (1995–2006)
- Industry: Investment management
- Founded: 1995; 31 years ago
- Founder: Daniel S. Loeb
- Headquarters: 55 Hudson Yards, New York City, U.S.
- Key people: Daniel S. Loeb (CEO & CIO)
- Products: Hedge fund
- AUM: US$11.5 billion (2024)
- Website: thirdpoint.com

Third Point LLC is a New York-based hedge fund founded by Daniel S. Loeb in 1995. The firm operates as an employee-owned and SEC-registered investment advisor.

Third Point primarily invests in public equity, fixed income, and ADR markets globally and deploys an investment strategy that capitalizes on companies "undergoing events such as spinoffs or bankruptcies and pushes for corporate change". It also manages Third Point Reinsurance, a property and casualty reinsurer, and Third Point Offshore Investors, a UK-based closed-end investment company. Third Point's funds include: Third Point Partners, Third Point Opportunities Master Fund, Third Point Ultra Master Fund, and Third Point Resources. Third Point Ventures, its capital arm, invests in startup technology alternative energy and clean technology companies.

Headquartered in New York City, the firm also has six additional offices: in Sunnyvale, California; Los Angeles, California; Stamford, Connecticut; Bangalore, India; Hong Kong; and London.

== Stakeholdings ==
=== Massey Energy ===
After a proxy fight, Third Point announced in June 2006 that Loeb and an ally, Todd Q. Swanson, would join the board of Massey Energy, the fourth-largest coal producer in the United States. The New York Times reported that Third Point owned 5.9% of Massey and that Loeb had been "feuding with the company for several months", criticizing the management and bringing attention to executive trips to the Bahamas, Las Vegas, and West Palm Beach, Florida, on the company jet.

In one note, Loeb wrote, "Massey's C.E.O. is provided a company-owned home to live in ... In fact, after he leaves the company, the house is to be given to him as a parting gift. No one else at the company gets free housing, much less an entire home as a retirement gift. What kind of example does it set when a C.E.O. who makes $33.7 million in a single year is given free housing while the company is having difficulty retaining its mine workers?"

=== Acorda Therapeutics ===
In February 2007, Loeb asked Acorda Therapeutics, in which Third Point had a 9.9% stake, to sell itself to a larger U.S. pharmaceutical firm, arguing that a larger company with more experience "would be able to expedite Fampridine SR", a multiple sclerosis drug produced by Acorda, through the Food and Drug Administration (FDA) approval process "and into the hands of patients more quickly and efficiently". He argued that if Acorda were to continue going it alone or to seek partnership with a European firm it "would be a tremendous injustice not only to multiple sclerosis patients, who should receive such an effective drug in the most expeditious manner possible, but also to your public shareholders, who have supported Fampridine SR's development". His letter sent Acorda shares up nearly 6.9%.

Acorda responded with a statement indicating that its board of directors "continually evaluates ways to maximize shareholder value and to serve the best interests of all shareholders". In May 2007, Third Point disclosed that it had lowered its stake in Acorda to 4.1%.

=== Yahoo ===
==== Board appointment ====
After Third Point disclosed its stake in Yahoo on September 8, 2011, calling for the resignations of four directors, Yahoo set up a conference call with Loeb, Jerry Yang of Yahoo, and one of the directors in question, Roy Bostock. Loeb said that the conversation concluded with "Mr. Bostock's abrupt unilateral termination of the call". Bostock, however, claimed that he had "said that he had other shareholders to attend to and ended the phone call".

Loeb informed Yahoo CEO Scott Thompson in a March 2012 letter that Third Point wanted four seats on the firm's board. At the time Third Point owned about 5.3% of the firm. Yahoo sought to compromise by accepting one of Loeb's board nominees, Harry Wilson, a restructuring specialist, plus "another candidate acceptable to the two sides", but Loeb insisted on being added himself to the board. Yahoo refused, telling Loeb, according to his own account, that "my experience and knowledge 'would not be additive to the Board' and that as Yahoo's largest outside shareholder, I would be 'conflicted' as a Director. ... Only in an illogical Alice-in-Wonderland world would a shareholder be deemed to be conflicted from representing the interests of other shareholders because he is, well, a shareholder too." Loeb charged that the "Board's evaluation of our candidates" made "a mockery of good principles of corporate governance". In response to Yahoo's charge that Third Point was a "short-term investor", Loeb responded that "this 'long-term vs. short-term' excuse is a canard and particularly inapt in the case of Yahoo. If there ever was a company in need of a sense of urgency, it is this one". Loeb added that the "real issue is not short-term versus long-term but about Board representatives who have skin in the game and will exercise sound business judgment".

In a May 2012 letter to Yahoo's directors, Loeb noted that according to Yahoo's filings with the U.S. Securities and Exchange Commission, newly hired CEO Scott Thompson had a bachelor's degree in accounting and computer science, whereas a simple Google search revealed that his degree was "in accounting only"; Thompson resigned ten days later. On the same day, Loeb, Wilson, and another Third Point candidate, Michael J. Wolf, were named to the Yahoo's board.

==== Resignation from board ====
Marissa Mayer's appointment as CEO to replace Thompson was seen as the culmination of Loeb's efforts to transform Yahoo. Loeb, Wilson, and Wolf submitted their resignations from Yahoo's board in July 2013, and Yahoo bought back 40 million shares from Third Point, leaving the hedge fund's ownership at less than 2%, so the three executives had to leave. However, the hedge fund gained a profit of $1 billion. Marissa Mayer issued a statement praising Loeb: "Daniel Loeb had the vision to see Yahoo for its immense potential...While there's still a lot of work ahead, they've given us a great foundation". Steven Davidoff of New York Times observed that Yahoo "seem[ed] like damaged goods now that it has been abandoned by one of its biggest investors, Daniel S. Loeb", noting that Yahoo's share buyback had "the whiff of greenmail, or repurchasing stock to make an investor go away".

According to a January 2014 Vanity Fair profile, when Loeb told Mayer he wanted to sell "20 million shares, or one-third of his remaining holdings", Mayer stated Yahoo would (buy back the stock at a guaranteed $29.11 per share)—but only if he sold 40 million shares. This transaction would "bring Loeb's stake below the 2 percent threshold, which meant that he and the other two representatives would have to leave the board". Loeb also signed a standstill agreement in 2013 that bars him from activist investing in Yahoo until 2018.

=== Sotheby's ===
Loeb's announcement in August 2013 stated that he acquired a 5.7% stake in Sotheby's, causing its shares to rise 3%. Sotheby's announced in September 2013 that it "was considering moves like a share repurchase or raising its dividend", a response to Third Point's having raised its stake in the company. The New York Times reported that Sotheby's share price had "climbed about 5 percent since Third Point disclosed its increased stake".

Loeb disclosed on October 2, 2013, that he was now Sotheby's largest shareholder, with a 9.3% stake. On the same date he announced his desire to join Sotheby's board and called for the resignation of chairman and CEO William F. Ruprecht. "Sotheby's is like an old master painting in desperate need of restoration", Loeb wrote in a letter to the SEC, charging that a "crisis of management" at the firm had resulted in "dysfunctional divisions and a fractured culture", as well as "chronically weak operating margins and deteriorating competitive position relative to Christie's", Sotheby's main competitor. The firm, he wrote, required new directors and needed for the positions of chairman and CEO to be filled by two different persons, not one. In a later statement, Loeb said that "Sotheby's malaise is a result of a lack of leadership and strategic vision at its highest levels", criticized Ruprecht's $6.3 million salary, and chastised the Sotheby's directors for spending "hundreds of thousands of dollars" in shareholder funds on a single extravagant meal banquet.

Sotheby's replied to Loeb with a statement maintaining that its "actions as a leader in the global art business have been producing superior results—including a share price increase exceeding the Standard & Poor's MidCap Index over the one, five and ten year periods".

Adam Lindeman of the New York Observer, in an article headlined "Barbarians at Sotheby's Gate?", suggested that the "firefight" between Loeb and Sotheby's would "benefit Sotheby's", a place Lindeman described as having "a British, clubby feeling of privilege and stuffy pedigree", compared to the "considerably warmer" feel of Christie's.

Ruprecht announced his resignation in November 2014, sending Sotheby's shares up around 7% a day.

=== Sony ===
Loeb criticized the poor performance of Sony's summer 2013 films After Earth and White House Down in a letter issued that year, expressing concern that Sony CEO Kazuo Hirai "does not worry about a division that has just released 2013's versions of Waterworld and Ishtar back-to-back". Loeb proposed a "partial spinoff" (handing about 15% to 20% to existing shareholders) of Sony's entertainment business", and even offered to "backstop the initial public offering up to $2 billion to ensure its success". "Given entertainment's perpetual underperformance", Loeb wrote, "perhaps Sony's reluctance to discuss it candidly stems from (understandable) embarrassment". In addition to asking Sony to spin off its entertainment assets, Loeb sought a spinoff of its financial services division. Loeb's letter sent Sony stock up about 10%. At the time Third Point was Sony's largest shareholder with a 6.5% stake.

Sony's board announced on May 22, 2013, that it was considering Loeb's proposal to spin off its entertainment division. "We will engage in thorough discussions at the board level to decide on Sony's response ... [I]t is an important matter that relates to Sony's core businesses and management, so the board must hold ample discussions", Hirai said. The New York Times noted that Japanese corporations "have a history of ignoring letters from shareholders calling for overhauls".

Hirai ultimately rejected Loeb's suggestion, saying, "Sony's entertainment businesses are critical to our corporate strategy and will be important drivers of growth, and I am firmly committed to assuring their growth, to improving their profitability and to aggressively leveraging their collaboration with our electronics and service business". One factor in Hirai's decision was the counsel of advisers who argued, "that subsidiary initial public offerings have rarely succeeded". Sony's sole concession to Loeb was an agreement "to disclose more information about the entertainment unit's financials". Third Point expressed disappointment in Sony's decision, but welcomed "Sony's commitment to greater transparency".

=== MGM ===
The Hollywood Reporter reported in May 2013 that Loeb was buying up shares of MGM, leading CNBC commentators to note that Loeb, who already owned stakes in Yahoo, Sony, and Virgin Media, seemed to be "becoming something of a media mogul". Bloomberg noted in September 2013 that Third Point was now "one of MGM's top five owners, according to a person with knowledge of the situation".

=== Fanuc ===
In late 2014, Third Point took a stake in Fanuc, a robotics and computer numerical controls firm. Prior, Fanuc seldom made direct contact with its investors but in March 2014, the company decided "it would start talking to shareholders" and "return some of its cash to them." Loeb has met with Fanuc's President, Yoshiharu Inaba, with encouragement from Japan's government officials, who are aiming to "shak[e] up companies' slothful boards."

=== Ligand Pharmaceuticals ===
After Ligand Pharmaceuticals hired John Higgins as its new CEO in January 2007, Third Point Management invested in the biotech firm and was able to cut its losses. Since 2011, Ligand Pharmaceuticals tripled its stocks and doubled its revenue to $65 million.

=== Baxter International ===
In August 2015, Third Point took a 7 percent stake, over $2 billion, in Baxter International. In a letter to Baxter's board, Loeb wrote that he was "most impressed" by the company's willingness to consider adding new directors to go along with a new CEO and requested for Baxter CEO Robert Parkinson for two seats on the board. Baxter reached a settlement with Third Point agreeing to add Munib Islam to its board. Loeb also disapproved of the board's current setup, in which directors do not face re-election every year, and described it as "shareholder-unfriendly and archaic." Baxter then agreed to hold annual elections for its board of directors after Loeb's criticism.

In December 2018, Third Point sold 22.2% of its stake in Baxter, dropping holdings to 28,008,125 shares. The sale was completed at a price of $68.62 per share.

=== Nestlé ===
In June 2017, Third Point disclosed its ownership in approximately 40 million shares of Nestlé, making it the company's sixth-largest shareholder according to Standard & Poor's Global Market Intelligence.

=== Netflix ===
In the fourth quarter of 2017, Third Point acquired 2 million shares or a .46 percent stake in Netflix, making it the ninth-largest equity long holding in the fund.

== Third Point funds ==
Third Point LLC serves as the investment manager of Third Point Partners Qualified L.P., Third Point Partners L.P., Third Point Offshore Master Fund L.P., and Third Point Ultra Master Fund L.P. Third Point Partners is Third Point's oldest fund.

According to CNBC, Third Point has ranked among the industry's best performers, returning an average of 19 percent a year since its launch. A list of current investment holdings is available here.

=== Third Point Re ===
Third Point Reinsurance Ltd., through its class 4 reinsurance company, Third Point Reinsurance Company Ltd., is a Bermuda-based specialty property and casualty reinsure. Together they are known as Third Point Re. The firm was incorporated on October 6, 2011. Its investable assets are managed by Third Point LLC, and Loeb is one of its founding shareholders. Third Point Re directly owns its own investments, which, according to its website, "are held in a separate account and managed by Third Point LLC on substantially the same basis as its main hedge funds, including Third Point Partners L.P., the original Third Point LLC hedge fund". A.M. Best Company gave Third Point Re an A− (Excellent) financial strength rating in January 2012. Since 1995, Third Point Re has generated one of the best long-term investment track records in history, averaging 19.5% annual returns.

Third Point Re raised approximately $276 million in an IPO in August 2013. That same month, it was reported that Third Point Re qualified as an "emerging growth company" under the Jumpstart Our Business Startups (JOBS) Act.

=== Third Point Offshore Investors Ltd. ===
Third Point Offshore Investors Limited is a closed-ended limited liability investment company registered and incorporated in Guernsey. It was listed on the London Stock Exchange in 2007. "We believe that we will be the first U.S. hedge fund to list a single manager fund on the London Stock Exchange", Loeb said.

==== 2010 letter about Bernanke ====
In a December 2010 letter to investors, Loeb described a recent 60 Minutes interview with Federal Reserve chairman Ben S. Bernanke as "a staged infomercial rather than a serious interview". In the letter he largely rejected the "narrative" that Bernanke had constructed around the 2008 financial crisis and the Fed's response to it.

Bernanke's "narrative arc...posits that the global economy would have collapsed and unemployment would have exceeded levels of the Great Depression had the Fed not intervened to rescue the financial system. Having set the stage for how we were saved from global financial Armageddon once before and therefore ought to trust the Fed's intervention blindly again, Chairman Bernanke's next chapter states that the Fed's latest $600 billion market intervention will alleviate our seemingly intractable high levels of unemployment, which otherwise would continue indefinitely", Loeb complained, rejecting Bernanke's "narrative" as contrary to "certain facts and our own experience – like the Fed's admitted inability to see the crisis coming or to regulate effectively the banks under its purview". Loeb called "Bernanke's devotion to the righteousness of his narrative" "striking", adding that "every actor in the financial system still ought to be asking how things went so terribly wrong", not inventing a narrative "that emancipates one from blame and promises future forecasting precision".

Loeb warned of "the dangers of believing too much in the stories we tell ourselves" and said that highly placed individual such as Bernanke should "be willing to search out facts and admit wrongdoing". At Third Point, Loeb wrote, "we are truth seekers and problem solvers. We must satisfy ourselves with determining ranges of outcomes and potential scenarios rather than searching for, and ultimately fabricating, absolute truths. The only thing we are 100 percent confident in is that we are fallible, we don't have all the answers, and we will make some mistakes".

==== Fairfax lawsuit ====
The Canadian insurance firm Fairfax Financial Holdings Ltd. sued Third Point and other hedge funds in a New Jersey state court in March 2011, charging that Loeb lied to investors when he stated that his "decision to short Fairfax-related positions" was the result of extensive research. New Jersey State Court Judge Stephan C. Hansbury granted the summary judgment motions of Third Point LLC, Daniel S. Loeb, and Jeffrey Perry in December 2011, dismissing the charges against them. "We are gratified that the Judge has put an end to this colossal waste of time and resources", said Third Point, describing the case as "a blatant case of forum shopping [and] a cynical attempt by Fairfax to manipulate the judicial system and to intimidate institutional investors who had legitimate concerns about Fairfax's financial position".
