= Daniel S. Loeb =

American businessman (born 1961)

Dan Loeb
- Born: Daniel Seth Loeb; December 18, 1961 (age 64); Santa Monica, California, U.S.
- Education: University of California, Berkeley; Columbia University (BA)
- Occupation: Hedge fund manager
- Employer: Third Point Management
- Known for: Founding and leading Third Point Management
- Spouse: Margaret Davidson Munzer (m. 2004)
- Children: 3

Daniel Seth Loeb (born December 18, 1961) is an American investor, hedge fund manager, and philanthropist. He is the founder and chief executive of Third Point, a New York-based hedge fund focused on event-driven, value-oriented investing with $4 billion in assets under management, as of December 2023. New York magazine noted that Loeb's "preferred strategy" is to buy into troubled companies, which "is the key to his success." Regarding his active involvement in the companies in which he invests, Loeb was described as "one of the most successful activists" in 2014.

== Early life and education ==
Loeb is the son of Ronald and Clare (née Spark) Loeb. He is a descendant of rabbi Levi Yitzchok of Berditchev. He was raised in Santa Monica, California, where he attended Palisades Charter High School. There he took AP classes, started a skateboard company, and was nicknamed "Milo Minderbinder" by one of his teachers (after a character in the novel Catch-22 who had a fascination with the stock market). His father was a partner at the Los Angeles law firm of Irell & Manella LLP and general counsel for Williams-Sonoma, Inc. Ronald Loeb also served as an outside director of Mattel, Inc. for over 30 years and during one period became interim president of Mattel. Clare Loeb, his mother, is a historian and independent scholar.

Loeb's great-aunt, Ruth Handler, created the Barbie doll and co-founded Mattel Inc.

Loeb attended the University of California, Berkeley for two years and subsequently graduated from Columbia University with a bachelor's degree in economics in 1983. At Columbia, he was a classmate of future President Barack Obama, whose presidential campaign he later offered significant financial support. By his senior year at Columbia, Loeb had made $120,000 in the stock market, but lost it all on an investment in a firm called Puritan-Bennett Inc. The loss taught him a lesson, he later said, in "overconcentrating positions".

== Investing career ==
From 1984 to 1987, Loeb worked at private equity firm Warburg Pincus. He then worked as director of corporate development at Island Records, a record label, where he focused on securing debt financing. After Island Records, Loeb worked as a risk arbitrage analyst at Lafer Equity Investors and then, from 1991 to 1994, as senior vice-president in the distressed debt department at Jefferies LLC, where he focused on bankruptcy analysis, trading bank loans and selling distressed securities. He moved on to become a Citigroup vice president from 1994 to 1995, in charge of high-yield bond sales.

=== Third Point Management ===
Loeb started Third Point Management in 1995 "with $3.3 million from family and friends". Under Loeb's guidance, Third Point Management's annualized returns since inception (Dec. 1996 – Dec. 2015) total approximately +16.2%. In 2012, the firm returned +21.2%, outperforming the S&P 500's return of +16.0% and making it one of best performing hedge funds that year.

In 2013, the firm returned +25.2%, while the S&P 500 returned +32.4%. Loeb appeared in Forbes' 2013 list of the world's 40 richest hedge-fund managers and traders. In 2014, the firm returned +5.7%, while the S&P 500 returned +13.7%. In 2015, the firm returned -1.4%, while the S&P 500 returned +1.4%. In 2017, it was reported the firm returned 18.1% net of fees in the first 11 months of the year.

==== Yahoo! ====
In 2012, Loeb, who through Third Point LLC, held 5.8% of Yahoo! stock, sought seats on the Yahoo! board for himself, former NBC Universal CEO Jeff Zucker, former Goldman Sachs executive Harry Wilson and former MTV Networks executive Michael J. Wolf.

On May 3, 2012, Loeb revealed that the new CEO of Yahoo!, Scott Thompson, did not have a computer science degree, as had been commonly assumed for many years. On May 13, 2012, Yahoo! announced that Thompson would be stepping down, and nominated Loeb, Wilson and Wolf to the Yahoo! board.

Marissa Mayer was then appointed as CEO to replace Thompson. In July 2013, Loeb, Wilson, and Wolf resigned from Yahoo!'s board, leaving Yahoo! with a seven-member board. Yahoo! agreed to buy back 40 million shares at $1.6 billion from Third Point.

==== Sony ====
In May 2013, Loeb proposed splitting Sony's entertainment and electronics businesses, arguing that such a split would increase profits.

On June 18, 2013, Third Point LLC announced it had increased its stake in Sony to 70 million shares, or about 7 percent, valued at $1.4 billion. According to Bloomberg.com, Sony's board of directors considered Loeb's proposal and hired Morgan Stanley and Citigroup, Inc. to evaluate it.

Actor George Clooney, whose Smokehouse Pictures production company has a contract with Sony's entertainment division, publicly opposed the proposal.

As of May 2014, Sony remained 12 percent lower than when Loeb first suggested for them to split. Sony had its sixth annual loss in seven years with shares dropping 8.8 percent as of May 2014. In February 2014, Sony said it would sell its PC business to buy out Japan industrial Partners Inc. and split its TV manufacturing unit into an independently operated entity. Ayano Iguchi, a company spokeswoman, said Sony was "focused on creating shareholder value by executing on our plan to revitalize and grow the electronics business, while further strengthening the entertainment and financial service businesses." Chris Konstantinos, director of international portfolio managements at RiverFront, stated that a breakup was "long overdue".

In October 2014, Loeb sold his shares in Sony and later wrote, "They have a long way to go and we continue to believe that more urgency will be necessary to definitively turn around the company's fortunes".

==== Sotheby's ====
In October 2013, Loeb issued a letter scrutinizing the governance of Sotheby's. It announced that Third Point had acquired "9.3% of the outstanding shares" and addressed Third Point's concerns regarding the governance of Sotheby's. These concerns are summarized as, "we are troubled by the Company's chronically weak operating margins and deteriorating competitive position relative to Christie's, as evidenced by each of the Contemporary and Modern art evening sales over the last several years." The letter expressed strong skepticism of Sotheby's international strategy—"Sotheby's is struggling internationally, lagging in newer markets like China and the Middle East"—and called for the removal of William Ruprecht from all his positions.

After Sotheby's instituted a "poison pill" to stop Third Point from growing its position past 10%, Third Point brought a lawsuit in the state of Delaware; however, on May 3, 2014, Vice Chancellor Donald Parsons of the Delaware Court of Chancery ruled that the auction house was justified in its use of the corporate action. On May 5, Loeb and Sotheby's reached an agreement, stipulating that Loeb, Olivier Reza and Harry J. Wilson join the board in exchange for Third Point having an ownership cap at 15%. William Ruprecht remained CEO and the proxy contest ceased.

After 35 years at Sotheby's, Ruprecht retired as CEO. On March 16, 2015, Sotheby's named Tad Smith as its new president and chief executive.

==== Fanuc ====
In late 2014, Loeb's Third Point took a stake in Fanuc, a robotics and computer numerical controls firm. Prior, Fanuc seldom made direct contact with its investors but in March 2014, the company decided "it would start talking to shareholders" and "return some of its cash to them." Loeb met with Fanuc's president, Yoshiharu Inaba, with encouragement from Japan's government officials, and was deemed a top prospect for "shaking up Japanese firms."

==== Ligand Pharmaceuticals ====
In January 2007, when John Higgins became CEO of Ligand Pharmaceuticals, Loeb bought into the biotech firm to cut its losses and grow revenue. Loeb invested $50 million, increased the company's profit to $250 million, and bought back $68 million in stock.

==== Seven & I ====
In April 2016, Loeb won a battle in his drive to shake up corporate Japan which had "been sheltered from agitating investors". Seven & I Holdings Co.'s board was planning to replace Ryuichi Isaka as head of the company however, Loeb recommended Isaka as a successor to Toshifumi Suzuki, chairman and chief executive. On April 7, Suzuki resigned after losing a boardroom dispute with Loeb. Loeb wrote in a March 27, 2016 letter to Seven & I directors, "Mr. Isaka should be rewarded—not demoted—for his performance and commitment to delivering results for shareholders ... This isn't a dynasty. This is a corporation." Loeb has pushed for the company to focus on its convenience store line while jettisoning its plans to expand its department and supermarket store franchises.

==== Nestlé ====
In June 2017, Third Point disclosed its ownership of approximately 40 million shares of Nestlé, making it the company's sixth-largest shareholder according to Standard & Poor's Global Market Intelligence.

==== Portfolio 2020 ====
His largest investments are in The Walt Disney Company, Amazon and Danaher Corporation. He owns 5.5 million shares of Disney, which are worth $718 million. Amazon is in second place with a value of $661 million. About 20% of his portfolio is technology services. It was also announced in October that Loeb had become a shareholder in Snowflake, a cloud data platform.

== Investment philosophy ==
New York magazine noted that Loeb's "preferred strategy" is to buy into troubled companies, replace inefficient management, and return the companies to profitability, which "is the key to his success."

=== Letters ===
On Wall Street, Loeb has a reputation for "financial savvy" and for "his withering criticism of corporate executives who are unfortunate enough to stumble in his sights". One of Loeb's signature tactics involves letter-writing:

Loeb is well known in Hedgeworld for his attacks on what he views as greedy execs who also happen to be depressing shareholder value of shares he owns. "The moral-indignation business", Loeb sometimes calls it. "Hedge-fund guys love to read Loeb's attacks; 'he articulates what people feel', says one."

Often these letters cite the results of investigations he has ordered, detailing management decisions and actions he considers detrimental to shareholder value. The letters usually accompany his government filings. Loeb once spent more than $4 million to increase his stake in a company to more than 5%, the statutory threshold requiring investor filings with the SEC, in order to file one of his letters criticizing the firm's management. According to New York magazine, "Loeb is proud of his letters, which are thorough, well argued, and filled with clever turns of phrase. (He had a batch prepared for his high-school English teacher.)" A 2005 New Yorker "The Talk of the Town" item described him as "a kind of investor's H. L. Mencken."

In a 2005 letter responding to a job inquiry by a U.K. fund manager, Loeb bristled at the applicant's reference to his (the applicant's) "place in society", telling the applicant that he would "have plenty of time to discuss your 'place in society' with the other fellows at the club." At Third Point, Loeb explained, "'one's place in society' does not matter at all. We are a bunch of scrappy guys from diverse backgrounds (Jewish, Muslim, Hindu etc) who enjoy outwitting pompous asses like yourself in financial markets globally." Similarly, in a September 2005 letter to Ligand Pharmaceuticals CEO David Robinson, Loeb expressed wonder that Ligand's board of directors had not shown Robinson "the door long ago—accompanied by a well worn boot planted in the backside."

Loeb sent a letter to John Collins, chairman and CEO of InterCept, in 2004, accusing InterCept of following "a 'good ol' boy' set of ethics", pointing out that InterCept employed Collins' daughter and son-in-law, the latter of whom Loeb had recently reached by phone on a golf course during working hours. Loeb further noted his discovery that InterCept leased a jet from a partnership controlled by Collins and another board member.

He wrote to Irik Sevin, CEO of Star Gas Partners, in February 2005, calling him "one of the most dangerous and incompetent executives in America" and accusing him of "ineptitude" and of using the firm as his "personal 'honey pot'". He wrote: "I was amused to learn, in the course of our investigation, that at Cornell University there is an 'Irik Sevin Scholarship'. One can only pity the poor student who suffers the indignity of attaching your name to his academic record." Loeb demanded the resignation from the firm's board of Sevin's "elderly 78-year old mom" and insisted that Sevin also "step down ... so that you can do what you do best: retreat to your waterfront mansion in the Hamptons where you can play tennis and hobnob with your fellow socialites."

A 2005 The New York Times article reported that many hedge-fund managers were now writing letters to the SEC demanding executives take specific actions and cited Loeb's letter to Sevin as exemplary of the genre, noting that three weeks after the letter was sent, "Sevin was gone, and a jubilant Mr. Loeb sent out an e-mail message to friends and associates declaring a 'huge victory for Third Point.'"

== Personal life ==
Loeb married Margaret Davidson Munzer on July 4, 2004, at his beach house in East Hampton, New York. The couple has three children.

By 2025, Loeb was leading Torah study groups in New York and said that he put on tefillin daily. He had also launched the Simchat Torah Challenge with Chabad, a nationwide Torah-study initiative reported to have more than 20,000 participants.

Loeb is a founding "Master Player" of Portfolios with Purpose, an annual virtual stock trading contest that raises money for charitable causes of the winning contestants' choice.

In 2014, Loeb was reported as one of a number of "prominent investors [who] have taken to Transcendental Meditation".

Loeb was co-chair of the Governors for Investors Industry (2013). He is a Trustee of Mount Sinai Health System, the Manhattan Institute, the U.S. Olympic Committee and the Los Angeles Museum of Contemporary Art. He is a member of the Council on Foreign Relations and of the National Council of the American Enterprise Institute.

Loeb sat on the Board of Directors of Sotheby's and was the chair of the Board of the Success Academy charter network.

== Political and economic views ==
Loeb has donated to the Democratic Senatorial Campaign Committee, Friends for Harry Reid, Obama for America, Forward Together PAC, Prosperity PAC, Straight Talk America, and the Volunteer PAC. In 2013, Loeb was a signatory to an amicus curiae brief submitted to the U.S. Supreme Court in Hollingsworth v. Perry, in support of same-sex marriage.

In 2015, Loeb, Paul Singer and Tim Gill helped fund Freedom For All Americans to promote LGBT issues in states and local communities in the United States.

Loeb has donated to both Democrats and Republicans. In the 2018 midterm election cycle, he gave over $1 million.

=== Israeli-Palestinian conflict ===
Loeb was involved in a long-standing WhatsApp group chat from October 2023 through early May 2024 with some of the United States' most powerful business leaders with the stated goals of "chang[ing] the narrative" in favor of Israel and "help[ing] win the war" on U.S. public opinion following Hamas's October 7th attack on Israel. Members of the group chat discussed how they received private briefings by, and worked closely with, members of the Israeli government, including former Israeli prime minister Naftali Bennett; Benny Gantz, a member of the Israeli war cabinet; and Israel's ambassador to the United States, Michael Herzog. Group members also held a video call in late April 2024 with New York City Mayor Eric Adams in an effort to, according to reporting by The Washington Post, "pressure Columbia’s president and trustees to permit the mayor to send police to the campus" to shut down violent antisemitic protests threatening dissenting students and faculty. During the video call, group members discussed making political donations to Adams. Loeb declined to comment about giving donations to Adams for this purpose.On July 16th 2024, Loeb donated $100,000 to Empowering Black Americans Super PAC. Empowering Black Americans overwhelmingly received funding from pro-Israel donors, and in the 2024 election cycle solely supported pro-Israel candidate Wesley Bell in his successful primary against Congresswoman Cori Bush. Loeb contributed an additional $200,000 in 2024 to the pro-Israel United Democracy Project (UDP) which spent heavily against Bush and other pro-Palestinian candidates. Loeb contributed a further $250,000 to UDP in 2025.

== Wealth and philanthropy ==
According to Forbes, his net worth is $3.5 billion as of April 2021.

=== Third Point Foundation ===
The Loeb Family - Third Point Foundation earned $6.39 million in profits in 2011 and had $45 million in assets at the end of 2016.

Loeb is heavily involved in education reform efforts, specifically supporting charter schools. As Chairman of the board of Success Academy Charter Schools in Brooklyn, New York, he pledged, in June 2013, to donate $3 million to Success Academy Charter Schools.

He endowed the Daniel S. Loeb Scholarship for undergraduate study at Columbia University. Since 2004, he has been a trustee of Prep for Prep, an organization in New York City that prepares underprivileged children to attend competitive private schools. He is active in the Jewish Enrichment Center, which provides young people with an education in Judaism. Additionally, he is a co-founder of Students First New York, the state branch of the national education advocacy organization.

On February 20, 2014, Loeb attended a discussion between the American Enterprise Institute and the Dalai Lama. The two worldviews debated the morality of capitalism and free enterprise. In Loeb's presentation, he said he practices Ashtanga yoga and applies yoga principles to his business and his decision-making. He noted that these principles aided in his decision to donate to a charter school in The Bronx, New York, which is now ranked third in New York State.

In October 2011, Loeb challenged three former Navy SEALs to run the "MightyMan" Half Iron Triathlon with him and his team in Montauk, New York. He made a sizable contribution for each Navy SEAL Foundation director who completed the triathlon to raise funds for the foundation.

In 2011, 2012, and 2013, Loeb and his wife made significant donations to the Alzheimer's Drug Discovery Foundation (ADDF), which funds over 400 Alzheimer's drug discovery programs in academic centers and biotechnology companies in 18 countries.

Loeb and his wife donate to the Leukemia and Lymphoma Society, Ovarian Cancer Research Fund, Chai Lifeline, and the Michael J. Fox Foundation.

=== Art collection ===
He is a prominent art collector and the walls at his Park Avenue office are covered with paintings", according to a New York Times August 26, 2013 article. At a Sotheby's auction in 2009, Manhattan dealer Larry Gagosian purchased Jeff Koons' Baroque Egg With Bow (Turquoise/Magenta) for $5.4 million from Loeb, who had bought it from the Gagosian Gallery in 2004 for about $3 million.

Loeb has traced his love of art to his student years at Columbia, when he saw Poussin's The Rape of the Sabine Women at the Metropolitan Museum of Art and took an art humanities class as part of the core curriculum. The "prep school kids" treated him like a "jerk", thinking they "all knew so much more", but in the end "I got one of two A's, and all the prep school snotty kids didn't."

Business Insider placed Loeb at the top of its list of "Wall Street's 25 Most Serious Art Collectors", noting he owns works by Mike Kelley, Richard Prince, Basquiat, Andy Warhol and Cindy Sherman, and that he "has his own curator."

=== Criminal justice reform ===
Loeb is an advocate for criminal justice reform and helps fund the Marshall Project, a nonprofit online journalism group, and the Brennan Center's Innocence Project. He is concerned with those unfairly imprisoned and successfully pushed for the release of Bernard Noble in April 2018, who served more than 7 years in prison for possessing two marijuana joints.
