= Roy J. Bostock =

American businessman

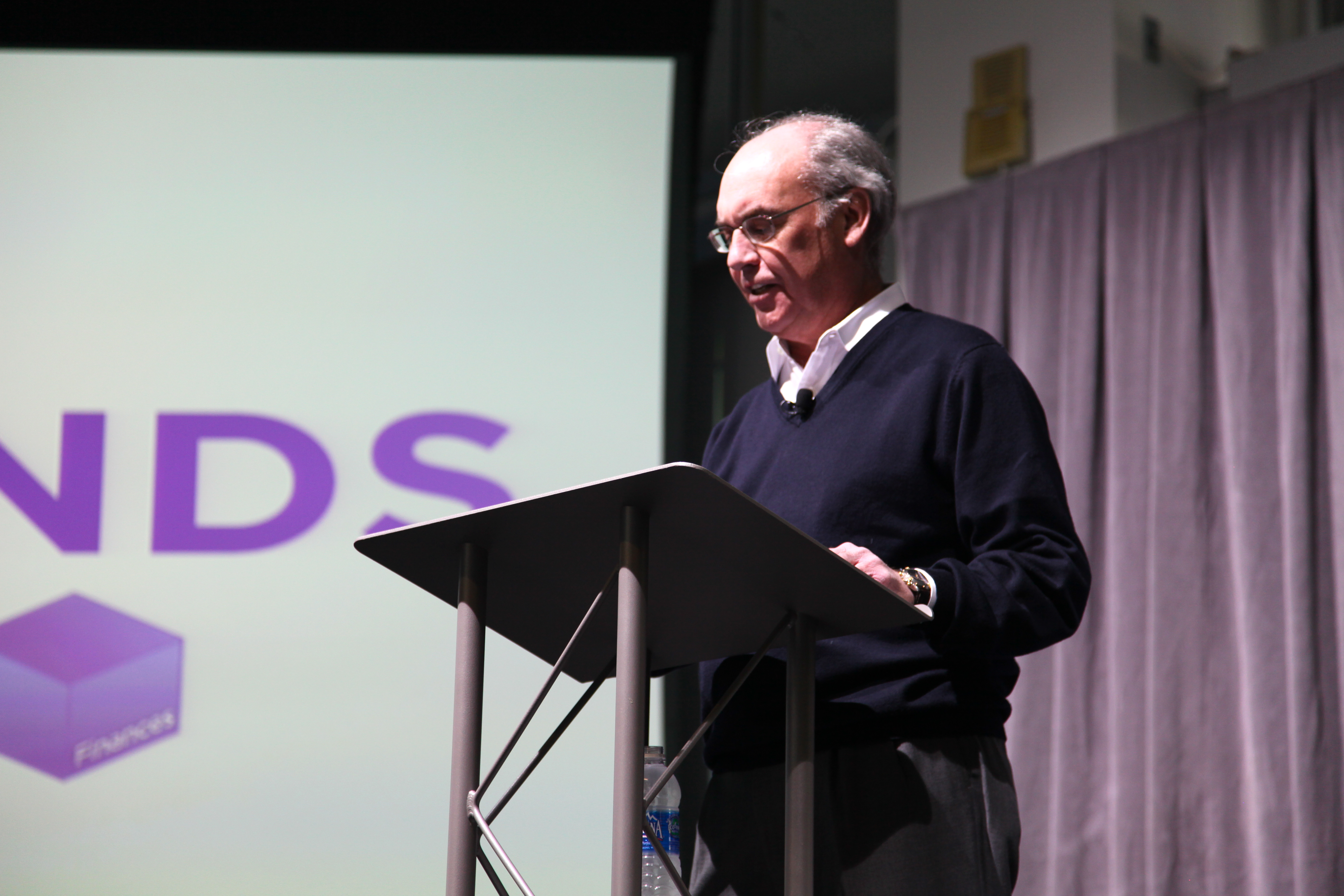
- Yahoo! Chairman Roy Bostock introduces Scott Thompson to Yahoos at Scott's first Yahoo! All Hands, in January 2012
- Education: Duke University; Harvard University
- Occupations: Investor, Business
- Spouse: Merilee Bostock

Roy J. Bostock is an American businessman, who was chairman of Yahoo! Inc. from January 2008 to May 2012. He is on the board of directors of Delta Air Lines. From 2000 to 2001 he was chairman of the advertising firm BCom3 Group, Inc. He is the former chairman of the Partnership for a Drug-Free America and is a Trustee Emeritus of Duke University. In July 2020 he was named chairman of cellular medicine startup GID BIO Inc., a company that has a potentially break-through treatment for osteoarthritis in late-stage regulatory review.

== Early life ==
Bostock is a 1962 Phi Beta Kappa graduate of Duke, where he was an English Literature major and a member of the varsity baseball and football teams. Bostock also received an MBA from Harvard Business School.

== Career ==
Bostock joined Benton & Bowles in 1964. Following the merger and subsequent creation of D'Arcy Masius Benton & Bowles in 1985, he was president of the combined company. From 1990 to 1996, he was chairman and CEO of the company. He also was chairman and CEO of the McManus Group from 1996 to 2000 and chairman of B/Com3 from 2000 to 2002.

On 6 September 2011 Bostock fired Yahoo CEO Carol Bartz by telephone after stormy weather prevented their scheduled face-to-face meeting. Third Point LLC, which has a 5.2% in Yahoo, called for Bostock's resignation along with the rest of the board for a number of reasons.

== Personal life ==
Bostock and his wife, Merilee, have donated more than $13 million to Duke University, and are the namesakes of Duke's Bostock Gates and Bostock Library. These donations include $2 million to Duke Libraries and $5 million to Duke Athletics. He has three children (Victoria, Matthew and Kate) and three grandchildren (Samuel, Anna and Luke Waters) who have all attended Duke University.
