= Yahoo =

American web portal

- Logo used since September 23, 2019
- Company type: Subsidiary
- Website type: Web portal and online services
- Founded: January 1994; 32 years ago
- Headquarters: Sunnyvale, California, United States
- Area served: Worldwide
- Owners: Apollo Global Management (90%); Verizon (10%)
- Founders: Jerry Yang; David Filo
- Products: List of products
- Revenue: $7.4 billion (2020)
- Employees: 8,600 (2017)
- Parent: Yahoo! Inc. (2021–present); Verizon Media (2019–2021); Oath Inc. (2017–2019); Yahoo! Inc. (1995–2017) (The old Yahoo!)
- Website: www.yahoo.com
- Advertising: Yahoo Ad Tech
- Registration: Optional
- Current status: Active

Yahoo (/ˈjɑːhuː/) is an American web portal based in Sunnyvale, California. It provides the search engine Yahoo Search and related services including My Yahoo, Yahoo Mail, Yahoo News, Yahoo Finance, Yahoo Sports, y!entertainment, yahoo!life, Yahoo Scout, and its advertising platform, Yahoo Native. It is operated by the namesake company Yahoo! Inc., which is 90% majority-owned by Apollo Global Management and 10% by Verizon.

Yahoo was established by Jerry Yang and David Filo in January 1994 and was one of the pioneers of the early Internet era in the 1990s. However, its use declined in the 2010s as some of its services were discontinued, and it lost market share to Facebook and Google.

== Etymology ==
The word "yahoo" is a backronym for "Yet another Hierarchically Organized Oracle" or "Yet Another Hierarchical Officious Oracle". The term "hierarchical" described how the Yahoo database was arranged in layers of subcategories. The term "oracle" was intended to mean "source of truth and wisdom", and the term "officious", rather than being related to the word's normal meaning, described the many office workers who would use the Yahoo database while surfing from work. However, founders Filo and Yang insist they mainly selected the name because they liked the slang definition of a "yahoo" (used by college students in David Filo's native Louisiana in the late 1980s and early 1990s to refer to an unsophisticated, rural Southerner): "rude, unsophisticated, uncouth." This meaning derives from the Yahoo race of fictional beings from Gulliver's Travels.

== History ==
=== Founding ===
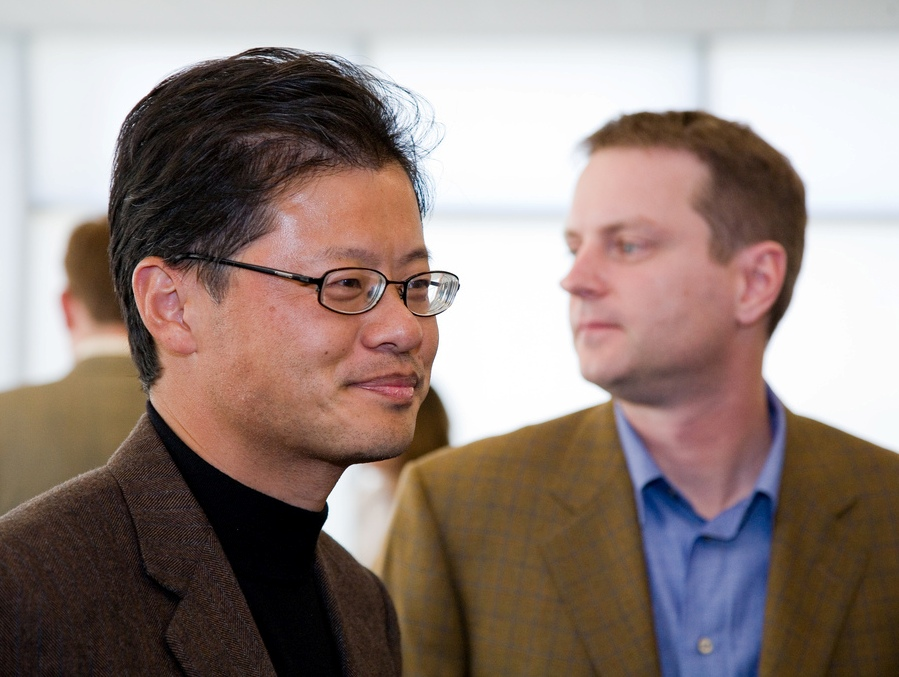
Jerry Yang and David Filo, the founders of Yahoo

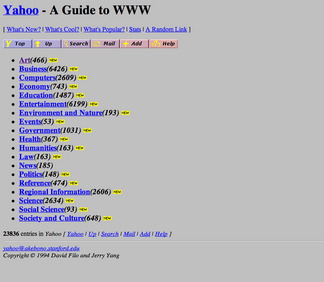
The Yahoo home page in 1994, when it was a directory. A search engine was added in 1995.

In January 1994, Jerry Yang and David Filo were electrical engineering graduate students at Stanford University, where they created a website named "Jerry and David's Guide to the World Wide Web". The site was a human-edited web directory, organized in a hierarchy, as opposed to a searchable index of pages. In March 1994, "Jerry and David's Guide to the World Wide Web" was renamed "Yahoo!" and became known as the Yahoo Directory. The "yahoo.com" domain was registered on January 18, 1995.

Yahoo was incorporated on March 2, 1995. In 1995, a search engine function, called Yahoo Search, was introduced. This allowed users to search Yahoo Directory. Yahoo soon became the first popular online directory and search engine on the World Wide Web.

=== Expansion and the dot-com bubble ===
Map showing localized versions of Yahoo web portals, as of 2023

Throughout the 1990s, Yahoo grew rapidly and became a public company via an initial public offering in April 1996 and its stock price rose 600% within two years. Like many search engines and web directories, Yahoo added a web portal, pitching itself against Excite, Lycos, and America Online. By 1998, Yahoo was the most popular starting point for web users, and the human-edited Yahoo Directory the most popular search engine, receiving 95 million page views per day, triple that of rival Excite. It also made many high-profile acquisitions. Yahoo began offering free e-mail from October 1997 after the acquisition of RocketMail, which was then renamed Yahoo Mail. In 1998, Yahoo replaced AltaVista as the crawler-based search engine underlying the Directory with Inktomi. Yahoo's two biggest acquisitions were made in 1999: Geocities for $3.6 billion and Broadcast.com for $5.7 billion.

Its stock price skyrocketed during the dot-com bubble, closing at an all-time high of $118.75 per share on January 3, 2000 and bottomed out at $8.11 on September 26, 2001.

=== Leadership ===
Yahoo's corporate direction was heavily influenced by a series of leadership changes and missed opportunities. The company had two failed attempts to acquire Google; in 1998, Larry Page and Sergey Brin approached Yahoo to sell their nascent search engine for $1 million, but Yahoo declined the offer. In 2002, CEO Terry Semel entered into negotiations to purchase Google for a reported $5 billion. After weeks of negotiation, Yahoo's final offer was $3 billion, a figure that Google's leadership rejected. The failure to acquire Google in this second instance is widely considered one of the largest strategic errors in corporate history.

In February 2008, Microsoft made an unsolicited bid to acquire Yahoo for $44.6 billion. Yahoo rejected the bid, claiming that it "substantially undervalues" the company and was not in the interest of its shareholders. Although Microsoft increased its bid to $47 billion, Yahoo insisted on another 10%+ increase to the offer and Microsoft cancelled the offer in May 2008.

The company subsequently cycled through several chief executives. Carol Bartz, formerly the CEO of Autodesk, replaced Yang as CEO in January 2009. After failing to meet performance targets, she was fired by chairman Roy J. Bostock in September 2011, and CFO Tim Morse was named as interim CEO. Following the appointment of Scott Thompson as CEO in April 2012, several key executives, including chief product officer Blake Irving, resigned. On April 4, Yahoo announced 2,000 layoffs, or about 14% of its 14,100 workers by the end of year, expected to save around $375 million annually. In an email sent to employees that April, Thompson reiterated his view that customers should come first and completely reorganized the company.

Thompson's tenure proved brief; he was fired on May 13, 2012, and replaced on an interim basis by Ross Levinsohn, who himself had recently been appointed head of Yahoo's new Media group. Several associates of Third Point Management, including Daniel S. Loeb, were also nominated to the board of directors. Thompson's total compensation for his 130-day tenure with Yahoo was at least $7.3 million. On July 15, 2012, Marissa Mayer was appointed president and CEO of Yahoo, effective July 17. Under Mayer's leadership, doubts about the company's turnaround emerged by January 2014 when she fired her own first major hire, Henrique de Castro.

=== Business ===
During the 2000s and 2010s, Yahoo continuously adapted its products and services to keep pace with shifting internet trends. Yahoo began using Google for search in June 2000, but over the next four years, it developed its own search technologies. It began using these in 2004, partly incorporating technology from its $280 million acquisition of Inktomi in 2002. In response to Google's Gmail, Yahoo began to offer unlimited email storage in 2007, though it struggled with competition and laid off hundreds of people in 2008.

The company's product strategy frequently experienced turbulence. In August 2010, Yahoo! Groups rolled out a major software change that was denounced by a vast majority of users, prompting vice president Jim Stoneham to announce on September 29 that the site would roll back the changes based on member feedback. Despite these setbacks, Yahoo achieved a brief traffic milestone in July 2013 when comScore data revealed that more people in the U.S. visited Yahoo websites than Google—the first time Yahoo had outperformed Google since 2011. This data did not count mobile usage or Tumblr, the blogging platform Yahoo had acquired in June 2013 for $1.1 billion in cash. Under the deal, Tumblr's CEO and founder David Karp continued to run the site. That same month, Yahoo announced plans to open a new office in San Francisco, and on August 2, it acquired Rockmelt, retaining its staff but terminating all of its existing products.

To bolster its media and advertising presence, Mayer hired Katie Couric to anchor a new online news operation and launched an online food magazine. Yahoo further expanded its advertising capabilities on November 21, 2014, with the acquisition of Cooliris, and on December 12, it acquired video advertising provider BrightRoll for $583 million. Yahoo's acquisition strategy continued into the 2020s, targeting modern technology and financial platforms. In August 2023, the company acquired the San Francisco-headquartered social investing platform Commonstock, and in April 2024, it acquired the AI-driven news aggregator app Artifact.

=== Strategic errors and security breaches ===
Yahoo's decline was punctuated by a series of strategic missteps and severe security incidents. In March 2004, the company launched a paid inclusion program that guaranteed commercial websites listings on the Yahoo! search engine in exchange for payment. While initially lucrative, the scheme proved highly unpopular with marketers who resisted the fees, and the public, who disliked that paid listings were indistinguishable from organic search results. By October 2006, Yahoo eased the program, ceasing to guarantee commercial listings and instead using paid inclusion only to crawl customer sites more frequently and provide search statistics. Security vulnerabilities also plagued the company; in January 2014, a large-scale malware attack dating back to December 30, 2013, was discovered by Fox IT in the Netherlands. Targeting Java, the attack delivered malware to 300,000 Yahoo! users per hour before it was stopped, heavily affecting users in Romania, France, and the UK. Yahoo! faced heavy criticism for failing to provide public guidance on the number of affected users or advice on remediation. These security issues culminated in the massive Yahoo data breaches, which later directly impacted the company's financial valuation.

=== Controversies under Mayer's leadership ===
Marissa Mayer's tenure as CEO became increasingly defined by internal controversy and deteriorating performance metrics. By December 2015, as the company's performance declined, Mayer faced intense scrutiny from the board regarding the future of Yahoo's core business. She was subsequently ranked as the least likable CEO in the tech industry. Product overhauls also alienated users; when Flickr unveiled a redesigned layout in May 2013—featuring one terabyte of free storage and a dynamically re-sized photo grid—Tech Radar noted it represented a "sea change" in the site's purpose, but the help forum was flooded with thousands of negative comments from critics who felt Yahoo had lost its mind.

Mayer's human resources policies and performance-rating systems drew severe legal challenges. In October 2016, Scott Ard, a prominent editorial director who had been fired in 2015, filed a lawsuit accusing Mayer of leading a sexist campaign to purge male employees. Ard, who had received "fully satisfactory" reviews since starting in 2011, alleged that Mayer encouraged the use of an employee performance-rating system to accommodate management's subjective biases against men. He claimed his role was eliminated as a pretext and given to a woman recently hired by editor-in-chief Megan Lieberman. As the lawsuit noted, Lieberman stated she was terminating Ard because she had not received a requested breakdown of his duties, despite him having already provided that exact information. A second sexual discrimination lawsuit was filed separately by Gregory Anderson, who had been fired in 2014, echoing claims that the performance management system was arbitrary and unfair. A California magistrate dismissed all the plaintiffs' claims except one: that Ard was passed over for promotion to editor-in-chief in favour of a woman prior to his dismissal. The judge found that "Anderson has not provided any evidence that his termination had anything to do with his gender".

Amid these internal crises and a $4.4 billion loss, Mayer announced layoffs amounting to 15% of the Yahoo workforce on February 2, 2016.

=== Sale to Verizon and Apollo ===
The mounting pressures and financial losses ultimately forced Yahoo to abandon its independence. On July 25, 2016, Verizon Communications announced it would acquire Yahoo's core Internet business for $4.83 billion, a stunning collapse from the company's peak valuation. The deal explicitly excluded Yahoo's 15% stake in Alibaba Group and its 35.5% stake in Yahoo Japan. However, the revelations regarding the data breaches forced a renegotiation; on February 21, 2017, Verizon lowered its purchase price by $350 million and reached an agreement to share liabilities related to the security failures.

Verizon completed the acquisition on June 13, 2017, marking the end of Yahoo as an independent company and prompting Mayer's resignation. Yahoo, AOL, and HuffPost were subsequently consolidated under a new umbrella subsidiary named Oath Inc. (later renamed Verizon Media), though the individual brands continued to operate under their own names. The remnants of the original Yahoo! Inc. that were not purchased by Verizon—primarily its stakes in Alibaba and Yahoo Japan—were spun off into a separate entity named Altaba, which was eventually liquidated after making a final distribution to shareholders in October 2020.

Yahoo's corporate identity changed hands again in September 2021, when investment funds managed by Apollo Global Management acquired 90% of the company from Verizon. Under Apollo's ownership, Yahoo continued to retract its global footprint; in November 2021, the company announced it was ending operations in mainland China due to an increasingly challenging business and legal environment. This followed the earlier discontinuation of China Yahoo Mail on August 20, 2013. In 2023, Yahoo announced a 20% reduction in its workforce – shedding roughly 1,000 of its 8,600 employees – joining a wave of mass layoffs sweeping the tech industry at companies including Google, Microsoft, and others.

== Products and services ==
For a list of all current and defunct services offered by Yahoo, see List of Yahoo-owned sites and services.

== Data breaches ==
The company reported two major data breaches of user account data to hackers during the second half of 2016. The first announced breach, reported in September 2016, had occurred sometime in late 2014, and affected over 500 million Yahoo! user accounts. A separate data breach, occurring earlier around August 2013, was reported in December 2016, and affected over 1 billion user accounts. Both breaches are considered the largest discovered in the history of the Internet. Specific details of material taken include names, email addresses, telephone numbers, encrypted or unencrypted security questions and answers, dates of birth, and encrypted passwords. Further, Yahoo! reported that the late 2014 breach likely used manufactured web cookies to falsify login credentials, allowing hackers to gain access to any account without a password.

On October 3, 2017, the company stated that all 3 billion of its user accounts were affected by the August 2013 theft.

== Criticism ==
In 2009, the Electronic Frontier Foundation criticized Yahoo for sending a DMCA takedown notice to whistleblower website Cryptome for posting details about obtaining private information from Yahoo subscribers. The company also censored private emails affiliated with Occupy Wall Street protests, apologizing and attributing the action to a mistake.

Additionally, Yahoo profited from partnerships with adware and spyware distributors whose pop-up advertisements appeared on users' computers, with a former employee stating in 2006 that the company adjusted ad frequency based on revenue needs.

Yahoo's cooperation with censorship in China drew severe criticism. The company provided user information to Chinese authorities that enabled the prosecution of journalists and dissidents, including Shi Tao, sentenced to ten years in prison in 2005 for sending censorship directives through a Yahoo email account, and Wang Xiaoning, arrested in 2002 after Yahoo assisted authorities by providing account information. In February 2006, Yahoo's General Counsel denied knowledge of these cases to Congress, but evidence surfaced in July 2007 showing Yahoo had received explicit government warrants requesting user data. In August 2007, human rights organizations sued Yahoo in San Francisco on behalf of Shi Tao and Wang Xiaoning. A U.S. congressional panel criticized Yahoo in November 2007 for providing incomplete testimony, characterizing the company as "at best inexcusably negligent" and at worst "deceptive."

Yahoo also faced criticism for the shuttering of multiple user-generated platforms. In June 2005, Yahoo’s user-created chatrooms were closed due to child safety concerns and insufficient ad revenue. Yahoo News message boards were closed in December 2006 due to trolling. In October 2008, Yahoo deleted millions of user profiles without notice or explanation. In 2009, Yahoo closed GeoCities when it was among the web's most-visited sites, deleting millions of user web pages.

== Partners and sponsorships ==
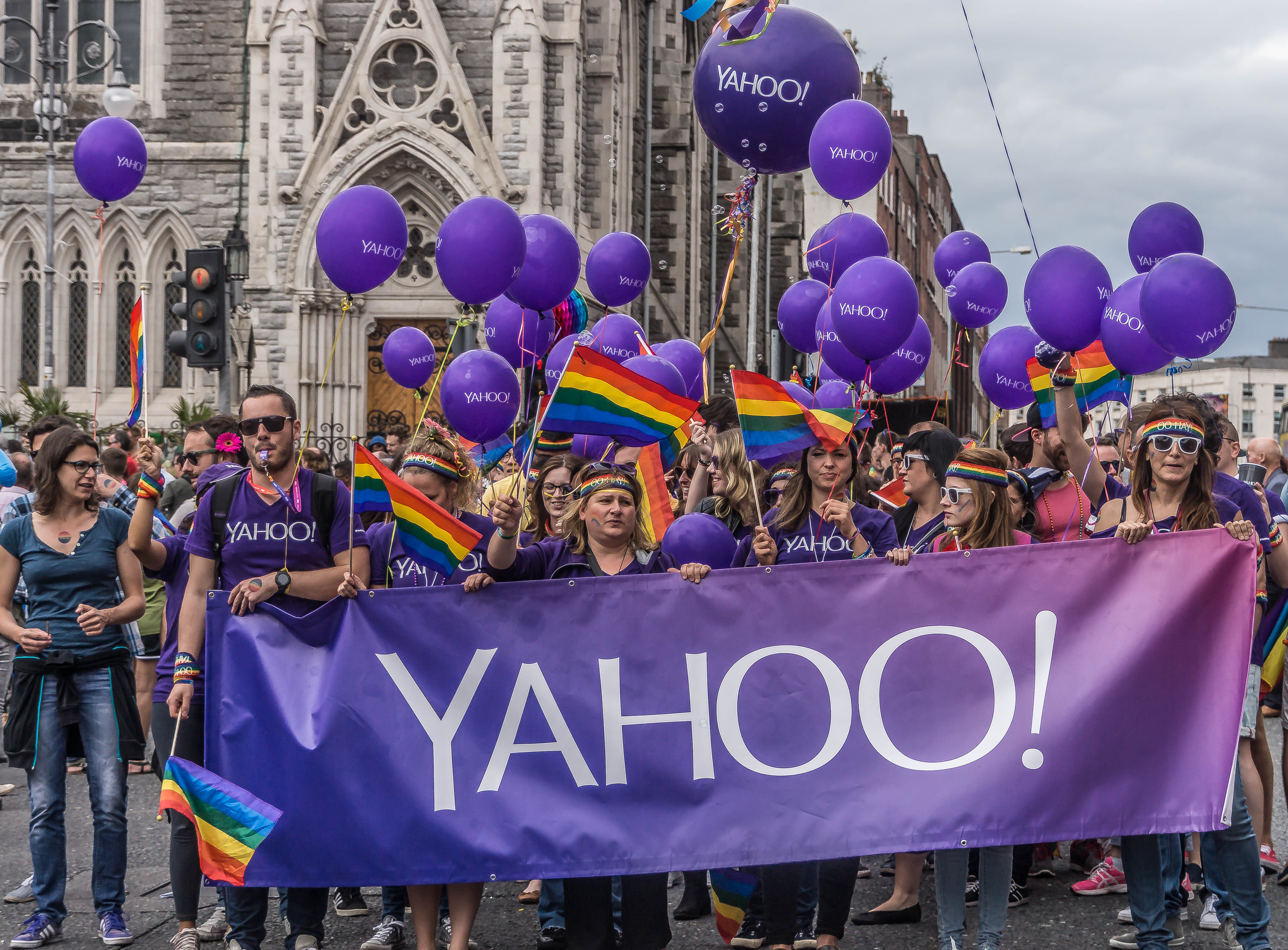
The 2015 Dublin LGBTQ Pride Festival, sponsored by Yahoo

On September 11, 2001, Yahoo announced its partnership with FIFA for the 2002 FIFA World Cup and 2006 FIFA World Cup tournaments. It was one of FIFA's 15 partners at the tournaments. The deal included co-branding the organization's websites.

Yahoo sponsored the 2012 Sundance Film Festival. NBC Sports Group aligned with Yahoo Sports the same year with content and program offerings on mobile and desktop platforms.

Yahoo announced television video partnerships in 2013 with Condé Nast, WWE, ABC NEWS, and CNBC. Yahoo entered into a 10-year collaboration in 2014, as a founding partner of Levi's Stadium, home of the San Francisco 49ers.

The National Basketball Association partnered with Yahoo Sports to stream games, offer virtual and augmented-reality fan experiences, and in 2018 NBA League Pass. Yahoo Sportsbook launched in November 2019, a collaboration with BetMGM.

BuzzFeed acquired HuffPost from Yahoo in November 2020, in a stock deal with Yahoo as a minority shareholder. The NFL partnered with Yahoo in 2020, to introduce a new "Watch Together" function on the Yahoo Sports app for interactive co-viewing through a synchronized livestream of local and primetime NFL games. The Paley Center for Media collaborated with Verizon Media to exclusively stream programs on Yahoo platforms beginning in 2020.

Yahoo became the main sponsor for the Pramac Racing team and the first title sponsor for the 2021 ESport/MotoGP Championship season. Yahoo, the official partner for the September 2021 New York Fashion Week event also unveiled sponsorship for the Rebecca Minkoff collection via a NFT space. In September 2021, it was announced that Yahoo partnered with Shopify, connecting the e-commerce merchants on Yahoo Finance, AOL and elsewhere.

== See also ==
- List of Yahoo-owned sites and services
- List of search engines
- Yahoo litigation
