= David Filo =

American businessman (born 1966)

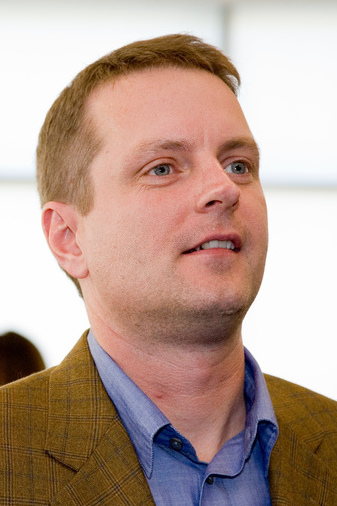
- Filo in 2007
- Born: David Robert Filo; April 20, 1966 (age 59); Wisconsin, U.S.
- Education: Tulane University (BS); Stanford University (MS)
- Occupations: Co-founder and Chief Yahoo, Yahoo! Inc.
- Spouse: Angela Buenning
- Children: 1

David Robert Filo (born April 20, 1966) is an American billionaire businessman and the co-founder of Yahoo! with classmate Jerry Yang. His Filo Server Program, written in the C programming language, was the server-side software used to dynamically serve variable web pages, called Filo Server Pages, on visits to early versions of the Yahoo! website.

== Early life and education ==
Filo was born in Wisconsin and was raised in Moss Bluff, Louisiana. He earned a B.S. degree in computer engineering at Tulane University (through the Dean's Honor Scholarship) and an M.S. degree in electrical engineering in 1990 at Stanford University.

== Career ==
In February 1994, he co-created with Jerry Yang an Internet website called "Jerry and David's Guide to the World Wide Web", consisting of a directory of other websites. It was renamed "Yahoo!" – a common exclamation.

Yahoo! became very popular, and Filo and Yang realized the business potential and co-founded Yahoo! Inc.

Yahoo! started off as a web portal with a web directory providing an extensive range of products and services for various online activities. Yahoo was one of the pioneers of the early Internet era in the 1990s. It is still one of the leading internet brands and, due to partnerships with telecommunications firms, is one of the most visited websites on the internet.

== Personal life ==
Filo is married to photographer and teacher Angela Buenning, a graduate of Stanford (1993) and Berkeley (1999). They have one child, and live in Palo Alto, California.

In 2005, he gave $30 million to his alma mater, Tulane University, for use in its School of Engineering.

The Filos have been major benefactors of both Stanford, especially its schools of sustainability and education, and Berkeley, primarily its graduate school of journalism.

As of September 2019, Forbes estimated Filo to be worth $4.3 billion, ranking him the 379th-richest person in the world.
