= Marissa Mayer =

American business executive and engineer, former CEO of Yahoo!

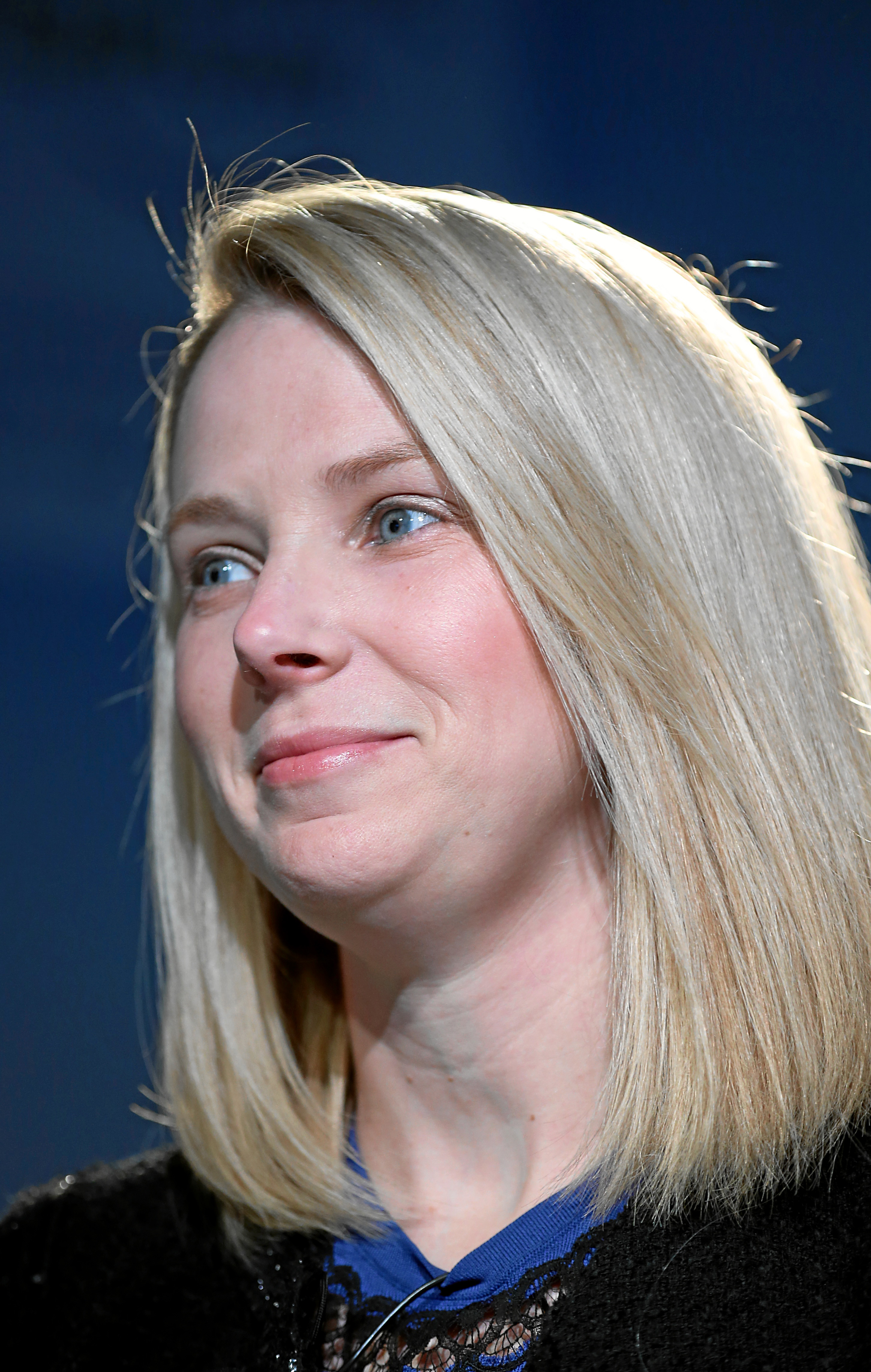
- Mayer in 2013
- Born: Marissa Ann Mayer; May 30, 1975 (age 51); Wausau, Wisconsin, U.S.
- Education: Stanford University (BS, MS)
- Occupations: Software engineer, business executive
- Title: Founder and CEO, Dazzle AI
- Board member of: AT&T Inc.; Hilton; San Francisco Ballet; Starbucks; Walmart
- Spouse: Zachary Bogue (m. 2009)
- Children: 3

Marissa Ann Mayer (/ˈmaɪ.ər/; born May 30, 1975) is an American business executive, software engineer, and investor who served as president and chief executive officer of Yahoo! from 2012 to 2017, when it was sold to Verizon. She was a long-time executive, usability leader and key spokesperson for Google (employee No. 20), and was its first woman software engineer. Mayer later co-founded Sunshine and, after its assets were acquired in 2025, founded the artificial intelligence company Dazzle AI.

== Early life ==
Mayer was born in Wausau, Wisconsin, the daughter of Margaret Mayer, an art teacher of Finnish descent, and Michael Mayer, an environmental engineer who worked for water companies. Her grandfather, Clem Mayer, had polio when he was seven and served as mayor of Jackson, Wisconsin, for 32 years. She has a younger brother. She would later describe herself as having been "painfully shy" as a child and teenager.

She "never had fewer than one after-school activity per day", participating in ballet, ice-skating, piano, swimming, debates, and the Brownies. During middle school and high school, she took piano and ballet lessons, the latter of which taught her "criticism and discipline, poise, and confidence". At an early age, she showed an interest in mathematics and science.

== Education ==
=== Wausau West High School ===
When she was attending Wausau West High School, Mayer excelled in chemistry, calculus, biology, and physics. She took part in extracurricular activities, becoming president of her high school's Spanish club, treasurer of the Key Club, captain of the debate team, and captain of the pom-pom squad.

Her high school debate team won the Wisconsin state championship and the pom-pom squad was the state runner-up. During high school, she worked as a grocery clerk. After graduating from high school in 1993, Mayer was selected by Tommy Thompson, then the Governor of Wisconsin, as one of the state's two delegates to attend the National Youth Science Camp in West Virginia.

=== Stanford University ===
Intending to become a pediatric neurosurgeon, Mayer took pre-med classes at Stanford University. She later switched her concentration to symbolic systems, a major which combined philosophy, cognitive psychology, linguistics, and computer science. At Stanford, she danced in the university ballet's Nutcracker, was a member of parliamentary debate, volunteered at children's hospitals, and helped bring computer science education to Bermuda's schools.

During her junior year, she taught a class in symbolic systems, with Eric S. Roberts as her supervisor. The class was so well received by students that Roberts asked Mayer to teach another class over the summer. She was awarded the Centennial Teaching Award and the Forsythe Award from Stanford.

Mayer went on to graduate with honors from Stanford with a BS in symbolic systems in 1997, and an MS in computer science in 1999. For both degrees, her specialization was in artificial intelligence. For her undergraduate thesis, she built travel-recommendation software that advised users in natural-sounding human language.

=== Other academic honors ===
In 2009, the Illinois Institute of Technology granted Mayer an honoris causa doctorate PhD degree in engineering in recognition of her work in the field of search.

Mayer interned at SRI International in Menlo Park, California, and Ubilab, UBS's research lab based in Zurich, Switzerland. She holds several patents in artificial intelligence and interface design.

== Career ==
=== Google (1999–2012) ===
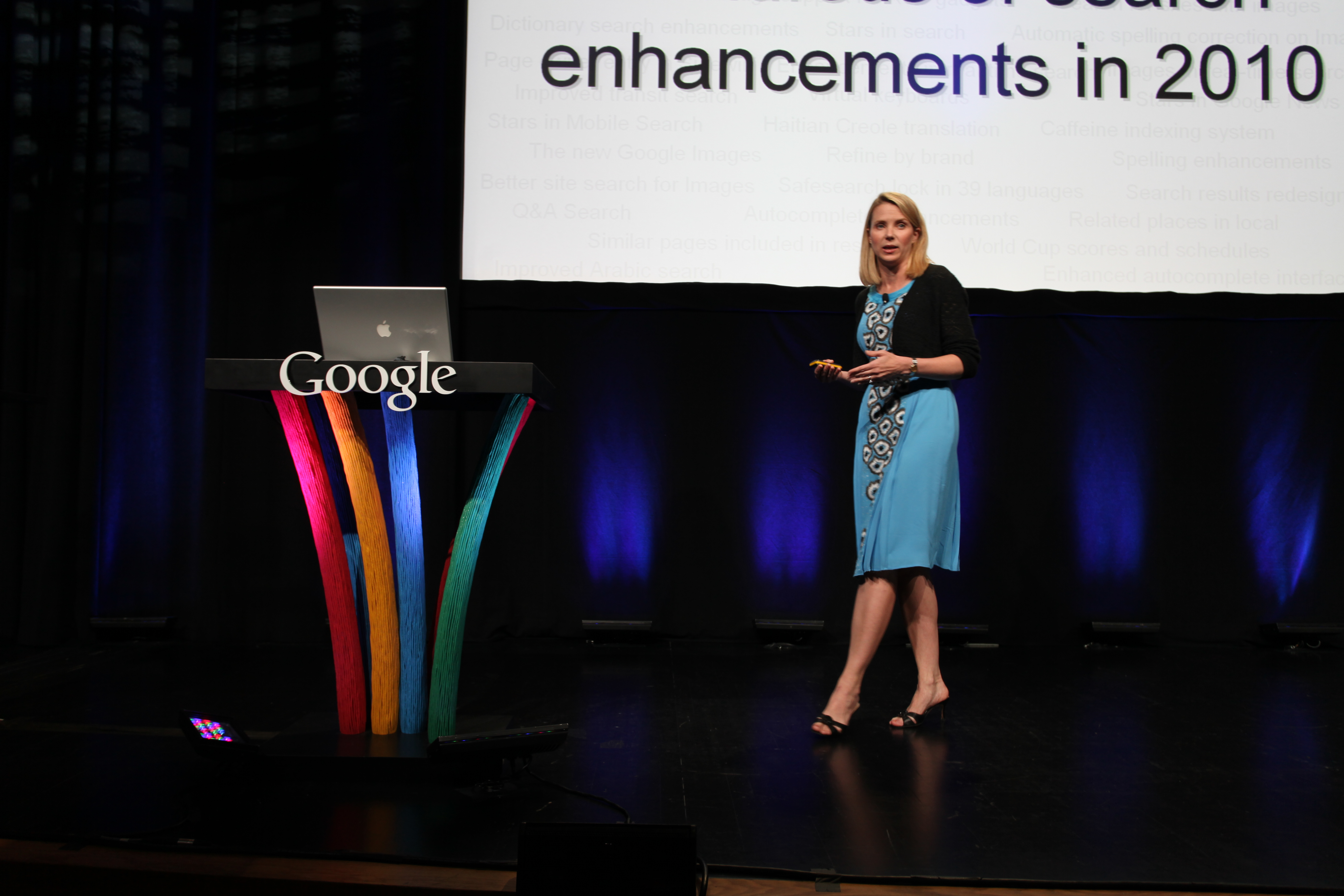
Marissa Mayer speaking at the Google "Search On" event in 2010

After graduating from Stanford, Mayer received 14 job offers, including a teaching job at Carnegie Mellon University and a consulting job at McKinsey & Company. As part of her interview at Google, she was quizzed by Google co-founder Sergey Brin on topics like artificial intelligence and user-friendly web design. She joined Google in 1999 as employee number 20, and was its first woman software engineer. She started out writing code and overseeing small teams of engineers, developing and designing Google's search offerings.

Although she was primarily a software engineer, she began to work on user interface design at the company. She became known for her attention to detail, which helped land her a promotion to product manager, and later she became director of consumer web products. She oversaw the layout of Google's well-known, unadorned search homepage. Mayer stated that she felt many of the other search engines were overloaded and that Google needed to reduce clutter to improve usability. She was also on the three-person team responsible for Google AdWords, which is an advertising platform that allows businesses to show their product to relevant potential customers based on their search terms. AdWords helped deliver 96% of the company's revenue in the first quarter of 2011.

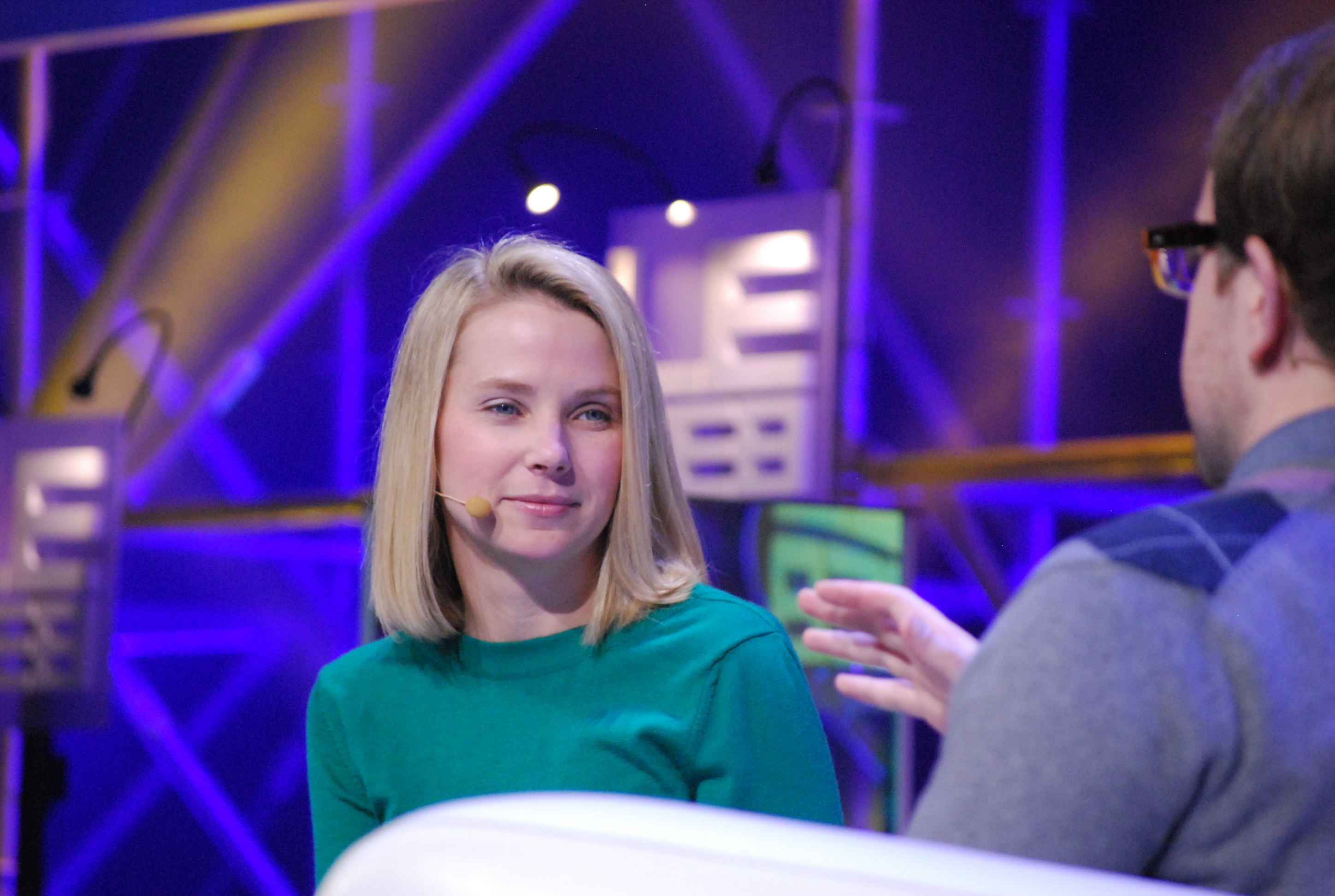
Marissa Mayer at an interview while working for Google in 2011

In 2002, Mayer started the Associate Product Manager (APM) program, a Google mentorship initiative to recruit new talents and cultivate them for leadership roles. Each year, Mayer selected a number of junior employees for the two-year program, where they took on extracurricular assignments and intensive evening classes. Notable graduates of the program include Bret Taylor and Justin Rosenstein. In 2005, Mayer became vice president of search products and user experience. Mayer held key roles in the development of Google Search, Google Images, Google News, Google Maps, Google Books, Google Product Search, Google Toolbar, iGoogle, and Gmail.

Mayer was the vice president of Google search products and user experience until the end of 2010, when she was asked by then-CEO Eric Schmidt to head the local, maps, and location services. Mayer's new position was widely viewed as a demotion. That year, Schmidt promoted her to Google's operating committee, making her the youngest member of the committee at the time. In 2011, she secured Google's acquisition of survey site Zagat for $125 million. While Mayer was working at Google, she taught introductory computer programming at Stanford and mentored students at the East Palo Alto Charter School.

=== Yahoo! (2012–2017) ===
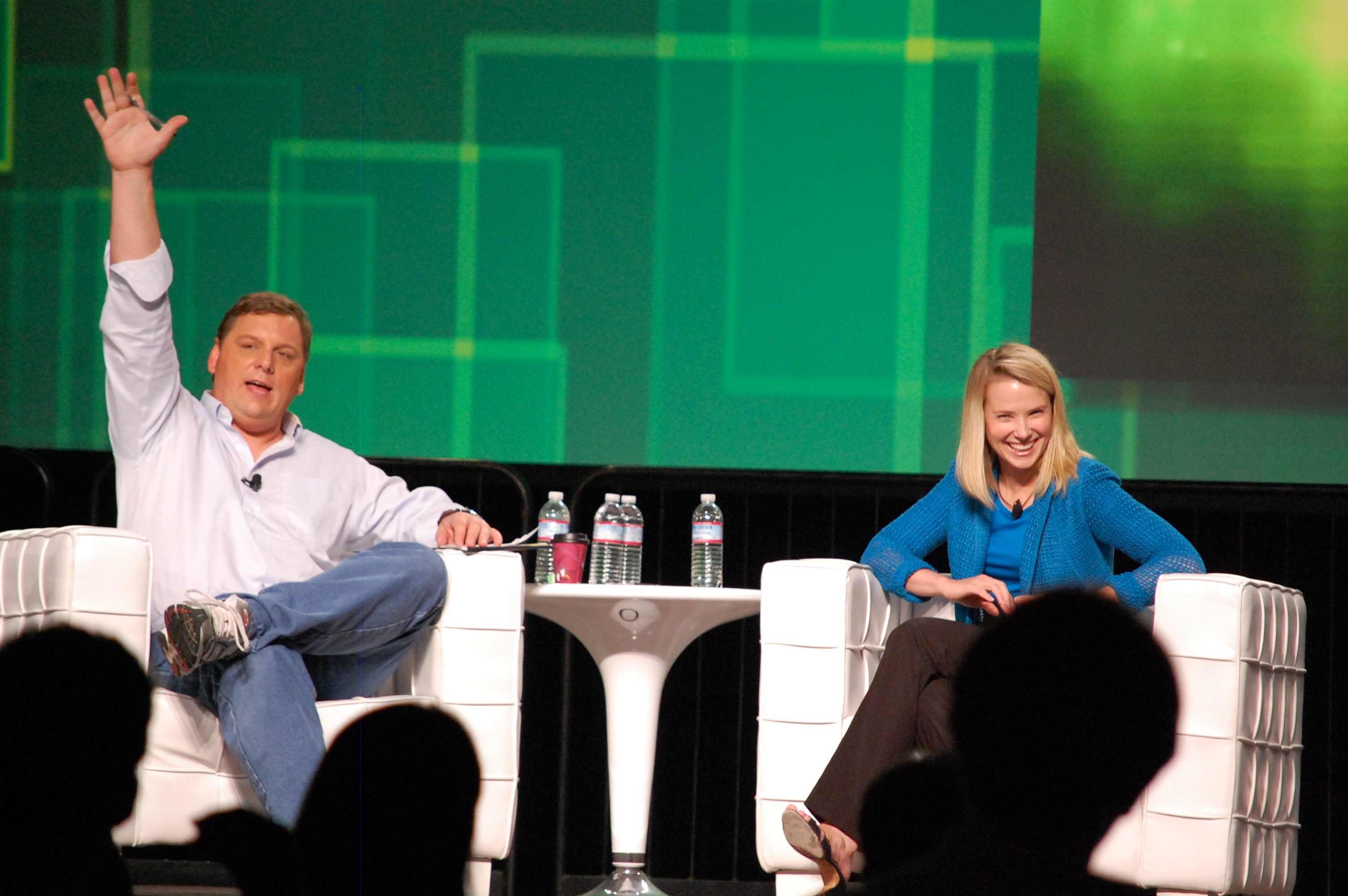
Michael Arrington and Marissa Mayer at TechCrunch Disrupt

On July 16, 2012, Mayer was appointed president and CEO of Yahoo!, effective the following day. She was already a member of the company's board of directors. At the time of her appointment, Yahoo's financials had been falling behind those of Google for over a year and was experiencing a high rate of turnover among CEOs, management and high-level engineers. To simplify the bureaucratic process, Mayer launched an online program called PB&J to collect employee complaints and votes on problems in the office; a problem that generated at least 50 votes would trigger an investigation by online management. Some of Mayer's management policies were criticized by The New York Times and The New Yorker.

In February 2013, Mayer oversaw a major personnel policy change at Yahoo! that required all remote-working employees to convert to in-office roles. Having worked from home toward the end of her pregnancy, and soundproofed a small space adjacent her office so that she could bring her infant son to work with her. She was consequently criticized for the ban on remote work. In April 2013, Mayer changed Yahoo!'s maternity leave policy, lengthening its time allowance and providing a cash bonus to parents. CNN noted this was in line with other Silicon Valley companies, such as Facebook and Google.

On May 20, 2013, Mayer led Yahoo! to acquire Tumblr in a $1.1 billion acquisition. In July 2013, Yahoo! reported a fall in revenues, but a rise in profits compared with the same period in the previous year. Yahoo!'s monthly web traffic surpassed that of Google in August 2013, although the companies continued to trend closely over the year. In September 2013, it was reported that the stock price of Yahoo! had doubled over the 14 months since Mayer's appointment. However, much of this growth may be attributed to Yahoo!'s stake in the Chinese e-commerce company Alibaba Group, which was acquired before Mayer's tenure. By 2016, the value of Tumblr had fallen by $230 million.

In November 2013, Mayer instituted a performance review system based on a bell curve ranking of employees, suggesting that managers rank their employees on a bell curve, with those at the low end being fired. Employees complained that some managers were viewing the process as mandatory.

In 2015, former Yahoo! editorial director Scott Ard filed a lawsuit alleging that the performance rating system was unfairly biased against male employees and resulted in his unfair firing. This case was dismissed in March 2018. In 2016, former Yahoo! employee Gregory Anderson filed a lawsuit alleging that the company’s performance management system disguised layoffs as terminations for the purpose of evading state and federal WARN Acts. Anderson's suit was dismissed in 2017.

In December 2015, Yahoo stakeholders SpringOwl and Starboard Value released statements criticizing Mayer's performance as CEO and recommending that she be replaced as CEO. By January 2016, it was further estimated that Yahoo!'s core business has been worth a negative value since December 2015. In February 2016, Mayer confirmed that Yahoo! was considering the possibility of selling its core business. In March 2017, it was reported that Mayer could receive a $23 million termination package upon the sale of Yahoo! to Verizon.

In 2017, the company's operating business was acquired by Verizon Communications for $4.48 billion. It was reported that under her contract, Mayer could receive $23 million in severance upon the sale of Yahoo! Inc. to Verizon. She announced her resignation on June 13, 2017. During her time at Yahoo!, she was paid a total of $239 million, mainly in stock and stock options.

In June of 2017, she defended former Uber CEO Travis Kalanick's response to allegations of sexual misconduct at Uber, suggesting that he might have been unaware that the company's culture had become toxic. On November 8, 2017, along with several other present and former corporate CEOs, Mayer testified before the United States Senate Committee on Commerce, Science, and Transportation regarding major state-sponsored attacks on Yahoo's data during 2013 and 2014.

=== 2018 – present: Sunshine, artificial intelligence ===
After leaving Yahoo! in 2017, Mayer started Lumi Labs with former colleague Enrique Munoz Torres. The company is based in Palo Alto and is focused on artificial intelligence and consumer media. On November 18, 2020, Mayer announced that Lumi Labs would be rebranded as Sunshine at the same time as she announced its first product: Sunshine Contacts. Sunshine Contacts claims to improve users' iPhone contacts and Google contacts using intelligent algorithms, contact data, public sources, and more. In November 2024, Sunshine launched the Shine app, an artificial intelligence photo sharing platform. The app allows users to organize and share images, and plan events. Sunshine was shut down in September 2025, and its assets were transferred to her new AI company called Dazzle.

Mayer has described artificial intelligence as "potentially a renewable resource that can be very generative", describing the technology as "enlightening". At the 2024 Cerebral Valley AI Summit in San Francisco, Mayer discussed the potential for artificial intelligence to be used to create more robust advertisements in search results.

In September 2026, Mayer launched Dazzle, an AI assistant targeted towards working moms and women . Dazzle is trained on the user's images and builds a dossier on them. Mayer was slammed on social media, after announcing she used the AI assistant to come up with three unique things about her ten-year old daughter.

== Boards ==
Mayer serves on the boards of directors of AT&T Inc., Hilton, Starbucks, and Walmart. She served on the board of Nextdoor from May 2024 to June 2025 and previously served on the board of Maisonette. She also serves or has served on several non-profit boards, including the San Francisco Ballet, Cooper–Hewitt, National Design Museum, and New York City Ballet. She served on the Board of Trustees at the San Francisco Museum of Modern Art from 2013 to at least 2019.

== Business investments ==
Mayer actively invests in technology companies, including crowd-sourced design retailer Minted, live video platform Airtime.com, wireless power startup uBeam, online DIY community and e-commerce company Brit + Co., mobile payments processor Square, home décor site One Kings Lane, genetic testing company Natera, and nootropics and biohacking company HVMN.

== Accolades ==
Mayer was named to Fortune magazine's annual list of America's 50 Most Powerful Women in Business in 2008, 2009, 2010, 2011, 2012, 2013, and 2014 with ranks at 50, 44, 42, 38, 14, 8 and 16 respectively. In 2008, at age 33, she was the youngest woman ever listed.

Mayer was named one of Glamour's Women of the Year in 2009. She was listed in the Forbes List of the World's 100 Most Powerful Women in 2012, 2013 and 2014, with ranks of 20, 32 and 18 respectively.

In September 2013, Mayer became the first CEO of a Fortune 500 company to be featured in a Vogue magazine spread.

In 2013, she was also named in the Time 100, becoming the first woman listed as number one on Fortune magazine's annual list of the top 40 business stars under 40 years old. Mayer made Fortune magazine history in 2013, as the only person to feature in all three of its annual lists during the same year: Businessperson of the Year (No. 10), Most Powerful Women (at No. 8), and 40 Under 40 (No. 1) at the same time. In 2014, Mayer was ranked sixth on Fortune's 40 under 40 list, and was ranked the 16th most-powerful businesswoman in the world that year according to the same publication. In March 2016, Fortune then named Mayer as one of the world's most disappointing leaders.

On December 24, 2015, Mayer was listed by UK-based company Richtopia at number 14 in the list of 500 Most Influential CEOs.

Mayer appeared on the list of women CEOs of Fortune 500 companies in 2017

== Personal life ==
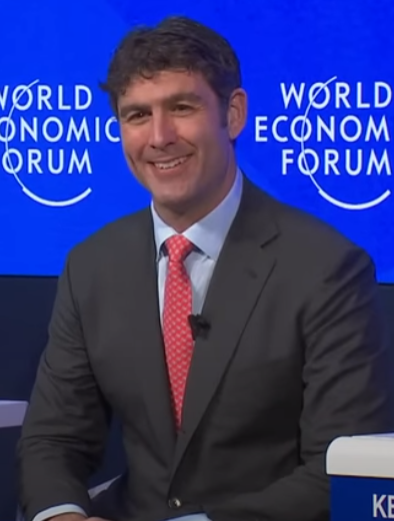
Zachary Bogue in 2023

Mayer dated Larry Page in the early 2000s while he was the CEO of Google. Mayer married lawyer and investor Zachary Bogue on December 12, 2009.

On the day Yahoo! announced her hiring, in July 2012, Mayer revealed that she was pregnant; she gave birth to a boy on September 30, 2012. Although she asked for baby name suggestions via social media, she eventually chose the name Macallister from an existing list. On December 10, 2015, Mayer announced that she had given birth to identical twin girls, Marielle and Sylvana.

Mayer is Lutheran, but she has said—referencing Vince Lombardi's "Your God, your family and the Green Bay Packers"—that her priorities are "God, family and Yahoo!, except I'm not that religious, so it's really family and Yahoo!".

Mayer states she is not a feminist.

As of November 2025, Mayer had an estimated net worth of $1.3 billion.

=== Political activity ===
During the 2021 California gubernatorial recall election, Mayer donated $200,000 to oppose an effort to recall Governor Gavin Newsom. This was described by Politico as "deepening the governor’s substantial Silicon Valley support".

Business positions
Preceded by Ross Levinsohn; Acting	Chief Executive Officer of Yahoo! 2012–2017	Vacant folded into Oath inc. Title next held by Jim Lanzone
