= Ferry Unardi =

Indonesian software engineer

- Born: January 16, 1988 (age 38); Padang, Indonesia
- Education: Harvard Business School
- Alma mater: Purdue University
- Occupations: Software engineer, entrepreneur, business executive
- Years active: 2008-present
- Organization(s): Traveloka (CEO, Co-founder, Chairman)
- Board member of: Traveloka
- Awards: Satyalancana Wira Karya Award

Ferry Unardi (born January 16, 1988) is an Indonesian software engineer and business executive known as the founding CEO of Traveloka, an online travel agency and booking website. After working at Microsoft as a software engineer, in 2012 he co-founded Traveloka in Jakarta, later expanding the company into countries such as Thailand, Singapore, and the Philippines. By 2022, the company was the largest online travel agency in Southeast Asia. Unardi is a recipient of the Satyalancana Wira Karya Award from the President of Indonesia.

== Early life and education ==
Ferry Unardi was born in Padang, Indonesia on January 16, 1988. Growing up in Padang, he developed an interest in information technology in high school, in part through programming competitions. Graduating high school in 2004, he moved to the United States to attend Purdue University in West Lafayette, Indiana. After taking part in a number of coding competitions, he earned a Bachelor of Science degree in both computer science and mathematics in 2008. He moved to Seattle, Washington that year to serve as a software engineer for Microsoft Corporation, working at Microsoft Lync on "real-time media performance and reliability." While at Microsoft, he began considering a career in business. Interested in studying business in Southeast Asia, Tech in Asia writes that "on a whim, he decided to take a flight to China just to see what the market had to offer." He studied Mandarin and visited large e-commerce companies such as Alibaba, Ctrip, Taobao, and Qunar to see how they operated. In 2011, he resigned from Microsoft and began attending Harvard Business School in Boston, Massachusetts, starting work on a Master of Business Administration degree.

== Career ==
=== 2011 to 2016 ===
While studying in Boston and traveling to visit family in Indonesia, Unardi frequently encountered difficulties booking flights. Frustrated, he came upon the idea of creating an Indonesian travel website that would simplify the comparison of flight details. Unardi contacted two Indonesian friends from his time at Microsoft, Albert, who he'd met at Purdue, and Derianto Kusuma. Considering the market climate in Indonesia, the three decided to leave their jobs and studies to form a startup company in Indonesia together. With Unardi dropping out of Harvard Business School to serve as founding chairman and CEO, they co-founded Traveloka in early 2012 in Jakarta, Indonesia. The Traveloka website went public in October 2012, and at the time, served only as an aggregator and search engine for flights.

Indonesia experienced a travel business boom in 2013, with Traveloka becoming an online travel agency (OTA). In 2013, Traveloka began letting users purchase flights as well as search for them and hotel bookings were added in 2014. As Traveloka CEO, Unardi spoke at the 2014 Startup Asia Jakarta event. Also in 2015, the Indonesian Ministry of Communication and several Indonesian startup founders including Unardi visited Silicon Valley to meet with investors. By 2016, Unardi had traveled with Indonesian President Joko Widodo on a number of international visits to "promote Indonesia's startup scene." In 2016, Unardi received the Satyalancana Wira Karya Award from Widodo. Also in 2016 Forbes ranked him 27th in its "30 Under 30 Asia: Retail & E-Commerce" list.

=== 2017 to 2023 ===
With Unardi as CEO, Traveloka had expanded by 2017, opening offices in Thailand, Singapore, Malaysia, the Philippines and Vietnam. Expedia Inc invested $350 million in the company in 2017, with Traveloka valued at over $1 billion and considered a unicorn company. Later in 2017, Unardi was one of five startup founders included in the inaugural Next Indonesia Unicorn International Summit (NextICorn), where the Indonesian Ministry of Communication again introduced various entrepreneurs to investors in Silicon Valley. Unardi spoke at the subsequent NextICorn in Nusa Dua, Bali in 2018, and also at the 2018 launch of EV Growth at the Djakarta Theater. Unardi received the 2018 ASEAN Entrepreneur Award. Also in 2018, Tech in Asia included him in a list of Southeast Asia's top 30 tech founders.

He spoke on Bloomberg Daybreak at Bloomberg's New Economy Forum in Beijing in 2019. During the early months of the coronavirus pandemic in 2020, Traveloka had surges in refund and rescheduling requests, and Traveloka began booking COVID-19 vaccination appointments. In 2021, Tatler Asia included him on a list of Asia's Most Influential. Under Unardi, by 2022, Traveloka had expanded beyond travel bookings to also sell lifestyle products and services such as attraction tickets, activities, transportation rentals, restaurant vouchers, credit and insurance.

== Personal life ==
In 2012, Unardi moved from where he was studying in the United States to Jakarta, Indonesia.
