= Gogobot =

Online travel service

Gogobot (a.k.a. Trip.com)
- Company type: Private
- Website type: Travel application
- Headquarters: Palo Alto, California, United States
- Area served: International
- Key people: Travis Katz, co-founder and CEO; Ori Zaltzman, co-founder and CTO
- Industry: Travel services
- Services: Social travel planning and business review/rankings
- Website: www.trip.com
- Launched: November 1, 2010; 16 years ago
- Current status: Acquired by Trip.com Group

Gogobot (later rebranded Trip.com) was an online travel business headquartered in Palo Alto, California. The company was rebranded Trip.com in November 2016 and acquired by the Ctrip Group in 2017. Founded in 2010, by Travis Katz and Ori Zaltzman, by 2014 the company was the fifth most visited travel-planning site in the United States.

The platform employed artificial intelligence to allow users to research and book destinations and places to go, including hotels, restaurants, bars and attractions in more than 60,000 destinations, and its community of users could share reviews and pictures from their own travel experiences. Forbes referred to the company as a "social network for travelers."

In 2019, following the acquisition by CTrip, CTrip subsidiary Skyscanner merged the company's content and technology into its platform, branding it the “Explore” section of the Skyscanner application.

== Description ==
Gogobot was a travel-planning and local discovery service that is available both on the web, and via iOS and Android applications. It allowed users to research and book hotels, restaurants, and activities at destinations around the world, reading reviews from its community of travelers and browsing photos. The company was an early pioneer in applying artificial intelligence to travel, leveraging data from a user's location, preselected interests, local weather, past behavior and more to predict places a user may be interested in visiting. In addition to social data, Gogobot allowed users to self identify with more than 19 "Tribes" (e.g. Foodies, Family Travelers, Nightlife lovers) allowing users to "cut through the noise" to see reviews and opinions from people with similar tastes and interests. As part of the planning aspect of the application, users could plan out itineraries, organizing them day by day and syncing them to multiple devices.

In September 2014, the platform debuted a feature called "Gogo This Week" which showcases handpicked events happening that week in large destination cities including Silicon Valley, San Francisco, Los Angeles, San Diego, New York City, and London. The application was available online as well as on iOS and Android devices.

== Company history ==
Gogobot was founded in 2010 by Travis Katz and Ori Zaltzman. Travis Katz had previously served as the senior vice president and GM, International for social media site MySpace, and Ori Zaltzman was the lead architect for Yahoo! Search BOSS and lead technologist at Yahoo! Answers. Katz came up with the idea for an online planning tool while working at MySpace, citing personal frustration with how long it took to make travel plans online, while noting that the larger online trip planning sites lacked "personal relevance."

The company secured $4 million in its first round of venture funding from Battery Ventures in July 2010. The website launched in November 2010. The same year that the website was launched, it was awarded a Crunchie award for best design by TechCrunch, beating AirBnB and About.me. The iOS application was released in October 2011.

In 2011, the platform announced several integrations with companies including Flipboard, Facebook, and Foursquare that would allow users to connect to their friends and other users through aspects of other social media platforms. In 2011, the platform was included in a list of 50 Best Websites by Time magazine. In October, 2011, the company raised an additional $15 million in venture capital in a series B round of funding led by Redpoint Ventures.

By 2012, the company's base of active users had grown to over two million members. After identifying that almost 44 percent of the site's users were coming from Europe, the company established a European headquarters in London in April 2012.

The Android application was released in January 2013. Later that year, the company announced a partnership with HomeAway, a vacation rental company. The partnership led to the launch of "Insider Guides," on the HomeAway website and mobile apps allowing HomeAway's property managers and hosts to create personalized guides for their guests, highlighting the best things to see or do near their property. The content and reviews these hosts created would live on both Gogobot and HomeAway sites (including HomeAway and VRBO). The company became the fastest growing travel website in 2013 achieving 3.7 million users.

In 2014, the site had more than 720,000 original reviews of hotels, attractions and restaurants, and 4 million photos. The company launched a redesigned mobile app in 2014 in response to users increasingly using the service for local discovery, rather than simply travel planning. The new site design also included a revamped company logo and a new “Tribes” feature that helps users filter places based on what is popular among people with similar interests such as foodies or adventure-seekers. In November 2014, the company secured $20 million in venture capital financing, led by HomeAway with participation from Redpoint Ventures and Battery Ventures.

In 2016, the company acquired the Trip.com brand from Expedia and the business was rebranded from Gogobot to Trip.com. The same year, the company launched a partnership with Hostelworld to give Hostelworld's customers access, in-app, to Gogobot's City Guides.

In 2017, the company was acquired by Ctrip Group. At the time of the acquisition, CTrip indicated the company had 60 million users. The price of the acquisition was not disclosed. Trip.com, became the flagship brand for CTrip, which renamed the holding company the Trip.com Group. In 2019, the platform was merged into Skyscanner.
