= Victoria Villasana =

Mexican textile and street artist

Victoria Villasana (b. Guadalajara, Jalisco, Mexico) is a Mexican mixed-media artist, combining embroidery, photography, collage, and painting.

== About ==
Her work explores themes of identity, feminism, migration, memory, and cross-cultural connections through textile interventions on photographic imagery. She is particularly recognized for her use of colorful threads extending beyond the frame, creating an intentionally unfinished aesthetic.

== Early Life & Education ==
Villasana was born in Guadalajara, Mexico. She studied design at the Instituto Tecnológico y de Estudios Superiores de Occidente (ITESO). Following her studies, she moved to London, where she worked in floral design and fashion before developing her artistic practice. During this period, she began creating embroidered photographic collages and installing them in public spaces throughout London.

== Career ==
Villasana first gained recognition through street interventions in London, where she attached embroidered portraits to telephone booths, post boxes, and urban surfaces. Her work attracted attention for its fusion of traditional textile techniques with contemporary urban art practices. The Guardian later featured her embroidered portraits of cultural figures and historical personalities.

Her practice subsequently expanded into gallery exhibitions, editorial commissions, and collaborations with international institutions and brands. Villasana has created works for organizations and companies including The New Yorker, History Channel, Nike, Golden Goose, Hulu, Time Magazine, The New York Times, Netflix and The Academy Awards.

In 2021, she was selected as one of seven international artists commissioned to create campaign artwork for the 93rd Academy Awards (Oscars). Her contribution combined textile imagery with symbolic references to transformation, multiculturalism, and cinematic storytelling. The project received international media coverage and increased her visibility in Mexico and abroad.

== Artistic Practice ==
Villasana's work combines embroidery, photography, painting, collage, and installation. Her practice often addresses themes of resilience, belonging, female empowerment, and the human capacity for transformation. She has stated that embroidery functions as a means of creating connections between cultures and generations.

A defining characteristic of her work is the presence of long, uncut threads extending beyond the image plane. This unfinished quality has been interpreted as representing impermanence, personal evolution, and acceptance of change. Her works frequently portray cultural icons, writers, activists, musicians, and overlooked historical figures.

Art publications such as My Modern Met, Colossal, Cultura Inquieta, and The Culture Trip have highlighted her reinterpretation of portraiture through textiles and her use of embroidery as a contemporary artistic medium.

== Themes & Influences ==
Throughout her career, Villasana has explored ideas surrounding cultural hybridity, historical memory, migration, and the visibility of marginalized communities. Her work frequently seeks to humanize historical narratives through color, textile, and storytelling, while also challenging traditional distinctions between craft and fine art.

== Exhibitions ==
- Saatchi Gallery, London, United Kingdom (Altered States, 2017)
- Long Island Museum, New York, United States (SOMOS/WE ARE: Latinx Artists of Long Island, 2023)
- S16 Gallery, Montreal, Canada (52 Meets 514: From Mexico to Montreal, 2023)
- Museo de Arte Popular, Mexico City
- Museo Diablos Rojos, Mexico City
- United Nations Headquarters exhibitions and cultural collaborations.

== Selected Collaborations ==
- Academy of Motion Picture Arts and Sciences (93rd Oscars campaign)
- The New Yorker
- Netflix
- Nike
- Hulu
- Sephora
- Time Magazine
- The New York Times
- WaterAid
- History Channel
- Golden Goose

== Selected Art Pieces ==
- 93rd Oscar's Campaign
- Street Art in London, Los Angeles, Mexico
- Album Covers
- Victoria Villasana – The Art Teacher
