= Sun Jie =

Sun Jie may refer to:

- Sun Jie (footballer), Chinese professional footballer
- Sun Jie (rower), Chinese rower
- Jane Sun (born 1969/1970), Chinese businesswoman and CEO of Trip.com Grop
