= SIRCLO =

- Type: Private
- Industry: E-commerce technology
- Founded: 2013
- Founder: Brian Marshal
- Website: sirclo.com

SIRCLO is an Indonesian e-commerce technology company that launched its services in Indonesia in 2013. It initially developed tools for businesses to create their own e-commerce websites and later expanded into multichannel e-commerce management and e-commerce enablement services for brands and retailers.

== History ==
=== Early development ===
SIRCLO was initially established in Singapore in 2011, while PT Lingkar Niaga Solusindo, its Indonesian legal entity, was established in September 2013, when its services were launched in Indonesia.

The company's initial product was an e-commerce platform that provided website design and tools for businesses selling online. It was designed to help small and medium-sized businesses establish their own online stores. By 2015, SIRCLO had thousands of free-trial users and hundreds of paying users.

In 2014, SIRCLO received seed funding from East Ventures. The company initially pursued a software-as-a-service (SaaS) model in which businesses could create customizable online stores.

=== Business-model evolution ===
SIRCLO encountered difficulties persuading Indonesian small businesses to pay for standalone e-commerce software. Many sellers relied on social media and manual processes to receive orders and payments, while marketplaces such as Bukalapak, Tokopedia and Lazada provided alternative ways for businesses to establish an online presence.

The company subsequently shifted toward multichannel commerce. Around 2015 and 2016, SIRCLO developed software that allowed businesses to manage products across multiple online marketplaces, including Lazada, Tokopedia and Shopee.

SIRCLO later expanded into e-commerce enablement. Rather than only providing software, the company began handling online distribution for brands, including warehousing and fulfillment. By 2019, its clients included Levi's, L'Oréal and Danone in Indonesia.

SIRCLO continued to operate software products alongside its e-commerce-enablement business. SIRCLO Store provided software for creating online stores, while Connexi was used by brands to manage sales across multiple digital channels.

=== Early business challenges ===
SIRCLO's early growth involved financial and operational difficulties. In 2015, the company failed to secure new funding and was close to shutting down. It subsequently reduced its workforce by 40 percent and reached break-even by the end of the year.

By 2019, SIRCLO had shifted substantially from its original pure-SaaS model. It had raised US$5 million in Series A funding, while the average monthly gross merchandise value processed through its services during the first half of 2019 was about US$4 million.

=== Merger with ICUBE ===
In 2020, SIRCLO merged with ICUBE, an Indonesian agency providing e-commerce technology solutions to retail businesses. The merger brought together the two companies' technology capabilities and client bases and was intended to expand their ability to serve micro, small and medium-sized businesses as well as larger brands.

=== Orami acquisition ===
In April 2021, SIRCLO acquired Orami, an Indonesian e-commerce marketplace focused on parents and children, for an undisclosed amount.

The acquisition expanded SIRCLO's activities to include Orami's consumer-facing marketplace and online parenting community. Orami's platform served a market for parents and children alongside SIRCLO's e-commerce technology and services for brands and retailers.

According to iPrice data cited by The Jakarta Post, Orami was the sixth-most-visited e-commerce website in Indonesia during the fourth quarter of 2020 and ranked first among the Mom and Baby category websites.

Following the acquisition, Orami chief executive Ferry Tenka became SIRCLO's chief marketing officer, while Orami president Hendrawan Kartika became SIRCLO's chief financial officer.

SIRCLO recorded a fourfold increase in transactions during 2020 as consumer activity shifted toward online shopping during the COVID-19 pandemic. The company recorded positive net operating income by the end of 2020, while combined turnover reached Rp3.3 trillion.

=== Funding and expansion ===
In August 2020, SIRCLO closed a US$6 million funding round involving East Ventures, OCBC NISP Ventura, Skystar Capital and Sinar Mas Land. The funding was intended to strengthen the company's infrastructure as demand for e-commerce services increased.

In September 2021, SIRCLO raised US$36 million in a funding round led by East Ventures' growth fund and Saratoga, with participation from Traveloka and Sinar Mas Land among other investors. The funding was intended to support technology infrastructure and the expansion of SIRCLO's services to business owners.

The company planned to develop a dashboard providing real-time data analytics across multiple sales channels and a financing solution aimed at micro, small and medium-sized businesses.

=== Warung Pintar acquisition ===
In early 2022, SIRCLO acquired Warung Pintar, an Indonesian technology company focused on micro-retail businesses and warung.

The acquisition brought Warung Pintar into SIRCLO Group and expanded the company's activities into solutions connecting online and offline commerce for brands, distributors, businesses and consumers.

== Products and services ==
=== SIRCLO Store ===
SIRCLO Store was the company's original SaaS product for creating online stores. The service used customizable templates and was initially aimed at small and medium-sized businesses seeking to establish a direct online presence.

=== Multichannel commerce ===
SIRCLO expanded into multichannel commerce as Indonesian businesses increasingly sold products through multiple marketplaces. Its technology allowed businesses to manage product listings and sales across different online channels.

Connexi provided an interface for managing online sales across multiple storefronts, while SIRCLO's broader e-commerce-enablement services supported brands with online distribution and related operations.

=== E-commerce enablement ===
SIRCLO's e-commerce-enablement model included services beyond software, such as online distribution, warehousing and fulfillment. By 2019, the company was managing online sales for products from brands including Levi's, L'Oréal and Danone in Indonesia.

== Social commerce ==
SIRCLO later expanded its activities into social commerce as social-media platforms became additional channels for online retail.

In 2022, SIRCLO was described as an e-commerce-enabler agency helping retailers adapt to selling through TikTok, providing marketing, data analytics, shipping and fulfillment services. It also partnered with L'Oréal to support the beauty company's sales to Indonesian shoppers through TikTok.
