= InKind =

American restaurant financing technology company

inKind is an Austin-based company that helps provide financing and services to restaurants without charging interest or taking equity. Instead, InKind buy large blocks of food and beverage credit up front at a discount, and then it resells the credit to diners though a mobile app, where they receive perks in return.

As of 2025, the company said it had deployed over $350 million to over 3,000 restaurants in 167 cities in 44 states. By February 2026, inKind stated it had provided more than $600 million in funding to over 6,000 restaurants across the U.S.

Investors include Jay-Z's investment firm MarcyPen Capital Partners, Yahoo co-founder Jerry Yang, and all four members of the band Metallica.

== History ==
The company was launched in 2017 by brothers Johann and Rajan Moonesinghe, Andrew Harris, and Marcus Triest.

For years, the founders put in their own money while the company generated what has been described as “non-meaningful revenue.” The model took time to calibrate with missteps and trial and error.

In the company's early days Johann Moonesinghe and Harris, who are married, cashed out their home and retirement accounts to keep the company going.

Rajan Moonesinghe was killed by a police officer outside his home in 2022.

In 2024, inKind acquired high-end restaurant group, Etta Collective, out of bankruptcy for $4 million. InKind had been a creditor for Etta.

== Services ==
In addition to its original offerings, inKind now offers tech for restaurants, largely through a system called Sherlock that draws upon data from the restaurants. The system is used for labor management to schedule shifts more efficiently and monitoring restaurant margins.
