= Midas List =

Annual ranking of dealmakers in technology by Forbes magazine

The Forbes Midas list is the annual ranking by Forbes magazine of the most influential and best-performing venture capital investors. Described by Kara Swisher as the "Oscars for venture capitalists in tech," the Midas List uses parameters that include the first-day market capitalization of IPOs and the opinions of a panel of experts. It also includes a Midas Seed list for ranking seed stage investors.

The name alludes to the mythological King Midas, renowned for his ability to turn anything he touched into gold. Forbes partnered with venture capital fund TrueBridge Capital Partners to create the list.

== History ==
The inaugural Midas List was published in the February 19, 2001 issue of Forbes. The print issue featured the top 50 names while the full list of 100 names was posted exclusively online. Carleen Hawn was the editor of the list and five staffers were credited as producers.

== Midas List Top 10, 2026 ==
According to Forbes, the top 10 venture capitalists in 2026 are as follows:

Rank	Name	Firm	Notable Deal	Headquarters
1	Vinod Khosla	Khosla Ventures	OpenAI	Portola Valley, California
2	Neil Shen	HSG	ByteDance	Hong Kong, China
3	Eric Vishria	Benchmark Capital	Cerebras	Atherton, California
4	Gili Raanan	Cyberstarts	Wiz	Michmoret, Israel
5	Peter Thiel	Founders Fund	SpaceX	Los Angeles, California
6	Elad Gil	Gil Capital	OpenAI	San Francisco, California
8	Trae Stephens	Founders Fund	Anduril	San Francisco, California
8	Douglas Leone	Sequoia Capital	Wiz	Atherton, California
9	Martin Mignot	Index Ventures	Revolut	New York, New York
10	Shardul Shah	Index Ventures	Wiz	New York, New York
