= BTG Homeinns =

Chinese hotel chain

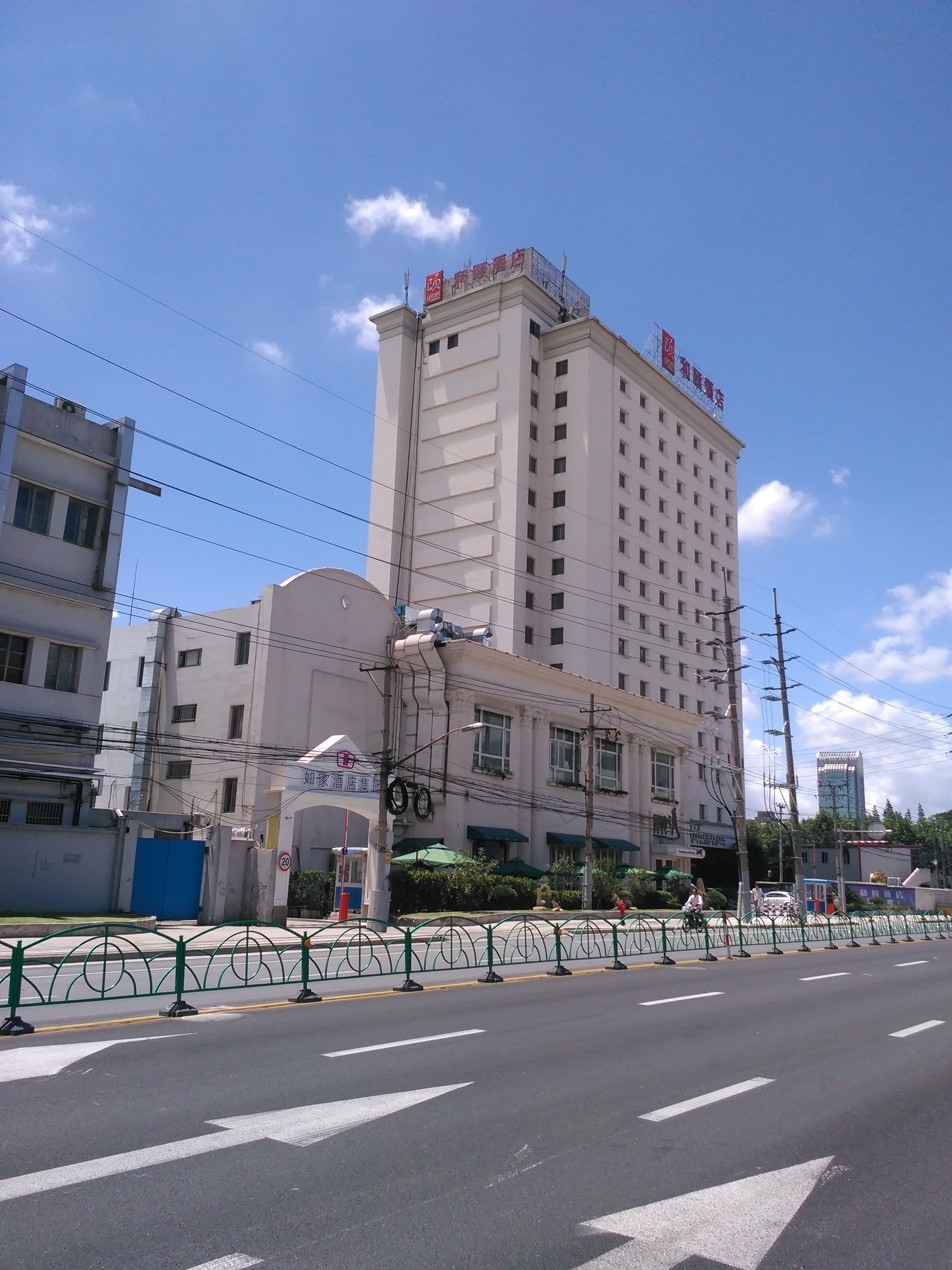
- Home Inn headquarters alongside a Yitel Hotel
- Type: Subsidiary
- Traded as: Nasdaq: HMIN
- Industry: Hotels
- Founded: 2002; 24 years ago, in Beijing, China
- Headquarters: 124 Caobao Road, Xuhui District, Shanghai, China
- Area served: China
- Parent: Beijing Tourism Group
- Website: bthhotels.com/en

Homeinns Hotel Group
- Simplified Chinese: 如家酒店集团
- Traditional Chinese: 如家酒店集團
- Literal meaning: Like Home Hotel Group
Transcriptions
Standard Mandarin
- Hanyu Pinyin: Rújiā Jiǔdiàn Jítuán

BTG Homeinns is a hotel chain in China. It is a part of BTH Hotels and its headquarters are in the Xuhui District, Shanghai.

== History ==
Ctrip.com co-founders, Neil Shen and Ji Qi co-founded the chain in 2001, and it began in 2002. Private equity funded the hotel chain. In October 2006 it was listed on Nasdaq in the United States. IDG Ventures invested in the company, causing it to raise $109 million U.S. dollars in its 2006 Nasdaq listing.

In 2007 Home Inn considered building hotels in Taiwan. In October 2007 Home Inn purchased Top Star, a hotel company that had been established two years prior. The transaction netted Home Inn an additional 26 hotels. As of 2008 the company had around 250 hotels, and Home Inn, Motel 168 and Jinjiang Inn together controlled 44% of China's budget hotel market. At that time the company planned to increase the number to 1,000 and to open outlet in other Asian countries. The chain acquired Motel 168 in October 2011.

In December 2015 BTG Hotels (of the Beijing Tourism Group) announce will acquire Home Inn chain for 11 billion renminbi (1.7 billion U.S. dollars).

In April 2016, Home Inn completed the Going Private Transaction and sold to BTG Hotels.

== Operations ==
Home Inn is the largest budget hotel chain in China, and it was the first budget chain that was established in China. Brands include Home Inn (Chinese: 如家酒店; pinyin: Rújiā Jiǔdiàn), Motel 168, Yitel (和颐酒店; Héyí Jiǔdiàn), and Fairyland Hotel (simplified Chinese: 云上四季连锁酒店; traditional Chinese: 雲上四季連鎖酒店; pinyin: Yúnshàng Sìjì Liánsuǒ Jiǔdiàn). Yitel is a business-oriented brand of Home Inn.
