= Terry Semel =

American corporate executive (born 1943)

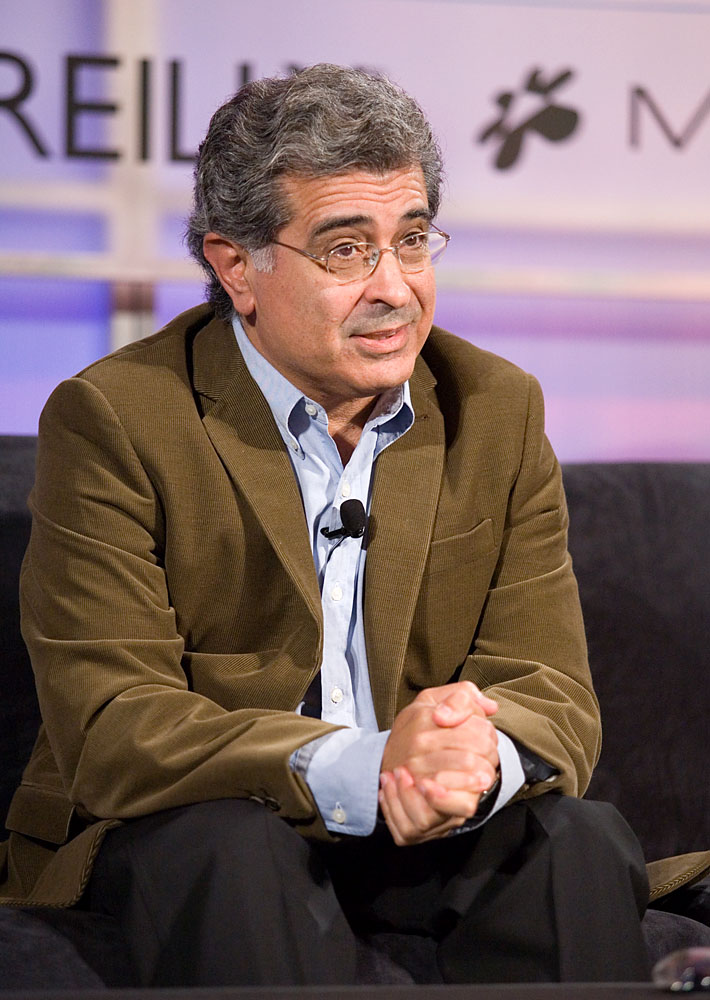
- Semel at the Web 2.0 Conference 2005
- Born: February 24, 1943 (age 83); Brooklyn, New York
- Education: Long Island University (B.S.)
- Spouse(s): Maryann Semel (divorced); Jane (Bovingdon) Semel (m. 1977 - present)
- Children: 4
- Parent(s): Mildred Wenig Semel; Ben Semel

Terence Steven Semel (born February 24, 1943) is an American corporate executive who was the chairman and CEO of Yahoo! Incorporated from 2001 to 2007. Previously, he spent 24 years at Warner Bros., where he served as chairman and co-chief executive officer.

== Early life ==
Semel was born to a Jewish family in Brooklyn, New York, the son of Mildred (née Wenig) and Ben Semel. His father was a women's coat designer and his mother was a bus company executive. He was raised in Bay Terrace, a community in Bayside, Queens. He was the middle child, and has two sisters. At the age of 23, he graduated from Long Island University in Brooklyn with a B.S. degree in accounting.

== Career ==
Semel began working at Warner Bros. in 1965 as a trainee. From 1970 to 1972, Semel worked for CBS corporation's theatrical film production company, Cinema Center Films, as domestic sales manager.

CBS closed Cinema Center Films in 1972 and Semel moved to Walt Disney Productions, where he was vice president in charge of theatrical distribution until 1975.

In 1975, Semel returned to Warner Bros. Distribution as president, then moved into studio operations as an executive vice president in 1979. Frank Wells announced he was taking a less active role the company in 1981, Semel became president and chief operating officer of Warner Bros. on January 1, 1982.

In 1994, Warner Bros. Chairman and Chief Executive Robert A. Daly announced that Semel would become his co-chairman and CEO. The following year, the two men also became co-chairmen and co-chief executives of Warner Music following the firing of Michael J. Fuchs.

Both Daly and Semel resigned from Warner Bros. in July 1999.

=== Yahoo ===
Terry Semel became the CEO of Yahoo! on May 1, 2001, and he served as CEO until June 18, 2007.

==== Compensation ====
In April 2001, Semel was granted stock options with an SEC Fair Value of over $110 million as a bonus to join Yahoo. In June 2006, his annual salary was reduced to one dollar.

==== Yahoo!–China cooperation controversy ====
As CEO, Semel approved Yahoo!'s cooperation with Chinese officials to release previously confidential Yahoo! information to the Chinese government. This action by Yahoo! was not well received and he showed signs of regret as to how that information was being used. For example, in a widely publicized exchange at The Wall Street Journal's All Things Digital conference, he was asked if Yahoo! would have cooperated with Nazi Germany. In response, Semel, who is Jewish, stated, "I don't know how I would have felt then." He added, "I don't feel good about what's happening in China today." When questioned on this topic in a Q & A discussion with Peter Bazalgette at The Royal Television Society Cambridge Convention in 2005, his response was "We have to abide by the laws in the countries in which we operate."

==== Interest in buying Google ====
After joining Yahoo, company founders Jerry Yang and David Filo suggested he look at buying Google, whose founders looked up to Yahoo's founders. Semel had dinner with Larry Page and Sergey Brin, asking them what their business was with Yahoo paying only $7 million annually as its biggest licensor of Google search technology. So Semel proposed to buy Google. They replied that they wanted $1 billion and didn't want to sell. Semel said he'd think about the price. After another dinner Semel agreed to the $1 billion. Page and Brin replied that they wanted $3 billion and didn't want to sell.

==== Interest in buying Facebook ====
Semel was given the mandate by Yahoo Board to buy Facebook for up to 1.2 billion dollars, Mark Zuckerberg having asked a price of one billion dollars. He tried to make it nonetheless for $850,000,000, and Zuckerberg stopped the negotiating process.

==== Resignation ====
Semel resigned as CEO due in part to pressure from shareholders' dissatisfaction over his compensation (in 2006, salary $1, stock options worth $70 million) and performance.

Semel ended his six-year tenure as chief executive officer on June 18, 2007, and handed over the reins to co-founder Jerry Yang in the Internet icon's latest attempt to regain investor confidence. At age 64, Semel remained chairman in a non-executive role. Besides naming Yang as its new CEO, Yahoo appointed Susan Decker as its president. Having recently been promoted to oversee Yahoo's advertising operations, Decker had widely been regarded as Semel's heir apparent. He later resigned from his post as non-executive chairman from Yahoo completely on January 31, 2008.

== Other activities ==
Semel is Co-Chair Emeritus of the board of trustees of the Los Angeles County Museum of Art (LACMA) In 2005, he was given the UCLA Medal, that University's highest honor, and the "Legend in Leadership Award" from the Chief Executive Leadership Institute of the Yale School of Management.

== Personal life ==
In 1966, he married Maryann Soloway; they divorced in 1974.

In 1977, he married Jane Bovingdon, a former secretary to the actress Susan George.

He has a son, Eric Scott Semel (b. March 15, 1969), and three daughters, Courtenay Semel (b. November 11, 1979), Lily Bovingdon Semel (b. 1985), and Kate Bovingdon Semel (b. March, 1992)..

In 2004, the UCLA Neuropsychiatric Institute was renamed the Jane & Terry Semel Institute for Neuroscience and Human Behavior.

Semel developed Alzheimer's disease, and began living in a nursing facility in 2016.

== See also ==
- One-dollar salary

Business positions
Preceded by Timothy Koogle	Chief Executive Officer of Yahoo! 2001–2007	Succeeded by Jerry Yang
