= Neil Shen =

Chinese Investor

- 沈南鹏
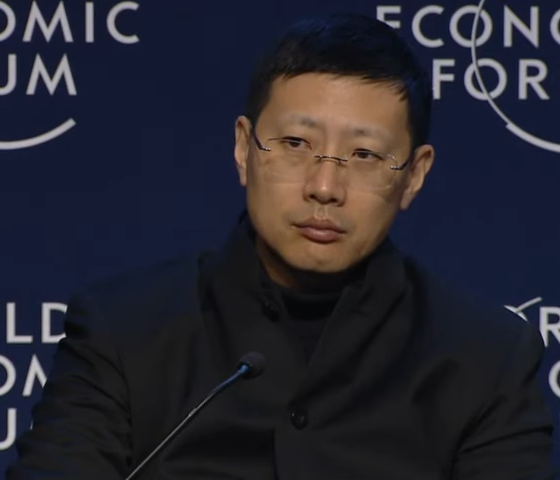
- Shen at World Economic Forum in 2014
- Born: 16 December 1967 (age 58); Haining, Jiaxing, Zhejiang, China
- Education: Shanghai Jiaotong University; Yale School of Management
- Occupations: Venture Capitalist; Entrepreneur
- Title: Co-founder of HSG; Co-founder of Ctrip.com; Co-founder of Home Inn
- Children: 2

Neil Shen (Chinese: 沈南鹏; pinyin: Shěn Nánpéng) is a Chinese billionaire venture capitalist and entrepreneur. He is the founding and managing partner of HSG, formerly Sequoia China, which became independent from Sequoia Capital in 2023. He previously co-founded Ctrip.com (now Trip.com Group) and Home Inn.

He is the most successful venture capital investor in China, according to Forbes and the Financial Times.

As of September 2025, Forbes estimated his net worth at $3.8 billion.

== Early life and education ==
Shen was born in Haining, Zhejiang, in 1967. He grew up in Shanghai and attended Shanghai No. 2 High School, where he was called a math prodigy. He then attended Shanghai Jiao Tong University, where he graduated in 1989 with a bachelor's degree in applied mathematics. Afterwards, he moved to the United States to attend Columbia University's math PhD program but left when after questioning whether he would make a mark as a mathematician. He then attended the Yale School of Management, graduating with a master's degree in management in 1992.

== Career ==
After graduation, Shen worked for Citibank in the United States for two years. In 1994, he moved to Hong Kong to work as an investment banker at Lehman Brothers. In 1996, he joined Deutsche Bank as director of China capital markets.

Shen left the banking sector, and in June 1999, co-founded Ctrip.com — later Trip.com Group — one of China's first online travel brands and booking sites, along with James Liang, Min Fan, and Qi Ji. Shen was president and CFO of Ctrip, and oversaw the company's initial public offering (IPO) on the Nasdaq in 2003.

In 2002, Shen co-founded Home Inn as a subsidiary of Ctrip; it went public as a separate company in 2006.

In 2005, Shen co-founded Sequoia China with Zhang Fan under the guidance of Sequoia Capital partners Michael Moritz and Douglas Leone. Shen was given full autonomy and led Sequoia China to make successful investments in companies including Alibaba, ByteDance, Meituan, JD.com, and Pinduoduo.

When managing partner Douglas Leone retired in 2022 from Sequoia Capital, Shen was considered one of the potential successors. However, the role went to Roelof Botha instead. Shen did not work as closely with the new leadership and had talked about going independent for years.

In June 2023, Sequoia Capital announced that its U.S., China, and India businesses would separate into three entities. Sequoia China, which Shen led, became an independent firm and rebranded as HSG. The firm continues to operate in China under its Chinese name, 红杉 (HongShan), which means 'redwood.'

Shen was ranked first on the Forbes Midas List, a global ranking of the best-performing venture capitalists in the world, in 2018,2019, 2020, and 2023.

== Personal life ==
Shen is married to an investment banker and has two daughters.

As of 2025, Shen lives in Hong Kong. He speaks Mandarin and English and also has some proficiency in Cantonese.

Shen is chairman of the Yale School of Management board of advisors.

In January 2018, Shen was elected to the 13th Chinese People's Political Consultative Conference. However, in January 2023, The Information reported that he was no longer a member as he was not elected for a second term.

In February 2024, the Financial Times reported that Shen had acquired permanent residency in Singapore.
