= Beijing Tourism Group =

Company based in Beijing

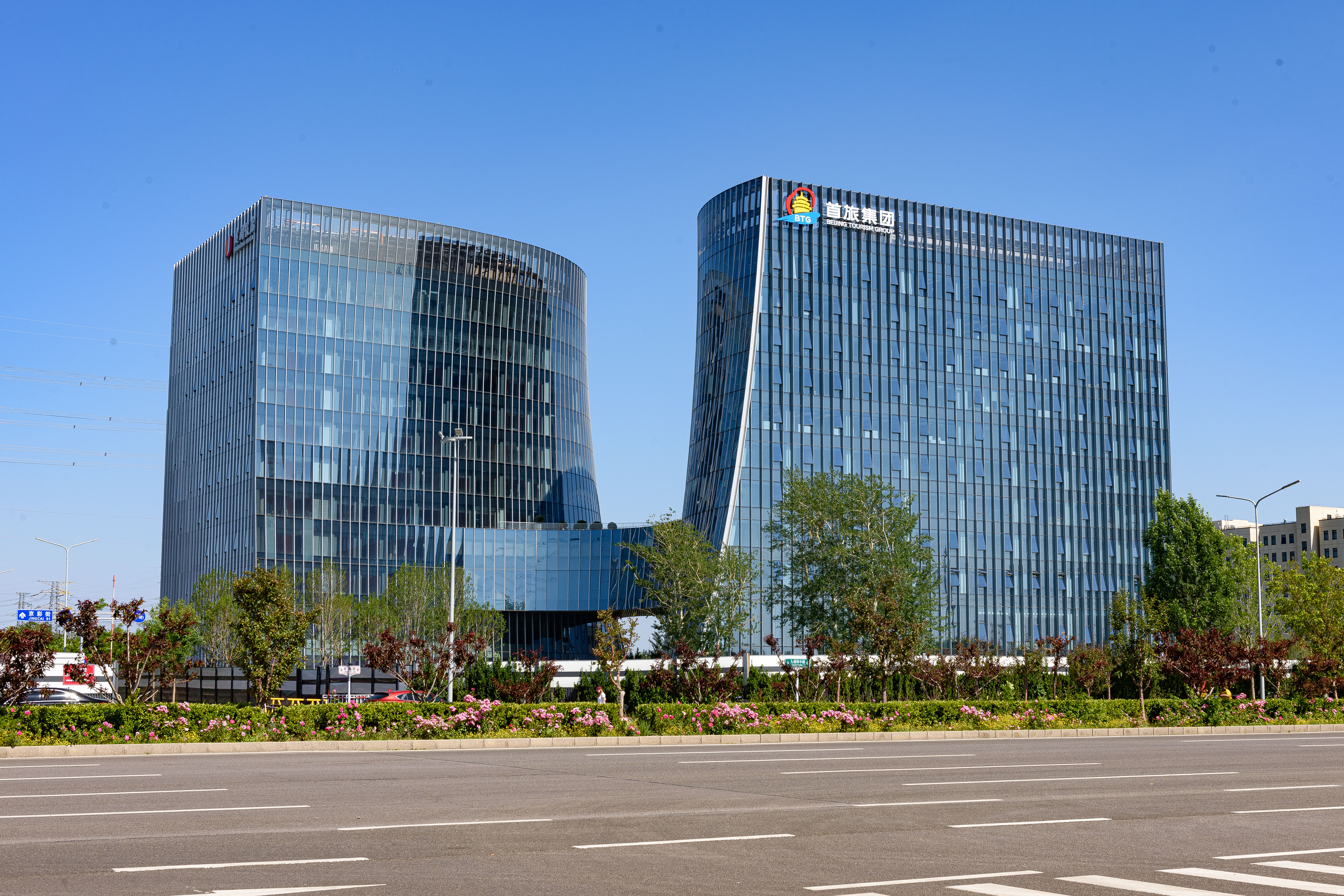
- BTG Headquarters in Wenjing Subdistrict, Tongzhou, Beijing
- Type: State-owned enterprise
- Industry: Tourism
- Founded: February 1998; 28 years ago in Beijing, China
- Website: www.btg.com.cn/en/

Beijing Tourism Group
- Simplified Chinese: 北京首旅集团
- Traditional Chinese: 北京首旅集團
Transcriptions
Standard Mandarin
- Hanyu Pinyin: Běijīng Shǒu Lǚ Jítuán

The Beijing Tourism Group (BTG; Chinese: 北京首旅集团) is a Chinese state-owned enterprise operating in various areas of tourism, including travel agencies, dining, hotels, shopping and entertainment. It is headquartered in Beijing Municipal Administrative Center in Tongzhou District, Beijing.

== History ==
BTG was established in February 1998. In 2004 it merged with Beijing New Yansha Group (the developer of the Golden Resources Mall), restaurant operators Quanjude and Donglaishun, and the Antique City Group. In 2015 BTG bought the Home Inn hotel chain for 11 billion RMB. In 2016 it had RMB 73 billion in assets and RMB 44 billion in revenue. In 2017, China launched the World Tourism Alliance with the support of the BTG.

== Operations ==
The company has six divisions:

- BTG Homeinns — Hotels and resorts
- Travel agencies
- Shopping
- Restaurants
- Coaches and taxis (Shou Qi Group)
- Scenic spots
