= Shanghai No. 2 High School =

Coordinates: 31.210341°N 121.455366°E

Shanghai No.2 High School
- 200 Yongkang Road, Xuhui District 1 Wuben Road, Minhang District; Shanghai

Information
- Former name: Wu Pen Girls' School (务本女塾); Huaijiu Junior High School for Girls (怀久女子中学); Shanghai No.2 Girls' High School (上海市第二女子中学)
- Type: Public School, Shanghai Municipal Demonstrative High School
- Motto: 勤(Diligence), 樸(Modesty), 勇(Bravery), 誠(Honesty)
- Founded: 1902
- Founder: Wu Xin (吴馨)
- Sister school: Needham High School; Wittelsbacher-Realschule Aichach
- Principal: Wang Minzheng (王民政)
- Faculty: 140+
- Grades: 6–12
- Gender: co-ed
- Enrollment: 1440+
- Colours: Red, white
- Alumni: Yao Ming, Hu Ge, Zuo Yi, Xu Zheng, Neil Shen
- Website: http://www.shiers.cn

Shanghai No. 2 High School (simplified Chinese: 上海市第二中学; traditional Chinese: 上海市第二中學) is a public secondary school located in Shanghai, China.

== History ==
Founded in 1902 by Wu Xin as Wu Pen Girls' School (simplified Chinese: 务本女塾; traditional Chinese: 務本女塾), Shanghai No.2 High School holds the distinction of being the first independent girls' school established by Chinese nationals in the 20th century.

In 1947, the school relocated to 200 Yongkang Road (formerly 209 Route Remi), occupying the former campus of Ecole Primaire Russe (俄國初級小學), which was later renamed and known as Ecole Municipale Française-Ecole Rémy (法國雷米小學).

In 1952, Wu Pen Girls' School was renamed Shanghai No. 2 Girls' High School. In September 1967, the institution transitioned into a co-educational public school and was renamed Shanghai No. 2 High School.
