= Chih-Kong Ken Yang =

Professor of electrical engineering

- 楊志剛
- Born: August 17, 1970 (age 56)
- Education: Stanford University (BS, MS, PhD)
- Relatives: Jerry Yang
- Scientific career
- Fields: Electrical engineering
- Workplaces: UCLA Henry Samueli School of Engineering and Applied Science

Chih-Kong Ken Yang (Chinese: 楊志剛; born August 17, 1970) is a Taiwanese electrical engineer. He is a professor of electrical engineering at the University of California, Los Angeles (UCLA), Director of the Integrated Circuits and Systems Laboratories (ICSL), and co-founder of Pluribus Networks, Inc.

== Research ==
His research interests are in the area of high-performance digital and mixed-signal circuit design and high-performance networking. Research areas include the design of high-speed data and clock-recovery circuits for large VLSI systems, design of low-power, high-performance computing building blocks, high-voltage drivers for MEMs applications, power optimization of computing systems, and analog-circuit power optimization for nanometer scale devices.

== Honors and awards ==
- IEEE Fellow, 2011
