= Travix =

Dutch travel website company

Travix International BV
- Company type: Subsidiary
- Industry: Travel; Technology
- Founded: 2011; 15 years ago
- Headquarters: Netherlands
- Key people: Casper Maasdam (CEO)
- Brands: BudgetAir; CheapTickets; Flugladen; Vayama; Vliegwinkel
- Number of employees: 350 (2026)
- Parent: Trip.com Group
- Website: www.travix.com#about

Travix International BV is an Online Travel Agency (OTA) that manages several travel websites operating in various countries. Travix International BV is part of Trip.com group. The company maintains headquarters in Amsterdam, Netherlands.

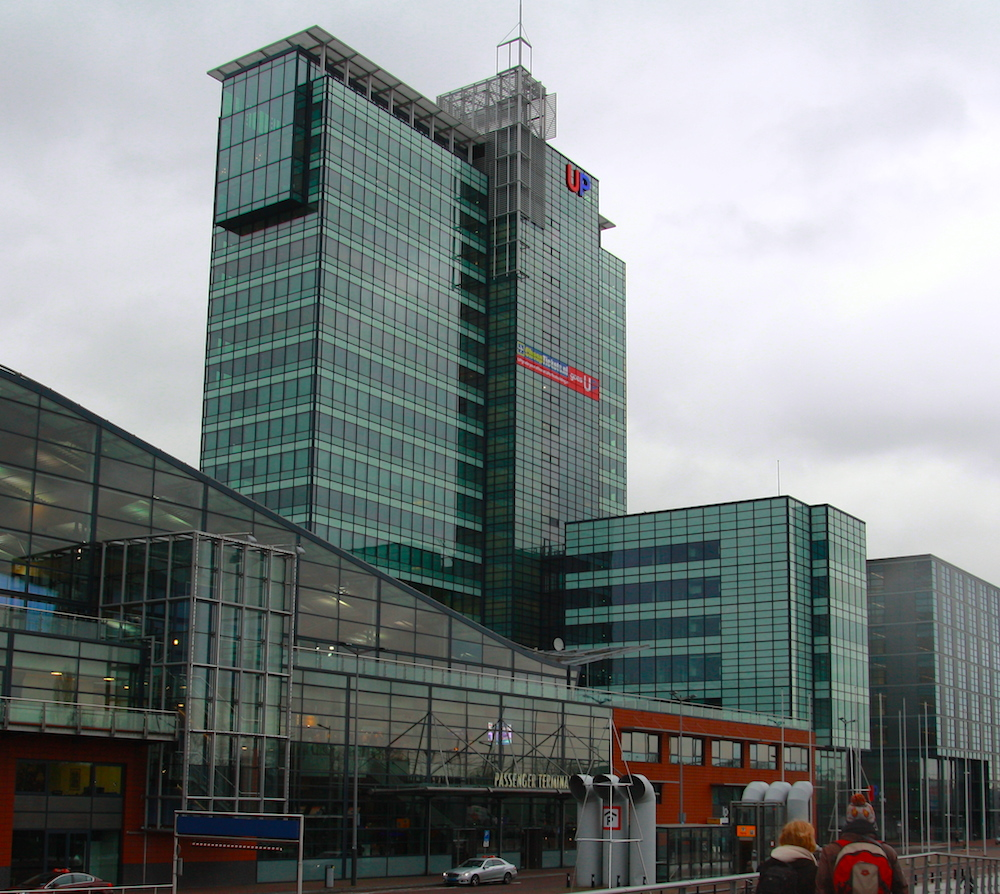
Amsterdam Headquarters

== Operations ==
Travix has a global reach as it manages operates 20 websites with 5 brands (CheapTickets, BudgetAir, Vayama, Vliegwinkel and Flugladen) across 17 countries. Travix has employees across locations Amsterdam, Shanghai and London.

Travix brands CheapTickets and Vliegwinkel operate in the Netherlands, Belgium, Germany and Austria (note: the Travix sites CheapTickets.nl and CheapTickets.de are not related to CheapTickets.com, which is owned by Orbitz). BudgetAir does business in various other markets in Europe and US, Canada, UK, India, Australia. Vayama is operating from Ireland and Flugladen from Germany.

== History ==
Travix was established by a merger of CheapTickets (Beins Travel Group Ltd), Vliegwinkel, Flugladen, BudgetAir (Airtrade) and Vayama in January 2011. The oldest part of the company, Vliegwinkel.nl, was created by Airtrade in Haarlem and founded by Wim Butte and Andre Hesselink. Vliegwinkel.nl was the first online travel agency (OTA) in the Netherlands.

On October 4, 2018, international travel company BCD Group announced that it would take full ownership in Travix International BV after purchasing all outstanding shares from minority shareholder ING Corporate Investments.

In April 2020, the international OTA company Trip.com Group acquired Travix International BV.
