= James Liang =

Chinese American social scientist and businessman

James Jianzhang Liang
- 梁建章
- Born: Liang Jianzhang; 1969 (age 56–57)
- Citizenship: China (Hong Kong)
- Education: Fudan University; Georgia Institute of Technology (MA); Stanford University (PhD)
- Occupation: Businessman
- Known for: Co-founder, chairman, and former CEO, Trip.com Group
- Board member of: MakeMyTrip
- Scientific career
- Fields: Applied economics
- Workplaces: Stanford University; Peking University
- Thesis: Essays on Human Capital and Entrepreneurship (2011)
- Doctoral advisor: Edward Lazear

James Jianzhang Liang (梁建章; born December 1969) is a Chinese social scientist and businessman who has been the chairman of Trip.com Group since 2003. He also is a professor at the Guanghua School of Management at Peking University, conducting research on demographics and social sciences.

He is the former CEO and the co-founder of Trip.com Group. Liang has been vocal on China's population policies since 2012 and in generating public interest in issues such as education and urban planning.

== Early life ==
Liang entered a special class for gifted youths (少年班) at Fudan University in Shanghai in 1985. He studied at Fudan University for one year before leaving to attend Georgia Institute of Technology in the United States.

Liang received a master's degree in computer science from the Georgia Institute of Technology in 1989 and a PhD in economics from Stanford University in 2011.

== Career ==
=== Business ===
From 1991 to 1999, Liang worked for Oracle Corporation in the US and China, in technical and managerial roles, rising to head of Oracle China's ERP consulting division.

Liang co-founded Ctrip in 1999, with Neil Shen, Min Fan, and Ji Qi. He served as CEO from 2000 to January 2006, and again from March 2013 to November 2016. Liang currently serves as executive chairman. In November 2016, Jane Jie Sun succeeded him as CEO.

=== Academia ===
Liang is a scholar of demographics, entrepreneurship, and innovation research. In recent years, he has advocated for the restructuring of China's population and family planning policies, drawing public attention to key issues such as education, ageing, and urban planning.

He is a co-author of the book Too Many People in China?, which analyzes the impact of the one-child policy and the adverse effects of demographic changes on China's economy. He is the author of multiple other publications, including The Rise of the Network Society, The Chinese Dream Calls for the Chinese Child, The Demographics of Innovation, Population Strategies: How Population Affects Economy and Innovation, and Innovation, Heritage, and Meaning of Life. Liang published a demographics-focused novel in 2020, After Immortality, based on a dystopian society.

In 2021, Liang taught a lecture series, 15 Lectures on Demographic Economics. The lecture series was released under the title Age of Ultra-Low Fertility: Population Economics as a podcast and article series, where Liang called on all sectors of society to recognize the impact the low fertility rate, ageing population and other realities will continue to have on Chinese society after the liberalization of the three-child policy, whilst advocating for the government to actively encourage raising fertility.

== Publications ==
- Innovation, Heritage, and Meaning of Life
- Population Strategies: How Population Impacts Economy and Innovation
- After Immortality
- The Demographics of Innovation: Why Demographics is a Key to the Innovation Race'
- Too Many People in China?
- The Rise of the Network Society'

== Public Commentary ==
In April and May 2022, Liang published several articles questioning the Chinese government's zero-COVID strategy. He argued that overly strict pandemic controls could cause more harm to the economy and population life expectancy than the virus itself. These writings, posted to his verified Weibo account and other platforms such as China Enterprise News and the Center for China and Globalization, were later removed by censors. His Weibo account, which had approximately 817,000 followers, was subsequently suspended for "violating relevant laws and regulations." Weibo did not specify which laws were breached.
