= Motel 168 =

Chinese hotel chain

- Headquarters: China
- Products: Hotels

Motel 168 (Chinese: 莫泰168; pinyin: Mòtài 168) is a hotel brand of Home Inn. It formerly belonged to Shanghai Motel Management Co., Ltd. The company was owned by Shanghai Merrylin Restaurant Management Co., Ltd (S: 上海美林阁餐饮经营管理有限公司) and Merrylin Hotel Management Co., Ltd. The Shanghai Merrylin company had its headquarters in Changning District, Shanghai.

== History ==
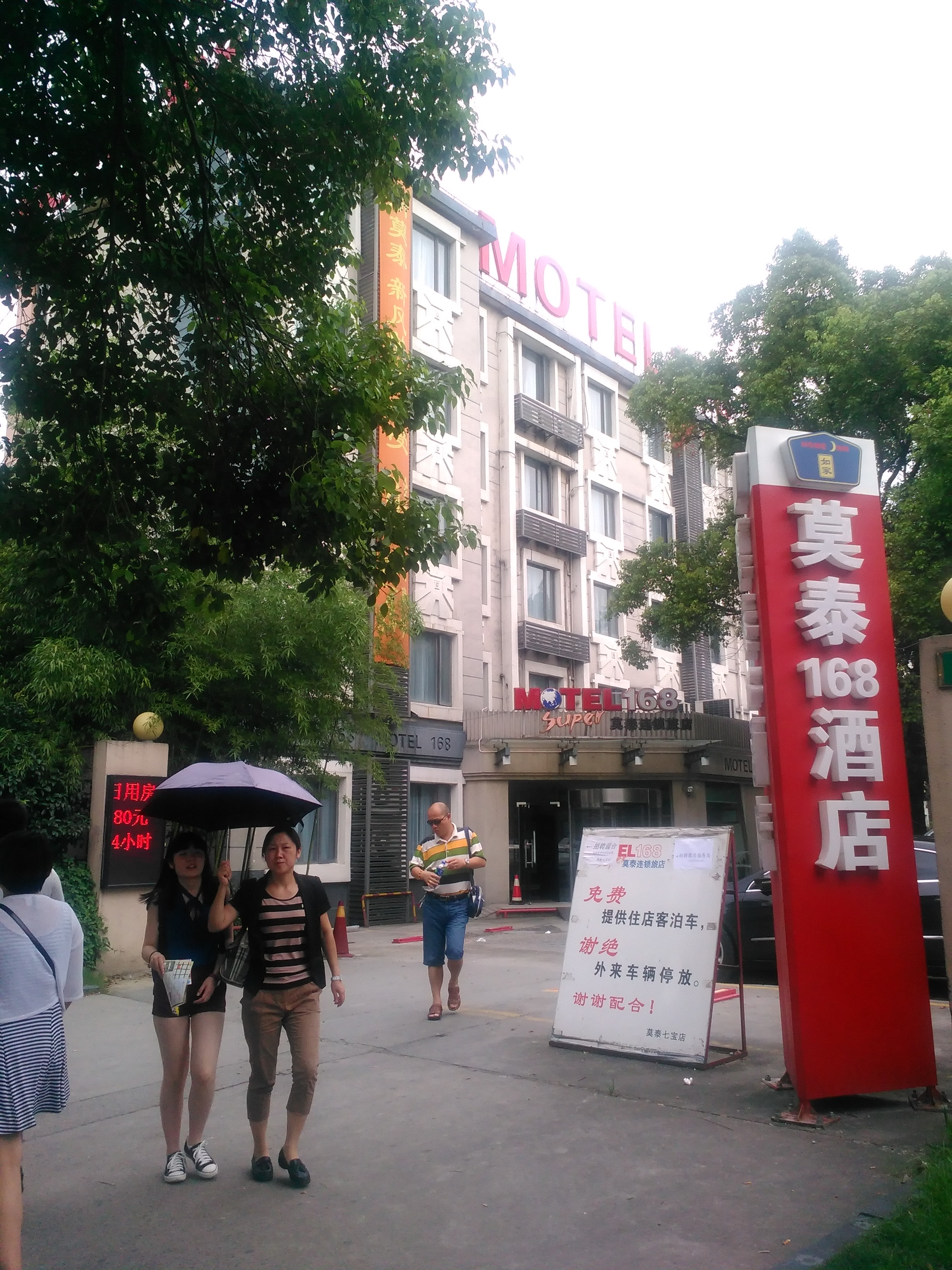
A Motel 168 in Shanghai

In 2006, Morgan Stanley purchased 20% of the Motel 168 company for $20 million United States dollars. Morgan Stanley bought shares of Motel 168 two additional times to give it a total ownership of 59%.

As of 2008, Motel 168, Home Inn, and Jinjiang Inn together controlled 44% of China's budget hotel market. In March 2011, Morgan Stanley indicated its desire to sell the company. Home Inn, Hanting Hotel Group, Shanghai International Jin Jiang Hotel Group, and Accor were among potential bidders which expressed interest in acquiring Motel 168. Home Inn acquired Motel 168 in October 2011. The deal was valued at approximately $470 million.

== Operations ==
Motel 268 was the economy brand of Motel 168. Jiazhen Huo and Zhisheng Hong, authors of Service Science in China, wrote that 268 was a part of the company's multi-branding strategy. Motel 168 locations included Merrylin Cafeteria, which served European themed food.
