= Carol Bartz =

American computer scientist and business executive (born 1948)

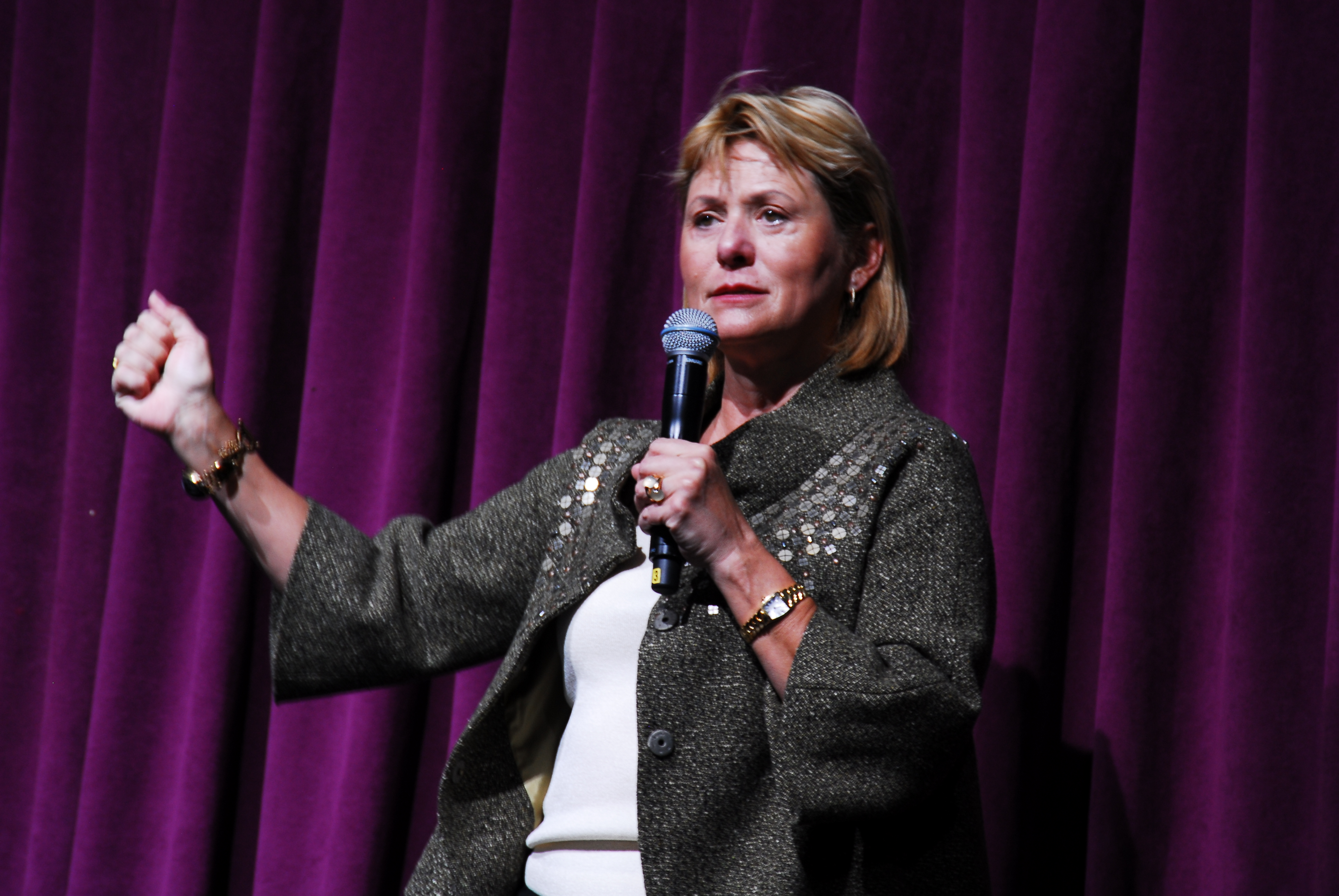
- Bartz at her first Yahoo! all hands meeting (2009)
- Born: Carol Ann Bartz; August 28, 1948 (age 78); Winona, Minnesota, U.S.
- Education: William Woods University; University of Wisconsin–Madison
- Known for: Former CEO of Yahoo! (2009-2011)

Carol Ann Bartz (born August 28, 1948) is an American business executive, former president and CEO of the internet services company Yahoo!, and former chairman, president, and CEO at architectural and engineering design software company Autodesk.

== Early life and education ==
Bartz was born in Winona, Minnesota, the daughter of Shirley Ann (née Giese) and Virgil Julius Bartz. Her mother died when Carol was eight years old. A few years later, she and her younger brother, Jim, moved from Minnesota across the Mississippi River to the home of their grandmother, Alice, on a dairy farm near Alma, Wisconsin. In high school, Bartz did well in mathematics, and was also homecoming queen. She began college at William Woods University in Fulton, Missouri, and subsequently transferred to the University of Wisconsin–Madison where she received a bachelor's degree in computer science in 1971. While in college, she supported herself as a cocktail waitress.

Bartz was also awarded an Honorary Doctorate of Humane Letters degree (2002) from New Jersey Institute of Technology, an Honorary Doctor of Science degree from Worcester Polytechnic Institute and an honorary Doctor of Letters degree from William Woods University.

== Career ==
In 1976, Bartz went to work at the manufacturing conglomerate 3M, but left after her request to transfer to the headquarters was denied. Bartz moved on to the computer industry, including jobs at Digital Equipment Corporation and Sun Microsystems.

=== CEO of Autodesk ===
She became CEO of Autodesk in 1992. According to Forbes, Bartz "transformed Autodesk from an aimless maker of PC software into a leader of computer-aided design software, targeting architects and builders." She is credited with instituting and promoting Autodesk's "3F" or "fail fast-forward" concept, also referred to as fail fast – the idea of moulding a company to risk failure in some missions, but to be resilient and move on quickly when failure occurs. She stepped down as CEO in 2006, and became the executive chairman of the board.

During her 14-year tenure as the company's CEO, Autodesk net revenue substantially increased, and annual revenue rose from $300 million to $1.5 billion, with the stock price rising an average of 20 percent annually.

Bartz served on several boards of directors, including those of Intel, Cisco Systems, Autodesk, BEA Systems, Network Appliance, and the Foundation for the National Medals of Science. Additionally, she has been a member of the United States President's Council of Advisors on Science and Technology.

=== CEO of Yahoo! ===
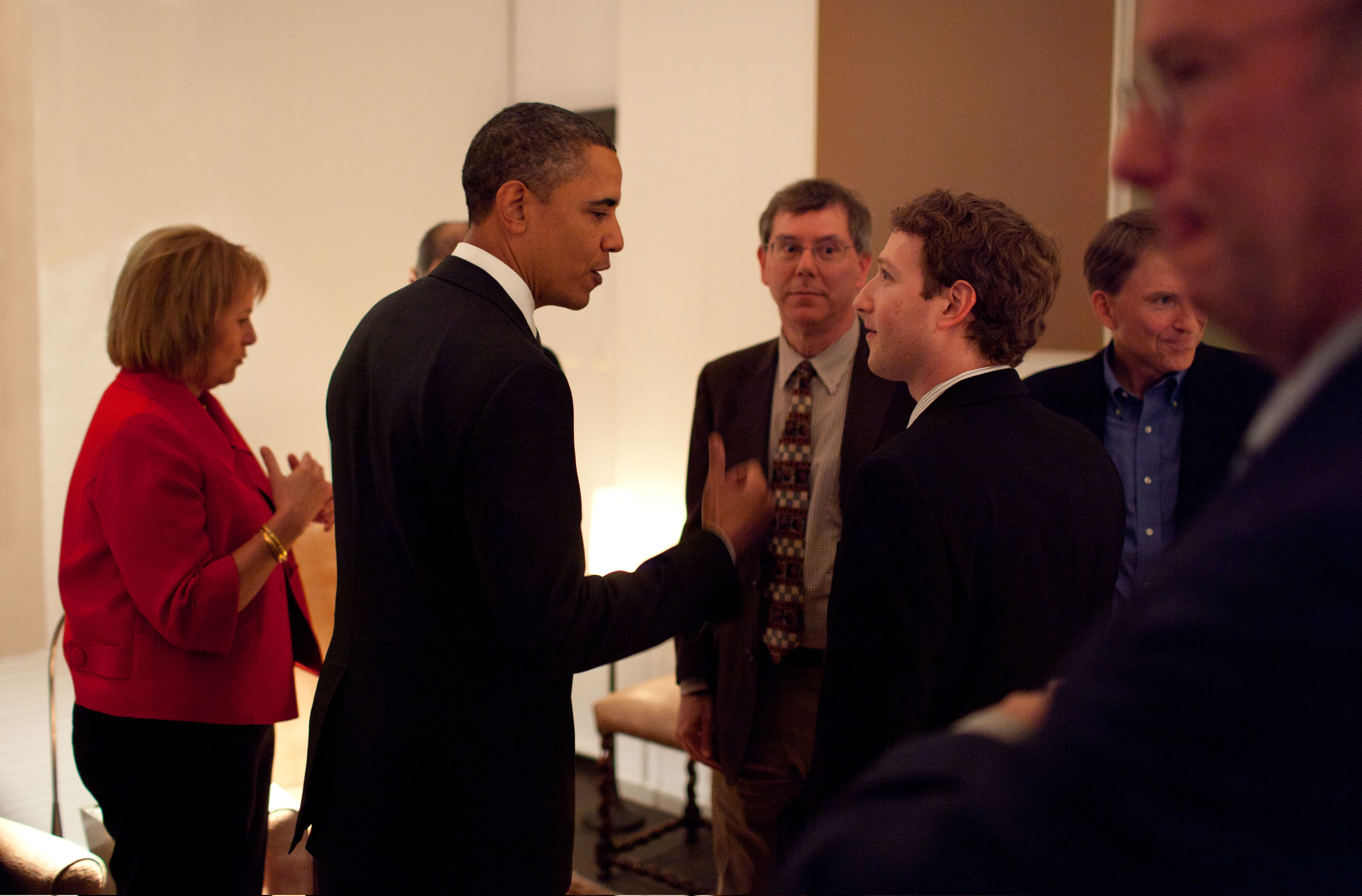
Bartz pictured far left. Mark Zuckerberg listens to President Barack Obama before a private meeting where Obama dined with technology business leaders in Woodside, California, February 17, 2011. (Also pictured, from left: Carol Bartz, Art Levinson of Genentech, Steve Westly of The Westly Group, and Eric Schmidt of Google.)

On January 13, 2009, Bartz was named CEO of Yahoo!, the Internet services company which operated the fourth most-visited Web domain name in the world, succeeding co-founder Jerry Yang. During a conference call with financial analysts later in January 2009, she announced her intention to make sure Yahoo! got "some friggin' breathing room" so the company could "kick some butt." Rob Hof of Business Week was skeptical that Bartz or anyone else could save the company: "... it's not yet clear if Bartz can turn Yahoo around no matter how good she may be."

In May 2009, Reuters reported that she had already "worked through an impressive checklist" at her new company, "upending the organizational structure, replacing executives and cutting costs, including 675 jobs, or 5 percent of the workforce." Analysts described her efforts as precisely what the company required; reporter Alexei Oreskovic observed:

For Yahoo's ranks, still shell-shocked from deep cuts in 2008 – including 1,600 axed jobs – the hope that Bartz brings is increasingly mixed with a dose of fear and uncertainty. Yet broad support remains for Bartz despite the tough talk, canceled holiday parties and forced vacations that have come to define her era.

Staff became anxious over a fresh round of job layoffs and the removal of a number of Yahoo! sites. The situation was then "exacerbated by a growing sense of secrecy", for which Bartz has a notable reputation. A need to know agenda replaced the company's typically open internal access to information. Bartz was quoted as saying that she would "drop-kick to fucking Mars" employees who leak to the press. Oreskovic quoted a fearful anonymous insider: "We are all sort of wanting to believe in her because we really want to see Yahoo! turned around, but it still doesn't make it any less scary when you don't hear about what's coming up. Everything is on a need-to-know basis."

When Bartz was hired by Yahoo in early 2009, she was paid an annual base salary of $1 million. She was eligible for an annual 400% bonus and received 5,000,000 shares in addition to an equity grant of $18 million of stock (to compensate for the forfeiture of the value of equity grants and post-employment medical coverage from her previous employer). In 2010 Bartz was named "most overpaid" CEO by proxy voting firm Glass-Lewis when she received $47.2 million in compensation.

On September 6, 2011, Bartz was removed from her position at Yahoo! (via phone call by Yahoo Chairman Roy Bostock), and CFO Tim Morse was named as Interim CEO of the company. Bartz notes that Roy was physically 20 minutes away from her when she was fired, noting that "he didn't have the nerve to see [her] face to face" and later stated that the board "fucked me over". Bartz expressed her desire to remain on the Board of Directors. However, on September 9, 2011, Bartz resigned from the company's Board of Directors.

=== Corporate board memberships ===
Bartz has been a member of eight public company boards in the last 20 years. As of February 2018, she sits on the board of PlanGrid and Cisco. In December 2017, she was reported to own over fifty-two thousand Cisco shares, worth approximately $1.6 million.

Bartz is an investor in Caliva, a cannabis-based business.

== Awards ==
Bartz received the Ernst & Young Entrepreneur Of The Year Award in 2001, which spans more than 140 cities and 50 countries worldwide. In 2005, she was included in Forbes Magazine's List of The World's 100 Most Powerful Women, and remained appearing in the list for six consecutive years.

== Personal life ==
Bartz is a survivor of breast cancer. She is married to Bill Marr, a former executive at Data General and Sun Microsystems. They have three children: Bill, Meredith, and Layne.

Business positions
Preceded by Susan Decker as President of Yahoo	President and Chief Executive Officer of Yahoo; 2009–2011	Succeeded by Tim Morse; Acting
Preceded by Jerry Yang as CEO of Yahoo	President and Chief Executive Officer of Yahoo; 2009–2011	Succeeded by Tim Morse; Acting
