= PlanGrid =

Construction productivity software

- Industry: Software
- Founded: 2011
- Fate: Acquired by Autodesk (2018)
- Headquarters: San Francisco, California, United States
- Number of employees: 400 (2018)
- Website: app.plangrid.com

PlanGrid was a construction productivity software designed for onsite construction workers. PlanGrid digitized blueprints, and featured version control and collaboration tools such as field markups, progress photos and issues tracking.

In December 2018, Autodesk acquired PlanGrid for $875 million.

== History ==
PlanGrid was headquartered in San Francisco, California and was founded in 2011. It was available on mobile and Microsoft Windows devices. The software could store, view, and communicate construction blueprints.

The company's board of directors included former Salesforce COO George Hu, Sequoia Capital Partner Doug Leone, and former Autodesk CEO Carol Bartz.

PlanGrid's CEO, Tracy Young, was named to Fast Company's "Most Creative People in Business" in 2015.

Autodesk announced plans in November 2018 to acquire PlanGrid for US$875 million. The acquisition was completed on December 20, 2018 and later phased out the name PlanGrid completely.

== Fundraising history ==
The company's seed-stage investors include Y-Combinator, Sam Altman, Paul Buchheit and 500 Startups.

In May 2015, PlanGrid raised a $18 million Series A from Sequoia Capital.

In November 2015, PlanGrid raised a $40 million Series B led by Tenaya Capital.
