= Zoombu =

Zoombu was a travel metasearch engine for Europe. The company was acquired by Skyscanner and shutdown.

Users were able to enter their starting and destination addresses and the service searches thousands of routes across combinations of transportation including flights, trains, ferries, and ground transfers including taxis, driving, and car parking. Results could be filtered according to specific user preferences, budget, time available and carbon footprint. The service was independent of any particular carrier and searches hundreds of transportation carriers. Zoombu did not include booking capabilities, but instead it linked to transportation suppliers, where it is possible to book components of any route.

The company was based in South-West London.

== History ==
The idea for Zoombu was developed by Dr Alistair Hann whilst working as a researcher at the University of Oxford in 2008. He was frustrated at the time it took to search for flight routes and compare these to alternatives such as taking the train or ferry, then research connections to determine the best overall option. Others shared his frustration and he entered the idea for a door-to-door travel search engine into a competition run by Oxford Entrepreneurs called Ideal Idol, which he won. Shortly afterwards he asked Rachel Evatt (née Armitage), a friend and colleague from undergraduate engineering at Oxford, to co-found the business.

Zoombu's search engine was available to a handful of users on a private basis from mid-2009. In March 2010, Zoombu's Beta product was opened to the public, catering for searches from the UK to within Europe. In April 2010, the product was still in Beta and broader geographical coverage was expected to be added in September 2010.

In January 2011, Skyscanner acquired Zoombu.

== Awards ==
- The University of Oxford Saïd Business School Venture Fund, 2009
- Finalist at Seedcamp in 2008
