= Skyscanner =

Online travel agency and metasearch engine

Skyscanner Holdings Ltd.
- Type: Subsidiary
- Industry: Travel
- Founded: 2002; 24 years ago
- Founders: Gareth Williams; Barry Smith; Bonamy Grimes
- Headquarters: Edinburgh, Scotland, United Kingdom
- Key people: Bryan Batista (CEO)
- Revenue: £540.6 million (2025)
- Net income: £56.9 million (2025)
- Number of employees: 1,500+ (2026)
- Parent: Trip.com Group
- Website: www.skyscanner.net

Skyscanner Holdings Limited, a subsidiary of Trip.com Group, is a travel search aggregator, metasearch engine, and comparison shopping website based in Edinburgh, Scotland, with operating activities conducted through its subsidiaries including Skyscanner Limited and Skyscanner Technology Limited. The company's platforms receive 110 million monthly visitors. The company is not a travel agent and does not directly sell tickets, process payments, or handle bookings; these are all handled by one of 1,200 partners.

The company allows users to find the cheapest destinations from a given city by setting "Everywhere" as the destination.

== History ==
=== Startup ===
Skyscanner was founded by Gareth Williams, Barry Smith, and Bonamy Grimes in Scotland 2002 and launched in 2003. Williams was a software developer who designed software to search multiple airline websites for the best fares after he became frustrated at visiting each website individually whenever he wanted to visit his brother in France.

The company's first office was opened in 2004 in Edinburgh.

In December 2007, Scottish Equity Partners (SEP) invested £2.5 million in the company for a 40% stake.

In 2009, Skyscanner reported its first profit.

=== Expansion ===
In January 2011, Skyscanner acquired Zoombu.

Skyscanner opened an office in Singapore in September 2011, which is the headquarters for its Asia-Pacific operations.

In 2012, the company opened an office in Beijing after forming a partnership with Baidu.

In 2012, the company moved its headquarters to Quartermile.

By 2013, the company employed over 180 people.

In February 2013, Skyscanner announced plans to open a United States base in Miami.

In October 2013, Sequoia Capital invested in the company at an $800 million valuation.

In June 2014, Skyscanner acquired Youbibi, a travel search engine company based in Shenzhen, China.

By February 2015, the company employed 600 people, double the employment of 18 months earlier.

In January 2016, the company raised £128 million ($192 million) at a $1.6 billion valuation, making it a unicorn. Investors included Artemis, Baillie Gifford, Vitruvian Partners, Khazanah Nasional, and Yahoo Japan. SEP, which owned a 40% stake in 2007, sold 5%.

In 2016, the company was named to the "Fast 50" by Deloitte.

=== Ownership by Trip.com ===
In November 2016, Trip.com Group acquired Skyscanner for $1.75 billion; SEP sold its entire stake.

In 2017, Ctrip acquired the Trip.com domain name and launched Trip.com as a subsidiary of Skyscanner.

In July 2020, as a result of a decline in bookings during the COVID-19 pandemic, the company announced 300 layoffs (20% of its staff) and the closure of offices in Budapest, Hungary and Sofia, Bulgaria.

Skyscanner Technology Limited was established in November 2024, with the transfer of Skyscanner's UK engineering employees, assets and associated intellectual property taking place during 2025.

Effective June 2025, Bryan Batista, formerly chief operations officer, was named CEO, replacing John Mangelaars.

In September 2026 Skyscanner Technology Limited employees unionised as part of Prospect in the first unionisation of a Scottish tech unicorn.
