= Timothy Koogle =

American executive (born 1951)

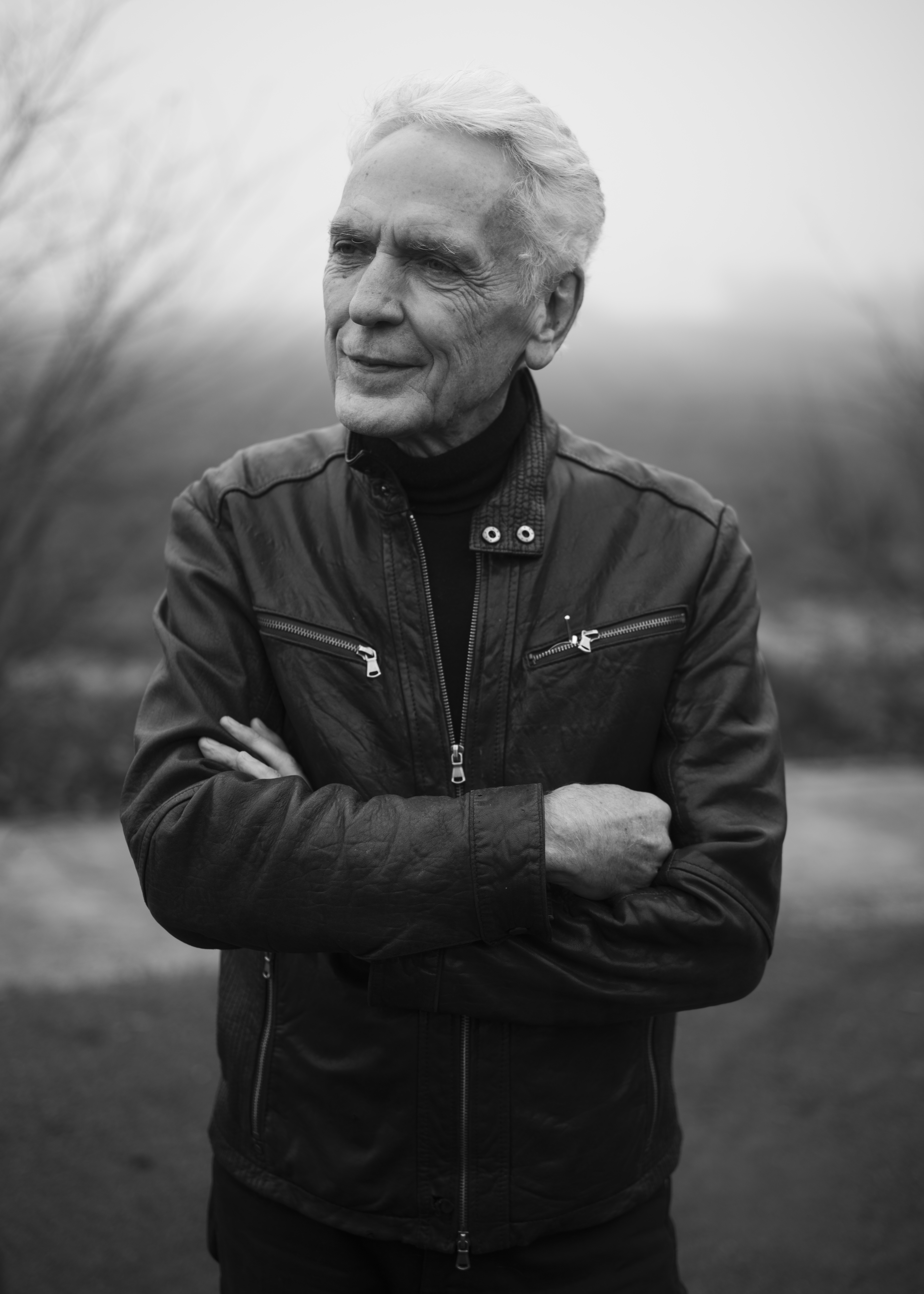
- Koogle in 2021
- Born: Timothy Andrew Koogle; July 5, 1951 (age 75); Alexandria, Virginia, U.S.
- Years active: 1990s–present
- Employer: Yahoo!
- Known for: First CEO of Yahoo!

Timothy Andrew Koogle (born July 5, 1951) is an American executive who served as the first CEO and president of web company Yahoo! between 1995 and 2001. He served as the company's chairman from 1999 to 2003. He was named to the Top 25 Executives of the Year by BusinessWeek in 1999 and 2000.

== Early life and education ==
Koogle was born and grew up in the Washington, D.C. suburb of Alexandria and graduated from Mount Vernon High School in 1969. He obtained a B.S. degree from the University of Virginia in mechanical engineering in 1973, and his M.S. and Ph.D. in engineering from Stanford University in 1975 and 1977.

== Professional ==
While still at Stanford, Koogle formed two businesses, an auto repair business that eventually specialized in making racing engines, and a mechanical design and prototyping firm that evolved into a company called Phase 2, which specialized in industrial robots.

Koogle sold Phase 2 to Motorola in 1981, and later wound down his racing engine business. In 1983, Koogle went to work for Motorola.

In 1992, Koogle became president of Litton Industries' Intermec division, replacing John W. Paxton. He concurrently served as a senior vice president of Western Atlas.

After just over two years at Intermec, Koogle was approached by headhunter Alan Sabourin, who had been tasked by venture capitalist and Yahoo! director Michael Moritz to find a CEO for the new company. Koogle first met with Yahoo! founders Jerry Yang and David Filo in June 1995, and became CEO and president of the company in August, beating out a half-dozen other candidates for the job.

Business positions
New office	Chief Executive Officer of Yahoo! 1995–2001	Succeeded by Terry Semel
