= HSG (investment firm) =

Chinese venture capital firm

- Native name: 红杉中国
- Formerly: Sequoia China
- Type: Private
- Industry: Venture capital
- Founded: 2005; 21 years ago
- Founders: Neil Shen; Zhang Fan
- Key people: Neil Shen (Founding and Managing Partner)
- AUM: US$61 billion (2026)
- Number of employees: 300 (2026)
- Website: www.hsgcap.com

HSG (Chinese: 红杉中国; pinyin: Hóngshān Zhōngguó) is a global venture capital and private equity firm founded in 2005. It was previously the China investment arm of Sequoia Capital, known as "Sequoia China." It separated from Sequoia in a split announced in 2023 and rebranded as HSG. In Chinese, the firm is known as 红杉 (HongShan), which means 'redwood.' HSG has offices in Hong Kong, Beijing, Shanghai, London, Singapore, Shenzhen, and Tokyo.

HSG has expanded its focus over the years beyond early-stage investing to also cover growth stage, infrastructure, healthcare and consumer, and buyout funds. The firm manages around $61 billion in assets.

== Background ==
=== Sequoia Capital China (2005 to 2023) ===
In 2005, Neil Shen and Zhang Fan co-founded Sequoia Capital China with the guidance of Sequoia partners Michael Moritz and Douglas Leone. The two were selected by Sequoia to lead the firm's venture in China.

In 2009, Zhang resigned from Sequoia China for personal reasons leaving Shen to be entirely in charge of Sequoia China's operations. By that period, the firm had raised a combined $1 billion for three U.S. dollar-denominated China funds and 1 billion yuan for a local currency yuan-denominated investment fund.

Afterwards Sequoia China raised more money, mostly from US institutional investors and built a successful investment record which included companies such as Alibaba Group, JD.com, Meituan, Pinduoduo, Shein and ByteDance. Historically 90% of returns came from consumer, consumer tech and healthcare fields. No other US investment manager had the same level of success in China as Sequoia China. By 2023, Sequoia China had invested in over 1,000 projects.

In 2021, the firm acquired a controlling stake in the French fashion brand Ami Paris.

In June 2023, Sequoia announced that its U.S., India, and China business unit would separate into three independent entities by 31 March 2024. The Financial Times and Bloomberg linked the split at a time of rising tensions between the U.S. and China, which had made it harder for Sequoia to invest in Chinese industries such as semiconductors and artificial intelligence. Sequoia denied that the tensions were behind the split and said its shared brand was confusing the market and creating conflicts between portfolios.

=== As an independent firm (2023 to present) ===
In July 2023, the Financial Times reported that HSG had set up an office in Singapore and planned to use it as a base to invest in Southeast Asia, which the FT said would put it in competion with Peak XV Partners, the India and Southeast Asia business that was also separating from Sequoia. Both firms told the FT they saw opportunities to collaborate.

In October 2023, the United States House Select Committee on China wrote to Sequoia asking for details of investments made by Sequoia and the firm, then Sequoia's China arm, in Chinese companies working in artificial intelligence and other high-tech sectors. The committee questioned whether the separation would insulate some capital flows from US regulatory scrutiny. The letter also accused the firm of funneling US capital into investments that contributed to human rights abuses and military modernization, citing its investment in DeepGlint, and took issue with Sequoia's backing of ByteDance. The firm said there was "no truth" to claims that it invested in businesses that breached its risk and compliance protocols, which cover human rights violations and military involvement.

In November 2023, Bloomberg reported that several institutions, including CalPERS and the University of Washington Investment Management, had made their first commitments to the firm's funds in 2022, and that existing investors such as CPP Investment Board and Regents of the University of California had continued to invest.

In July 2024, HSG raised its first new fund as a separate entity. It raised 18 billion RMB ($2.5 billion) for its new fund to invest in startups.

In October 2024, HSG set up a London office to look for investment opportunities in Europe with plans to make overseas investments.

In November 2024, the Financial Times reported HSG was struggling to deploy its large cash pile in a sluggish domestic market and tightening US controls.

In 2025, HSG acquired a majority stake in the audio equipment maker Marshall Group. The deal, valued at $1.1 billion, became HSG's largest investment in Europe.

HSG opened an office in Tokyo, Japan in February 2025.

In September 2025, HSG was shortlisted together with EQT, The Carlyle Group, and Boyu Capital to bid for a controlling stake in Starbucks' China operations.

In October 2025, Bayer AG was reported to be selling its global Avelox antibiotics business to HSG.

In December 2025, HSG acquired a majority stake in Italian luxury fashion company Golden Goose.

In August 2026, Bloomberg reported that HSG had held preliminary talks with investors to raise at least $1.2 billion for an early-stage fund targeting artificial intelligence, healthcare, and consumer companies. The fund would be the firm's first dollar-denominated vehicle since its separation from Sequoia Capital.
