= Jerry Yang =

American programmer and entrepreneur (born 1968)

- 楊致遠
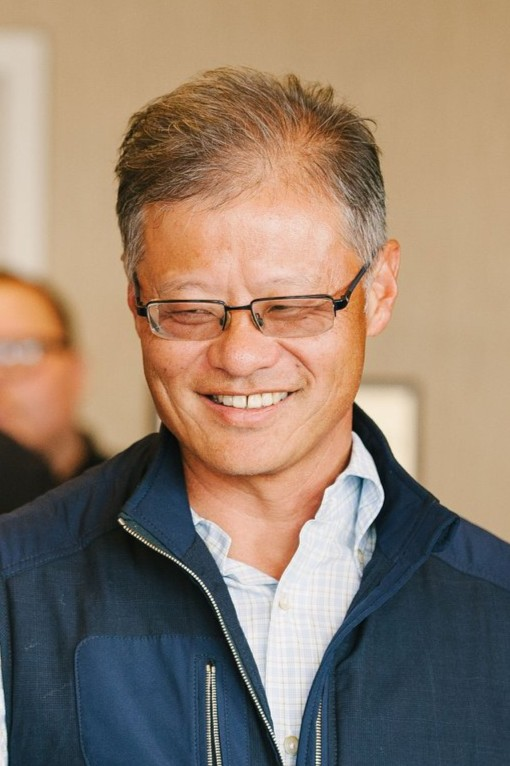
- Yang in 2020
- Born: Yang Chih-Yuan; November 6, 1968 (age 58); Taipei, Taiwan
- Education: Stanford University (BS, MS)
- Occupations: Founding Partner, AME Cloud Ventures
- Spouse: Akiko Yamazaki
- Relatives: Chih-Kong Ken Yang (brother)

Chinese name
- Traditional Chinese: 楊致遠
- Simplified Chinese: 杨致远
Transcriptions
Standard Mandarin
- Hanyu Pinyin: Yáng Zhìyuǎn
Southern Min
- Hokkien POJ: iông tì oán

Jerry Chih-Yuan Yang (Chinese: 楊致遠; pinyin: Yáng Zhìyuǎn; born Yang Chih-Yuan; November 6, 1968) is a Taiwanese-born American billionaire computer programmer, internet entrepreneur, and venture capitalist. He is the co-founder and former CEO of Yahoo! Inc. and founding partner of AME Cloud Ventures. As of May 2025, Yang has a net worth of $3.1 billion.

== Early life and education ==
Yang was born Yang Chih-Yuan in Taipei, Taiwan, on November 6, 1968. His mother was a professor of English and drama and his father died when he was two. Yang has a younger brother, Chih-Kong Ken Yang. In 1978, his mother moved the family to San Jose, California, where his grandmother and extended family took care of the boys while his mother taught English to other immigrants. After moving to the US, Yang took the American name Jerry; his mother, Lily; and his younger brother, Ken. He says that he only knew one English word, "shoe", when he came to America, but became fluent in English in about three years.

During his time at San Jose, Yang attended Ruskin Elementary School, Sierramont Middle, and Piedmont Hills High School. He graduated from Piedmont Hills High School and went on to earn both a Bachelor of Science and a Master of Science in electrical engineering from Stanford University in four years. He initiated into Tau Beta Pi (the National Engineering Honor Society) in 1990. He met David Filo at Stanford in 1989, and the two went to Japan in 1992 for a six-month exchange program, where he met his future wife, Akiko Yamazaki, also participating in the exchange program.

== Career ==
Yang founded Yahoo! in 1994 and was CEO from 2007 to 2009. He left Yahoo! in 2012. He founded a venture capital firm called AME Cloud Ventures and, as of 2015, is on several corporate boards. According to Rob Solomon, a venture capitalist at Accel Partners, Yang was "a great founder, evangelist, strategist and mentor," having "created the blueprint for what is possible on the Internet."

=== 1994–2012: Yahoo! years ===
While studying at Stanford in 1994, Yang and David Filo co-created an Internet website called "Jerry and David's Guide to the World Wide Web," which consisted of a directory of other websites. As it grew in popularity they renamed it "Yahoo! Inc." Yahoo! received around 100,000 unique visitors by the fall of 1994. In April 1995, Yahoo! received a $2 million investment from Sequoia Capital, Tim Koogle was hired as CEO, and Yang and Filo were each appointed "Chief Yahoo." Yahoo! received a second round of funding in the Fall of 1995 from Reuters and Softbank. It went public in April 1996 with 49 employees. In 1999, Yang was named to the MIT Technology Review TR100 as one of the top 100 innovators in the world under the age of 35. Terry Semel, who replaced Tim Koogle as CEO after the dot-com bubble crash, was CEO until 2007 when the rise of Google led the board to fire him and appoint Yang as interim CEO.

==== Alibaba ====
Yang met Alibaba founder Jack Ma in 1997 during Yang's first trip to China. Ma, a government-employed tour guide and former English teacher, gave Yang a tour of the Great Wall of China. The two hit it off and discussed the growth of the Web. Ma created Alibaba several months later. A 1997 photo of Yang and Ma at the Great Wall still hangs on the wall in Alibaba's Hangzhou office.

In 2005, under Yang's direction but before he took over as CEO in 2007, Yahoo! purchased a 40% stake in Alibaba for $1 billion plus the assets of Yahoo! China, valued at $700 million. In 2012, Yahoo! sold a portion of its stake in Alibaba for $7.6 billion. The company made an additional $9.4 billion in Alibaba's 2014 IPO. Eric Jackson, the founder of hedge fund Ironfire Capital, called Yahoo!'s investment in Alibaba "the best investment an American company has ever made in China," and stated, "Jerry deserves enormous credit for that."

==== Chinese government controversies ====
In the fall 2005, a month after the Alibaba investment, news broke that Yahoo! had cooperated with Chinese authorities in the arrest of Chinese journalist Shi Tao in November 2004. Shi had used a Yahoo email address to anonymously notify a pro-democracy website in the US that the Chinese government had ordered the Chinese media not to cover the fifteenth anniversary of the Tiananmen Square Protests of 1989 on June 4. Yahoo! provided the Chinese security agencies with the IP addresses of the senders, the recipients and the time of the message. Shi was subsequently convicted for "divulging state secrets abroad."

Yang justified the action, stating: "To be doing business in China or anywhere else in the world, we have to comply with local law[s]." Yang and Yahoo! were heavily criticized, and Reporters Without Borders called Yahoo! "a Chinese police informant."

In April 2007, Wang Xiaoning and other journalists brought a civil suit against Yahoo! for allegedly aiding and abetting the Chinese government which, it was claimed, resulted in torture that included beatings and imprisonment.

In early November 2007, Yang faced questions from a Congressional committee with respect to Yahoo!'s role in the arrests of Tao and other journalists in China. During the hearings he apologized to Tao's mother, who was also at the hearing.

A week later, Yahoo! agreed to settle with the affected Chinese dissidents, paying them undisclosed compensation. Yang stated, "After meeting with the families, it was clear to me what we had to do to make this right for them, for Yahoo, and for the future." That week, Yang established the Yahoo! Human Rights Fund, a fund to provide "humanitarian and legal support" to online dissidents.

In February 2008, Secretary of State Condoleezza Rice said that she raised issues about jailed Chinese journalists with her Chinese counterpart Yang Jiechi; she cited a letter from Jerry Yang requesting her assistance in freeing the jailed dissidents. Late in 2008, the Laogai Museum opened; the museum was run by noted Chinese dissident Harry Wu and showcased China's laogai penal system. It was funded by the Yahoo! Human Rights Fund.

On September 2, 2020, a lawsuit was filed on behalf of Chinese activist Ning Xianhua against past Yahoo! executives, including Yang and Semel. The lawsuit was filed in the US District Court in San Jose, California. It alleges that Yahoo! provided Xianhua's private emails to the Chinese government in exchange for commercial access to more Chinese internet users.

==== Microsoft negotiations ====
In February 2008, Microsoft made an unsolicited offer to buy Yahoo! for $44.6 billion; at the time Yahoo! was still struggling to catch up to Google, while Microsoft was still seeking an internet search strategy. The offer was a 62% premium to Yahoo!'s market value at the time. The negotiations were difficult, as Yang had no desire to sell Yahoo! and would not make a counter offer. Once the negotiations ended in failure in May 2008, Yahoo!'s stock price plunged. Yang and board chairman Roy Bostock were strongly criticized by investors for their handling of negotiations, which later led to several shareholder lawsuits and a proxy fight led by Carl Icahn, which was settled in July 2008.

Yang's response to the Microsoft takeover was to make a commercial search advertising arrangement with Google but they ended negotiation after U.S. authorities voiced concerns regarding the effect on competition in the market.

==== Resignation as CEO to departure ====
On November 17, 2008, The Wall Street Journal reported Yang would step down as CEO as soon as the company found a replacement. He was CEO until 2009, when Yahoo! named Carol Bartz as CEO. He regained his former position as "Chief Yahoo" and remained on Yahoo's board of directors.

In January 2012, Yahoo! announced that Yang was leaving the company and would be resigning from the board and all other positions at the company. The company also announced his resignation from the boards of Yahoo! Japan and Alibaba Corp.

=== AME Cloud Ventures ===
After leaving Yahoo! he became a mentor to technology startups and an investor through his firm, AME Cloud Ventures. AME (pronounced "ah-meh") invests primarily in companies that work with data and has provided funding to more than 50 startups, including Tango, Evernote, Wattpad, Wish, Zoom and Vectra Networks Inc., and Chinese travel site Shijiebang. "Ame" means "rain" in Japanese, a nod to Yang's interest in cloud computing.

=== Board seats ===
- Yahoo! (1995–2012)
- Cisco (2000–2012)
- Alibaba Group (2006–2012; 2014– )
- Stanford University Board of Trustees (2005–2015; 2017– ); Chair (2021–2025)
- Workday, Inc. (2013– )
- Curbside (2013–2018)
- Lenovo Group Limited (2013–2023)

== Personal life ==
Yang is married to Japan-born Akiko Yamazaki, who was raised in Costa Rica. They met in 1992 during a 6-month Stanford exchange program. Yamazaki graduated from Stanford University with a degree in industrial engineering and is a director with the Wildlife Conservation Network. Yang currently lives in Los Altos Hills, California.

== Philanthropy and impact ==
In February 2007, Yang and his wife gave $75 million to Stanford University, their alma mater, $50 million of which went to building the "Jerry Yang and Akiko Yamazaki Environment and Energy Building", a multi-disciplinary research, teaching and lab building designed with sustainable architecture principles.

In late 2012 and early 2013, the Asian Art Museum of San Francisco exhibited selections from the Chinese calligraphy collection belonging to Yang and his wife. He began the collection in the late 1990s; it contains about 250 pieces. These selections also appeared at the Metropolitan Museum of Art in the 2014 exhibition "Out of Character: Decoding Chinese Calligraphy."

In September 2017, Yang and Yamazaki pledged $25 million to the Asian Art Museum, the largest donation in the museum's history.

A new pavilion at the museum, funded by Yang and Yamazaki's donation and named in their honor, opened in 2020.

Yang and Yamazaki loaned more than 50 Chinese ink paintings to Stanford's Cantor Arts Center in summer 2018 for its "Ink Worlds" exhibition.

Yang was featured in Asian Americans, a PBS documentary series on Asian American history, in 2020.

In 2021, he was among the co-founders of The Asian American Foundation, a $250 million initiative to address racism against Asian Americans and provide services to Asian Americans and Pacific Islanders. Yang sits on the board of the foundation, described by its organizers as the largest-ever philanthropic effort to support the AAPI community.

Yang and Yamakazi were among the awardees at the 2023 Asia Game Changer Awards.

== See also ==
- Joseph Tsai

Business positions
New office	Chief Yahoo; 1995–2007; Served alongside: David Filo	Succeeded by Susan Decker as President of Yahoo
Preceded by Terry Semel	Chief Executive Officer of Yahoo; 2007–2009	Succeeded by Carol Bartz as President and CEO of Yahoo
