= Qunar =

Chinese Travel Agency

Qunar.com
- Company type: Subsidiary
- Founded: May 2005; 21 years ago
- Headquarters: Beijing, {{{location_country}}}
- Area served: Worldwide
- Owner: Trip.com Group
- Founder: Zhuang Chenchao (庄辰超)
- Industry: Internet
- Services: Online travel agency Metasearch engine
- Website: www.qunar.com

Qunar.com is a Chinese online travel agency headquartered in Beijing. Qunar (Chinese: 去哪儿; pinyin: Qù nǎr) means "Where to go" in Chinese.

== History ==
The website was founded in May 2005.

In 2011, Baidu acquired a majority interest in the company for $306 million.

In November 2013, the company listed its shares on the NASDAQ.

In October 2015, Qunar merged with Ctrip and its backer Baidu Inc. Ctrip holds about 45% of Qunar and Baidu holds 25% of Ctrip.

In February 2017, the website was acquired by Ocean Management Holdings Limited (远洋管理有限公司), and underwent privatisation by de-listing from NASDAQ.

In October 2021, Qunar joined the Hongmeng ecosystem and launched online travel atomic services.

== Customer Service during COVID-19 ==
The complaint reached its highest point during the COVID-19 outbreak in China, when the Civil Aviation Administration of China (CAAC) issued a statement on its website on January 21, 2020, requiring airlines and travel agencies should handle their refund requests free of charge for passengers who have already purchased flight tickets to or from Wuhan, Hubei and wish to cancel their trip. Following the outbreak, many domestic airline and international airline cancelled their flights to/from or within China.

Since January 21, the number of customer calls to Qunar has surged and the highest peak is nearly 25 times of a typical day's handling capacity. Recently, the Qunar website has been frequently complained by customers that the refund has not been received for more than 40 days. As of April 4, 2020, the complaints totals 28,713 on Black Cat (黑猫, Hei Mao), a website by Sina for customers to file complaints, and nearly 9,650 complaint cases remain unsolved. Most of the customers complaints focus on the topic of Qunar is not following the airline's policy and refuse to refund or change the plane tickets. Some customer reported that request to refund are denied without a reason being told, and others reported that even if a refund is granted, Qunar cannot guarantee when the refund will arrive to their bank accounts.
