= Trip.com =

Online travel service corporation

- Website type: Subsidiary
- Available in: English, Chinese (Traditional), Japanese, Korean, Russian, German, French, Italian, Spanish, Dutch, Turkish, Polish, Greek, Indonesian, Malaysian and Thai, with the mobile app also featuring Vietnamese and Filipino
- Founded: June 1999; 27 years ago
- Headquarters: Singapore
- Area served: Worldwide
- Industry: Travel agency
- Employees: 45,000
- Parent: Trip.com Group
- Website: trip.com

Trip.com is an online travel agency headquartered in Singapore, owned by Trip.com Group. Its website and mobile app can be used to book flights, hotels, trains, rental cars, airport rides, tours, attraction tickets, eSIM cards, and more.

== History ==
Prior to its current ownership, the Trip.com domain name was used by Trip Software Systems from 1996 to 1998, Antoine Toffa from 1998 to 2000, Cendant from 2001 to 2003, Orbitz from 2009 to 2013, and Expedia from 2015 to 2016.

In 2016, Gogobot, a California travel booking and research company founded by entrepreneurs Travis Katz and Ori Zaltzman in 2010, acquired the Trip.com brand from Expedia and rebranded the service as Trip.com.

In November 2017, Ctrip acquired Trip.com. At that time, Trip.com had more than 60 million users.

In February 2018, Trip.com became the first travel agency to sell Korail tickets online.

In March 2018, Trip.com launched its car rentals service, spanning over 6,000 cities.

In June 2018, airport transfer bookings were launched on Trip.com's Hong Kong and English sites, initially covering more than 200 cities in 55 countries.

In July 2019, Trip.com expanded the reach of its car rental service in four major language markets.

In September 2019, Trip.com joined the Singapore Tourism Board in a strategic partnership for destination marketing.

In October 2019, Trip.com hosted its inaugural Airline Partner Conference, which brought together over 50 airlines.

In December 2019, the website reported 200% year-on-year growth in the car rentals product range for the winter holiday season.

In January 2020, Trip.com partnered with British Airways and Iberia on the New Distribution Capability (NDC) standard to offer a more complete inventory on the website.

In June 2021, Trip.com expanded its partnership with TripAdvisor.

In February 2023, Trip.com launched TripGen, an artificial intelligence-based chatbot based on OpenAI.

In June 2023, Trip.com launched Trekki, a non-fungible token.

== Awards ==
- 2024 Asia's Leading Online Travel Agency
- 2024 Contact Centre of the Year
- 2024 Global Support Services of the Year
- 2024 England's Leading Online Travel Agency
- 2024 Spain's Leading Online Travel Agency
- 2023 Europe's Leading Online Travel Agency
- 2023 England's Leading Online Travel Agency
- 2023 Spain's Leading Online Travel Agency
- 2022 Asia's Leading Online Travel Agency
- 2019 Google Material Design Award: Universality

== Controversies ==
In 2023, Trip.com stirred controversy by allowing women to book women-only sleeping car train compartments. Trip.com was accused of sex segregation and reversed the policy.
