= Jane Sun =

Chinese businesswoman

- 孙洁
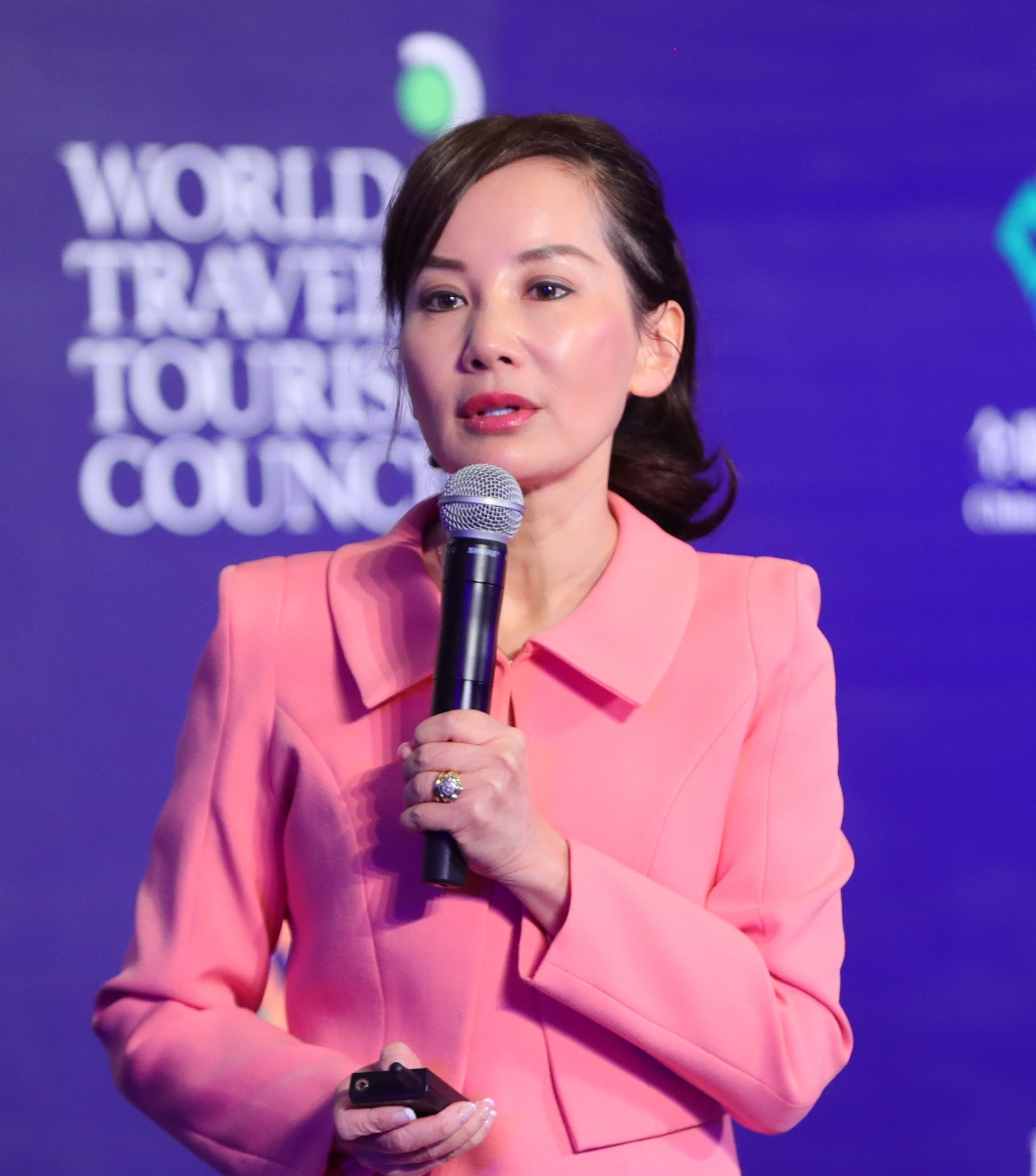
- Sun in 2019
- Born: 1969 or 1970 (age 56–57)
- Other names: Sun, Jie
- Education: University of Florida (BA); Peking University (LLM)
- Occupation: Businesswoman
- Title: CEO, Trip.com Group
- Term: November 2016-
- Predecessor: James Liang
- Board member of: Trip.com Group, IQIYI Inc
- Spouse: John Wu (吴炯)
- Children: 2

Jane Jie Sun (孙洁; Sūn Jié; born 1969/1970) is a Chinese businesswoman who has been the chief executive officer of Trip.com Group since November 2016.

== Education ==
Sun completed her first two years of undergraduate studies at Peking University. She transferred to the University of Florida and received a bachelor's degree in business upon her graduation. She later returned to Peking University and completed a master's degree in law from the Peking University Law School.

== Career ==
Sun worked for KPMG as an audit manager in Silicon Valley, California, for five years. Sun was the head of the SEC and external reporting division of Applied Materials from 1997 to 2005.

Sun joined Ctrip (now known as the Trip.com Group) in 2005 as CFO, rising to COO in May 2012, and CEO in November 2016, when she succeeded the company's founder James Liang.

== Personal life ==
In 1995, Sun married John Wu (吴炯), who graduated from the University of Michigan with a bachelor's degree in computer science and worked as one of Yahoo's earliest employees and as CTO of Alibaba from 2000 to 2008. Wu founded his own investment company, FengHe Fund Management (风和投资), in 2010. They live in Shanghai and have two children.
