= Susan Decker =

American businesswoman (born 1962)

Sue Decker
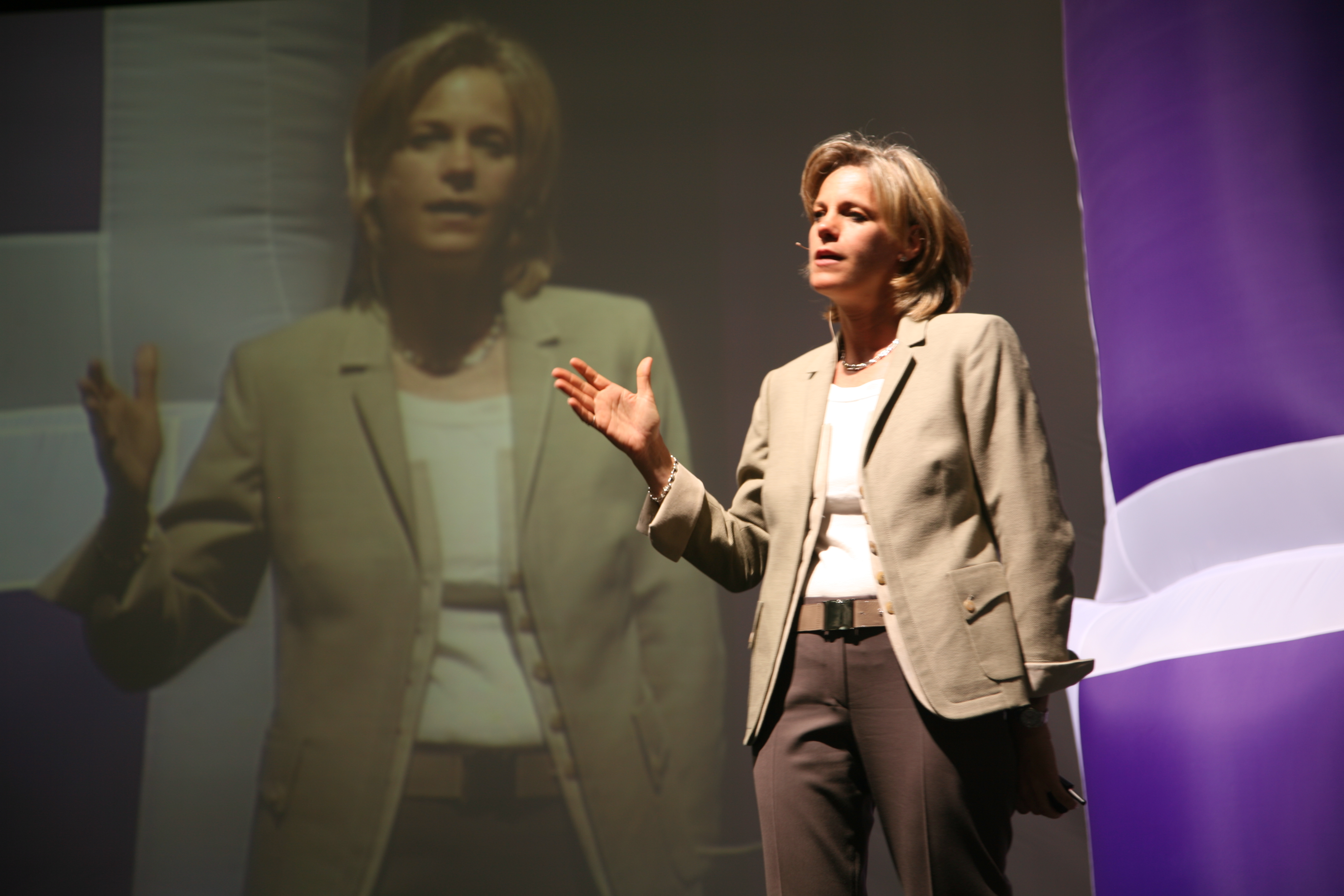
- Decker at a Yahoo all staff meeting, 2008
- Born: November 17, 1962 (age 63); Memphis, Tennessee, U.S.
- Education: Tufts University (BS); Harvard University (MBA)

Susan Lynne Decker (born November 17, 1962) is an American businesswoman. She was president of Yahoo! Inc in 2007 and 2008, leading the operations of the company while Jerry Yang was chief executive officer. In 2017, Decker co-founded a social networking platform called Raftr.

== Career ==
=== Investment Research ===
Decker received her Bachelor of Science degree in computer science and economics from Tufts University, and a Masters of Business Administration from Harvard Business School. She is also a Chartered Financial Analyst.

Prior to joining Yahoo, she worked at the U.S. investment bank Donaldson, Lufkin & Jenrette for 14 years. She spent 12 years as an equity research analyst, providing coverage to institutional investors on more than 30 media, publishing, and advertising stocks. In this capacity, she was listed by Institutional Investor magazine as a top rated analyst for ten consecutive years. She subsequently became the global director of equity research, a $300 million operation.

=== Yahoo! ===
Decker was the president of Yahoo! from 2007 to 2009. Prior to that, she was the chief financial officer and executive vice-president of finance and administration of Yahoo from 2000 to 2007. From 2006 to 2007 she was executive vice president of the Advertiser and Publisher Group in addition to her CFO responsibilities, where she led a consortium with the newspaper industry, and launched a display ad platform.

Decker was under consideration as CEO during Jerry Yang's CEO leadership, when the company was receiving a takeover offer from Microsoft. Decker drove a proposed search deal with Google as an alternative to a transaction with Microsoft, but this was rejected by the U.S. Justice Department as a breach of United States antitrust law. The company asked Yang to resign, and for the board to select an outside candidate for the CEO position. Decker announced her intention to resign from the company on January 13, 2009, following the appointment of Carol Bartz as CEO.

=== Post-Yahoo! directorships ===
Decker is on the boards of directors of Berkshire Hathaway, Costco, SurveyMonkey, Vail Resorts and Vox Media. She was on the board of directors of Pixar Animation Studios from June 2004 to May 2006, until its sale to The Walt Disney Company, and on the board of the Stanford Institute for Economic Policy Research from March 2005 to May 2007. She resigned from the board of Automattic in 2026. She was named a Trustee of Save The Children in March 2010.

In the fall of 2009, Decker became an Entrepreneur In Residence at the Harvard Business School, working with students in their own ventures and helping to develop and deliver the entrepreneurship-focused curriculum of the school's Immersion Experience Program.

== Other career ==
Decker founded Raftr, a communication and community building platform for universities in 2018. The app's name stems from the idea of the otter: "Otters travel in rafts — social groups of two to 100 that float together,” Decker said. “On Raftr, students can find others with common interests and get informed with what's happening on campus."

== Awards and recognition ==
On September 30, 2010, Decker received Harvard Business School's Alumni Achievement Award.

== Personal life ==
Decker grew up in Denver, Colorado. Decker is divorced, has three children, and lives in San Francisco, California.

Business positions
Preceded by David Filo; Jerry Yang as Chief Yahoo	President of Yahoo; 2007–2009	Succeeded by Carol Bartz as President and CEO of Yahoo
