= Golden Goose (company) =

Italian luxury fashion house

Golden Goose Group S.p.A.

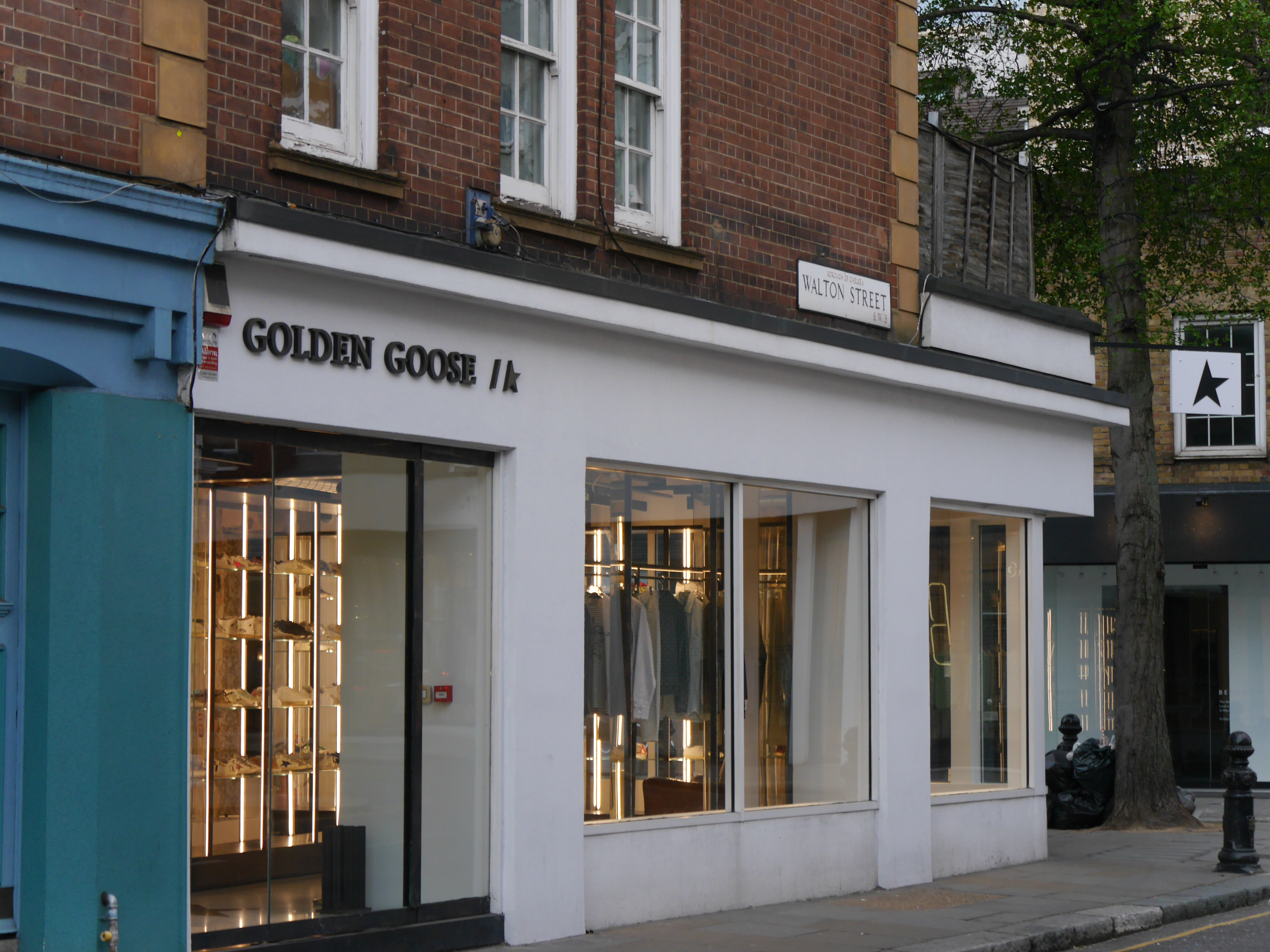
- A storefront in London, 2022.
- Type: Subsidiary
- Industry: Fashion
- Founded: 2000; 26 years ago in Marghera, Venice
- Founder: Alessandro Gallo; Francesca Rinaldo
- Headquarters: Milan, Italy
- Key people: Silvio Campara (CEO)
- Products: Luxury sneakers, apparel, leather goods, accessories
- Revenue: €654 million (2024)
- Net income: €52 million (2024)
- Owner: HSG (majority)
- Number of employees: 1,224 (2024)
- Website: www.goldengoose.com

Golden Goose (GG) is an Italian luxury fashion company specialized in footwear and apparel headquartered in Milan, Italy, by fashion designers Gallo and Rinaldo Founded in 2000 in Marghera near Venice, the brand is best known for its handcrafted sneakers with a distinctive distressed, vintage look. Its most recognizable model, the Super-Star, introduced in 2007, features a stylized star logo with one point deliberately shortened or obscured, reflecting the company's imperfect aesthetic.

== History ==
Golden Goose was founded in 2000 in the industrial district of Marghera near Venice. The brand initially focused on producing high fashion sneakers distinguished by handcrafted details and a deliberately worn appearance.

In 2007, Golden Goose introduced its Super-Star sneaker model, featuring the iconic star logo with one point intentionally reduced in length or partly concealed, which became a symbol of the brand.

In 2021, Golden Goose moved its corporate headquarters to Milan, Italy, while maintaining a creative and cultural presence in its original Marghera location through the opening of HAUS Marghera, an immersive space dedicated to craftsmanship and community.

The company reported approximately €500 million in annual sales in 2023, with footwear representing around 90% of total revenue.

Golden Goose planned an initial public offering (IPO) in June 2024, which was subsequently delayed due to market conditions.

== Ownership ==
In 2013, the Italian private equity fund DGPA SGR acquired a majority stake in the company in a transaction valued at approximately €45 million, with the founders retaining 25%. In 2015, Ergon Capital Partners III acquired 75% of the business in a deal estimated at €80 million.

In 2017, Golden Goose was acquired by the Carlyle Group for around €400 million. In 2020, Carlyle Group sold the company to Permira for €1.3 billion.

In 2022, Golden Goose purchased its main sneaker supplier, Italian Fashion Team.

In December 2025, a majority stake in the company was sold for approximately €2.5 billion to HSG, a Chinese venture capital and private equity firm, with Temasek and its subsidiary, True Light Capital, each acquiring minority stakes. Permira reportedly maintains a minority stake in the company.

== Subculture ==
Golden Goose is a major staple of Generation Z and zillennial fashion, particularly in the U.S. and Europe.

== See also ==
- Moncler
- Italian fashion
