= Traveloka =

Indonesian online travel platform

- Type: Private
- Industry: Travel; ticketing
- Founded: February 2012 in Jakarta, Indonesia
- Founders: Ferry Unardi; Albert; Derianto Kusuma
- Headquarters: Singapore; Jakarta (operations)
- Areas served: Indonesia; Singapore; Vietnam; Thailand; Malaysia; Philippines; Australia; Japan
- Key people: Ferry Unardi (co-founder and CEO); Albert (co-founder)
- Products: Online travel portal; ticket bookings; financial services
- Parent: Traveloka Holding Ltd

Traveloka is an online travel platform established in 2012 in Jakarta, Indonesia, and headquartered in Singapore. It operates in multiple countries, including Thailand, Malaysia, the Philippines, Vietnam, Australia, and Japan. Since its founding, the company has raised capital from various investors, including East Ventures, Global Founders Capital, GIC, the Qatar Investment Authority, and Expedia.

== History ==
=== Founding (2012–2013) ===
Traveloka was founded in February 2012 by three Indonesian software engineers: Ferry Unardi, Albert, and Derianto Kusuma, who met while studying and working in the United States. Motivated by the travel difficulties that Unardi frequently experienced when visiting Indonesia, they developed a platform to simplify travel logistics. Traveloka was initially launched as a travel metasearch site in September 2012, with Unardi as CEO and Kusuma as chief technology officer (CTO). The website became a full online travel agency in 2013, offering ticket reservations and multiple payment methods.

=== Expansion (2014–2019) ===
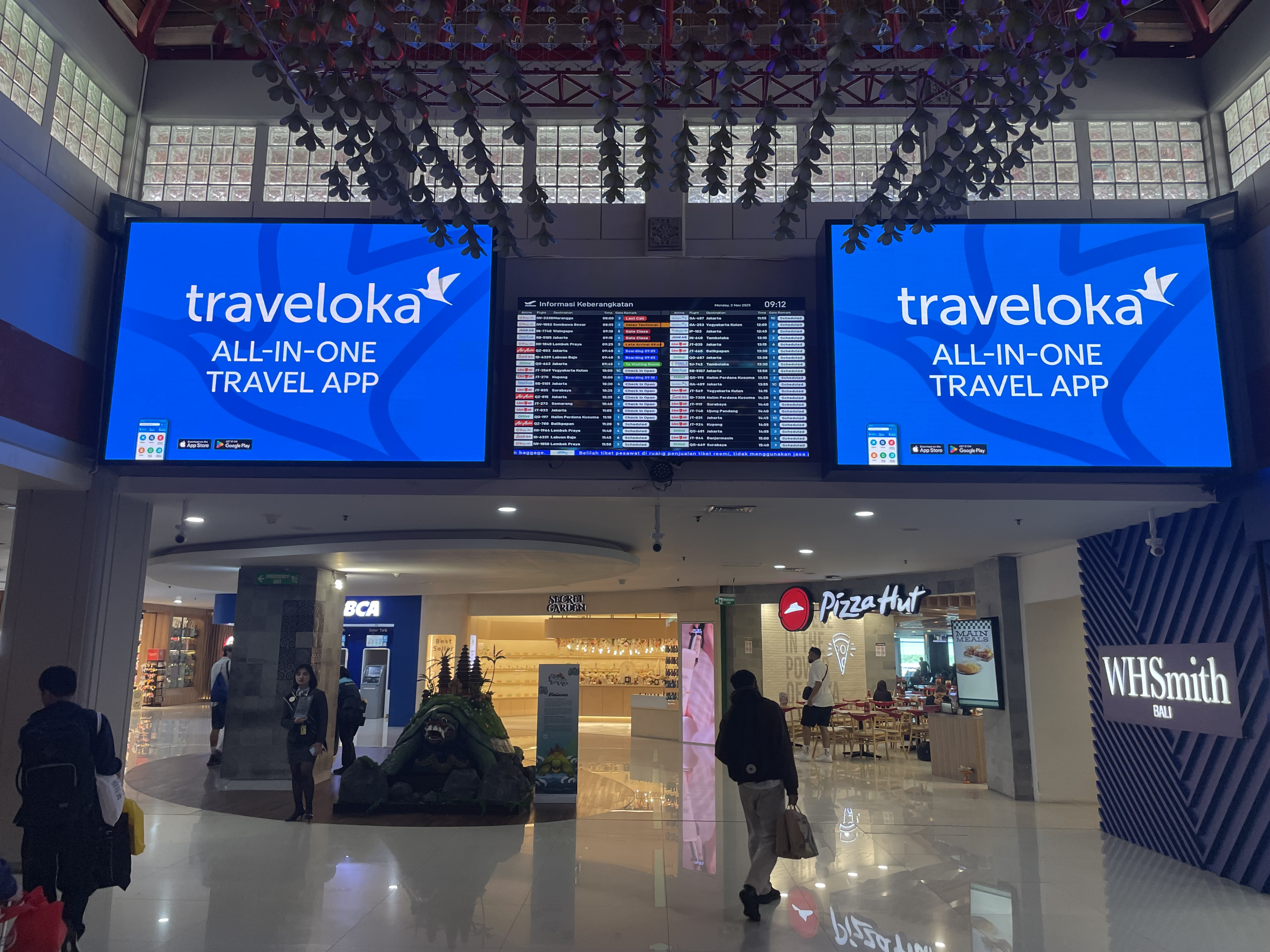
Traveloka advertisement at Ngurah Rai International Airport, Bali, Indonesia

In 2014, Traveloka introduced hotel bookings and launched apps for iOS and Android. By the end of the year, the platform reported ten million monthly visitors. In 2015, the US analytics firm comScore ranked Traveloka as Indonesia's number-one flight search and booking service. By 2016, the company had established offices in Singapore, Indonesia, Thailand, Malaysia, the Philippines, and Vietnam. During this time, the platform added new features, including train tickets, food services, and attraction bookings.

By 2017, Traveloka offered 100,000 accommodations and partnerships with around 100 airlines. New features such as online check-ins and airport transfer services were introduced. In 2017, an investment round valued Traveloka at over US$1 billion, making it a unicorn company. Kusuma resigned as CTO in 2018. In December 2018, the company acquired three online travel agencies, all former subsidiaries of the Japanese Recruit Holdings—for $67 million. By 2019, Traveloka was the largest online travel startup in Southeast Asia, alongside Gojek, Bukalapak, and Tokopedia. That year, a survey of 1,204 Indonesian millennials showed that 79% used Traveloka regularly.

In 2019, the company opened a research & development center in Bangalore, India. That year, the company also moved into financial services, introducing a credit card in partnership with Bank Rakyat Indonesia and Bank Mandiri and launching its PayLater card. Also in 2019, Traveloka debuted Traveloka Xperience, a platform for booking lifestyle activities, and a shariah-compliant health insurance program, alongside FWD Group, as well as other features. The company also began collaborating with government agencies and tourism boards, including the Singapore Tourism Board and the Indonesian Tourism Ministry, to promote regional travel and tourism.

=== COVID-19 pandemic (2020–2022) ===
The coronavirus pandemic in 2020 led to a surge in refund and rescheduling requests as well as substantial reimbursements. With flight bookings dropping to essentially zero due to travel restrictions, in April 2020, Traveloka laid off 100 staff members, and over the next half-year, refunded around 150,000 flight tickets equating to $100 million. In response to the situation at large, the company introduced flexible booking options, including its "Buy Now, Stay Later" option, bundling flights with COVID-19 tests, and expanding its "online experiences" with features such as cooking classes. It also launched the Traveloka Clean Partners campaign to align with government health and safety measures and facilitated vaccination bookings for over 600,000 people. Demand for travel accommodation was recovering by October 2020, according to Traveloka, and by the end of the year, the company's travel business had returned to profitability.

After reports in February 2021 that Traveloka was considering an SPAC merger in the United States, the company halted discussions of an initial public offering with Bridgetown Holdings in September 2021. In 2021, Fast Company named Traveloka one of its 100 Best Workplaces for Innovators in the international category. In January 2022, Traveloka was valued at $3 billion. The company streamlined its operations in 2022, discontinuing pandemic-specific ventures such as Traveloka Mart and Traveloka Eats.

=== Recent (2023-2025) ===
A 2023 PricewaterhouseCoopers study estimated that Traveloka had contributed USD10 billion in Gross Value Added to Indonesia's economy between 2019 and 2022. That included $4.5 billion from tourism, or 2.7% of the sector's GDP. In 2023, the company added a carbon offset option and a "sustainable tourism" filter to its app. Traveloka partnered with Disney Cruise Line in 2024, and by 2025, it had expanded operations into Australia and Japan. The app is regarded as functionally similar to Expedia.

== Funding ==
- In 2012, Traveloka raised an undisclosed amount of seed funding from East Ventures.
- In 2013, Global Founders Capital invested in Traveloka.
- In July 2017, Traveloka raised $350 million from Global Founders Capital, GIC, the Qatar Investment Authority, and Expedia, which also became a minority investor. Funds were earmarked for developing machine learning and artificial intelligence, investments, and hiring more staff.
- A funding round in 2020 was led by the Qatar Investment Authority.
- In 2022, the company raised USD300 million from a consortium of lenders. In April 2024, Bloomberg reported that Traveloka had used its own internal funds to repay the loan a year early.

== See also ==
- List of unicorn startup companies
- List of Indonesian inventions and discoveries
