= Douglas Leone =

American venture capitalist (born 1957)

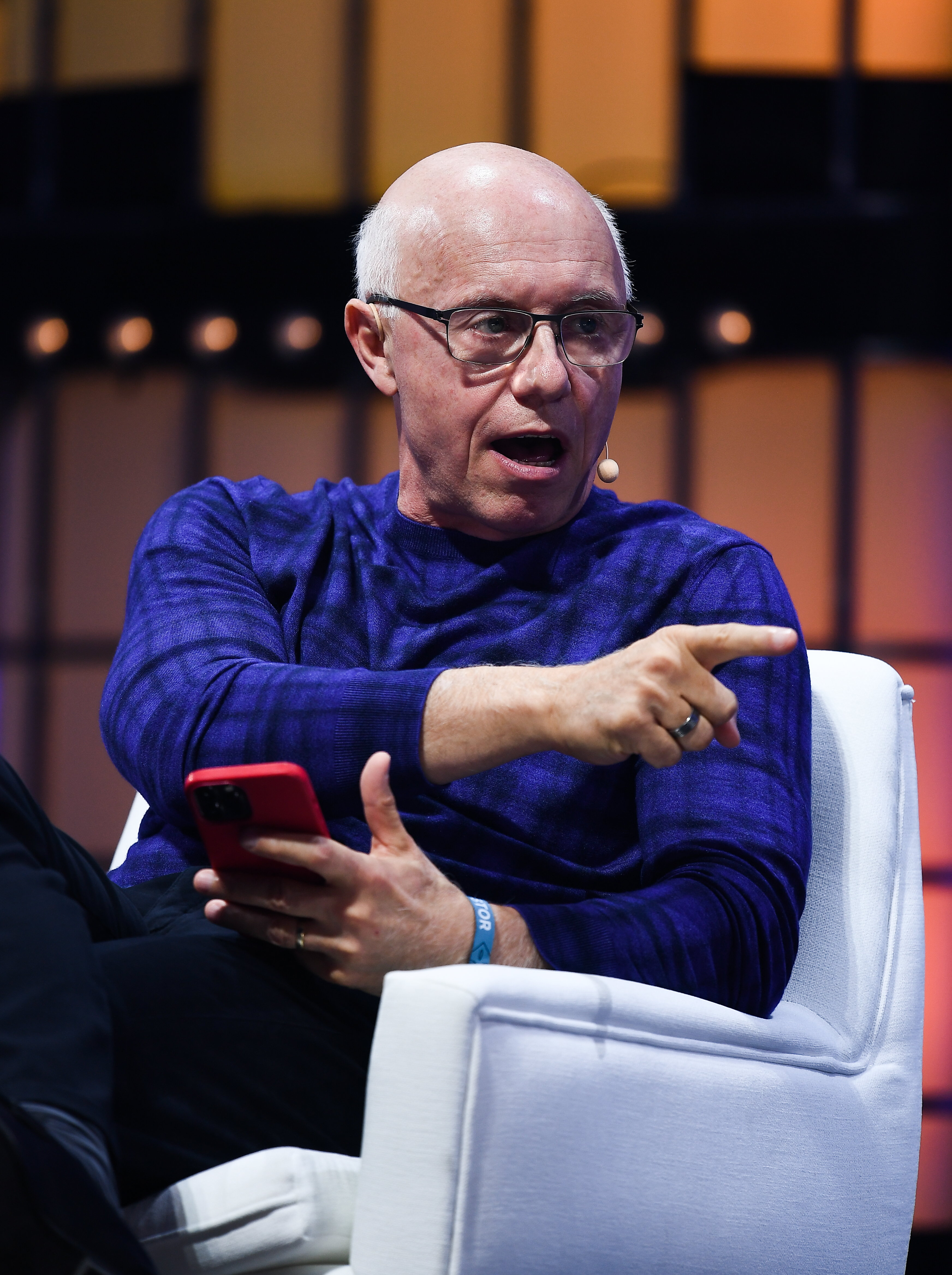
- Leone in 2021
- Born: July 4, 1957 (age 69); Genoa, Italy
- Education: Cornell University (BS); Columbia University (MS); Massachusetts Institute of Technology (MS)
- Employer: Sequoia Capital
- Spouse: Patricia Perkins-Leone
- Children: 4
- Awards: Officer of the Order of the Star of Italy

Douglas M. Leone (born July 4, 1957) is an American billionaire venture capitalist and the chairman of Sequoia Capital. As of October 2026, Forbes estimated his net worth at US$12.7 billion.

== Early life and education ==
Douglas Leone was born July 4, 1957, in Genoa, Italy. His family moved to the United States when Leone was 11 and settled in Mount Vernon, New York.

In 1979, Leone earned a bachelor's degree in mechanical engineering from Cornell University, and in 1986, a master's in industrial engineering from Columbia University's School of Engineering and Applied Science, and in 1988, a master's degree in management from the MIT Sloan School of Management as a Sloan Fellow.

== Career ==
Leone began his career in sales and management positions at Sun Microsystems, Hewlett-Packard, and Prime Computer. He joined Sequoia Capital in 1988, became a managing partner in 1996, and then the global managing partner in 2012.

Leone has been involved in Sequoia investments in numerous companies, including Aruba Networks, Hyperion/Arbor Software, International Network Services, Medallia, Netezza, PlanGrid, Rackspace, RingCentral, and ServiceNow. He also led Sequoia's international expansion into China and India.

In 2017, he was ranked #693 on Forbes list of the World's Billionaires, with a net worth of US$2.9 billion. In 2020, he was named on the Forbes Billionaires list with wealth of US$3.5 billion and ranked #538. His ranking on the list in 2022 was #350, with a net worth of US$6.9 billion.

Leone and his wife donated over $700,000 to support President Donald Trump's 2020 re-election campaign, and Leone was appointed to Trump's task force on re-opening the economy in the wake of the COVID-19 pandemic. The Washington Post reported that Leone proposed using his connections in the Trump Administration to help smooth the sale of TikTok (in which Sequoia had invested heavily) to a US corporation. Leone renounced his support for Trump following the 2021 storming of the United States Capitol.

In April 2022, Sequoia announced that Roelof Botha would replace Leone as its senior steward of global brand and operations, effective from July 5, 2022, following Leone's 65th birthday, and that Leone would continue to be a general partner in Sequoia's existing funds.

In March 2026, Sequoia named Leone chairman of the firm's board.

In May 2026, Forbes ranked Leone number one on its Midas All-Stars list, which recognized 15 venture capital investors who have appeared 15 or more times on the annual Forbes Midas List over its 25-year history. As of May 2026, Leone appeared on the list 21 times.

Leone is a backer of America PAC which supported the Donald Trump 2024 presidential campaign.

=== Boards ===
Leone is a board member for several companies, including Cresta, ActionIQ, Cyera, Island, Nubank, strongDM, Trade Republic, Whop, and Wiz.

== Personal life ==
Leone is married to Patricia Perkins-Leone. The couple has four children, and lives in Atherton, California. They have been seeking to build an oceanfront home in Makena, Maui, Hawaii, but as of November 2017, the Hawaii Supreme Court has ruled against the development.

In May 2021, Leone was conferred with the Order of the Star of Italy, in the class of Officer (Ufficiale dell'Ordine della Stella d'Italia).
