= Trip.com Group =

Chinese online travel service conglomerate

Trip.com Group Limited

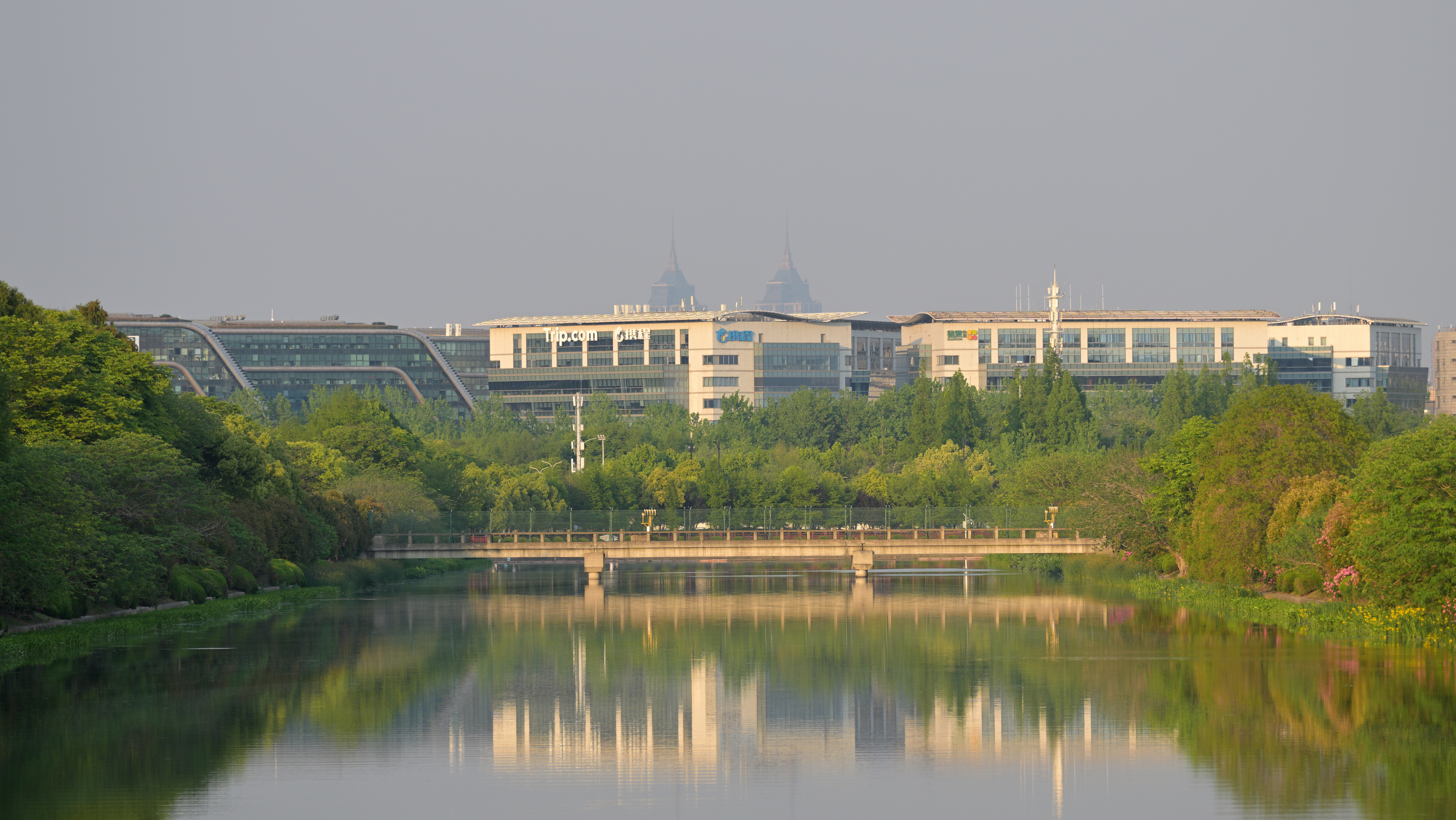
- Headquarters in Shanghai
- Formerly: Ctrip.com International, Ltd.
- Type: Public
- Traded as: Nasdaq: TCOM (ADS); SEHK: 9961
- Industry: Travel agency
- Founded: June 1999; 27 years ago
- Headquarters: Principal executive offices: Singapore; Administrative offices: Shanghai, China
- Area served: Worldwide
- Key people: James Liang (chairman); Jane Sun (CEO)
- Revenue: ▲US$8.925 billion (2025)
- Net income: ▲US$4.775 billion (2025)
- Total assets: ▲US$38.236 billion (2025)
- Total equity: ▲US$24.663 billion (2025)
- Number of employees: 43,574 (2025)
- Subsidiaries: Ctrip; Qunar; Trip.com; Skyscanner; Travix; TrainPal
- Website: group.trip.com

Trip.com Group
- Simplified Chinese: 携程集团
- Traditional Chinese: 攜程集團
- Literal meaning: carry journey group
Transcriptions
Standard Mandarin
- Hanyu Pinyin: Xiéchéng Jítuán
Yue: Cantonese
- Yale Romanization: Kwàihchìhng Jaahptyùhn

Trip.com Group Limited is a multinational travel agency headquartered in Shanghai, China. It was the largest online travel service in the world in 2017.

Founded in 1999, the company owns and operates several travel fare aggregators and travel fare metasearch engines, including namesake and flagship Trip.com, Skyscanner, Ctrip, Qunar, and Travix. It operates websites in approximately 40 languages and 200 countries. The company is ranked 820th on the Forbes Global 2000.

== History ==
The company was founded as Ctrip.com by James Liang, Neil Shen, Min Fan, and Qi Ji in June 1999.

The company was listed on the NASDAQ in 2003 through a variable interest entity (VIE) based in the Cayman Islands in a Merrill Lynch-led offering, raising US$75 million from the sale of 4.2 million American depositary receipts at $18 each. On its first day of trading, it appreciated 86% to close at $33.94 per ADR, after trading as high as $37.35. It was the first company since the November 2000 IPO of Transmeta to double its price in the first day of trading.

The company is a proponent of scientific management. In 2012, the company conducted a randomized control trial using 242 employees and sponsored by professors at Stanford University and Peking University. It found that employees randomly assigned to remote work for 9 months increased their output by 13.5% versus the office-based control group, and their turnover rates fell by almost 50%. The company then allowed remote work company-wide.

In August 2014, Priceline.com, announced that it would invest $500 million in the company to broaden the companies' options in China, and the companies, which had a commercial partnership since 2012, increased their cross-promotion of each company's hotel inventory and other travel services. The investment was increased by $250 million in May 2015.

In November 2016, the company acquired Skyscanner for £1.4 billion. That same month, Jane Sun became the CEO of Ctrip which she had joined in 2005.

On November 1, 2017, Ctrip acquired Trip.com, rebranding it as its global brand website. By 2018, Trip.com Group derived only around 2% of its revenue from overseas customers, and it announced plans to increase that share to roughly 20% within five years, using the Trip.com brand as the spearhead for international expansion. The strategy focused on growing in Asian markets such as South Korea and Japan, as well as in Western destinations like London, to better compete with global rivals like Expedia. Following the Trip.com relaunch, the platform was made available in multiple languages and had over six million users by mid-2018, with booking transactions doubling year-on-year.

In February 2018, Ctrip launched TrainPal, an online ticketing platform featuring split ticketing, in the United Kingdom. Accredited by the National Rail of the UK, TrainPal mainly provides services for the UK, and other European countries.

In September 2019, Ctrip completed a share exchange with Naspers and became the single largest shareholder of MakeMyTrip. As a result of the transaction, Ctrip acquired 49 percent of MakeMyTrip's voting power and began accounting for the company using the equity method.

In October 2019, shareholders approved the company's proposal to change its name from "Ctrip.com International, Ltd." to "Trip.com Group Limited." The company stated that the new name was intended to reflect its portfolio of travel brands—including Ctrip, Trip.com, Qunar, and Skyscanner—and to enhance recognition among international users. At the time of the rebranding, international business accounted for approximately 35 percent of the company's total revenue. The company projected that this figure could rise to between 40 and 50 percent over the following three to five years.

In 2021, Trip.com Group conducted another large-scale work-from-home experiment, this time comparing a hybrid schedule to full in-office work. Approximately 1,600 China-based employees were randomly assigned either to work in the office five days a week or to work on-site only three days per week (with remote work on other days) for a six-month trial. The experiment found no significant differences in employee productivity or promotions between the two groups, and the hybrid-work group actually showed a slight productivity increase along with about 35% lower attrition compared to the office-only group. After two years of follow-up, company management – initially skeptical – became supportive of implementing hybrid work permanently, citing improved employee satisfaction and substantial savings from the reduced staff turnover.

In April 2021, Trip.com Group was listed on the Hong Kong Stock Exchange.

In August 2024, Ctrip Asia Live Broadcast Center was unveiled in Thailand.

== Legal issues ==
In January 2026, the State Administration for Market Regulation (SAMR) conducted an unannounced on-site inspection at the company's headquarters in Shanghai, investigating the company for alleged abuse of its dominant market position in violation of the Anti-Monopoly Law of the People's Republic of China. The company allegedly engaged in predatory pricing, forced exclusivity ("choose one of two"), arbitrary commission hikes, and most-favored-nation (MFN) clauses that restrict merchants. As a result of the investigation, Min Fan resigned as president and director and Qi Ji resigned as director.
