= Yahoo! Inc. (1995–2017) =

American technology company

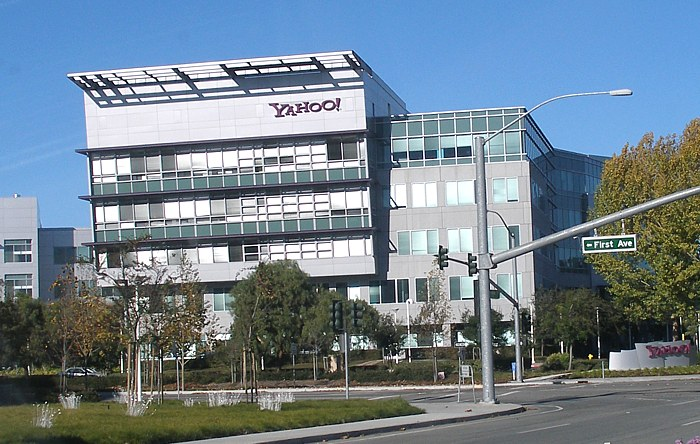
- Yahoo! headquarters in Sunnyvale, California
- Type: Public
- Traded as: Nasdaq: YHOO
- Industry: Internet; Computer software
- Founded: January 1994; 32 years ago (as Jerry and David's Guide to the World Wide Web); March 2, 1995; 31 years ago (as Yahoo!)
- Founders: Jerry Yang; David Filo
- Defunct: June 17, 2017; 9 years ago
- Fate: List: The company and most of its assets were sold to Verizon Communications, who merged it with AOL.; Non-internet assets spun off into a new company known as Altaba, which became defunct in 2019.; After merging with AOL, the current incarnation of Yahoo! Inc. was created.
- Successors: Altaba; the current incarnation of Yahoo! Inc.
- Headquarters: Sunnyvale, California, U.S.
- Area served: Worldwide
- Products: Yahoo! News; Yahoo! Mail; Yahoo! Finance; Yahoo! Sports; Yahoo! Search; Yahoo! Messenger; Yahoo! Answers; Tumblr; Flickr; See Yahoo products
- Revenue: ▲US$5.16 billion (2016)
- Operating income: ▲US$-645 million (2016)
- Net income: ▲US$-214 million (2016)
- Total assets: ▲US$48.08 billion (2016)
- Total equity: ▲US$31.04 billion (2016)
- Number of employees: 8,500 (2016)
- Subsidiaries: Yahoo subsidiaries
- Website: yahoo.com

Yahoo! Inc. was an American multinational technology company headquartered in Sunnyvale, California. Yahoo was founded by Jerry Yang and David Filo in January 1994 and was incorporated on March 2, 1995. Yahoo was one of the pioneers of the early internet era in the 1990s. Marissa Mayer, a former Google executive, was CEO and president of Yahoo from July 2012 until June 2017.

It was globally known for its Web portal, search engine Yahoo! Search, and related services, including Yahoo! Directory, Yahoo! Mail, Yahoo! News, Yahoo! Finance, Yahoo! Groups, Yahoo! Answers, advertising, online mapping, video sharing, fantasy sports, and its social media website. At its height, it was one of the most popular sites in the United States. According to third-party web analytics providers, Alexa and SimilarWeb, Yahoo! was the highest-read news and media website, with over seven billion views per month, being the sixth most visited website globally in 2016 According to news sources, roughly 700 million people visited Yahoo websites every month. Yahoo itself claimed it attracted "more than half a billion consumers every month in more than 30 languages".

Once the most popular website in the U.S., Yahoo slowly started to decline since the late 2000s, and on February 21, 2017, Verizon Communications announced its intent to acquire old Yahoo's internet business (excluding its stakes in Alibaba Group and Yahoo! Japan) for $4.48 billion—the company was once valued at over $100 billion. Before the transaction was completed, the company expected to change its name to Altaba Inc. Verizon completed its acquisition of the old iteration of Yahoo! Inc's internet business on June 13, 2017. Verizon announced that the old Yahoo! Inc's internet assets would be combined under a new subsidiary, Oath, which later became known as Verizon Media in 2019 and eventually renamed to the current iteration of Yahoo! Inc. in 2021.

== History ==
=== Founding ===
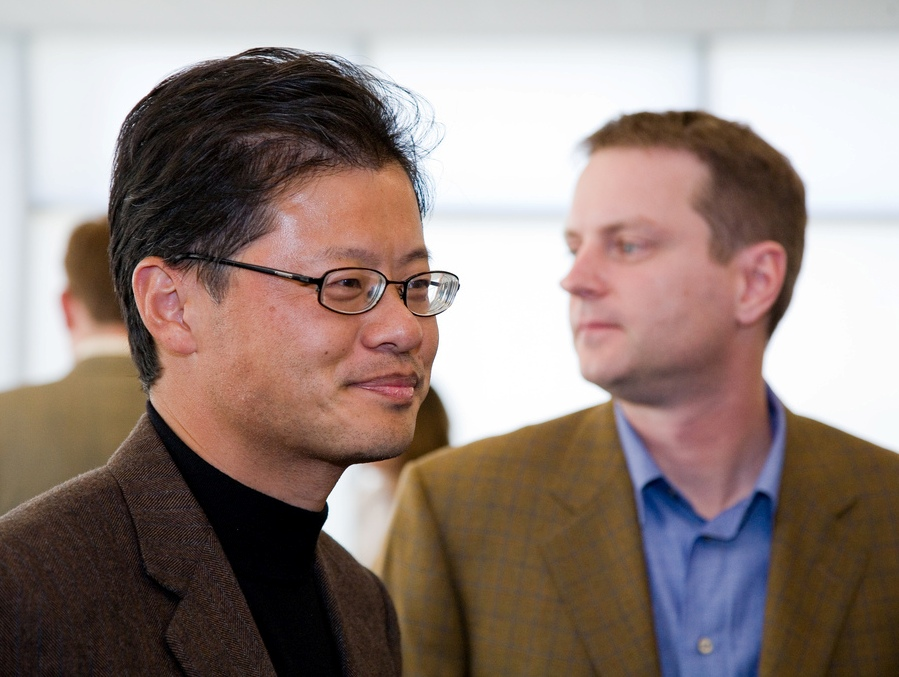
Jerry Yang and David Filo, the founders of Yahoo

In January 1994, Yang and Filo were electrical engineering graduate students at Stanford University, when they created a website named "Jerry and David's guide to the World Wide Web". The site was a directory of other websites, organized in a hierarchy, as opposed to a searchable index of pages. In March 1994, "Jerry and David's Guide to the World Wide Web" was renamed "Yahoo!", the human-edited Yahoo! Directory, provided for users to surf through the internet, being their first product and original purpose. The "yahoo.com" domain was created on January 18, 1995.

The word "yahoo" is a backronym for "Yet Another Hierarchically Organized Oracle" or "Yet Another Hierarchical Officious Oracle". The term "hierarchical" described how the Yahoo database was arranged in layers of subcategories. The term "oracle" was intended to mean "source of truth and wisdom", and the term "officious", rather than being related to the word's normal meaning, described the many office workers who would use the Yahoo database while surfing from work. However, Filo and Yang insist they mainly selected the name because they liked the slang definition of a "yahoo" (used by college students in David Filo's native Louisiana in the late 1980s and early 1990s to refer to an unsophisticated, rural Southerner): "rude, unsophisticated, uncouth." This meaning derives from the Yahoo race of fictional beings from Gulliver's Travels.

=== Expansion ===
Yahoo grew rapidly throughout the 1990s. Like many search engines and web directories, Yahoo added a web portal. By 1998, Yahoo was the most popular starting point for web users and the human-edited Yahoo Directory the most popular search engine. It also made many high-profile acquisitions.

Yahoo!'s initial public offering at the NASDAQ was on April 12, 1996, closing at US$33.00—up 270 percent from the IPO price—after peaking at $43.00 for the day. Its stock price skyrocketed during the dot-com bubble, closing at an all-time high of $118.75 a share on January 3, 2000. However, after the dot-com bubble burst, it reached a post-bubble low of $8.11 on September 26, 2001.

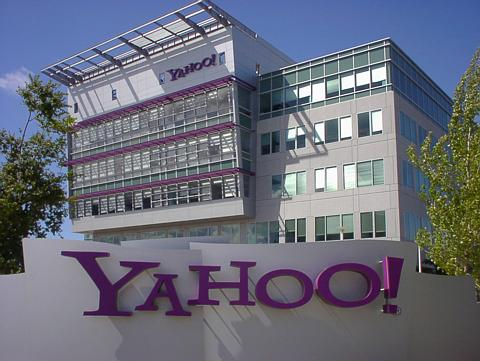
Yahoo headquarters in 2001

Yahoo began using Google for search in 2000. Over the next four years, it developed its own search technologies, which it began using in 2004. In response to Google's Gmail, Yahoo began to offer unlimited email storage in 2007. The company struggled through 2008, with several large layoffs.

In February 2008, Microsoft made an unsolicited bid to acquire Yahoo for $44.6 billion. Yahoo formally rejected the bid, claiming that it "substantially undervalues" the company and was not in the interest of its shareholders. Three years later, Yahoo had a market capitalization of $22.24 billion. Carol Bartz replaced Yang as CEO in January 2009. In September 2011, she was removed from her position at Yahoo by the company's chairman Roy Bostock, and CFO Tim Morse was named as Interim CEO of the company.

In early 2012, after the appointment of Scott Thompson as CEO, rumors began to spread about looming layoffs. Several key executives, such as Chief Product Officer Blake Irving, left. On April 4, 2012, Yahoo announced a cut of 2,000 jobs or about 14 percent of its 14,100 workers. The cut was expected to save around $375 million annually after the layoffs were completed at end of 2012. In an email sent to employees in April 2012, Thompson reiterated his view that customers should come first at Yahoo. He also completely reorganized the company.

On May 13, 2012, Yahoo issued a press release stating that Thompson was no longer with the company, and would immediately be replaced on an interim basis by Ross Levinsohn, recently appointed head of Yahoo's new Media group. Thompson's total compensation for his 130-day tenure with Yahoo was at least $7.3 million.

On July 16, 2012, Marissa Mayer was appointed president and CEO of Yahoo, effective the following day.

On May 19, 2013, the Yahoo board approved a $1.1 billion purchase of blogging site Tumblr. Tumblr's CEO and founder David Karp would remain a large shareholder. The announcement reportedly signified a changing trend in the technology industry, as large corporations like Yahoo, Facebook, and Google acquired start-up Internet companies that generated low amounts of revenue as a way in which to connect with sizeable, fast-growing online communities. The Wall Street Journal stated that the purchase of Tumblr would satisfy Yahoo's need for "a thriving social-networking and communications hub." On May 20, the company announced the acquisition of Tumblr officially. The company also announced plans to open a San Francisco office in July 2013.

On August 2, 2013, Yahoo acquired Rockmelt; its staff was retained, but all of its existing products were terminated.

Data collated by comScore during July 2013, revealed that more people in the U.S. visited Yahoo websites during the month in comparison to Google; the occasion was the first time that Yahoo outperformed Google since 2011. The data did not count mobile usage, nor Tumblr.

In November 2014, Yahoo! announced that it would acquire the video advertising provider BrightRoll for $640 million.

On November 21, 2014, it was announced that Yahoo had acquired Cooliris.

=== Decline, security breaches, Verizon purchase ===
By the fourth quarter of 2013, the company's share price had more than doubled since Marissa Mayer took over as president in July 2012; however, the share price peaked at about $35 in November 2013. It did go up to $36.04 in the mid afternoon of December 2, 2015, perhaps on news that the board of directors was meeting to decide on the future of Mayer, whether to sell the struggling internet business, and whether to continue with the spinoff of its stake in China's Alibaba e-commerce site. Not all had gone well during Mayer's tenure, including the $1.1 billion acquisition of Tumblr that had yet to prove beneficial and the forays into original video content that led to a $42 million write-down. Sydney Finkelstein, a professor at Dartmouth College's Tuck School of Business, told The Washington Post that sometimes, "the single best thing you can do ... is sell the company." The closing price of Yahoo! Inc. on December 7, 2015, was $34.68.

The Wall Street Journal's Douglas MacMillan reported on February 2, 2016, that Yahoo's CEO Marissa Mayer was expected to cut 15% of its workforce.

On July 25, 2016, Verizon Communications announced that it had agreed to purchase Yahoo's core internet business for $4.83 billion. Those assets were merged with AOL to form a new entity known as Oath; Yahoo, AOL, and Huffington Post continued to operate under their own names, under the Oath umbrella. The deal excluded Yahoo's 15% stake in Alibaba Group and 35.5% stake in Yahoo! Japan, which were retained under the name Altaba, with a new executive team.

On September 22, 2016, Yahoo disclosed a data breach that occurred in late 2014, in which information associated with at least 500 million user accounts, one of the largest breaches reported to date. The United States have indicted four men, including two employees of Russia's Federal Security Service (FSB), for their involvement in the hack. On December 14, 2016, the company revealed that another separate data breach had occurred in 2014, with hackers obtaining sensitive account information, including security questions, to at least one billion accounts. The company stated that hackers had utilized stolen internal software to "forge" cookies.

In response to these breaches, Bloomberg News reported that Verizon was attempting to re-negotiate the deal to reduce the purchase price by $250 million, causing a 2% increase in Yahoo stock prices. On February 21, 2017, Verizon agreed to lower its purchase price for Yahoo! by $350 million, and share liabilities regarding the investigation into the data breaches.

On June 8, 2017, Yahoo shareholders approved the company's sale of some of its Internet assets to Verizon for $4.48 billion. The deal officially closed on June 13, 2017.

== Products and services ==
Yahoo operated a portal that provides the latest news, entertainment, and sports information. The portal also gave users access to other Yahoo services like Yahoo! Search, Yahoo Mail, Yahoo Maps, Yahoo Finance, Yahoo Groups and Yahoo Messenger.

=== Communication ===
Yahoo provided Internet communication services such as Yahoo Messenger and Yahoo Mail. As of May 2007, its e-mail service would offer unlimited storage.

Yahoo provided social networking services and user-generated content, including products such as My Web, Yahoo Personals, Yahoo 360°, Delicious, Flickr, and Yahoo Buzz. Yahoo closed Yahoo Buzz, MyBlogLog, and numerous other products on April 21, 2011.

Yahoo Photos was closed on September 20, 2007, in favor of Flickr. On October 16, 2007, Yahoo announced that it would discontinue Yahoo 360°, including bug repairs; the company explained that in 2008 it would instead establish a "universal profile" similar to the Yahoo Mash experimental system.

=== Content ===
Yahoo partners with numerous content providers in products such as Yahoo Sports, Yahoo Finance, Yahoo Music, Yahoo Movies, Yahoo Weather, Yahoo News, Yahoo! Answers and Yahoo Games to provide news and related content. Yahoo provides a personalization service, My Yahoo, which enables users to combine their favorite Yahoo features, content feeds and information onto a single page.

On March 31, 2008, Yahoo launched Shine, a site tailored for women seeking online information and advice between the ages of 25 and 54.

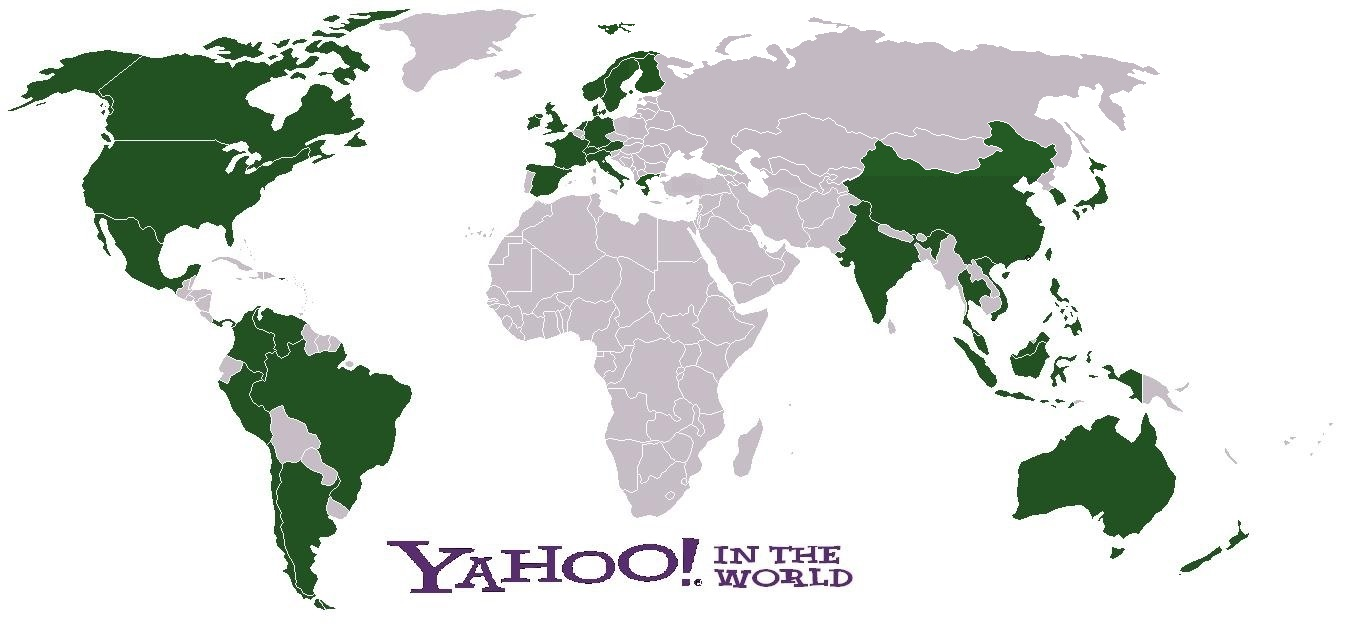
Map showing localized versions of Yahoo! web portals, as of 2008

=== Co-branded Internet services ===
Yahoo developed partnerships with broadband providers such as AT&T Inc. (via Prodigy, BellSouth & SBC), Verizon Communications, Rogers Communications, and British Telecom, offering a range of free and premium Yahoo content and services to subscribers.

=== Mobile services ===
Yahoo Mobile offers services for email, instant messaging, and mobile blogging, as well as information services, searches and alerts. Services for the camera phone include entertainment and ring tones.

Yahoo introduced its Internet search system, called OneSearch, for mobile phones on March 20, 2007. The results include news headlines, images from Flickr, business listings, local weather and links to other sites. Instead of showing only, for example, popular movies or some critical reviews, OneSearch lists local theaters that at the moment are playing the movie, along with user ratings and news headlines regarding the movie. A zip code or city name is required for OneSearch to start delivering local search results.

The results of a Web search are listed on a single page and are prioritized into categories.

As of 2012, Yahoo used Novarra's mobile content transcoding service for OneSearch.

On October 8, 2010, Yahoo announced plans to bring video chat to mobile phones via Yahoo Messenger.

=== Commerce ===
Yahoo offers shopping services such as Yahoo! Shopping, Yahoo Autos, Yahoo Real Estate and Yahoo Travel, which enables users to gather relevant information and make commercial transactions and purchases online. Yahoo Auctions were discontinued in 2007 except for Asia. Yahoo Shopping is a price comparison service which uses the Kelkoo price comparison service it acquired in April 2004.

=== Small business ===
Yahoo provides business services such as Yahoo DomainKeys, Yahoo Web Hosting, Yahoo Merchant Solutions, Yahoo Business Email and Yahoo Store to small business owners and professionals allowing them to build their own online stores using Yahoo's tools.

=== Advertising ===
Yahoo Search Marketing provides services such as Sponsored Search, Local Advertising and Product/Travel/Directory Submit that let different businesses advertise their products and services on the Yahoo network.

Following the closure of a "beta" version on April 30, 2010, the Yahoo Publisher Network was re-launched as an advertising tool that allows online publishers to monetize their websites through the use of site-relevant advertisements.

Yahoo launched its new Internet advertisement sales system on February 5, 2007, called Panama. It allows advertisers to bid for search terms to trigger their ads on search results pages. The system considers bids, ad quality, clickthrough rates and other factors in ranking ads. Through Panama, Yahoo aims to provide more relevant search results to users, a better overall experience, and to increase monetization.

On April 7, 2008, Yahoo announced APT from Yahoo, which was originally called AMP from Yahoo, an online advertising management platform. The platform simplifies advertising sales by unifying buyer and seller markets. The service was launched in September 2008.

In September 2011, Yahoo formed an ad selling strategic partnership with 2 of its top competitors, AOL and Microsoft. But by 2013, this was found to be underperforming in market share and revenue, as Microsoft simply skimmed off four percent of the search market from Yahoo, without growing their combined share.

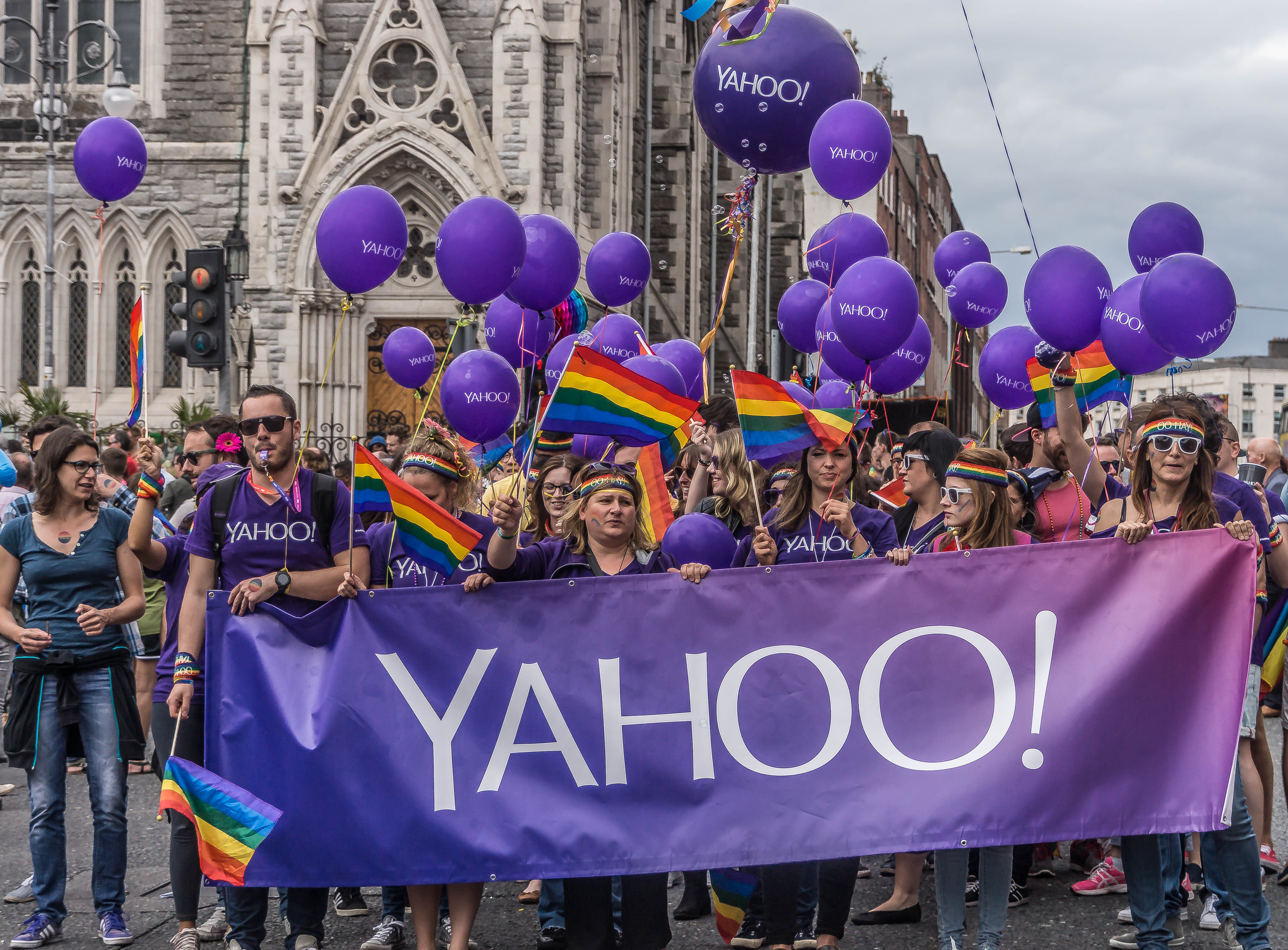
The 2015 Dublin LGBTQ Pride Festival, sponsored by Yahoo

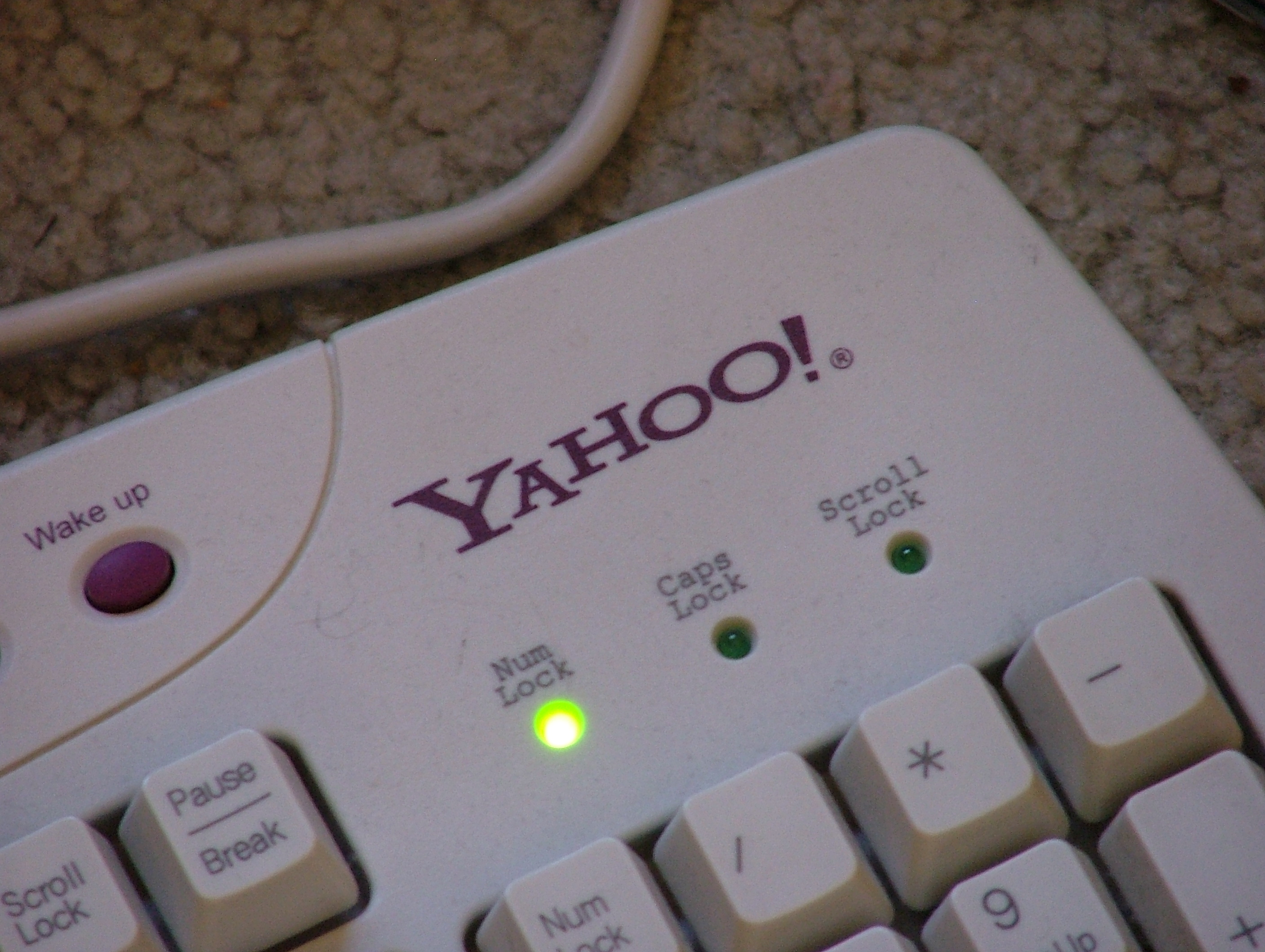
A Yahoo!-branded PC keyboard

On September 27, 2023, Yahoo partnered with Good-Loop to offer carbon neutral private marketplace (PMP) media opportunities to help advertisers be more sustainable.

=== GeoPlanet ===
Yahoo offers cartographic and geographic services via GeoPlanet.

=== Yahoo Next ===
Yahoo Next is an incubation ground for future Yahoo technologies currently undergoing testing. It contains forums for Yahoo users to give feedback to assist in the development of these future Yahoo technologies.

=== Yahoo BOSS ===
Yahoo Search BOSS is a service that allows developers to build search applications based on Yahoo's search technology. Early Partners in the program include Hakia, Me.dium, Delver, Daylife and Yebol.

In early 2011, the program switched to a paid model using a cost-per-query model from $0.40 to $0.75 CPM (cost per 1000 BOSS queries). The price, as Yahoo explained, depends on whether the query is of web, image, news or other information.

=== Yahoo Meme ===
Yahoo Meme is a beta social service, similar to the popular social networking sites Twitter and Jaiku.

=== Y!Connect ===
Y!Connect enables individuals to leave comments in online publication boards by using their Yahoo ID, instead of having to register with individual publications. The Wall Street Journal reported that Yahoo plans to mimic this strategy used by rival Facebook Inc. to help drive traffic to its site.

=== Yahoo Accessibility ===
Yahoo has invested resources to increase and improve access to the Internet for the disabled community through the Yahoo Accessibility Lab.

=== Yahoo Axis ===
Yahoo Axis is a desktop web browser extension and mobile browser for iOS devices created and developed by Yahoo. The browser made its public debut on May 23, 2012. A copy of the private key used to sign official Yahoo browser extensions for Google Chrome was accidentally leaked in the first public release of the Chrome extension.

=== Yahoo SearchMonkey ===
Yahoo SearchMonkey (often misspelled Search Monkey) was a Yahoo service which allowed developers and site owners to use structured data to make Yahoo Search results more useful and visually appealing, and drive more relevant traffic to their sites. The service was shut down in October 2010 along with other Yahoo services as part of the Microsoft and Yahoo search deal. The name SearchMonkey is an homage to Greasemonkey. Officially the product name has no space and two capital letters.

Yahoo SearchMonkey was selected as one of the top 10 Semantic Web Products of 2008.

=== Defunct services ===
GeoCities was a popular web hosting service founded in 1995 and was one of the first services to offer web pages to the public. At one point it was the third-most-browsed site on the World Wide Web. Yahoo purchased GeoCities in 1999 and ten years later the web host was closed, deleting some seven million web pages. A great deal of information was lost but many of those sites and pages were mirrored at the Internet Archive, OOcities.com, and other such databases.

Yahoo Go, a Java-based phone application with access to most of Yahoo services, was closed on January 12, 2010.

Yahoo 360° was a blogging/social networking beta service launched in March 2005 by Yahoo and closed on July 13, 2009. Yahoo Mash beta was another social service closed after one year of operation prior to leaving beta status.

Yahoo Photos was shut down on September 20, 2007, in favor of integration with Flickr. Yahoo Tech was a website that provided product information and setup advice to users. Yahoo launched the website in May 2006. On March 11, 2010, Yahoo closed down the service and redirected users to Yahoo's technology news section. Other discontinued services include Farechase, My Web, Audio Search, Pets, Live, Kickstart, Briefcase, and Yahoo for Teachers.

Hotjobs was acquired by and merged with Monster.com.

Yahoo Koprol was an Indonesian geo-tagging website that allowed users to share information about locations without the use of a GPS device. Koprol was acquired by Yahoo a year following its inception and, in 2011, 1.5 million people were utilizing the website, with users also based in Singapore, the Philippines and Vietnam. However, eighty percent of users were Indonesian. Yahoo officially discontinued Koprol on August 28, 2012, because it did "not meaningfully drive revenue or engagement".

Yahoo Mail Classic was announced as to be shut down in April 2013. Yahoo made a notice that, starting in June 2013, Mail Classic and other old versions of Yahoo Mail will be shut down. All users of Mail Classic are expected to switch to the new Yahoo Mail, use IMAP, or switch to another email service. In addition, April 2013 brought the closure of Upcoming, Yahoo Deals, Yahoo SMS Alerts, Yahoo Kids, Yahoo Mail and Messenger feature phone (J2ME).

In early July 2013, Yahoo announced the scheduled closure of the task management service Astrid. Yahoo had acquired the company in May 2013 and was to discontinue the service on August 5, 2013. The team at Astrid has supplied its customers with a data export tool and recommended former competitors such as Wunderlist and Sandglaz.

==== Twitter slide leak on changes to Yahoo ====
On December 15, 2010, one day after Yahoo announced layoffs of 4% of its workers across their portfolio, MyBlogLog founder Eric Marcoullier posted a slide from a Yahoo employee on Twitter. The slide was visible during an employee-only strategy webcast indicating changes in Yahoo's offerings.

The following services were in a column under "Sunset": Yahoo Picks, AltaVista, MyM, AlltheWeb, Yahoo Bookmarks, Yahoo Buzz, del.icio.us, and MyBlogLog. Under the "Merge" column were: Upcoming, FoxyTunes, Yahoo Events, Yahoo People Search, Sideline, and FireEagle.

11 other properties were listed that Yahoo was interested in developing into feature sites within the portal to take the place of the "Sunset" and "Merge" vacancies, including the prior feature services (before the new Yahoo Mail was launched), were Yahoo Address Book, Calendar, and Notepad. Despite Notepad being listed as a feature service instead of sunset or merge in 2010, Yahoo has since taken steps to de-emphasize Notepad. For example, in January 2013, Notepad was no longer linked within the new Yahoo mail service, although it continued to be linked in the older Classic version. Also, starting in mid- to late January 2013, Notepad was no longer searchable.

The blog on the del.icio.us website released a post by Chris Yeh after the slide was leaked in which Yeh stated that "Sunset" doesn't necessarily mean that Yahoo is closing down the site. Yeh further explained that other possibilities—including del.icio.us leaving Yahoo (through sale or spinoff)—were still being considered: "We can only imagine how upsetting the news coverage over the past 24 hours has been to many of you. Speaking for our team, we were very disappointed by the way that this appeared in the press." On April 27, 2011, Yahoo's sale of del.icio.us to Avos was announced.

Yahoo Buzz was closed down on April 21, 2011, without an official announcement from Yahoo. MyBlogLog was then discontinued by Yahoo on May 24, 2011.

== Privacy ==
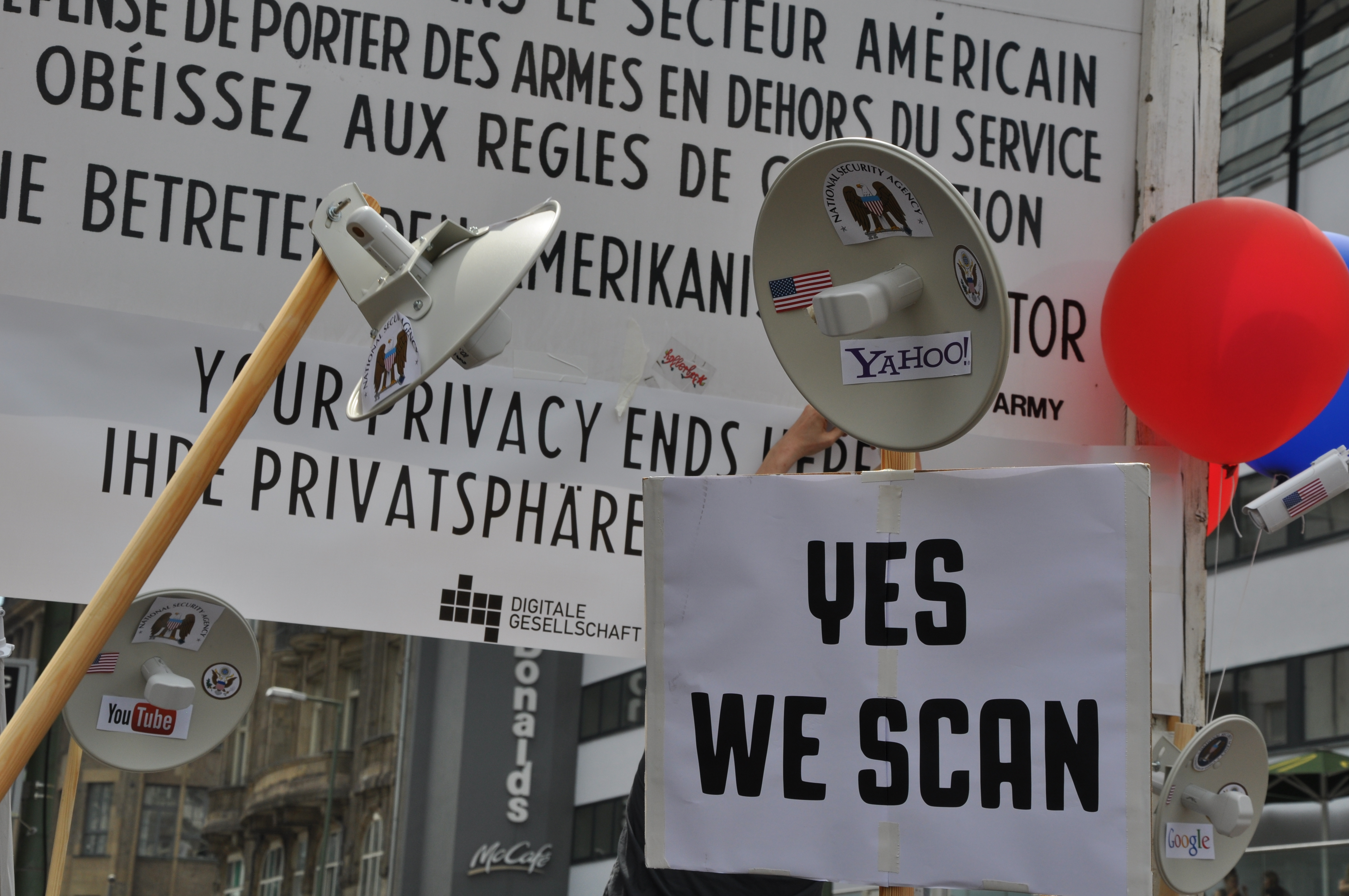
Protest against the mass surveillance by the NSA

In September 2013, Yahoo's transparency report said the company received 29 thousand requests for information about users from governments in the first six months of 2013. Over 12 thousand of the requests came from the United States.

In October 2013, The Washington Post reported that the U.S. National Security Agency intercepted communications between Yahoo's data centers, as part of a program named Muscular.

In late January 2014, Yahoo announced on its company blog that it had detected a "coordinated effort" to hack into possibly millions of Yahoo Mail accounts. The company prompted users to reset their passwords, but did not elaborate on the scope of the possible breach, citing an ongoing federal investigation.

=== Storing personal information and tracking usage ===
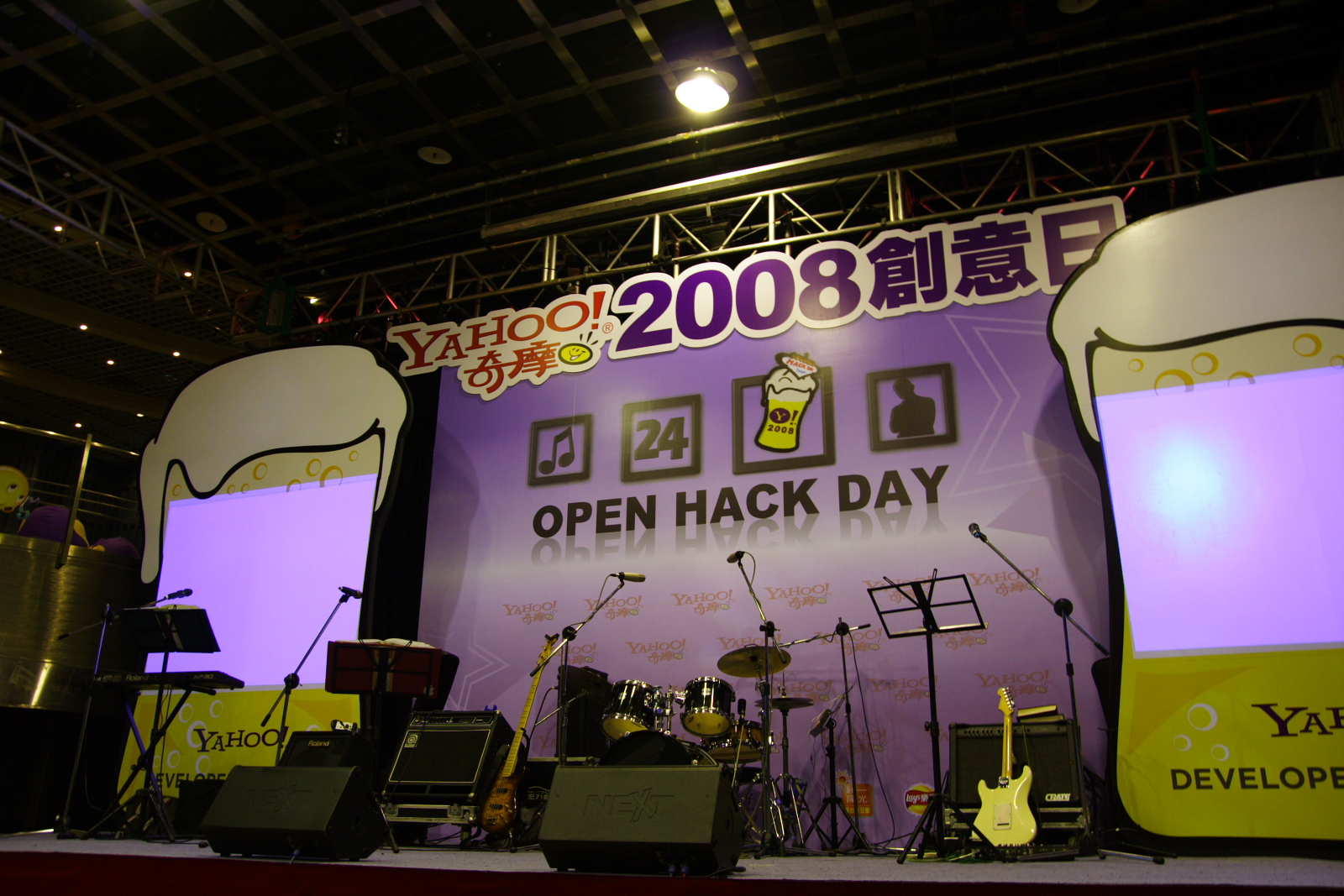
Yahoo! Kimo (Taiwan) Open Hack Day event in 2008

Working with comScore, The New York Times found that Yahoo was able to collect far more data about users than its competitors from its Web sites and advertising network. By one measure, on average Yahoo had the potential in December 2007 to build a profile of 2,500 records per month about each of its visitors. Yahoo retains search requests for a period of 13 months. However, in response to European regulators, Yahoo obfuscates the IP address of users after three months by deleting its last eight bits.

On March 29, 2012, Yahoo announced that it would introduce a "Do Not Track" feature that summer, allowing users to opt out of Web-visit tracking and customized advertisements. However, on April 30, 2014, Yahoo announced that it would no longer support the "Do Not Track" browser setting.

According to a 2008 article in Computerworld, Yahoo has a 2-petabyte, specially built data warehouse that it uses to analyze the behavior of its half-billion Web visitors per month, processing 24 billion daily events. In contrast, the United States Internal Revenue Service (IRS) database of all United States taxpayers weighs in at only 150 terabytes.

In September 2016, it was reported that data from at least 500 million Yahoo accounts was stolen in 2014.

In October 2016, Reuters reported that in 2015, Yahoo! created a software to search their customers e-mail at the request of NSA or FBI.

== Criticism ==
In 2000, Yahoo was taken to court in France by parties seeking to prevent French citizens from purchasing memorabilia relating to the Nazi Party. In March 2004, Yahoo launched a paid inclusion program whereby commercial websites were guaranteed listings on the Yahoo search engine. Yahoo discontinued the program at the end of 2009. Yahoo was criticized for providing ads via the Yahoo ad network to companies who display them through spyware and adware.

Yahoo, as well as other search engines, cooperated with the Chinese government in censoring search results. In April 2005, dissident Shi Tao was sentenced to 10 years in prison for "providing state secrets to foreign entities" as a result of being identified by IP address by Yahoo. Human rights organizations and the company's general counsel disputed the extent of Yahoo's foreknowledge of Shi's fate. Human rights groups also accuse Yahoo of aiding authorities in the arrest of dissidents Li Zhi and Jiang Lijun. In April 2017, Yahoo was sued for failing to uphold settlement agreements in this case. Yahoo pledged to give support to the families of those arrested and create a relief fund for those persecuted for expressing their views online with Yahoo Human Rights Trust. Of the $17.3 million allotted to this fund, $13 million had been used for a townhouse in Washington, D.C., and other purchases.

In September 2003, dissident Wang Xiaoning was convicted of charges of "incitement to subvert state power" and was sentenced to ten years in prison. Yahoo Hong Kong connected Wang's group to a specific Yahoo e-mail address. Both Xiaoning's wife and the World Organization for Human Rights sued Yahoo under human rights laws on behalf of Wang and Shi.

As a result of media scrutiny relating to Internet child predators and a lack of significant ad revenues, Yahoo's "user created" chatrooms were closed down in June 2005. On May 25, 2006, Yahoo's image search was criticized for bringing up sexually explicit images even when SafeSearch was active. Yahoo was a 40% (24% in September 2013) owner of Alibaba Group, which was a subject of controversy for allowing the sale of shark-derived products. The company banned the sale of shark fin products on all its e-commerce platforms effective January 1, 2009. On November 30, 2009, Yahoo was criticized by the Electronic Frontier Foundation for sending a DMCA notice to whistle-blower website "Cryptome" for publicly posting details, prices, and procedures on obtaining private information pertaining to Yahoo's subscribers.

After some concerns over censorship of private emails regarding a website affiliated with Occupy Wall Street protests were raised, Yahoo responded with an apology and explained it as an accident.

=== Allegations of sexism against men ===
Scott Ard, a prominent editorial director, fired from Yahoo in 2015 has filed a lawsuit accusing Mayer of leading a sexist campaign to purge male employees. Ard, a male employee, stated "Mayer encouraged and fostered the use of (an employee performance-rating system) to accommodate management's subjective biases and personal opinions, to the detriment of Yahoo's male employees". In the suit Ard claimed prior to his firing, he had received "fully satisfactory" performance reviews since starting at the company in 2011 as head of editorial programming for Yahoo's home page, however, he was relieved of his role that was given to a woman who had been recently hired by Megan Lieberman, the editor-in-chief of Yahoo News.

The lawsuit states: "Liberman stated that she was terminating (Ard) because she had not received a requested breakdown of (his) duties. (Ard) had already provided that very information as requested, however, and reminded Liberman that he had done so. Liberman's excuse for terminating (Ard) was a pretext."

A second sexual discrimination lawsuit was filed separately by Gregory Anderson, who was fired in 2014, alleging the company's performance management system was arbitrary and unfair, making it the second sexism lawsuit Yahoo and Meyer has faced in 2016.

== Management ==
=== Board of Directors ===
- David Filo (2014) – Co-founder, Chief Yahoo and Director, Yahoo Inc.!
- Sue James (2010) – Retired Partner, Ernst & Young LLP
- Max Levchin (2012) – chairman and CEO, HVF, LLC
- Marissa Mayer (2012) – CEO, Yahoo! Inc.
- Thomas J. McInerney (2012) – Former Executive Vice President and Chief Financial Officer, IAC/InterActiveCorp
- Charles R. Schwab (2014) – chairman, the Charles Schwab Corporation.
- H. Lee Scott, Jr. (2014) – Retired President and chief executive officer, Wal-Mart Stores
- Jane E. Shaw (2014) – Retired Chairman of the Board, Intel Corporation
- Maynard Webb (2012) – chairman, Yahoo, founder, Webb Investment Network and chairman and former CEO of LiveOps

=== Chief Executive Officers ===
- Marissa Mayer (2012–2017)
- Ross Levinsohn (2012) – Interim
- Scott Thompson (2012)
- Tim Morse (2011–2012) – Interim
- Carol Bartz (2009–2011)
- Jerry Yang (2007–2009)
- Terry Semel (2001–2007)
- Timothy Koogle (1995–2001)

Former chief operating officer Henrique de Castro departed from the company in January 2014 after Mayer, who initially hired him after her appointment as CEO, dismissed him. De Castro, who previously worked for Google and McKinsey & Company, was employed to revive Yahoo's advertising business.

== Yahoo International ==
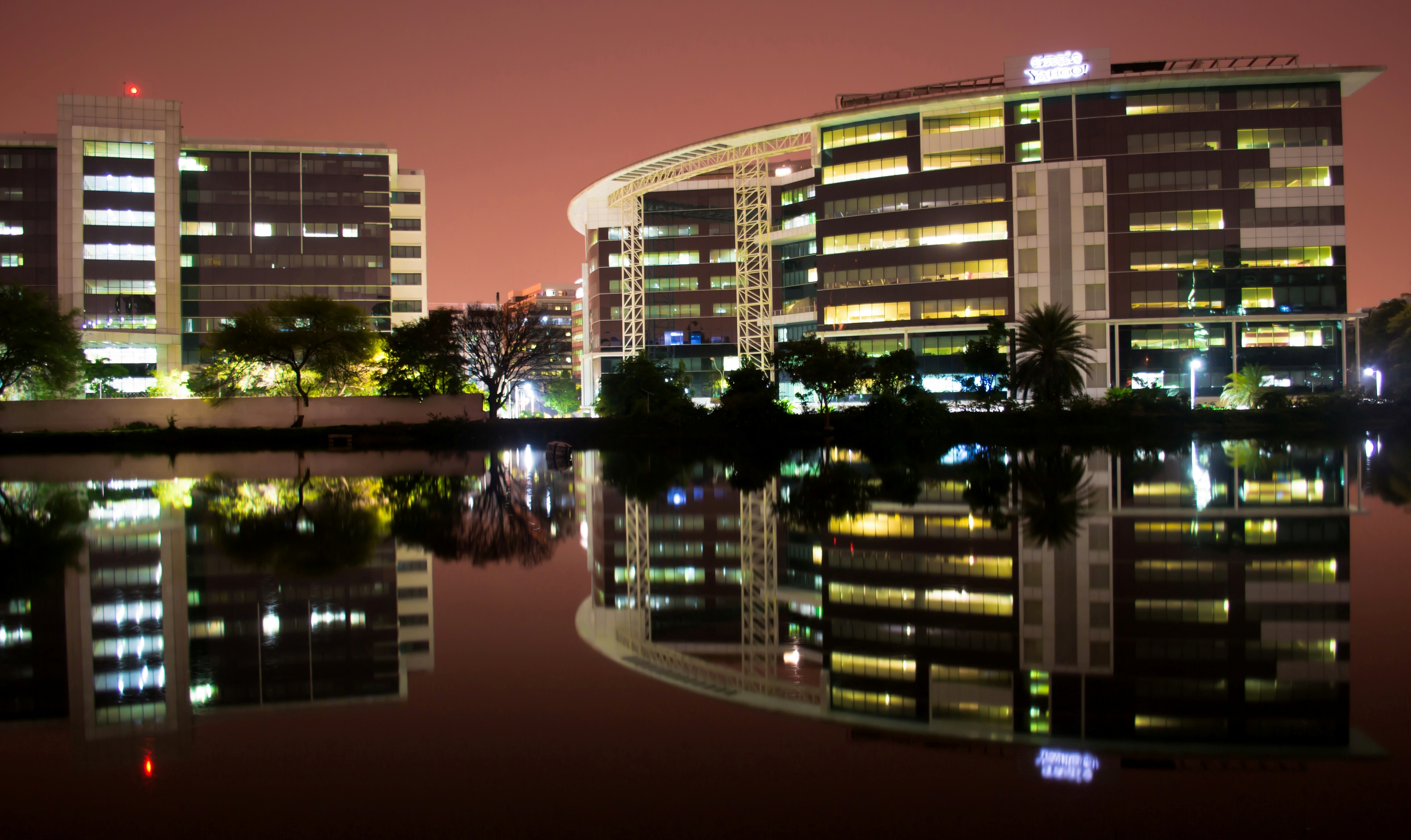
Yahoo's Bangalore office

Yahoo offers a multilingual interface. The site is available in over 20 languages.

Yahoo held a 34.75% minority stake in Yahoo Japan, while SoftBank held 35.45%. Yahoo!Xtra in New Zealand, which Yahoo!7 held 51% of and Telecom New Zealand held 49% of. Yahoo!7 in Australia was a 50–50 agreement between Yahoo and the Seven Network. Historically, Yahoo entered into joint venture agreements with SoftBank for the major European sites (UK, France and Germany) and well as South Korea and Japan. In November 2005, Yahoo purchased the minority interests that SoftBank owned in Europe and Korea.

On March 8, 2011, Yahoo launched its Romania local service after years of delay due to the 2008 financial crisis.

Yahoo officially entered the MENA region when it acquired Maktoob, a pan-regional, Arabic-language hosting and social services online portal, on August 25, 2009. Since the service is pan-regional, Yahoo officially became Yahoo Maktoob in the region.

On December 31, 2012, Yahoo Korea shut down all its services and left the country, with its previous domain saying in Korean, "Starting from December 31, 2012, Yahoo! Korea has ended. You can go to the original Yahoo! for more Yahoo's information." Sooner did that message also disappear, leaving with just an abandoned, empty search bar powered by Bing.

Yahoo used to hold a 40% stake in Alibaba, which manages a web portal in China using the Yahoo brand name. Yahoo in the USA does not have direct control over Alibaba, which operates as a completely independent company. On September 18, 2012, following years of negotiations, Yahoo agreed to sell a 20% stake back to Alibaba for $7.6 billion.

On September 2, 2013, Yahoo China shut down and was redirected to taobao.com, and has been being redirected to Yahoo Singapore's search page.

== Logos and themes ==
Logo used from 1996 to 2013 (shown: purple variant used from 2009), red version still used by Yahoo! Japan

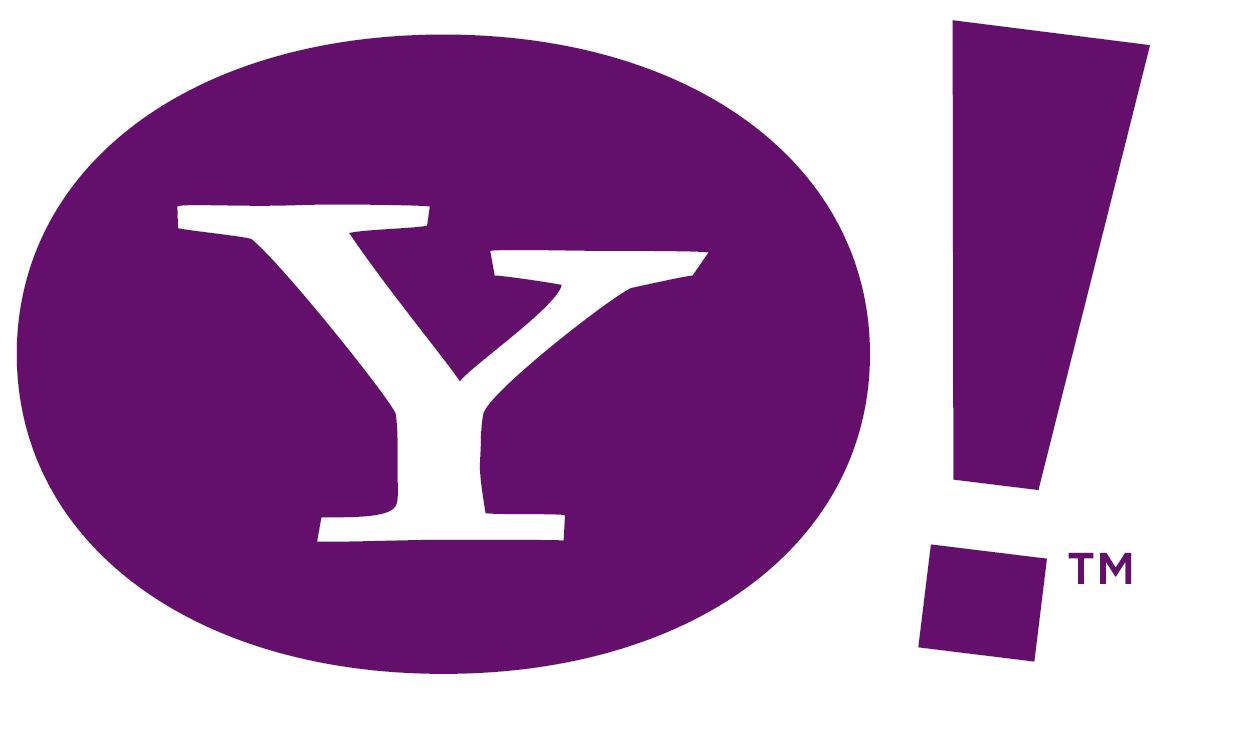
Yahoo logo with the Y! moniker (2009–2013)

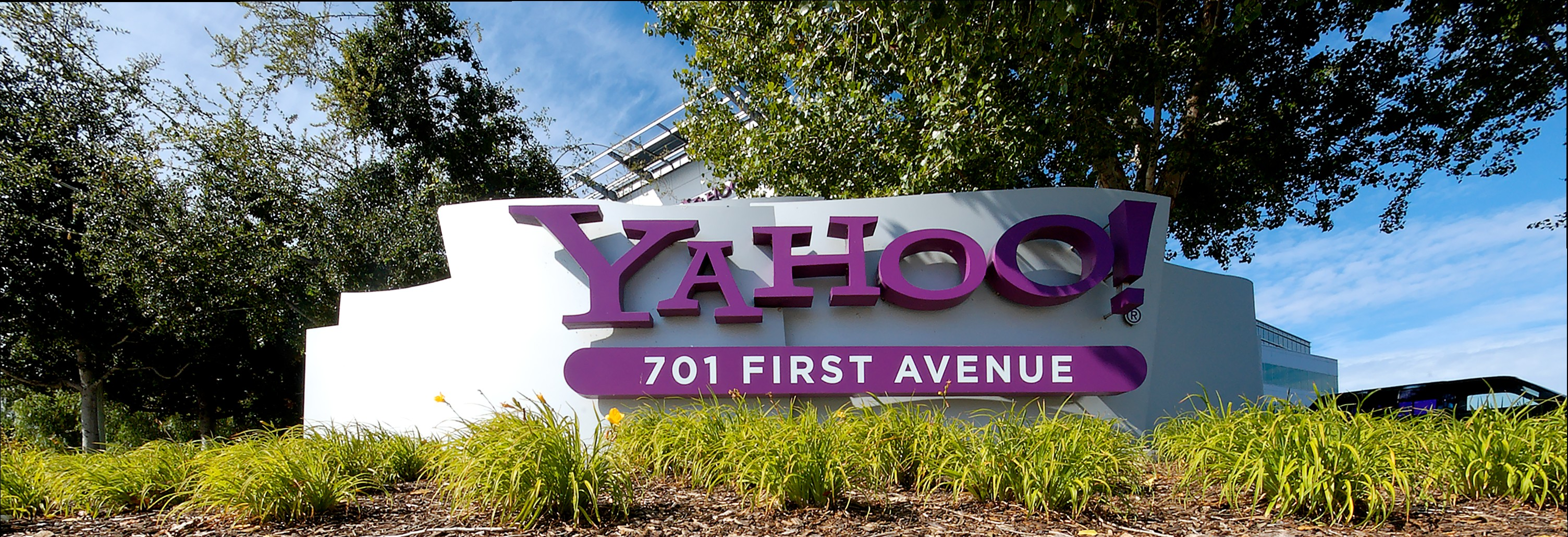
Yahoo! sign with address at its headquarters

The first logo appeared when the company was founded in 1994—it was red with three icons on each side. The logo used on the Yahoo home page formerly consisted of the color red with a black outline and shadow; however, in May 2009, together with a theme redesign, the logo was changed to purple without an outline or shadow. This change also applied to several international Yahoo home pages. In some countries, most notably Yahoo!7 (of Australia), the logo remained red until 2014. On occasion the logo is abbreviated: "Y!"

On August 7, 2013, at around midnight EDT, Yahoo announced that the final version of the new logo would be revealed on September 5, 2013, at 4:00 a.m. UTC. In the period leading up to the unveiling of the new logo, the "30 Days of Change" campaign was introduced, whereby a variation of the logo was published every day for the 30 days following the announcement. The new logo was eventually launched with an accompanying video that showed its digital construction, and Mayer published a personalized description of the design process on her Tumblr page. Mayer explains:

So, one weekend this summer, I rolled up my sleeves and dove into the trenches with our logo design team ... We spent the majority of Saturday and Sunday designing the logo from start to finish, and we had a ton of fun weighing every minute detail. We knew we wanted a logo that reflected Yahoo – whimsical, yet sophisticated. Modern and fresh, with a nod to our history. Having a human touch, personal. Proud.

On September 19, 2013, Yahoo launched a new version of the "My Yahoo" personalized homepage. The redesign allows users to tailor a homepage with widgets that access features such as email accounts, calendars, Flickr and other Yahoo content, and Internet content. Users can also select "theme packs" that represent artists such as Polly Apfelbaum and Alec Monopoly, and bands such as Empire of the Sun. Mayer then explained at a conference in late September 2013 that the logo change was the result of feedback from both external parties and employees.

== See also ==
- List of search engines
- List of web analytics software
- Yahoo! litigation
- Yahoo! Messenger Protocol
