= Collection of Human Right Poems =

Poetry anthology

The Collection of Human Right Poems is a poetry anthology that records Chinese right-protected history, especially numerous activities since the new century. Besides, it embodies the works of many authors reflecting people's consciousness and championship for their rights. The book describes that during the social transitional period from autarchy to democracy, the real-life normality is that common people's human rights are trampled by polity. Thus, the consciousness and championship for human rights are intimidation and aggression of Chinese despotism integral. In particular, because it is issued before Beijing Olympic Games, the Chinese government is concerned about the spread of this book could disturb their requisite harmoniousness. Therefore, the poetry anthology peeved China authority and was banned in mainland China during the process of compiling just as the Collection of June Fourth Poems.

The Collection of Human Right Poems was edited and issued by American "June Fourth Heritage & Culture Association" in co-operation with Taiwan Foundation for Democracy and the Taipei Economic and Cultural Office in Los Angeles

The chief editor is Pinchao Jiang who is also the chief editor of Collection of June Fourth Poems. The hatcher is Xiqiu Fu who is prizewinner of ERLC's Religious Liberty Award in 2007. Other editors are student leaders of June Forth Campaign Fengsuo Zhou, Jun Tao and dissident author Guobiao Jiao, Daobin Du and others.

The consultants are Yu Ying-shih who is a professor at Princeton University and the winner of the life achievement in literature and social sciences Kluge Prize, Morton Sklar who is the accuser attorney of Shi Tao's and Xiaoning Wang's lawsuit against Yahoo! in 2007, Albert Ho who is the President of Democratic Party (Hong Kong), Jin Zhong who is the chief editor of Hong Kong "Opening" journal, the Chinese right-protect personage Hu Jia who was condemned to three years and half by Chinese government, Chen Kuide who is the executive chairman of Chinese Academy of Princeton and chief editor of "Observation" website, Zeng Jianyuan who is an assistant professor of Administration Department of Taiwan Chinese University and convener of laws and politics group of Taiwan Professor Association, Jiang Henglan who is the ex-chairman of American Chinese Democracy Education Fund Association, Zhiwei Hu, who is the ex-chairman of Hong Kong Author's Association and governmental Literature Committee, commissary of Art Development Bureau, Amber Jia who is the director of marketing department of the fourteenth American listed company UnitedHealthCare.

The editor and consultant committee invites Chinese right-protect personage Feixiong Guo as the Honor Chief Editor.

This poetry anthology was inscribed by Situ Hua who is the president of The Hong Kong Alliance in Support of Patriotic Democratic Movements of China and was prefaced by dissident author Guobiao Jiao. The contents are made up of five portions: Democracy Thoughts, Livelihood Thoughts, Right-protect Actions, Right-protect Characters, Right-protect History.

== The E-book and network version of "Collection of Human Right Poems" ==
The E-book of "Collection of Human Right Poems" was produced by the chief editor of American "Democracy Forum" - Hong Zhesheng:

== Related reports of "Collection of Human Right Poems" ==
- Voice of America: "Collection of Human Right Poems" was banned before issuing by China authority
- The Central New Agency: "Collection of Human Right Poems" of June Fourth Association was banned by Chinese Communist
- Radio Free Asia: Situ Hua entitled for "Collection of Human Right Poems"
- The Central New Agency: "Collection of Human Right Poems" was synchronously issued in Taiwan, Hong Kong and the U.S. on June 4, 2008
- Radio Taiwan International: The chief editor of "Collection of Human Right Poems" Jiang Pinchao obtained 2008 "Free Speech Award" of American Visual Artists Guild

== Book Review ==
- Yazhou Zhoukan: 300 Human Right Poems praises Chinese Human Right movement
- Hong Kong <Ming Pao>: Confidential book of new century: tears of blood history of right-protect
- Radio Free Asia: Xiaohua Deng's "Collection of Human Right Poems" Book Review
