= Xiaoning et al v. Yahoo! Inc, et al =

Civil litigation in a federal court in San Francisco, California

Xiaoning et al v. Yahoo! Inc, et al, No. C 07-2151 CW, (N.D. Cal. Oct. 31, 2007) was a civil litigation in a federal court in San Francisco, California. The plaintiffs were Chinese citizens and democratic activists in China arrested, incarcerated, and tortured allegedly after defendants Yahoo provided Chinese officials with access to their personal emails, user IDs, and other identifying information. Yahoo settled with the plaintiffs out of court.

== Background ==
On April 18, 2007, the World Organization for Human Rights USA filed with the U.S. District Court for the Northern District of California a complaint against Yahoo! Inc., Yahoo! Holdings (Hong Kong), Ltd., Alibaba.com, Inc. on behalf of Wang Xiaoning, Shi Tao, and Yu Ning.

Both Wang Xiaoning and Shi Tao were imprisoned at the time, and Yu Ning was Wang Xiaoning's wife.

Wang, an engineer, was detained in 2002 and convicted in 2003 by Chinese officials for writing pro-democracy articles on a Yahoo Groups Web site. The evidence cited in the Chinese court's conviction included information provided by Yahool.

Shi Tao was serving a 10-year sentence at the time of the lawsuit. A Chinese newspaper journalist and editor, he was arrested in 2004 and sentenced in 2005 after he forwarded an email directing him not to cover the Tiananmen Square anniversary to an overseas Web site.

In July 2007, the court dismissed Alibaba from the case.

== The case ==
In the complaint, the plaintiffs sought to hold defendants liable under the Alien Tort Statute (28 U.S.C. § 1350), the Torture Victims Protection Act (28 U.S.C. § 1350), the Electronic Communication Privacy Act (18 U.S.C. § 2701 et seq.), and California state law for battery, assault, false imprisonment, intentional infliction of emotional distress, and other causes of actions.

According to the complaint, plaintiffs had used Yahoo accounts to share pro-democracy materials, and a Chinese subsidiary of Yahoo gave the Chinese government the access to private email records which contained pro-democracy literature.

Defendants filed a motion to dismiss. Defendants argued that plaintiffs' claims were not justiciable because of the act of state doctrine, the political question doctrine, and the principles of international comity, among other arguments. Defendants also moved for dismissal for lack of personal jurisdiction for Yahoo! Hong Kong Limited. In response, the plaintiffs filed a motion for an order permitting initial and jurisdictional discovery in order to respond to the defendants' argument in their motion to dismiss.

On October 31, 2007, the court concluded the plaintiffs were entitled to discovery on the narrow issue of whether the court had personal jurisdiction over Yahoo! Holdings (Hong Kong), Ltd. In reaching this conclusion, the court stated that the defendants made factual allegations in the motion to dismiss for lack of personal jurisdiction over Yahoo! Hong Kong Limited, and that given plaintiffs' limited access to information concerning the contacts with California, it would be unfair to require them to oppose the motion without discovery.

Yahoo settled the case in November 2007 for an undisclosed amount of money. In a statement released after the settlement, Yahoo said it would "provide 'financial, humanitarian and legal support to these families' and create a separate 'humanitarian relief fund' for other dissidents and their families."

== See also ==
- Alien Tort Statute
- Wang Xiaoning
- Shi Tao
- Yahoo! Litigation
