= List of corporate directors of Yahoo =

This is an alphabetical list of corporate directors of Yahoo!, past:

== Current board members ==
As of December 19, 2016:

- Tor Braham (2016) – managing director and global head of technology, mergers and acquisitions at Deutsche Bank Securities
- Eric Brandt
- David Filo (2014) – co-founder, chief Yahoo and director, Yahoo Inc.!
- Catherine J. Friedman
- Eddy Hartenstein (2016) – non-executive chairman of the board of directors at Tronc
- Richard Hill – chairman of the board of directors at Tessera Technologies
- Vinny Lingham – co-founder & CEO at Civic
- Marissa Mayer (2012) – CEO, Yahoo! Inc.
- Thomas J. McInerney (2012) – former executive vice president and chief financial officer, IAC/InterActiveCorp
- Charles R. Schwab (2014) – chairman of Charles Schwab Corporation.
- Jane E. Shaw (2014) – retired chairman of the board at Intel Corporation
- Jeffrey Smith (2016) – chief executive officer & chief investment officer at Starboard Value
- Maynard Webb (2012) – chairman, Yahoo, founder, Webb Investment Network and chairman and former CEO of LiveOps

== Past board members ==
- Alfred Amoroso
- Carol Bartz
- Frank Biondi
- Roy J. Bostock
- Patti Hart
- Eric Hippeau
- Sue James (2010) – retired partner, Ernst & Young
- Vyomesh Joshi
- David Kenny
- Timothy Koogle
- Robert Kotick
- Max Levchin (2012) – chairman and CEO, HVF, LLC
- Peter Liguori
- Daniel S. Loeb
- Jeff Mallett
- Marissa Mayer
- Thomas J. McInerney
- Jonathan Miller
- H. Lee Scott, Jr. (2014) – retired president and chief executive officer Wal-Mart Stores
- Brad D. Smith
- Scott Thompson
- Maynard Webb (2012) – chairman, Yahoo; founder, Webb Investment Network; chairman and former CEO of LiveOps
- Gary L. Wilson
- Harry Wilson
- Michael Wolf
- Jerry Yang
