= Guo Quan =

Chinese activist (born 1968)

- Born: 8 May 1968 (age 58); China
- Criminal charge: subversion of state power
- Criminal penalty: 10 years in prison (2009); 4 years in prison (2022)
- Spouse: Li Jing
- Children: Noah Guo

Guo Quan (Chinese: 郭泉; pinyin: Guō Quán; born 1968) is a Chinese human rights activist, former judge and a dedicated scholar in philosophy and sociology. He founded the China New Democracy Party. He is a state-owned enterprise cadre, secretary of the Nanjing Economic Restructuring Commission and Nanjing People's Court cadre.

== Early activities ==
He received both a PhD in philosophy and a master's degree of sociology from Nanjing University. From 1999 to 2001 he was a post-doctorate researcher at Nanjing Normal University. In 2001, he was a both a professor and a PhD candidate advisor at Nanjing Normal University. He was also a researcher in the Nanjing Massacre Research Center.

He gained early prominence for his anti-Japanese activities. In 2005, he gained national attention for smashing a Japanese-sponsored tomb monument dedicated to the 16th century pirate leader Wang Zhi, someone Guo considered a race traitor for collaborating with Japanese pirates (wokou).

== Open letters to Hu Jintao ==
On 14 November 2007, Professor Guo Quan published an open letter to Chinese communist leaders Hu Jintao and Wu Bangguo, calling for a "democratic government based on multi-party elections that serves the interests of the common folks."

Guo's very public open letters to President Hu Jintao demanding multi-party elections and the depoliticisation of the People's Liberation Army were widely published in the internet blogosphere as well as the traditional media. Since then the Chinese cyber-police had begun to censor his blogs.

In early 2008, Guo Quan announced plans to sue Yahoo (Chief Executive Jerry Yang) and Google in the United States for censorship of Chinese material for unjustified reasons. On 6 February 2008, Guo Quan told Jane Macartney of The Times that the Chinese Yahoo site had also blocked his name, and as a result was planning on suing Yahoo! as well.

== New Democracy Party of China ==
According to the published constitution of the New Democracy Party of China, the party claims to have 10 million members. Guo claimed that the majority of the New Democracy Party's members are petitioners, with 40 million currently nationwide. He claimed that over 10 million of them have contacted him over the years, representing the first wave of the New Democracy Party.

My preliminary statistics show that there are nearly 10 million people, one-fifth of whom are Communist Party members. For Communist Party members who want to join the New Democracy Party, I suggest that they first complete the withdrawal procedures. So, the first batch of members currently consists of 8 million. 2 million Communist Party members said they would definitely complete the withdrawal procedures. They have already identified themselves as members of the New Democracy Party.

— Guo Quan,

== Police harassment and arrests ==
On 21 May 2008, Jonathan Watts of The Guardian reported that Chinese police have detained Guo Quan, a political dissident who criticized the government's handling of the 2008 Sichuan earthquake. Guo was seized outside his home by seven or eight police officers on 17 May 2008. They searched his house and confiscated his computer.

The PEN American Center wrote:

Writer and former professor of literature at Nanjing Normal University, detained November 13, 2008 on "suspicion of subverting state authority." The reason for his arrest is not yet known, but is believed to be related to his writings. He had been detained for ten days in May 2008 following seven articles he published on mainland Chinese web sites that criticize the government's emergency response to the May 12, 2008 Sichuan earthquake and the safety of certain infrastructures.

On 13 November 2008, cnews reported that Guo Quan was arrested in the city of Nanjing. According to his wife, the police's charge was "subversion of state power". Chinese police routinely uses the charge of "subversion of state power" to imprison dissidents for years. On 17 October 2009, Reuters reported that he was sentenced to 10 years in prison. He has been described as a political prisoner.

On 31 January 2020, Guo was detained by police in Nanjing. On 20 December 2022, he was sentenced to a further four years in jail for "incitement to subvert state power", the charges stemming from his criticism of officials during the early stages of the COVID-19 pandemic.

On January 30, 2024, Guo Quan was released from prison after serving his sentence.

== See also ==
- Jiang Lijun
- Shi Tao
- Wang Xiaoning
- Hanfu
- List of Chinese pro-democracy activists
