= Jiang Pinchao =

Chinese poet (born 1967)

Jiang Pinchao (Chinese: 蒋品超; pinyin: Jiǎng Pǐnchāo; born 1967) is a Chinese poet. Four books he either authored or edited are held in the collections of the U.S. Library of Congress, and another book he edited is held in the collection of the National Library of Australia. He is the director of June Fourth Heritage & Culture Association, chief editor of Collection of June Fourth Poems and Collection of Human Right Poems, and the first Chinese author to be blocked by Google. He was sentenced to four years imprisonment for his active participation in the Tiananmen Square protests of 1989 in China.

== Activist ==
=== Sentence ===
Due to his participation in the student democratic movement, he was arrested and jailed for four years and deprived of political rights for two years in the First Jail of the Hubei Province in China. In 1992, along with other political prisoners, he resisted the abuse, but was tortured and confined.

=== Internet block ===
In 2001 Jiang provoked controversy on the internet. He initiated the "re-ponder the history, be concerned about the politics, commiserate with the public" mindset and proposed the theory of "thoughts of public" and "thoughts of imagination". His topics involved the June Fourth Democratic Movement, the public view of politics in China, and other sensitive questions. He was one of the first to propose such touchy questions in China. Chinese poets took an active part in this controversy, but because of his strong and growing influence, Jiang was blocked from Internet usage by Chinese government officials in 2004.

=== Google block ===
On September 16, 2004, American Dynamic Internet issued a research report focusing on Jiang, revealing that Jiang was blocked by the Google search engine. The same day, Yisha and Shaojun Li, two authors who had argued with Jiang, were presented an annual prize in the Chinese "New Poetry" sub-culture.

Because Google broke its promise of "Don't be evil", the matter attracted international attention. The United States Congress and Secretary of State, Condoleezza Rice, held hearings on the subject. On April 14, 2005, Jiang was nominated for "The President Culture Prize" in Taiwan.

Jiang testified and supported the American Congressional hearing on the internet blockage behavior of Google, Yahoo, Cisco and Microsoft on February 15, 2006. He accepted interviews with over 10 news outlets, including the Associated Press, Yomiuri Shimbun, and the Central News Agency of Taiwan.

=== International Fast ===
On March 5, 2006, Jiang, along with others, including Jinsheng Wei, Hongbing Yuan and Xue Sheng, launched an international fast, which included ten thousand people, to express support for individuals persecuted by the Chinese government. Jiang organized and presided over another Chinese protest in Los Angeles for similar reasons.
