= Criticism of Yahoo =

Yahoo! has faced significant scrutiny throughout its history regarding security, privacy, and corporate governance. The company was involved in several high-profile data breaches that affected its entire user base, alongside controversies related to its cooperation with government authorities and its handling of user data in international markets. These incidents led to numerous legal challenges, regulatory investigations, and a notable impact on the company's public reputation and valuation.

== Paid inclusion controversy ==
In March 2004, Yahoo! launched a paid inclusion program whereby commercial websites were guaranteed listings on the Yahoo! search engine after payment. This scheme was lucrative but proved unpopular both with website marketers (who were reluctant to pay), and the public (who were unhappy about the paid-for listings being indistinguishable from other search results). As of October 2006, Paid Inclusion ceased to guarantee any commercial listing and only helped the paid inclusion customers, by crawling their site more often and by providing some statistics on the searches that led to the page and some additional smart links (provided by customers as feeds) below the actual URL.

== Adware and spyware ==
Yahoo! has also been criticized for funding spyware and adware—advertising from Yahoo!'s clients often appears on-screen in pop-ups generated from adware that a user may have installed on their computer without realizing it by accepting online offers to download software to fix computer clocks or improve computer security, add browser enhancements, etc. The frequency of advertising pop-ups for spyware, generated from a partnership with advertising distributor Walnut Ventures, who had a direct partnership with Direct Revenue, could be increased or decreased based on Yahoo!'s immediate revenue needs, according to some former employees in Yahoo!'s sales department.

== Work in the People's Republic of China ==
Yahoo!, along with Google China, Microsoft, Cisco, AOL, Skype, Nortel and others, has cooperated with the Chinese Communist Party in implementing a system of internet censorship in mainland China.

Unlike Google or Microsoft, which generally keep confidential records of its users outside mainland China, Yahoo! stated that the company cannot protect the privacy and confidentiality of its mainland Chinese customers from the authorities.

Critics say that the companies put profits before principles. Human Rights Watch and Reporters Without Borders state that it is "ironic that companies whose existence depends on freedom of information and expression have taken on the role of censor."

=== Outing of Chinese dissidents ===
==== Shi Tao ====
In September 2005, Reporters Without Borders reported that in April 2005, Shi Tao, a journalist working for a Chinese newspaper, was sentenced to 10 years in prison by the Changsha Intermediate People's Court of Hunan Province, China (First trial case no. 29), for "providing state secrets to foreign entities". The "secrets" were a brief list of censorship orders he sent from a Yahoo! Mail account to the Asia Democracy Forum before the anniversary of the 1989 Tiananmen Square protests and massacre.

The verdict as published by the Chinese government stated that Shi Tao had sent the email through an anonymous Yahoo! account, that Yahoo! Holdings (the Hong Kong subsidiary of Yahoo) told the Chinese government that the IP address used to send the email was registered by the Hunan newspaper that Shi Tao worked for, and that police went straight to his offices and picked him up.

In February 2006, Yahoo! General Counsel submitted a statement to the U.S. Congress in which Yahoo! denied knowing the true nature of the case against Shi Tao. In April 2006, Yahoo! Holdings (Hong Kong) was investigated by Hong Kong's Privacy Commissioner for Personal Data.

On 2 June 2006, the union representing journalists in the UK and Ireland (NUJ) called on its 40,000 members to boycott all Yahoo! Inc. products and services to protest the Internet company's reported actions in China.

In July 2007, evidence surfaced detailing the warrant which the Chinese authorities sent to Yahoo! officials, highlighting "State Secrets" as the charge against Shi Tao. The warrant requests to provide "all login times, corresponding IP addresses, and relevant email content from February 22, 2004, to present." for email ID "huoyan1989" Analyst reports and human rights organizations have said that this evidence directly contradicts Yahoo!'s testimony before the U.S. Congress in February 2006.

Yahoo! contends it must respect the laws of governments in jurisdictions where it is operating.

==== Li Zhi ====
Criticism of Yahoo! intensified in February 2006 when Reporters Without Borders released Chinese court documents stating that Yahoo! aided Chinese authorities in the case of dissident Li Zhi. In December 2003 Li Zhi was sentenced to 8 years imprisonment for "inciting subversion".

==== Wang Xiaoning ====
Wang Xiaoning is a Chinese dissident from Shenyang who was arrested by authorities of the People's Republic of China for publishing controversial material online.

In 2000 and 2001, Wang, who was an engineer by profession, posted electronic journals in a Yahoo! group calling for democratic reform and an end to single-party rule. He was arrested in September 2002 after Yahoo! assisted Chinese authorities by providing information. In September 2003, Wang was convicted of charges of "incitement to subvert state power" and sentenced to ten years in prison.

On April 18, 2007, Xiaoning's wife Yu Ling sued Yahoo! under human rights laws in federal court in San Francisco, California, United States. Wang Xiaoning is named as a plaintiff in the Yahoo! suit, which was filed with help from the World Organization for Human Rights USA. "Yahoo! is guilty of 'an act of corporate irresponsibility,' said Morton Sklar, executive director of the group. "Yahoo! had reason to know that if they provided China with identification information that those individuals would be arrested."

Yahoo!'s decision to assist China's authoritarian government came as part of a policy of reconciling its services with the Chinese government's policies. This came after China blocked Yahoo! services for a time. As reported in The Washington Post and many media sources:

The suit says that in 2001, Wang was using a Yahoo! e-mail account to post anonymous writings to an Internet mailing list. The suit alleges that Yahoo!, under pressure from the Chinese government, blocked that account. Wang set up a new account via Yahoo! and began sending material again; the suit alleges that Yahoo! gave the government information that allowed it to identify and arrest Wang in September 2002. The suit says prosecutors in the Chinese courts cited Yahoo!'s cooperation.

Human rights organizations groups are basing their case on a 217-year-old U.S. law to punish corporations for human rights violations abroad, an effort the Bush administration has opposed:

In recent years, activists working with overseas plaintiffs have sued roughly two dozen businesses under the Alien Tort Claims Act, which the activists say grants jurisdiction to American courts over acts abroad that violate international norms. Written by the Founding Fathers in 1789 for a different purpose, the law was rarely invoked until the 1980s.

On August 28, 2007, the World Organization for Human Rights sued Yahoo! for allegedly passing information (email and IP address) with the Chinese government that caused the arrests of writers and dissidents. The lawsuit was filed in San Francisco for journalists, Shi Tao, and Wang Xiaoning. Yahoo! stated that it supported privacy and free expression for it worked with other technology companies to solve human rights concerns.

On November 6, 2007, the US congressional panel criticised Yahoo! for not giving full details to the House Foreign Affairs Committee the previous year, stating it had been "at best inexcusably negligent" and at worst "deceptive".

== User-created chat rooms, message boards, and profiles ==
As a result of media scrutiny relating to Internet child predators and a lack of significant ad revenues, Yahoo!'s "user created" chatrooms were closed down in June 2005. Yahoo! News' message board section was closed December 19, 2006, due to the trolling phenomenon. In addition, in mid-October 2008, Yahoo! deleted all information in millions of user profiles with no advance notice and little explanation.

== Image search ==
On May 25, 2006, Yahoo!'s image search was criticized for bringing up sexually explicit images even when SafeSearch was on. This was discovered by a teacher who was intending to use the service with a class to search for "www". Yahoo!'s response to this was, "Yahoo! is aware of this issue and is working to resolve it as quickly as possible".

== Shark fin controversy ==
Yahoo! previously owned a 14.95% stake in Alibaba, which had been criticized for facilitating the sale of shark-derived products. After investing in Alibaba, Yahoo! executives were asked about this issue, and responded: "We know the sale of shark products is both legal in Asia and a centuries-old tradition. This issue is largely a cultural-practices one." Alibaba would later ban the sale of shark fins on its platform in 2009.

== GeoCities closure ==
GeoCities was a popular web hosting service founded in 1994. At the point Yahoo! purchased it in January 1999, it was reportedly the third most-browsed site on the World Wide Web. Despite its popularity, it had still not become profitable by late 1998.

Ten years later Yahoo! closed Geocities, deleting millions of web pages in the process. In September 2009, a month before it was closed, GeoCities received 10,477,049 unique visitors.

Vijay Mukhi, an internet and cybersecurity expert quoted in the Business Standard, criticized Yahoo's management of GeoCities; Mukhi described GeoCities as "a lost opportunity for Yahoo!", adding that "they could have made it a Facebook if they wanted". Rich Skrenta, the CEO of Blekko, posted on Twitter an offer to take over GeoCities from Yahoo! in exchange for 50% future revenue share.

== Yahoo! Groups remodel 2010 ==
In August 2010 Yahoo! Groups started rolling out a major software change. This change was denounced by a vast majority of users. On September 29, 2010, Jim Stoneham, Vice President of Yahoo!'s Communities products, announced that based on members feedback, Yahoo! Groups would be rolling back the recent changes.

== Flickr redesign 2013 ==
On May 20, 2013, Flickr, Yahoo!'s image and video hosting website, unveiled a redesigned layout and additional features, including one terabyte of free storage for all users, seamless photostream, cover photo and updated Android App. The redesigned layout fills the page with dynamically re-sized photos and, on the home page, displays recent comments on photos. Tech Radar described the new style Flickr as representing a "sea change" in its purpose. Many users criticized the changes, and the site's help forum received thousands of negative comments.

== 2014 malware attack ==
In January 2014, a large scale malware attack was discovered by Fox IT in the Netherlands that was targeted at Java and dated back to December 30, 2013, especially affecting users in Romania, France, and the UK and being delivered to 300,000 Yahoo! users per hour when they discovered it. Yahoo! was criticized for not providing any public guidance on the number of users affected or advice on what the affected users should do.

== Data breaches ==
The company reported two major data breaches of user account data to hackers during the second half of 2016. The first announced breach, reported in September 2016, had occurred sometime in late 2014, and affected over 500 million Yahoo! user accounts. A separate data breach, occurring earlier around August 2013, was reported in December 2016, and affected over 1 billion user accounts. Both breaches are considered the largest discovered in the history of the Internet. Specific details of material taken include names, email addresses, telephone numbers, encrypted or unencrypted security questions and answers, dates of birth, and encrypted passwords. Further, Yahoo! reported that the late 2014 breach likely used manufactured web cookies to falsify login credentials, allowing hackers to gain access to any account without a password.

== Allegations of sexism against men ==
Scott Ard, a prominent editorial director fired from Yahoo in 2015, has filed a lawsuit accusing Mayer of leading a sexist campaign to purge male employees. Ard, a male employee, stated "Mayer encouraged and fostered the use of [an employee performance-rating system] to accommodate management's subjective biases and personal opinions, to the detriment of Yahoo's male employees". In the suit, Ard claimed that, prior to his firing, he had received "fully satisfactory" performance reviews since starting at the company in 2011 as head of editorial programming for Yahoo's home page, yet he was relieved of his role that was given to a woman who had been recently hired by Megan Lieberman, the editor-in-chief of Yahoo News.

A second sexual discrimination lawsuit was filed separately by Gregory Anderson, who was fired in 2014, alleging the company's performance management system was arbitrary and unfair, making it the second sexism lawsuit Yahoo and Mayer faced in 2016. The lawsuit was dismissed with prejudice in 2018.

== Illegally accessing user accounts ==
In October 2019, a former Yahoo engineer, Reyes Daniel Ruiz, pleaded guilty to federal charges of illegally accessing user accounts. Ruiz had hacked about 6,000 users' accounts, including those of his friends, co-workers and many young women, seeking sexual images and videos.

== See also ==
- Criticism of Apple Inc.
- Criticism of Facebook
- Criticism of Google
- Criticism of Microsoft
