= New Democracy Party of China =

New Democracy Party of China 中国新民党
- Founder: Guo Quan
- Founded: 17 December 2007
- Ideology: Liberalism (China); Social democracy Democratic socialism

Party flag

Website
- www.zgxmd.org/

The New Democracy Party of China (NDPC; simplified Chinese: 中国新民党; traditional Chinese: 中國新民黨; pinyin: Zhōngguó Xinmíndǎng) is a political party that started in the People's Republic of China, and is banned by the Chinese government. It was established by Guo Quan, a professor at Nanjing Normal University in 2007 after he published an open letter to the leaders of China. The second acting chairman is Cunzhu Zheng, who was also a student leader in Anhui Province in 1989's Tiananmen Square Protests.

== About Guo Quan ==
The New Democracy Party of China was founded by Guo Quan, a former associate professor at Nanjing Normal University. He was arrested by police near his Nanjing home. "He tried to set up an opposition party, they accused him of 'subversion of state power,' "Mr. Guo's wife said. "They told me that he had been formally arrested, but they didn't give me any details," Li said. "They gave a bunch of documents to his mother."

Guo's defense attorney Guo Lianhui commented that Guo made his differing political views public, and the authorities mobilized the state machinery to suppress him: "my client published a series of articles called 'Democratic Voice' and pointed out that there is no democracy and observance of human rights in China."

On October 15, 2009, Guo was sentenced to serve ten years in prison.
