= June Fourth Heritage & Culture Association =

June Fourth Heritage & Culture Association is a United States-based non-governmental non-profit organization that conducts research and advocacy on the Culture of June Fourth Movement, Democracy, Political Freedom, and Human Rights in China.

It had joined the case of Shi Tao's and Xiaoning Wang's lawsuit against Yahoo!, whose Hong Kong office handed over their personal information to Chinese government, and it caused them to be sentenced to 10 and 12 years in jail. On November 13, 2007, Yahoo finally settled this case with Shi Tao and Xiaoning Wang with mutual agreement.

June Fourth Heritage & Culture Association published Collection of June Fourth Poems, a work was edited by some former student leaders and scholars. However, this work was banned by Chinese government in December 2006. It also published the work Collection of Human Right Poems by some writers, scholars, and human right activists in June 2008, which was also banned by the government of China in April 2008.

June Fourth Heritage & Culture Association is being brutally repressed by the communist regime in China. Four of its senior members have been sentenced to jail in September 2007, including Feixiong Guo, Hu Jia, Huang Qi, and Du Daobin.

The Organizations or Groups that cooperate with June Fourth Heritage & Culture Association include: Taiwan Foundation for Democracy, The Taipei Economic and Cultural Office in Los Angeles, Democratic Party (Hong Kong), Hong Kong Alliance in Support of Patriotic Democratic Movements of China, The Epoch Times, and others.

According to Stein Toennesson, director of the International Peace Research Institute of Oslo, "one of the most likely winner of Nobel Peace Prize 2008 is Hu Jia", who is also the director of June Fourth Heritage & Culture Association.
