= Yahoo litigation =

Yahoo! has been a party to several instances of litigation.

== Patent litigation ==
=== FindWhat.com ===
In May 1999, GoTo.com filed a patent application titled "System and method for influencing a position on a search result list generated by a computer network search engine". The patent was granted as US 6269361 in July 2001. A related patent has also been granted in Australia and other patent applications remain pending.

Prior to its acquisition by Yahoo!, Overture initiated infringement proceedings under this patent against FindWhat.com in January 2002 and Google in April 2002.

=== Google ===
The lawsuit against Google related to its AdWords service. In February 2002, Google introduced a service called AdWords Select that allowed marketers to bid for higher placement in marked sections - a tactic that had some similarities to Overture's search-listing auctions.

Following Yahoo!'s acquisition of Overture, the lawsuit was settled with Google agreeing to issue 2.7 million shares of common stock to Yahoo! in exchange for a perpetual license.

=== Facebook ===
Yahoo filed a suit against Facebook on March 12, 2012, claiming Facebook had infringed on ten of Yahoo's patents .

== Geocities ==
In 1999, a complaint was instituted against GeoCities stating that the corporation violated the provisions of the Federal Trade Commission Act under 14 USC §45, which states in relevant part, "Unfair methods of competition in or affecting commerce, and unfair or deceptive acts or practices in or affecting commerce, are hereby declared unlawful." The FTC found that GeoCities was engaged in deceptive acts and practices in contravention to their stated privacy act. Subsequently, a consent order was entered into which prohibits GeoCities from misrepresenting the purpose for which it collects and/or uses personal identifying information from consumers. A copy of the complaint and order can be found at 127 F.T.C. 94 (page 94).

The litigation came about in this way: GeoCities provided free home pages and e-mail address to children and adults who provided personally identifying and demographic information when they registered for the website. At the time of the complaint, GeoCities had more than 1.8 million members who were "homesteaders." GeoCities illegally permitted third-party advertisers to promote products targeted to GeoCities' 1.8 million users, by using personally identifiable information obtained in the registration process. These acts and practices affected "commerce" as defined in Section 4 of the Federal Trade Commission.

The problem GeoCities faced was that it placed a privacy statement on its New Member Application Form and on its website promising that it would never give personally identifying information to anyone without the user's permission. GeoCities sold personal information to third parties who used the information for purposes other than those for which members gave permission.

It was ordered that GeoCities would not make any misrepresentation, in any manner about its collection or use of personal identifying information, including what information will be disclosed to third parties. GeoCities was not allowed to collect personal identifying information from any child if GeoCities had actual knowledge that the child did not have his parents' permission to provide the information.

== Wang Xiaoning and Shi Tao ==
On April 18, 2007, Wang Xiaoning's wife Yu Ling sued Yahoo! under human rights laws, specifically the Alien Torts Statute (28 U.S.C. § 1350) and Torture Victim Protection Act of 1991 (TVPA), 106 Stat. 73 (1992) in federal court in San Francisco, California, United States. Wang was named as a plaintiff in the Yahoo suit, as was Shi Tao, a Chinese journalist detained and convicted for emailing a description of Chinese's government's instructions to journalists for the upcoming anniversary of the 1989 Tiananmen Square Massacre. Both men were punished for exercising their freedom of speech because Yahoo!’s Chinese subsidiary provided their identifying information to the Chinese government.

The lawsuit was filed by the World Organization for Human Rights USA. "Yahoo is guilty of 'an act of corporate irresponsibility,' said Morton Sklar, then the Executive Director of the group. 'Yahoo had reason to know that if they provided China with identification information that those individuals would be arrested."

In 2006, Yahoo! executives had testified before the House Committee on Foreign Affairs that the company was unaware of the nature of the charges against Shi Tao when it gave his personal information to the Chinese government. However, in the course of the litigation, new evidence came to light that Yahoo! knew what the charges against Shi Tao were and disclosed his identity anyway.

In November 2007, Yahoo! was called back to Congress to testify about its actions in China before the bi-partisan House Committee on Foreign Affairs. The plaintiffs’ families traveled from China to bear witness as the Committee questioned Yahoo!’s executives. Referencing the discrepancy between Yahoo!’s leaders’ testimony in 2006 and the new evidence, the Committee Chair, Representative Tom Lantos, said Yahoo!’s failure to correct the record was inexcusably negligent behavior at best and deliberately deceptive behavior at worst.

Rep. Lantos then told CEO Jerry Yang and General Counsel Michael Callahan to beg forgiveness from the families of the detainees. Both men turned and bowed to the women, and publicly apologized. One week later, Yahoo! and the family settled the lawsuit.

Shi Tao and Wang Xiaoning remain in prison.

== Pincus v. Yahoo! Inc. ==
Pincus v. Yahoo! Inc., 13-cv-05326, was a lawsuit filed in the United States District Court for the Northern District of California in San Jose, California. Brian Pincus was seeking a class-action suit to represent non-Yahoo customers whose email address was intercepted by Yahoo! who allegedly targets ads to increase its revenue.

== See also ==
- Yahoo! data breaches § Legal and commercial responses
