= Tim Morse =

American Chief Financial Officer

Timothy R. Morse was the CEO of Ten-X. Previously Morse was the interim CEO of the Internet services company, Yahoo!. He was named after Carol Bartz lost her position as CEO on September 6, 2011. In January 2012, Yahoo picked Scott Thompson as the new CEO.

Morse was CFO prior to his appointment.

== Education ==
Morse is a graduate of Boston College Carroll School of Management, from which he obtained a bachelor's degree in finance and operations and strategic management.

== Business career ==
Morse began his career at General Electric, and worked in various divisions: GE Plastics, GE Appliances and GE Capital in North America, Europe and Asia. He became general manager of business development for General Electric Plastics before being appointed its chief financial officer. After his departure from GE, Morse was the chief financial officer of Altera.

He was hired, by then CEO Carol Bartz, and was appointed Chief Financial Officer for Yahoo! in July 2009. He served as Yahoo!'s interim chief executive officer (CEO) for roughly four months (September 2011 to January 2012), after the board relieved Carol Bartz of her position, and then returned to his previous position as CFO.

On September 25, 2012, it was announced that Morse will leave Yahoo! and will be replaced by Ken Goldman on October 22, 2012. After leaving Yahoo! he joined San Mateo–based Adap.tv. In June 2015, Auction.com named Morse as the company's CEO.

Business positions
Preceded by Carol Bartz	Chief Executive Officer of Yahoo! Acting; 2011	Succeeded by Scott Thompson
