= Daobin Du =

Chinese dissident (born 1964)

Du Daobin is one of China's first online dissidents.

== Biography ==
The Chinese authorities arrested Du Daobin on October 28, 2003 for writing articles online advocating democracy and respect for human rights. He was sentenced in 2004 to three years in prison, suspended for four years.

In July 2008, Du was re-arrested; police declared that he had to serve the remaining two years and four months of his sentence in prison, apparently for "violating the terms of his sentence by publishing more than 100 articles on the Internet, leaving the city, and receiving guests without permission from the police". Some attributed it to the world attention the 2008 Summer Olympics would bring to China. Du was released from prison in 2010.

== Du Daobin v. Cisco Systems ==
In June 2011, Du Daobin, Zhou Yuanzhi, and Liu Xianbin filed suit in the U.S. District Court for the District of Maryland against Cisco Systems and a number of Cisco executives for their alleged "know[ledge] and willful aiding and abetting of the Chinese Communist Party's harassment, arrest, and torture of Chinese political activists". Cisco responded to the lawsuit in a blog post June 6, 2011.

On August 3, 2011, Du was detained by Chinese police and interrogated by senior officials from China's Ministry of Public Security. Du's interrogators warned him about his Internet activity and then demanded information about his role in Du v. Cisco, including the names of his American and Chinese contacts.

The Federal District Court in Maryland dismissed Du Daobin v. Cisco Systems in February 2014. The Electronic Frontier Foundation criticized the decision, which "largely side-stepped the specific issue of when corporations can be held to account for building special technologies that are customized for repressive governments for the explicit purpose of tracking activists who then face human rights abuses like torture". Furthermore, citing the fact that U.S. laws allowed Cisco to export its products, the court maintained that it was precluded from providing judicial remedy to victims of China's human rights abuses. It also argued that "Cisco's involvement in human rights abuses in China was a 'political question'", even though "neither the U.S. nor the Chinese government objected to the case going forward", which is what usually happens when governments expect significant negative fallout for U.S. foreign policy.

== See also ==
- Censorship in China
- Golden Shield Project
- Human rights in China
- United Nations Guiding Principles on Business and Human Rights
