= Collection of June Fourth Poems =

2007 anthology about the Tiananmen protests

Collection of June Fourth Poems: Commemorating the Tiananmen Square Protest is an anthology of poems commemorating the June Fourth protests in China (1989 Tiananmen Square protests and massacre) and published in 2007. The poems were written by victims, exiled activists and international supporters. It documents the history and cultural impact of the June Fourth movement.This book has been subjected to repeated, large-scale bans by the Chinese government at both the national and local levels. It is among the most frequently banned books by the Chinese government on record.This book has been acquired for the collections of the Library of Congress in the United States, the National Library of Australia, and other national libraries worldwide.

== Overview ==
The chief editor is Pinchao Jiang, a student leader in June Fourth Event. Other editors include Wang Dan, Boli Zhang, Pokong Cheng, also student leaders; Hongbin Yuan, an organizer of the supporting teachers group from Beijing University; Xue Sheng, an organizer of the overseas supporting group; and Caitlin Anderson, a doctorate candidate of Research Center of East Asia of Princeton University.

The advisory committee include Yu Ying-shih, who is a professor at Princeton University and the winner of the life achievement in literature and social sciences Kluge Prize; Perry Link, who is the professor of Research Center of East Asia of Princeton University; Juntao Wang, who is a doctor of politics at Columbia University, and was the coordinator between the government and the student in the period of June Fourth Democratic Movement; Szeto Wah, who was the chairman of the Hong Kong Alliance in Support of Patriotic Democratic Movements of China; Hengnan Jiang, who is the director of the America Democratic Education Foubdation; Wu Chi-wai, who was the commissioner of the Bureau of Art Development, chairman of Literature Committee of Hongkang; Tseng Chien-Yuan, doctor of the Institute of National Development of National Taiwan University, and the former vice-director of Ministry of Law of Brainpower; Bob Fu, the director of the China Aid Association; Amber Jia, the majordomo of Asian market department of UnitedHealthCare Company, which is the 14th-biggest company in the USA.

The Collection produced by June Fourth Heritage & Culture Association in co-operation with Taiwan Foundation for Democracy and the Taipei Economic and Cultural Office in Los Angeles

== English references ==
- Reporters without borders: China : Ban on anthology of poems about Tiananmen Square movement

== Chinese references ==
- Sound of Hope Radio: Returning Chinese Student Disappeared for having Collection of June Fourth Poems
- Radio of Center of Broadcast of Taiwan: Chinese government full-scale ban Collection of June Fourth Poems
- Radio of France International Broadcast: student leader of June Fourth of 1989 Student Movement censure Chinese government ban Collection of June Fourth Poems
- Radio of Free Asia of the United States: Chinese government extend ban of the Collection of June Fourth Poems
- The voice of American: Chinese government ban the spread of the pirate of Collection of June Fourth Poems
