= Maynard Webb =

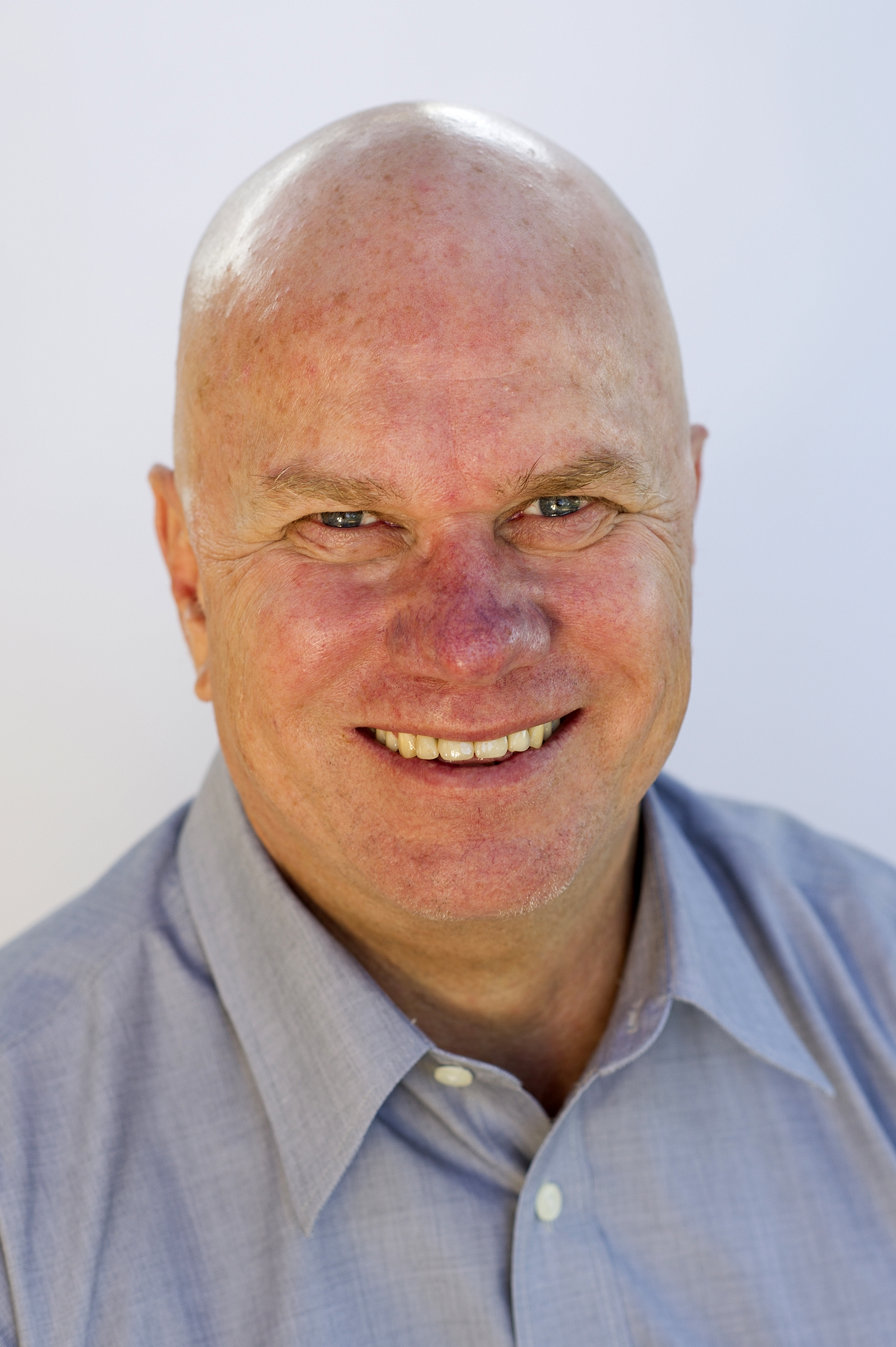
- Born: 1955 (age 70–71)
- Education: Bachelor's Degree, Florida Atlantic University
- Known for: Author, Rebooting Work: Transform How You Work in the Age of Entrepreneurship (2013)
- Title: Chairman of Yahoo! Founder of Webb Investment

Maynard G. Webb Jr. (born 1955) is an American business person and is the author of the New York Times bestseller Rebooting Work: Transform How You Work in the Age of Entrepreneurship, and the national bestseller Dear Founder: Letters of Advice for Anyone who Leads, Manages, or Wants to Start a Business. A long-time technology executive and angel investor, Webb is a board member of Visa and AppLovin. He previously served as chairman of the board of directors at Yahoo!, until 2017 and on the board of directors at Salesforce from 2006 until 2026. Webb founded Webb Investment Network in 2010 and is the former CEO of LiveOps and former COO of eBay.

== Education and career ==
Webb received his Bachelor's Degree in criminal justice from Florida Atlantic University. After graduation, he took a security guard job at IBM. He later held management and leadership positions at Bay Networks, Quantum Corporation, and Thomas-Conrad Corporation and was Senior Vice President and Chief Information Officer at Gateway, Inc.

From 1999 to 2006, Webb held various titles at eBay, including President of Technology and Chief Operating Officer. During his tenure, eBay grew from $140 million in revenue to over $4.5 billion in 2005 as the employee base expanded from 250 to more than 12,000.

During that time, LiveOps was named one of Forbes’ Ten Hot Start-Ups (2009), expanded into the enterprise market, generated more capital than it had originally raised, and expanded its board with executives from Symantec, Hewlett-Packard, PeopleSoft, and eBay.

== Writing ==
With Carlye Adler, Webb authored a New York Times best-selling book entitled Rebooting Work: Transform How You Work in the Age of Entrepreneurship, which was published in January 2013. The book focuses on how work models developed a century ago are out of sync today, identifies four mindsets about work, and explains how to leverage technology to change how we work. Over the years, Webb has blogged about entrepreneurship and work in the Internet economy. Webb's second book, Dear Founder: Letters of Advice for Anyone Who Leads, Manages, or Wants to Start a Business, with a Foreword by Howard Schultz, former executive chairman and CEO of Starbucks, was published by St. Martin's Press on September 11, 2018.

== Investments ==
In 2010, he founded Webb Investment Network (WIN) for early-stage investing in ecommerce, mobile, cloud computing, and enterprise startups. Startups that WIN funds have access to a network of 89 industry experts from companies such as Google, PayPal, Oracle, and Hewlett-Packard. The network was built from Webb’s business connections. WIN is considered to be part of a trend of smaller, early-stage funds that are indirectly challenging the traditional venture capital model.

== Philanthropy ==
Webb and his wife Irene founded the Webb Family Foundation in 2004, an organization dedicated to “promoting meritocracy through helping underdogs in society meet their full potential.” Through grants, the foundation has supported disaster relief, youth mentoring, cancer research, education, and other organizations.
