= Li Zhi (dissident) =

Chinese dissident

- 李智
- Born: 1970 or 1971 (age 55–56)
- Occupation: City government official
- Known for: Civil rights advocacy

Li Zhi (Chinese: 李智; pinyin: Lǐ Zhì) is a Chinese dissident. He worked as a civil servant in Dazhou. He was arrested in 2003 for his postings of information on local corruption on the Internet.

== Arrest ==
At a time when the internet began to gain popularity with Chinese dissidents to exchange their views, while police had begun monitoring chatrooms, Li posted essays online that detailed local corruption. He was detained in Sichuan province in August 2003, formally charged with "conspiracy to subvert state power" in September, and sentenced for "inciting subversion" to eight years imprisonment in December that year. He was convicted also for his association with the Democracy Party of China, which is a banned organization in communist China. The Congressional-Executive Commission on China describes him as a political prisoner. It is alleged that part of the evidence against him, namely his e-mail account and username, was provided by the Hong Kong subsidiary of the Internet company Yahoo! to the Chinese authorities. Local sources said that the cooperation of Yahoo! with authorities had been mentioned in the verdict.

== Other cases ==
Other cases involving political prisoners in the People's Republic of China where information had been provided by Yahoo! are Shi Tao, Jiang Lijun, and Wang Xiaoning.

== See also ==
- Human rights in the People's Republic of China
- List of Chinese dissidents
