= Jiang Lijun =

Chinese freelance writer (born 1965)

Jiang Lijun (Chinese: 姜力钧; pinyin: Jiāng Lìjūn, born 1965) is a Chinese freelance writer. He has been detained by the Chinese government since November 2002 for posting articles on the Internet which the government considered subversive. He is a native of Tieling in Liaoning.

The articles written by Jiang included an open letter to the 16th National Congress of the Chinese Communist Party, which called for democratic reform.

Jiang was detained on November 6, 2002, and formally arrested on December 14, 2003, for "Internet writing and publishing dissident articles". He was charged with "Inciting subversion of the state power". On November 28, 2003, the no.2 Intermediate People's Court of Beijing found Jiang guilty and sentenced him to imprisonment for four years, and deprivation of political rights for one year. Since this time Jiang has been held in Jinzhou Prison (锦州监狱) in Liaoning.

A draft email found on his Yahoo page containing proposals for a more democratic China was the principal evidence against him. Writing this draft was considered by the Government as taking part in "subversive activities that aim to undermine the authority of the Communist Party".

In April 2006, Reporters Without Borders, which has been actively seeking Jiang's release, revealed that Yahoo! may have aided Chinese authorities in convicting Jiang by providing information about Jiang's email accounts on its servers in Hong Kong.

== Other cases ==
Other cases involving political prisoners in the People's Republic of China where information had been provided by Yahoo! are Shi Tao, Li Zhi, and Wang Xiaoning.

== See also ==
- Internet censorship in the People's Republic of China
