= Scott Thompson (businessman) =

American businessman (born 1957)

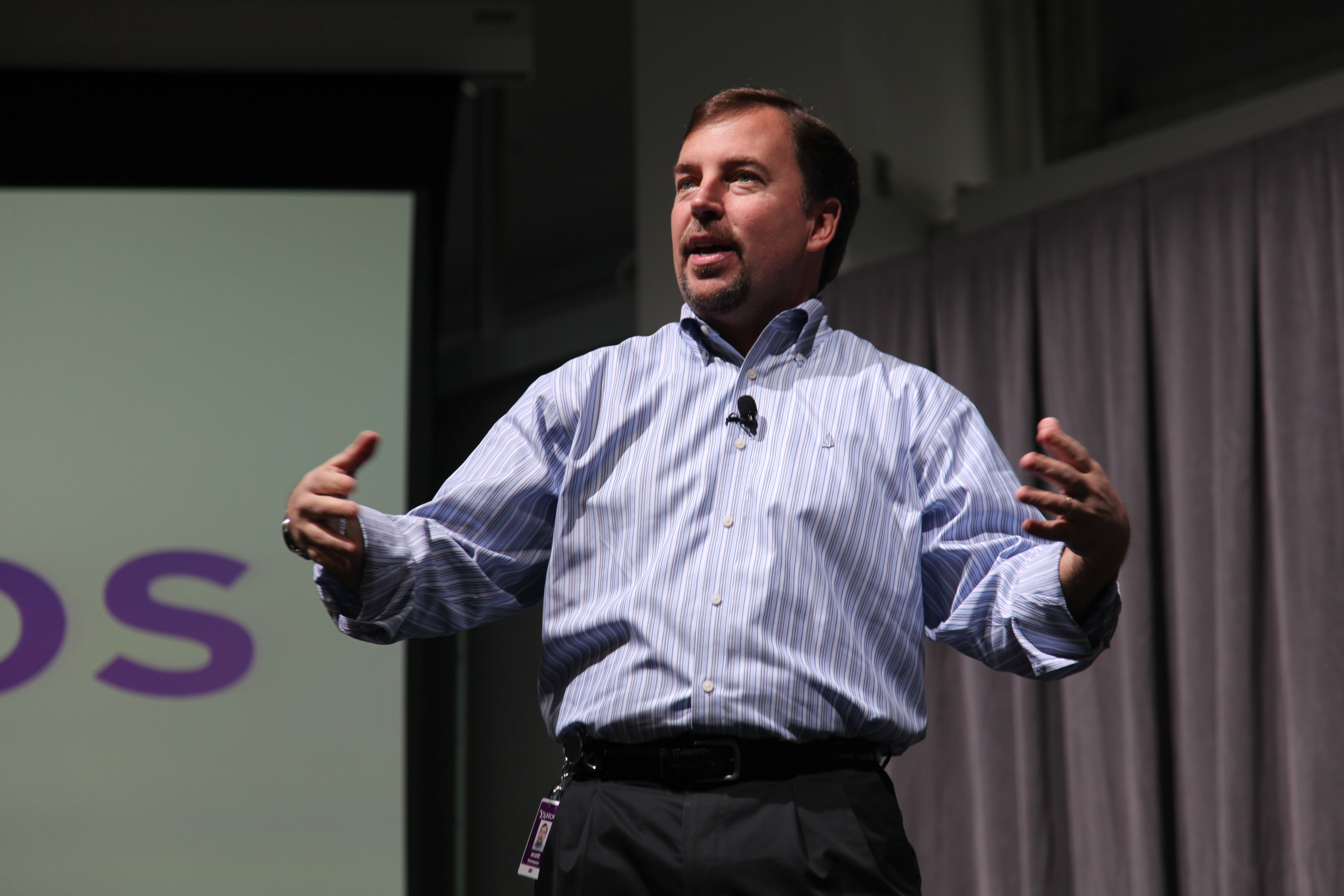
- Thompson greets Yahoo employees in January 2012
- Born: Scott Thompson; 13 November 1957 (age 68); Taunton, Massachusetts
- Education: Stonehill College (degree in Accounting)
- Occupation: Business executive
- Board member of: Kabbage Inc, Vertica Systems Inc, Zuora Inc.

Scott Thompson (born November 13, 1957) is an American businessman, and currently CEO of Tuition.io. Previously, he was chief executive officer of ShopRunner.

== Early life and education ==
Thompson was born November 13, 1957, in Taunton, Massachusetts, and grew up in nearby Raynham. He was an accounting major from Stonehill College, a private Catholic school in Easton, Massachusetts.

== Career ==
=== Visa ===
Thompson has also worked as executive vice president of Technology Solutions for Inovant, a subsidiary of Visa Inc. that oversees the company's global technology. At Inovant, he was responsible for all development, support, and maintenance of Visa's global payment system. He was also chief information officer at Barclays Global Investors, where he implemented a technology platform and global infrastructure, but was fired for alleged disagreements about strategy. In addition, he worked for Coopers & Lybrand, delivering information technology solutions to leading financial services clients such as Wells Fargo.

=== PayPal ===
Thompson started working for PayPal as senior vice president and chief technology officer, where he oversaw information technology, product development, and architecture. In 2008, he became the president of PayPal.

=== Yahoo! ===
Yahoo! hired Thompson as CEO in January 2012. In early April 2012, Thompson announced and executed a plan to reduce Yahoo!'s 14,000 employees by 2,000, or 14% of the workforce. Several executives left Yahoo! just before the layoffs began.

On March 14, 2012, Yahoo! filed a patent lawsuit against Facebook over ten patents. Facebook responded with a countersuit.

==== College degree controversy ====
On May 3, 2012, activist investor Dan Loeb, CEO of Third Point LLC, sent a letter to Yahoo's board of directors and made the contents of the letter public in a press release. The letter cites a Yahoo! SEC filing stating that Thompson "holds a Bachelor's degree in accounting and computer science" from Stonehill College and that Loeb had reason to believe that the degree was "in accounting only". Loeb questioned if Thompson had "embellished his academic credentials" and questioned if the board had "failed to exercise appropriate diligence and oversight in one of its most fundamental tasks – identifying and hiring the Chief Executive Officer." The basics of hiring the chief executive officer were subsequently overlooked.

Yahoo!'s filings with the SEC stated that Thompson "holds a Bachelor’s degree in accounting and computer science from Stonehill College". However, the 2008–10 proxy statements of eBay, Thompson's former employer, only noted an accounting degree. Yahoo! initially acknowledged the misstatement as "an inadvertent error", then subsequently began an investigation. Stonehill College responded to press inquiries by stating that Thompson was granted a B.S.B.A. degree in accounting.

On May 13, 2012, Yahoo! issued a press release stating that Thompson was no longer with the company, and would immediately be replaced on an interim basis by Ross Levinsohn, recently appointed head of Yahoo's new Media group.

=== ShopRunner ===
Thompson joined the online-shopping service ShopRunner as CEO in July 2012 and left in July 2016.

=== Awards ===
In 2011, Thompson received the Ernst & Young Entrepreneur of the Year Award for financial services for Northern California.

== Cancer diagnosis ==
In 2012, Thompson was diagnosed with thyroid cancer, which was said to be a reason for leaving Yahoo!. By July 2012, he was given a clean bill of health.

Business positions
Preceded by Tim Morse; Acting	Chief Executive Officer of Yahoo! 2012	Succeeded by Ross Levinsohn; Acting
