= Sue James =

Member of Yahoo board of directors

- Education: Hunter College; San Jose State University
- Occupation: Accountant

Sue James is an American accountant and since January 2010 is a member of the board of directors at Yahoo!. She was a Partner of Ernst & Young from 1987 until she retired in 2006.

She is a graduate of Hunter College and San Jose State University.
