= Liveops =

American telecommunications company

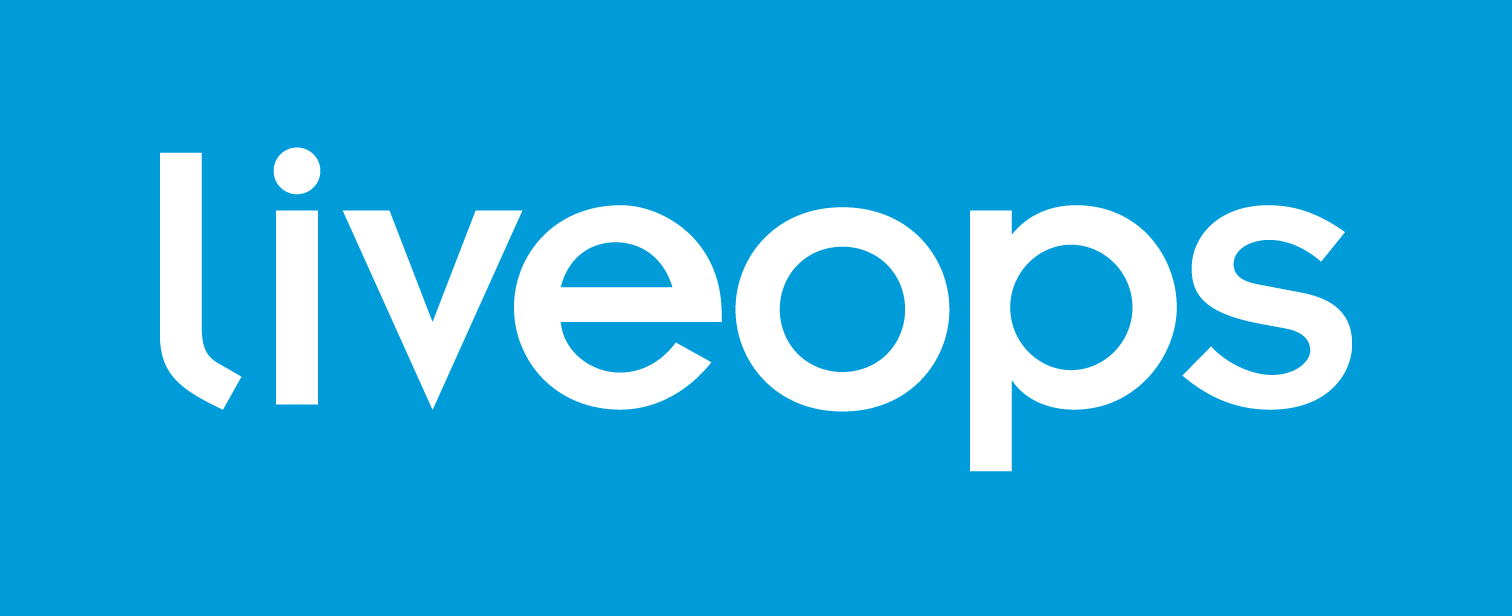
- Company type: Private
- Industry: Outsourcing; Customer Service
- Founded: 2000; 26 years ago
- Founders: Steve Doumar; Doug Feirstein
- Headquarters: Scottsdale, Arizona
- Area served: United States
- Key people: Greg Hanover, CEO
- Website: www.liveops.com

Liveops is an outsourcing and contact center company based in Scottsdale, Arizona. It was formed in 2000 by Steve Doumar and Doug Feirstein in Fort Lauderdale, Florida.

Liveops has been featured at an INSEAD Case Study at Harvard Business Review.

In 2003, Florida-based Liveops merged with California-based CallCast, renaming CallCast as Liveops, and moving its headquarters to Redwood City, California in 2004.
