= Wang Xiaoning =

Chinese dissident

- 王小宁
- Born: Shenyang, China
- Occupations: Engineer, Political Activist
- Known for: 2003-12 imprisonment for subversion, Yahoo! lawsuit
- Criminal charges: "Incitement to subvert state power"
- Criminal penalty: Imprisonment (10 Years)
- Criminal status: Released

Wang Xiaoning (simplified Chinese: 王小宁; traditional Chinese: 王小寧; pinyin: Wáng Xiǎoníng) is a Chinese engineer and dissident from Shenyang who was arrested by authorities of the People's Republic of China for publishing pro-democracy material online using his Yahoo! account. In September 2003, he was sentenced to ten years in prison.

In 2007, his wife filed a lawsuit against Yahoo! for providing Wang's private information to the authorities; the suit was settled out of court. Wang was released in August 2012.

== Arrest and imprisonment ==
In 2000 and 2001, Wang, who was an engineer by profession, posted electronic journals in a Yahoo! group calling for democratic reform and an end to single-party rule. He was arrested in September 2002, after Yahoo! assisted Chinese authorities by providing information used to identify him. In September 2003, Wang was convicted of a charge of "incitement to subvert state power" and sentenced to ten years in prison.

== Lawsuit against Yahoo! ==
On 18 April 2007, Xiaoning's wife Yu Ling and the World Organization for Human Rights USA sued Yahoo! under the Alien Torts Statute (28 U.S.C. § 1350) and Torture Victim Protection Act of 1991 (TVPA), 106 Stat. 73 (1992) in federal court in San Francisco, California, United States. Described as potentially "an important test case", the suit was one of the first attempts to hold a corporation responsible for overseas human rights violations. President George W. Bush's administration opposed the suit.

Wang Xiaoning was named as a plaintiff in the Yahoo! suit, as was Shi Tao, a Chinese journalist detained and convicted on state security charges for emailing a description of the Chinese government's instructions to journalists for the upcoming anniversary of the 1989 Tiananmen Square protests and massacre. Shi had also been identified by information provided by Yahoo! The World Organization for Human Rights USA executive director, Morton Sklar, stated: "Yahoo is guilty of 'an act of corporate irresponsibility ... Yahoo had reason to know that if they provided China with identification information that those individuals would be arrested."

After unsuccessfully seeking to have the suit dismissed, Yahoo! settled out of court for an undisclosed sum.

== Release ==
Wang Xiaoning was released from prison on 31 August 2012. On his release he was informed of political and communications restrictions to which he is required to conform. His wife described him as in "relatively good" condition, but said he was "a little frail and gasping".

== See also ==
- Human rights in the People's Republic of China
- Internet censorship in the People's Republic of China
- Jiang Lijun
- Li Zhi
- List of Chinese dissidents
