= Shi Tao (journalist) =

Chinese dissident

- 师涛
- Born: July 25, 1968 (age 58); Yanchi County, Ningxia, China
- Education: East China Normal University
- Occupation: Journalist
- Known for: 2004 arrest and imprisonment
- Criminal charges: "leaking state secrets"
- Criminal penalty: Imprisonment (10 Years)
- Criminal status: Released (Served 8.5 Years)
- Awards: CPJ International Press Freedom Award (2005); Golden Pen of Freedom Award (2006)

Shi Tao (simplified Chinese: 师涛; traditional Chinese: 師濤; pinyin: Shī Tāo; born July 25, 1968) is a Chinese journalist, writer and poet, who in 2005 was sentenced to 10 years in prison for releasing a document of the Chinese Communist Party (CCP) to an overseas Chinese democracy site. Yahoo! China was later discovered to have facilitated his arrest by providing his personal details to the Chinese government. Yahoo! was subsequently rebuked by a panel of the U.S. Congress, settled a lawsuit by Shi's family out of court, and pledged to reform its practices.

Shi won two major international journalism awards after his arrest: the CPJ International Press Freedom Award and the Golden Pen of Freedom Award. On September 5, 2013, Shi Tao was released from prison. He received an 18-month reduction in sentencing after spending 8 1/2 years in prison. He lives in Yinchuan, Ningxia, with his mother.

== Background ==
Shi Tao was born in Yanchi County, Wuzhong, Ningxia, in China in 1968. According to Liu Xiaobo, Shi became active in the democracy movement around the time of the 1989 Tiananmen Square protests and massacre. In July 1991, he received a degree from Shanghai's East China Normal University. He married the following year.

Prior to his arrest, Shi was an editor at Dangdai Shang Bao ("Contemporary Trade News"), a newspaper in Changsha, in Hunan Province.

== Arrest and imprisonment ==
On April 20, 2004, Shi received a document from CCP which instructed journalists not to report on the upcoming fifteenth anniversary of the "June 4th event", the Tiananmen Square massacre. The document warned of infiltration and sabotage by foreigners and Falun Gong, and stated that media members must "correctly direct public opinion" and "never release any opinions that are inconsistent with central policies". Shi used a Yahoo! Mail account to send an anonymous post to a Chinese-language website based in New York that described the communication.

At the request of the Chinese government, Yahoo! provided records confirming that Shi's account had sent the e-mail. Shi was unofficially detained on November 24, 2004, and on December 14, he was officially arrested under state security laws on a charge of leaking state secrets. During Shi's trial, his lawyer contended that his punishment should be light as the disclosure of the information had not caused great harm to China. In June, he was sentenced to ten years' imprisonment by the Changsha Intermediate People's Court.

Shi's appeal to the Hunan Province High People's Court was rejected without a hearing. Shi's mother Gao Qinsheng filed a request for a review of the appeal on his behalf in August 2005. The appeal was unsuccessful, and Shi was meanwhile sent to Chishan Prison and assigned to forced labor. He began to suffer from respiratory problems, and in April 2006, also developed an ulcer and heart problems. In June 2007, he was given a medical transfer to Deshan Prison, where he worked in the machinery plant, and his health reportedly improved. According to Amnesty International, Shi's mother, brother and uncle were also harassed following his arrest, and his wife was repeatedly interrogated and pressured to divorce him, which she eventually did.

During the 2008 Summer Olympics torch relay PEN International arranged for Shi's poem "June" to be translated into more than 60 languages, creating a virtual relay protesting against Shi's imprisonment. Shi's imprisonment was also protested by several international NGOs. Amnesty International designated him a prisoner of conscience and called for his immediate release. The Congressional-Executive Commission on China describes him as a political prisoner. Reporters Without Borders launched a petition calling for his release, while the Committee to Protect Journalists described itself as "outraged" by the arrest. Human Rights Watch called him an imprisoned "human rights defender" and campaigned for his release.

== Yahoo!'s role ==
The incident sparked a controversy about the business practices of Yahoo!, the Hong Kong arm of which provided technical information connecting the message and email account with Shi Tao's computer. Yahoo! was criticized by Reporters Without Borders for acting as a "police informant". Yahoo! was first called to testify about the incident to the House Foreign Affairs Committee of the United States Congress in 2006.

In August 2007, Congress began an investigation into Yahoo!'s handling of the case, with Yahoo! co-founder Jerry Yang testifying in another hearing before Congress. The congressional panel found that Yahoo!'s 2006 testimony, in which a Yahoo! executive had wrongly claimed the company had been unaware of the reason for China's request for information, had been "inexcusably negligent behaviour at best, and deliberately deceptive behaviour at worst". Chairman Tom Lantos told Yang to "beg the forgiveness" of Shi's mother, who was attending the hearing, and stated that "Much of this testimony reveals that while technologically and financially you are giants, morally you are pygmies". Representative Christopher H. Smith stated that there was a "parallel" between Yahoo's actions in the case and businesses that helped Nazi Germany locate Jews during the Holocaust. Yang apologized to Shi's mother and stated that he didn't think any Yahoo! employee "was trying to do anything wrong" and that the company was committed to "protecting and promoting free expression and privacy". He testified that the company was also collaborating with human rights organizations on an industry code of conduct to protect human rights. Yang later met with Shi's family.

Also in 2007, the World Organization for Human Rights filed a lawsuit in San Francisco against Yahoo! for allegedly providing information (emails and IP addresses) to the Chinese government that caused the arrests of journalists Shi Tao and Wang Xiaoning. After unsuccessfully seeking to have the suit dismissed, Yahoo! settled out of court for an undisclosed sum.

Prior to a trip by U.S. Secretary of State Condoleezza Rice to China in February 2008, Yang appealed to her to "actively pursue the release of Shi Tao, Wang Xiaoning and other Chinese dissidents who have been imprisoned for exercising internationally recognized rights of expression".

== Awards and recognition ==
On October 18, 2005, the Committee to Protect Journalists announced that Shi was one of four winners of the 2005 CPJ International Press Freedom Awards. The committee's website stated that he would be officially presented with the award when he is released from prison.

In March 2006, he was given the Vasyl Stus Award, named for the Ukrainian dissident and awarded for "talent and courage". On November 28, 2006, he was named the winner of the Golden Pen of Freedom Award of the World Association of Newspapers. The award was accepted on his behalf by his mother. In 2009, Human Rights Watch awarded Shi a Hellman/Hammett grant, which recognizes "commitment to free expression" and "courage in the face of political persecution".

== See also ==
- Internet censorship in the People's Republic of China
- Jiang Lijun
- Li Zhi
- List of Chinese dissidents
