= List of mergers and acquisitions by Yahoo =

Yahoo! logo

Yahoo! Inc. is a computer software and web search engine company founded on March 1, 1995. The company is a public corporation and its headquarters is located in Sunnyvale, California. It was founded by Stanford University graduate students Jerry Yang and David Filo in 1994. According to web traffic analysis companies, Yahoo has been one of the most visited websites on the Internet, with more than 130 million unique users per month in the United States alone.

Yahoo's first acquisition was the purchase of Net Controls, a web search engine company, in September 1997 for US$1.4 million. As of April 2008, the company's largest acquisition is the purchase of Broadcast.com, an Internet radio company, for $5.7 billion, making Broadcast.com co-founder Mark Cuban a billionaire. Most of the companies acquired by Yahoo are based in the United States; 78 of the companies are from the United States, and 15 are based in a foreign country. As of July 2015, the first incarnation of Yahoo had acquired 114 companies, with Polyvore being the latest.

In 2017, the first incarnation Yahoo! Inc. was purchased by Verizon Communications and merged with AOL. In May 2021, Verizon sold a majority stake in the combined company, then called Verizon Media, to Apollo Global Management, who restored the Yahoo! name.

== Acquisitions (1998 - 2017) ==
Date	Company	Business	Country	Value (USD)	Adjusted (USD)	Derived products	References
September 1997	Net Controls	Web search engine	USA	$1,400,000	$3,000,000	Yahoo! Search	
October 8, 1997	Four11	Web-based email	USA	$92,000,000	$185,000,000	Yahoo! Mail	
March 31, 1998	Classic Games	Online game	USA	—	—	Yahoo! Games	
April 29, 1998	Sportasy	Fantasy sport	USA	—	—	Yahoo! Fantasy Sports	
June 8, 1998	Viaweb	Web application	USA	$48,600,000	$96,000,000	Yahoo! Store	
July 17, 1998	Webcal	Calendaring software	USA	$21,000,000	$41,000,000	Yahoo Calendar	
October 12, 1998	Yoyodyne	Direct marketing	USA	$29,600,000	$58,000,000	Yahoo! Search Marketing	
December 1998	Hyperparallel	Data analysis	USA	$8,100,000	$16,000,000	Yahoo! Search	
April 1, 1999	Broadcast.com	Internet radio	USA	$5.7×10^{9}	$1.1016×10^{10}	Yahoo! Music Radio (defunct)	
May 27, 1999	Encompass	Internet service provider	USA	$130,000,000	$251,000,000	Yahoo!	
May 28, 1999	GeoCities	Web hosting service	USA	$3.6×10^{9}	$6.958×10^{9}	Yahoo! GeoCities	
June 2, 1999	Online Anywhere	Content delivery network	USA	$80,000,000	$155,000,000	Yahoo! TV	
March 23, 2000	Arthas.com	E-commerce payment systems	USA	—	—	Yahoo! Store	
April 5, 2000	MyQuest	Internet service provider	USA	—	—	Yahoo!	
June 30, 2000	VivaSmart	E-commerce	USA	$8,900,000	$17,000,000	Yahoo! Shopping	
August 31, 2000	eGroups	Electronic mailing list	USA	$432,000,000	$808,000,000	Yahoo! Groups	
November 9, 2000	Kimo	Web portal	TWN	$30,000,000	$56,000,000	Yahoo! Kimo	
February 14, 2001	Sold.com.au	Online auction tools	AUS	$30,000,000	$55,000,000	Yahoo! Shopping	
June 28, 2001	LAUNCH Media	Online music store	USA	$12,000,000	$22,000,000	Yahoo! Music	
February 12, 2002	Hotjobs.com	Job search engine	USA	$436,000,000	$780,000,000	Yahoo! HotJobs	
December 23, 2002	Inktomi Corporation	Internet service provider	USA	$235,000,000	$421,000,000	Yahoo! Search	
June 14, 2003	Overture Services, Inc.	Search engine marketing	USA	$1.63×10^{9}	$2.853×10^{9}	Yahoo! Search Marketing	
January 2004	3721 Internet Assistant	Browser helper object	CHN	$120,000,000	$205,000,000	Yahoo! Assistant	
March 26, 2004	Kelkoo	Price comparison service	EU	$579,000,000	$987,000,000	Kelkoo	
July 12, 2004	Oddpost	Web-based email	USA	$30,000,000	$51,000,000	Yahoo! Mail	
September 14, 2004	Musicmatch Jukebox	Audio player	USA	$160,000,000	$273,000,000	Yahoo! Music	
October 2, 2004	The All-Seeing Eye	Game server browser	EU	—	—	Yahoo! Games	
October 22, 2004	Stata Labs	Web-based email	USA	—	—	Yahoo! Mail	
December 7, 2004	WUF Networks	Mobile media	USA	—	—	Yahoo! Mobile	
February 11, 2005	Verdisoft	Wireless data sharing	USA	$58,000,000	$96,000,000	Yahoo! Mobile	
March 4, 2005	Stadeon	Online game	USA	—	—	Yahoo! Games	
March 20, 2005	Ludicorp	Image hosting service	CAN	$40,000,000	$66,000,000	Flickr	
April 12, 2005	TeRespondo	Advertising network	BRA	—	—	Yahoo! Search Marketing	
June 14, 2005	Dialpad	Voice over Internet Protocol	USA	—	—	Yahoo! Voice	
June 14, 2005	blo.gs	Weblog software	USA	—	—	Yahoo! 360°	
July 25, 2005	Konfabulator	Widget engine	USA	—	—	Yahoo! Widgets	
October 4, 2005	Upcoming.org	Calendaring software	USA	—	—	Yahoo! Local	
October 18, 2005	Whereonearth	Web mapping	UK	—	—	Yahoo! Search Marketing	
December 12, 2005	del.icio.us	Social bookmarking	USA	$20,000,000	$33,000,000	del.icio.us	
January 9, 2006	Webjay	Online music store	USA	—	—	Yahoo! Music	
January 17, 2006	SearchFox	Web search engine	USA	—	—	Yahoo! Search	
April 18, 2006	Meedio	Digital video recorder	USA	—	—	Yahoo! Go	
September 27, 2006	Jumpcut.com	Online video editing	USA	—	—	Yahoo! Video	
October 17, 2006	AdInterax	Online advertising	USA	—	—	Yahoo! Search Marketing	
November 16, 2006	Bix.com	Social media	USA	—	—	Bix	
November 17, 2006	Kenet Works	Mobile software	EU	$25,000,000	$40,000,000	Yahoo! Mobile	
December 2006	Wretch	Virtual community	TWN	$22,000,000	$35,000,000	Wretch	
January 8, 2007	MyBlogLog	Social network service	USA	—	—	MyBlogLog	
April 29, 2007	Right Media	Online advertising	USA	$850,000,000	$1.320×10^{9}	Yahoo! Search Marketing	
June 20, 2007	Rivals.com	College sports	USA	—	—	Yahoo! Sports	
September 4, 2007	BlueLithium	Advertising network	USA	$300,000,000	$466,000,000	Yahoo! Search Marketing	
September 14, 2007	BuzzTracker	News site	USA	—	—	Yahoo! News	
September 17, 2007	Zimbra	Collaborative software, Office Suite	USA	$350,000,000	$543,000,000	Zimbra	
February 5, 2008	FoxyTunes	Browser extension	USA	—	—	FoxyTunes	
February 12, 2008	Maven Networks	Video on demand	USA	$160,000,000	$239,000,000	Yahoo! Video	
May 9, 2008	Inquisitor	Browser extension	USA	—	—	Inquisitor	
July 22, 2009	Xoopit	Webmail applications	USA	$20,000,000	$30,000,000	Yahoo! Mail	
August 25, 2009	Maktoob.com	Social media	JOR	$167,000,000	$251,000,000	Maktoob.com	
March 17, 2010	citizensports.com	Sports social media	USA	—	—	citizensports.com	
May 18, 2010	Associated Content	Content farm	USA	$100,000,000	$148,000,000	Associated Content	
May 25, 2010	Koprol	Geosocial network	IDN	—	—	Koprol	
October 4, 2010	Dapper	SmartAds	ISR	$55,000,000	$81,000,000	Dapper	
January 20, 2011	Spreets	Daily deals	AUS	$40,000,000	$57,000,000	Spreets	
April 25, 2011	IntoNow	Recognize TV content	USA	$20,000,000	$29,000,000	IntoNow	
November 1, 2011	Interclick	Data driven advertising	USA	$270,000,000	$386,000,000	Yahoo! Ad Network	
October 25, 2012	Stamped	Social recommendation	USA	—	—	Yahoo! Mobile	
December 4, 2012	OnTheAir	OnTheAir	USA	—	—	IntoNow	
January 22, 2013	Snip.it	Social network	USA	$10,000,000	$14,000,000	Snip.it	
February 12, 2013	Alike	Social recommendation	USA	—	—	Yahoo! Mobile	
March 20, 2013	Jybe	Social recommendation	USA	—	—	Jybe	
March 25, 2013	Summly	News aggregation, summarization	UK	$30,000,000	$41,000,000	Yahoo App	
May 1, 2013	Astrid	Productivity	USA	—	—	Astrid	
May 9, 2013	GoPollGo	Real-time surveys	USA	—	—	Yahoo Mobile Properties and Apps	
May 9, 2013	MileWise	Flight rewards management	USA	—	—	Yahoo Mobile Properties and Apps	
May 10, 2013	Loki Studios	Mobile gaming	USA	—	—	Yahoo Mobile Properties and Apps	
May 17, 2013	Tumblr	Blogging	USA	$1.1×10^{9}	$1.520×10^{9}		
May 23, 2013	PlayerScale	Online gaming	USA	—	—	Yahoo Mobile Properties and Apps	
June 12, 2013	GhostBird Software	Mobile photography apps	USA	—	—	Yahoo Mobile Properties and Apps	
June 13, 2013	Rondee	Video conferencing	USA	—	—	—	
July 2, 2013	Bignoggins Productions	Fantasy sports	USA	—	—	—	
July 2, 2013	Qwiki	Automated video production	USA	$50,000,000	$69,000,000	—	
July 3, 2013	Xobni	CRM	USA	$68,000,000	$94,000,000	—	
July 18, 2013	Ztelic	Social analytics	CHN	—	—	—	
July 31, 2013	Lexity	E-commerce analytics	USA	$35,000,000	$48,000,000	—	
August 2, 2013	Rockmelt	News aggregator	USA	—	—	—	
August 23, 2013	IQ Engines	Image recognition	USA	—	—	Flickr	
September 30, 2013	Hitpost	Sports	USA	—	—	—	
October 11, 2013	Bread	Advertising	USA	—	—	—	
October 23, 2013	LookFlow	Image recognition	USA	—	—	Flickr	
December 2, 2013	SkyPhrase	Natural language processing	—	—	—	—	
December 3, 2013	Ptch	Video sharing	USA	$6,500,000	$9,000,000	—	
December 6, 2013	EvntLive	Live and on-demand music playing	USA	—	—	—	
December 9, 2013	Quik.io	Cross-platform video streaming	USA	—	—	—	
December 17, 2013	PeerCDN	Content delivery network	USA	—	—	—	
January 7, 2014	Aviate	Intelligent homescreen for the Android OS	USA	—	—	—	
January 21, 2014	SPARQ	Mobile marketing	USA	—	—	—	
January 24, 2014	Cloud Party	Virtual world gaming	—	—	—	—	
January 28, 2014	Tomfoolery	Conversation platform	USA	—	—	—	
January 30, 2014	Incredible Labs	Time management app	USA	—	—	—	
February 11, 2014	Wander	Social diary	USA	—	—	—	
February 13, 2014	Distill	Technical recruiting	USA	—	—	—	
March 5, 2014	Vizify	Social media information transformation	USA	—	—	—	
May 13, 2014	Blink	Mobile messaging	USA	—	—	—	
June 10, 2014	PhotoDrive	Photo management	USA	—	—	—	
July 12, 2014	RayV	Video streaming platform	ISR	—	—	—	
July 21, 2014	Flurry	Mobile analytics	USA	$200,000,000	$272,000,000	—	
August 15, 2014	ClarityRay	Ad security	ISR	—	—	—	
September 5, 2014	Luminate	Advertising	USA	—	—	—	
September 22, 2014	Bookpad	Document handling	IND	$15,000,000	$20,000,000	—	
October 4, 2014	MessageMe	Messaging app	USA	—	—	Yahoo! Livetext	
November 11, 2014	BrightRoll	Online video advertising	USA	$640,000,000	$870,000,000	—	
November 21, 2014	Cooliris	Photo viewing	USA	—	—	—	
December 11, 2014	Media Group One	Advertising and online video	GER	—	—	—	
July 31, 2015	Polyvore	Clothing e-commerce website	USA	$160,000,000	$217,000,000	—	

== Acquisitions (2021 - present) ==
Date	Company	Business	Country	Value (USD)	Adjusted (USD)	Derived products	References
September 6, 2022	The Factual	News rating service	USA	—	—	Yahoo! News	
April 25, 2023	Wagr	Sports betting app	USA	—	—	Yahoo! Sports	
August 23, 2023	Commonstock	Financial social platform	USA	—	—	Yahoo! Finance	
August 28, 2023	StrictlyVC	Tech publication	USA	—	—	TechCrunch	
April 3, 2024	Artifact	AI news app	USA	—	—	Yahoo! News	

== See also ==
- List of largest mergers and acquisitions
- Lists of corporate acquisitions and mergers
