= List of Yahoo-owned sites and services =

Current and former media and business sites

Yahoo!, once one of the most popular web sites in the United States, is as of September 2021 a content sub-division of the namesake company Yahoo Inc., owned by Apollo Global Management (90%) and Verizon Communications (10%). It has offered a wide range of online sites and services since its inception in 1994, a majority of which are now defunct.

== Current Yahoo! services ==
Yahoo offers a multi-lingual interface available in over 20 languages. Yahoo! Japan is a separate entity, controlled by SoftBank. Yahoo!Xtra, launched in 2007 in New Zealand is owned by Yahoo!7, a joint venture between Yahoo! and the Seven Network.

- Yahoo! home page
- Yahoo! Auctions – discontinued in 2007 except for Taiwan and Japan.
- Yahoo! Developer Network
- Yahoo! Entertainment (also branded Y! Entertainment)
- Yahoo! Finance
- Yahoo! Life – formerly known as Yahoo! Lifestyle
- Yahoo! Mail
- Yahoo! Native – formerly known as Yahoo! Advertising, Yahoo! Search Marketing and Yahoo! Gemini, it provides online advertising services.
- Yahoo! News
- Yahoo! Plus – a collection of individual subscriptions: Yahoo! Mail Plus, Yahoo! Finance Plus, Yahoo! Fantasy Plus, Yahoo! Plus Protect Home, Yahoo! Plus Protect Mobile, Yahoo! Plus Secure and Yahoo! Plus Support
- Yahoo! Research – formerly known as Yahoo! Labs
- Yahoo! Search
- Yahoo! Shopping – a price comparison service
- Yahoo! Sports
- Yahoo! Weather

== Defunct Yahoo! services ==
- Rivals.com - A network of websites that focus mainly on college football and basketball recruiting in the United States; sold on April 30, 2025, to On3.com.
- My Yahoo! – Enabled users to combine their favorite Yahoo features, content feeds, and information onto a single webpage; shut down in December 2024
- Yahoo! 360° – A social networking service and blog host; launched in March 2005 and shut down in 2009. Yahoo! 360° Plus Vietnam's was shut down in 2012.
- Yahoo! Accessibility Lab – Improved access to the Internet for the disabled community.
- AdInterax – An online advertising company acquired in October 2006.
- Yahoo! Answers – A community-driven question-and-answer (Q&A) website discontinued in May 2021.
- APT from Yahoo! – An online advertising platform launched in September 2008.
- Arthas.com – An e-commerce payment system; acquired on March 23, 2000.
- Astrid – A task management application for Android; acquired in May 2013 and shut down on August 5, 2013.
- Ask Yahoo! – A Q&A platform that was shut down in March 2006 due to the release of Yahoo! Answers. On May 16, 2013, a new version of Ask Yahoo was launched.
- Yahoo! Assistant – A browser helper object that blocks pop-up ads for Internet Explorer developed by Beijing 3721 Technology, which was acquired in 2004.
- Yahoo! Autos – A car buying and search engine with content from autoblog.com; shut down in 2016.
- Yahoo! Avatars – Allowed users to create avatars for display on Yahoo Messenger and Yahoo! Answers; shut down on April 1, 2013.
- Yahoo! Aviate – Provided contextually relevant information on Android home screens; it was acquired in 2014 and shut down on March 8, 2018.
- Yahoo! Axis – A browser extension and mobile browser launched in May 2012 and discontinued June 28, 2013.
- Yahoo! Babel Fish – A translation service; shut down in May 2012 and replaced by Bing Translator.
- Bix – A website that provided tools for the creation of contests; acquired by Yahoo on November 16, 2006, and shut down on June 30, 2009.
- blo.gs – A directory of blogs; acquired in June 2005 and sold to Automattic, parent of WordPress.com in April 2009.
- Yahoo! Briefcase – A free file-hosting service; shut down on March 30, 2009.
- Yahoo! Buzz – A community-based news article service that allowed users to publish news stories; shut down on April 21, 2011. MyBlogLog was discontinued on May 24, 2011.
- Yahoo! China shut down on September 2, 2013, and was redirected to taobao.com.
- Y!Connect – Enabled individuals to leave comments in Internet forums via their Yahoo ID.
- del.icio.us – A social bookmarking website; acquired on December 9, 2005, and sold to AVOS, owned by YouTube founders Chad Hurley and Steve Chen, on April 27, 2011.
- Yahoo! Directory – A web directory which at one time rivaled DMOZ in size and was the first product by Yahoo!; shut down in December 2014.
- Fire Eagle – A location brokerage service created by Yahoo Brickhouse; launched in March 2008. Shut down in February 2013.
- FoxyTunes – A browser extension that allowed users to control media players from the browser window; shut down on July 1, 2013.
- Yahoo! Gallery – A directory of application software built by third-party developers using Yahoo! technologies; shut down on July 14, 2009.
- Yahoo! Games – Allowed users to play games, such as chess, billiards, checkers and backgammon; launched upon acquisition of ClassicGames.com in 1997, shut down in 2016. Yahoo launched a new Yahoo! Games section in 2023, but only for the United States.
- Yahoo! GeoCities was a popular web hosting service founded in 1995 and was one of the first services to offer web pages to the public. In 1998, it was the third-most-browsed website. Yahoo acquired GeoCities in 1999 and shut it down in 2009, deleting 7 million web pages. Many of those web pages are available at mirror sites such as the Internet Archive and OOCities.org.
- Yahoo! GeoPlanet – Offered geographic information services both directly and via third-party applications; shut down in August 2016.
- Yahoo! Go – A Java-based phone application with access to most of Yahoo! services; shut down on January 12, 2010.
- Yahoo! Green – News, ideas, and discussion about ways to promote an environmentally conscious lifestyle; shut down in 2012.
- Yahoo! Greetings – An e-card service. Redirected to American Greetings.
- Yahoo! Groups – One of the largest collections of online discussion boards; shut down on December 15, 2020. The Yahoo! Groups web address now redirects to the main Yahoo! page.
- Yahoo! Homes – Offered real estate-related news, home prices.
- Yahoo! HotJobs – An employment website; acquired by Monster.com for $225 million in 2010 and shut down by Monster.com in 2011.
- IntoNow from Yahoo! – Gave users the ability to almost instantly recognize TV content; acquired in Spring 2011 and shut down in March 2014.
- Yahoo! Indonesia – the Indonesian affiliate of Yahoo!, founded in 2010. Its headquarters was Jakarta, Indonesia.
- Jumpcut.com – A service where the uploaded photos and videos can be edited online; shut down in June 2009.
- Kelkoo Group – A European price comparison tool that was acquired by Yahoo! in 2004 and sold in 2008.
- Yahoo! Korea was the South Korean affiliate of Yahoo!, founded in September 1997. Its headquarters was the Yahoo! Tower on Teheranno in the Gangnam District of Seoul. On December 31, 2012, Yahoo! Korea shut down all its services and the website was redirected to the main Yahoo! search page.
- Koprol – An Indonesian social networking service, allowing users to connect based on location. Shut down in August 2012.
- Yahoo! Kickstart – A professional network targeting college students, recent grads, employers, professionals, and alumni. Shut down in December 2008 amid reports of server downtime and error messages. Users were redirected to Yahoo! HotJobs as an alternative for jobseekers. Kickstart's URL now directs to an error message.
- Yahoo! Kids – A children's version of the Yahoo! portal, it offered online safety tips and parental controls; shut down in April 2013 due to declining popularity.
- Yahoo! Live – Allowed users to broadcast videos in real time; shut down on December 3, 2008.
- Yahoo! Maktoob – A pan-regional, Arabic-language hosting and social networking service acquired by Yahoo! on August 25, 2009; shut down on October 28, 2022.
- Yahoo! Maps – Online mapping portal; shut down on June 30, 2015.
- Yahoo! Mash – A social networking service that allowed other users to edit any page; shut down on September 28, 2008.
- Yahoo! Media Player / Web Player – A computer based media player that was based on Microsoft's Windows Media Player and was similar to other competing media players such as MusicMatch or Winamp.
- Yahoo! Meme – A beta social networking service, similar to Twitter; shut down on May 25, 2012.
- Yahoo! Messenger – An instant messaging app; shut down on July 17, 2018.
- Yahoo! Mobile – Former carrier in the United States; shut down on August 31, 2021. Users were advised to switch to Visible instead.
- Yahoo! Movies
- Yahoo! Music – Provided Internet radio, music videos, news, artist information, and original programming; shut down in September 2018 and consolidated into Yahoo! Entertainment's "Music" section.
- Yahoo! Music Unlimited and Yahoo! Music Jukebox – Acquired from MusicMatch; sold to Rhapsody (now Napster) on October 31, 2008.
- Yahoo! Next – An incubation ground for future Yahoo technologies.
- Yahoo! OMG – An online tabloid with most content provided by Access Hollywood and X17; shut down on January 6, 2014.
- oneSearch – A privacy-focused search engine
- Panama – An online advertising platform.
- Yahoo! Personals – An online dating service with both free and paid versions; shut down in July 2010.
- Yahoo! Philippines – The localized website of Yahoo! primarily catering to the Philippine market. It was launched on April 25, 2006. The Yahoo! Philippines homepage was redirected to Yahoo! Singapore on June 2, 2015. However, in May 2017, Yahoo! Philippines returned with its newly redesigned homepage along with updates to Yahoo! News.
- Yahoo! Photos – A photo sharing service similar to Flickr, which Yahoo acquired; shut down on September 20, 2007.
- Yahoo! Pipes – A free RSS mashup visual editor and hosting service; shut down on September 30, 2015.
- Yahoo! Podcasts – A beta service that allowed users to search for and view podcasts; discontinued in November 2007.
- Yahoo! Profile / Yahoo Pulse – A directory of Yahoo users with their personal information.
- Yahoo! Publisher Network – An advertising network that only accepted US based publishers; shut down on April 30, 2010. Users were referred to the Chitika ad network (which is now defunct itself).
- RocketMail – An email service acquired in 1997. Incorporated into Yahoo! Mail in 2013. The RocketMail page now redirects to the Yahoo! Mail login page.
- Yahoo! Screen (formerly Yahoo! Video) – A video sharing website; shut down in January 2016.
- Yahoo! Labs – A Yahoo! technology division as Yahoo!’s research arm. It was replaced by Yahoo! Research on February 17, 2016.
- Yahoo! Search BOSS – A service that allowed developers to build search applications based on Yahoo's search technology.
- Yahoo! SearchMonkey – Allowed developers and site owners to use structured data to make Yahoo Search results more useful and visually appealing, and drive more relevant traffic to their sites; shut down in October 2010 as part of the Microsoft and Yahoo search partnership.
- Shine – A site tailored for women between the ages of 25 and 54. Launched On March 31, 2008. It was shut down in 2014.
- Yahoo! Site Explorer – Allowed users to view information on websites in Yahoo!'s search index; shut down on November 21, 2011.
- Yahoo! Small Business – A service offered by the Yahoo! to get users start up and expand their business online; rebranded as Verizon Small Business Essentials in 2021.
- Yahoo! Smart TV – a Smart TV platform developed by Yahoo!; discontinued in 2018.
- Yahoo! Smush.it – Optimized digital images by removing unnecessary bytes and reducing file size; shut down in April 2015.
- Yahoo! Tech – Offered reviews and advice for buying and using electronics; integrated into Yahoo News in 2016.
- Yahoo! Transliteration – An online translator.
- Yahoo! Travel – A travel-booking website; shut down in February 2016.
- Upcoming – A social event calendar acquired in October 2005; shut down in April 2013.
- Yahoo! Widgets – A cross-platform desktop widget runtime environment; shut down in March 2012.
- Yahoo! Web Analytics – Web analytics tools; formerly IndexTools was acquired by Yahoo! in 2008 and re-branded; discontinued in 2012.
- Wretch – A Taiwanese social networking service acquired by Yahoo in July 2007; shut down in December 2013.
- Yahoo! Voice – A Voice over IP service formerly known as Dialpad; shut down on January 30, 2013.
- Yahoo! Voices – Formerly Associated Content (AC), distributed writing through its website and content partners, including Yahoo! News; shut down July 31, 2014.
