= Inquisitor (disambiguation) =

An inquisitor was an official in an Inquisition led by the Roman Catholic Church.

Inquisitor may also refer to:

== Fictional characters ==
- Imperial Inquisitor, fictional characters within Star Wars who are Force-sensitive beings that work for Darth Vader and form Emperor Palpatine's Inquisitorius
  - Grand Inquisitor (Star Wars), a fictional character from Star Wars Rebels and leader of the Inquisitorius in the Star Wars Expanded Universe.
- Inquisitor (Doctor Who), a Time Lord featured throughout the twenty-third season of Doctor Who.
- Hogwarts High Inquisitor (Harry Potter), an ad hoc post held by the character Dolores Umbridge.
- The Inquisitor (Red Dwarf), the title character of the Red Dwarf episode of the same name.
- The Inquisitor, a character from Warhammer 40,000: Inquisitor – Martyr.
- The Inquisitor, the player character in Dragon Age: Inquisition.

== Biology ==
- Inquisitor (genus), a sea snail genus in the family Pseudomelatomidae
- Calosoma inquisitor, a ground beetle species found in northern Africa, Europe and Asia

== Software ==
- Inquisitor (hardware testing software), a Linux-based diagnostic software suite
- Inquisitor (search software), a search tool for Safari, Firefox, Internet Explorer and iPhone
- Inquisitor (video game), a 2009 role-playing game developed by Cinemax
- The Inquisitor (video game), a 2024 action-adventure video game

== Others ==
- The Inquisitor (play), a 1797 play by Thomas Holcroft
- Inquisitor (tabletop game), a tabletop game set in the fictional Warhammer 40,000 universe
- Inquisitor (magazine), a game magazine published by Armorcast about Warhammer 40,000
- "The Inquisitor" (Red Dwarf), an episode of the TV series, or the episode's title character
- The Inquisitor, an alternate title for the 1981 French film Garde à Vue
- The Inquisitor, an alternate title for the 1990 American film The Pit and the Pendulum
- "Inquisitor", a song by Raven from All for One
- Inquisitorial system, a legal system where the court or a part of the court is actively involved in determining the facts of the case

== See also ==
- Grand Inquisitor, the lead official of the Inquisition
- "The Grand Inquisitor", a parable related in Fyodor Dostoevsky's novel The Brothers Karamazov
