= Where on Earth =

Where on Earth may also refer to:

- Where on Earth??, a South Korea variety show program
- Whereonearth, a company based in the United Kingdom and acquired by Yahoo!
- Where on Earth, a 2012 collection of science fiction stories of Ursula Le Guin

== See also ==
- Where on Earth Is Carmen Sandiego?, an American animated television series
- WOEID ((Where On Earth IDentifier)
