= Yeh Yen-po =

Yeh Yen-po (Chinese: 葉彥伯; born 1963) is a Taiwanese physician and public official from Tianzhong Township, Changhua County, Taiwan. He currently serves as Director of the Changhua County Public Health Bureau (since August 2004) and Chairperson of the Taiwan Screening Society.

He has been referred to by the media as a “food safety hero” for his role in handling multiple food safety incidents in Changhua County. In 2020, however, he became the subject of controversy after initiating COVID-19 screening for asymptomatic individuals under home quarantine, a move that the Central Epidemic Command Center (CECC) ruled to be in violation of standard operating procedures.

== Career ==
Yeh graduated from Taipei Municipal Jianguo High School in 1981, and later received his Doctor of Medicine degree from National Yang Ming University in 1988. In 1990, he entered Provincial Taipei Hospital as a resident physician in family medicine, during which time he became aware of the importance of community-oriented primary care (COPC).

In 1992, Yeh was appointed Director and Physician of the Fangyuan Township Health Center in Changhua County. In 1996, he was recruited by then-director Hsu Hsiu-fu and appointed Section Chief of the First Section of the Changhua County Public Health Bureau. At the time, the First Section was responsible for infectious disease prevention, health education, and medical care for middle-aged and elderly populations. While serving in this role, Yeh pursued graduate studies at the Institute of Epidemiology, National Taiwan University, under the supervision of Chen Hsiu-hsi, Vice Dean of the College of Public Health, NTU, who served as his advisor for both his master's and doctoral theses.

In 1998, Yeh participated in investigations related to an enterovirus outbreak.

Following the 1999 Jiji earthquake (921 Earthquake), Yeh transferred to the Taichung County Public Health Bureau as deputy director, where he participated in post-disaster reconstruction efforts. His expanded responsibilities allowed him to gain experience in food sanitation inspection, pharmaceutical administration, and medical affairs management.

In August 2004, Yeh assumed office as Director of the Changhua County Public Health Bureau. Serving under county magistrates from different political parties, he has become the longest-serving first-level bureau director in Changhua County government history. During his tenure, he oversaw responses to major incidents such as the plasticizer food scandal and the tainted cooking oil scandal, leading some media outlets to refer to him as a “food safety hero.”

Beginning in April 2020, the Changhua County Public Health Bureau sought consent from asymptomatic but high-risk individuals under home quarantine to undergo screening at hospitals, under appropriate protective measures and continuous monitoring by the bureau. Yeh stated that all screenings were conducted in accordance with relevant procedures and laws. Changhua County Magistrate Wang Huei-mei publicly supported the initiative, stating that she was willing to be investigated herself and would take responsibility if any issues arose.

== Controversies ==
=== Changhua County COVID-19 screening controversy ===
In 2020, during the COVID-19 pandemic, the Changhua County government proactively sought consent from asymptomatic individuals under home quarantine to undergo hospital screening under public health bureau supervision. This action was questioned by CECC Commander Chen Shih-chung, who stated that Changhua County had conducted unauthorized screening without proper reporting, potentially violating standard operating procedures and involving improper use of National Health Insurance resources for cases that should have been self-funded.

=== Criticism over chairmanship of the Taiwan Screening Society ===
In addition to serving as Director of the Changhua County Public Health Bureau, Yeh also serves as Chairperson of the Taiwan Screening Society. The society's board members are largely composed of former students of Chen Hsiu-hsi, Yeh's academic advisor during his time at NTU's School of Public Health. The society's registered address is located at the Changhua County Public Health Bureau, which led to criticism from Democratic Progressive Party legislator Lin Chuyin, who questioned whether Changhua's screening efforts were conducted “for public health or for other purposes.”

In response, Yeh stated that the society is an academic organization focused on cancer screening research, education outreach, and international collaboration, and that it is unrelated to COVID-19 prevention.Changhua County Magistrate Wang Huei-mei also defended Yeh, citing a Yahoo Kimo poll showing approximately 80% public support for the Changhua screening initiative. She argued that the criticism amounted to misrepresentation and character defamation.

=== Screening society address controversy ===
Yeh's concurrent role as Chairperson of the Taiwan Screening Society, whose registered address is located at the Changhua County Public Health Bureau, also drew public scrutiny. Media outlets investigating the address found that it matched that of the public health bureau, yet no signage for the Taiwan Screening Society was present at the location.
