= Yahoo Hong Kong =

Website

Yahoo! Hong Kong
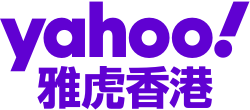
- Available in: Traditional Chinese
- Owner: Yahoo! Inc.
- Creator: Yahoo
- Website: hk.yahoo.com
- Commercial: Yes
- Registration: Optional
- Current status: Online

Yahoo! Hong Kong (Chinese: 雅虎香港) is the Hong Kong branch of Yahoo! that was established in 1999. In its early days, Yahoo had a large market share in Hong Kong, and its primary competitors were Google, MSN, and Sina. Yahoo! Hong Kong has many services, such as Yahoo! Online Battle Games, Auctions, Weather, etc., though many services were closed after reorganisation. The current focus is on news and informational content, in part by re-uploading articles from various websites, as well as inviting many celebrities to work as columnists. As of October 2021, Yahoo! Hong Kong ranks 6th on Alexa traffic statistics in Hong Kong.

== Yahoo! Asia Buzz Awards ==
Since 2005, Yahoo! Hong Kong has held the annual Yahoo! Asia Buzz Awards, which award celebrities in the entertainment industry based on the frequency of searches by Yahoo! netizens. It is the first awards ceremony of its kind held by a Hong Kong website.

== Yahoo TV ==
In April 2017, the livestreaming platform Yahoo TV was launched, including the show Fast Food Television (速食電視), which aims to provide viewers with homemade programs that are 'only a few minutes but clear at a glance' (幾分鐘一集，一眼睇晒).

== Logos ==
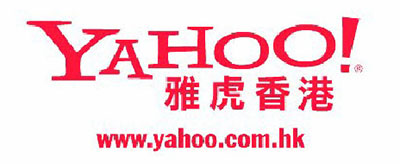
First generation logo of Yahoo! Hong Kong (1999–2009)

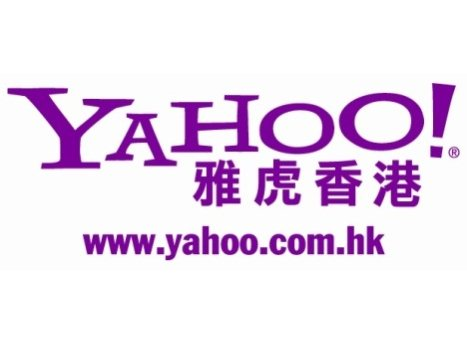
Second generation logo of Yahoo! Hong Kong (2009–2013)

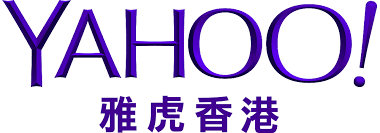
Third generation logo of Yahoo! Hong Kong (2013–2019)

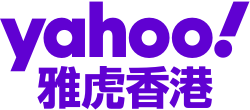
Fourth generation logo of Yahoo! Hong Kong (since 2019)
