= Guru Gowrappan =

Former President of Viasat Inc.

K. Guru Gowrappan
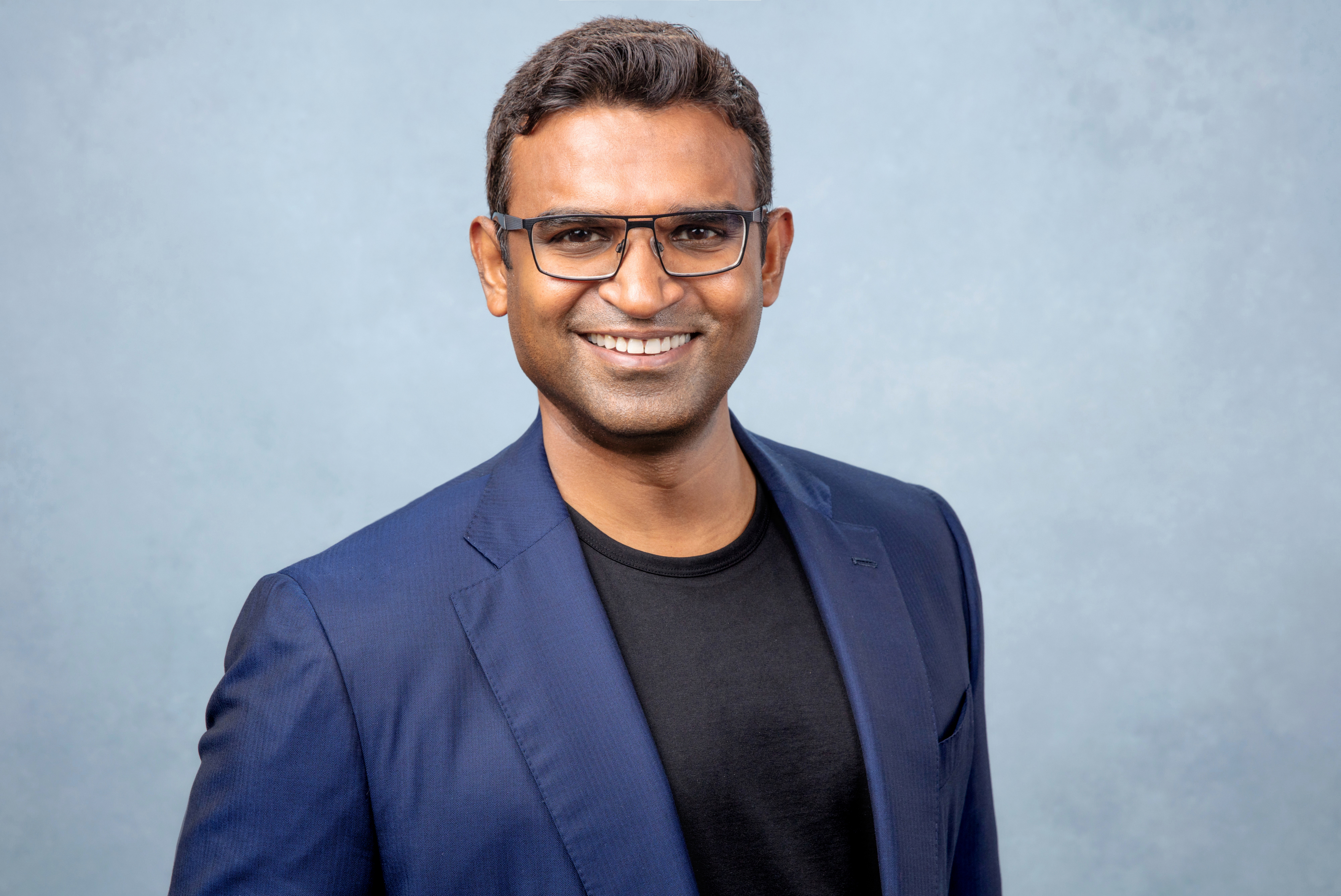
- Born: Kumara Guru Gowrappan; 1980 or 1981 (age 45–46); India
- Education: Madras University; University of Southern California
- Occupation: Former President of Viasat Inc.
- Known for: Former CEO of Yahoo

K. Guru Gowrappan was the president of Viasat Inc. He is the former CEO of Yahoo and previously held leadership positions with Apollo Global Management, Alibaba Group, Zynga, Overture, and Quixey.

== Early life and education ==
K. Guru Gowrappan was born in India. He earned a degree in information technology from Madras University and his master's degree in computer science from the University of Southern California. He completed the business bridge program at Tuck School of Business, the graduate business school of Dartmouth College.

== Career ==
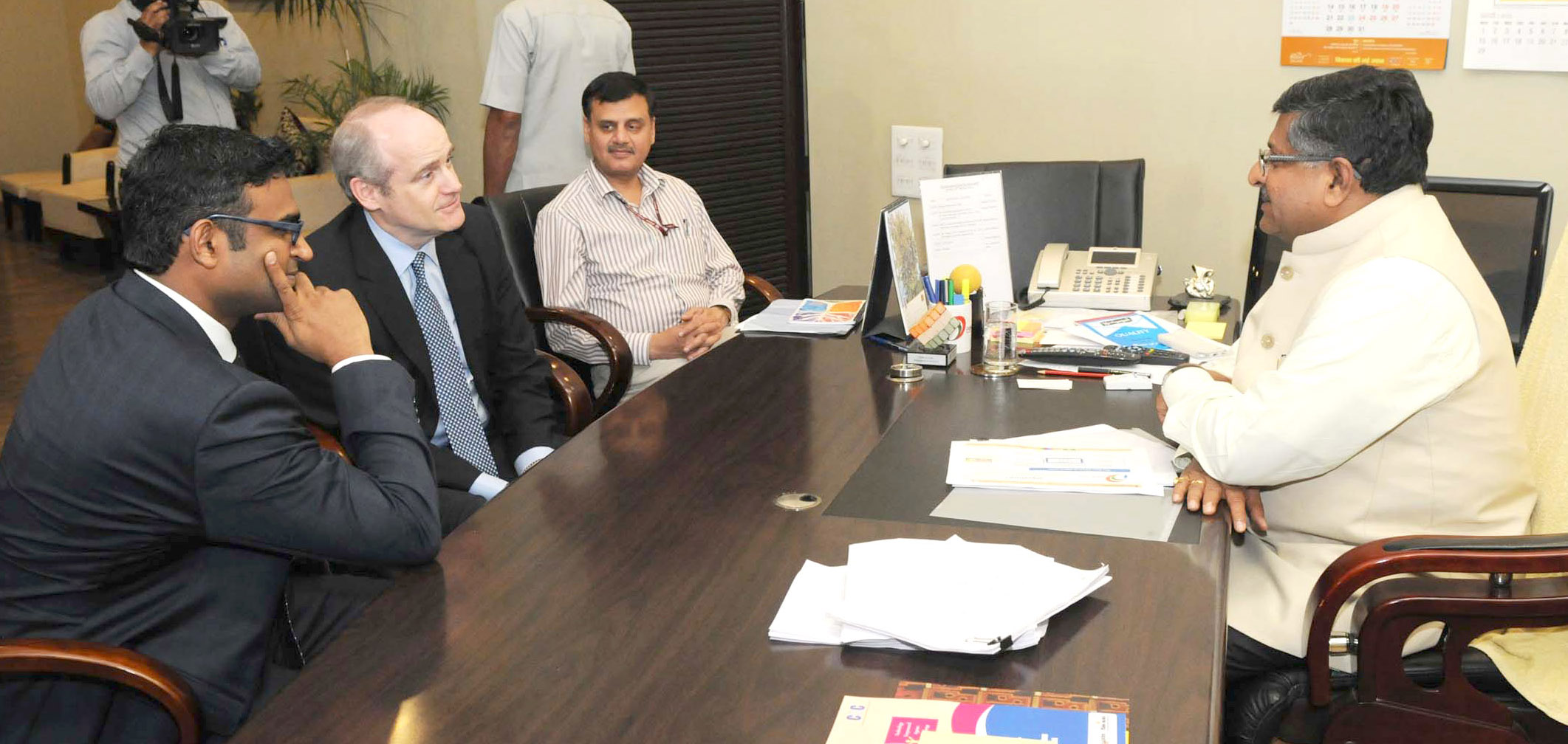
Guru Gowrappan (left) and other Alibaba Group officials meet with Union Minister for Communications & Information Technology Shri Ravi Shankar Prasad in New Delhi in 2016.

Gowrappan served as global managing director of Alibaba Group (2015–2018), in charge of international expansion for consumer and enterprise products.

He was chief operations officer of Zynga, where he led growth and emerging initiatives, mergers and acquisitions integration, including the purchase of Newtoy, which brought Words With Friends to Zynga, and worked with top executives during Zynga's 2011 initial public offering. Gowrappan also had leadership and executive roles in strategy and business operations at Overture, Yahoo!, and led product growth at Quixey (as COO).

Verizon hired Gowrappan in April 2018 as president and COO of its Oath division (later renamed Verizon Media; as of September 1, 2021, a standalone company named Yahoo). His duties included consumer, revenue operations, and business-to-business marketing. He assumed the role of CEO of Verizon Media in October 2018, succeeding Tim Armstrong, the former AOL CEO who oversaw Verizon's consolidation of AOL and Yahoo.

As part of his plan as CEO of Verizon Media, whose brands include Yahoo and AOL, Gowrappan said the unit would focus on mobile and video products, and revenue from its advertising platforms. Gowrappan's efforts include initiatives to introduce online shopping and transactions into Verizon Media's digital offerings. Gowrappan sought to differentiate Verizon Media from other businesses by focusing on premium content by publishers and premium memberships. Additionally, Gowrappan stopped efforts to sell brands within Verizon Media and shuttered flagging services. In early 2019, Verizon announced it would lay off 7% of the media group staff following a monthslong review of the business by Gowrappan. Variety attributed Gowrappan with the introduction of Verizon Media Immersive, an advertising and content extended reality platform, and a deal with the NBA and Yahoo Sports with live VR experiences by RYOT. Gowrappan leads Mind Together, a group addressing workplace culture around mental health.

In May 2021, Apollo Global Management agreed to acquire 90% of Verizon Media from Verizon for $5 billion. The sale closed on September 1, 2021, with Gowrappan named the CEO of Yahoo. Gowrappan led the new company in the weeks following the merger until September 27, 2021, when he was succeeded by Jim Lanzone. Gowrappan was named senior advisor to Apollo Global Management.

As of 2021, Gowrappan serves on the board of directors of BNY Mellon and Tech:NYC. He has served on the board of directors for One97 Communications Ltd, the parent of Paytm, and is an angel investor and advisor to Indian start-ups.
