= YPN =

YPN or ypn can refer to:

- Port-Menier Airport, an airport near Port-Menier, Québec, Canada, by IATA code
- Yahoo! Publisher Network, a now-defunct advertising network from 2005 to 2010
- Phowa language, spoken in China, by ISO 639 code
