= PlayerScale =

Gaming infrustructure provider

- Type: Subsidiary
- Industry: e-commerce, internet advertising, social gaming
- Founded: 2009; 17 years ago
- Founder: Chris Benjaminsen
- Headquarters: Belmont, California
- Key people: Jesper Jensen (CEO); John Vifian (COO); Chris Benjaminsen (CPO); Oliver Pedersen (CTO)
- Products: Player.IO
- Number of employees: 14 (January 2013)
- Parent: Yahoo!
- Website: gamesnet.yahoo.com

PlayerScale, Inc. is a Belmont-based gaming infrastructure provider. As of 23 May 2013 it operates as a subsidiary of Yahoo!, but it is still functioning as a stand-alone business unit. As of 9 April 2016, Games Platform Company ApS acquired Yahoo Games Backend Services.

== Player.IO ==
PlayerScale's Player.IO is a platform for online games. It works across consoles, the web, PCs, Macs, and on mobile phones. Player.IO is used on a daily basis by an estimated 150 million people worldwide. It works with various programming languages, including C++, Java, .NET, Objective-C, HTML5, Unity, Flash, iOS and Android. The platform includes payment processing, online chat, analytics, virtual currencies, distributed caching, authentication, social login, leaderboards, localization, among other things.

=== Everybody Edits ===
One of the Player.IO showcase projects was the maze-based platform game Everybody Edits. During his lecture at the 2011 Flash Gaming Summit, PlayerScale chief product officer and Player.IO co-founder Benjaminsen revealed that the game, initially published on Flash game portal Newgrounds, had accumulated around 250 thousand registered users in seven months and was making $10,000 monthly.

In a 2011 review for Jay Is Games, John Bardinelli writes: "Experiments in user-created content can go wildly wrong. With Everybody Edits, it happened to go wildly right. [...] The game as a whole doesn't project an air of refined polish, but the core underneath exhibits a lot of creativity and allows players to unleash their imaginations wild on the world in a simple, entertaining sort of way." Phill Cameron of Rock Paper Shotgun: "I keep coming back to Everybody Edits. I think it's because I'm never alone. Just having other people share in your victories, and more importantly, to lessen your defeats, makes for a compelling experience. You're in this together, for better or for worse, and that forces a level of camaraderie. [...] Regardless, you've got one thing in common; you hate whoever created this meticulously designed Rage Machine."

In March 2019, the game suffered a data breach, exposing 871 thousand unique email addresses, alongside usernames and IP addresses. In July 2019, another data breach occurred, leaking 882 unique email addresses, usernames and passwords in plaintext, along with in-game report files. Everybody Edits was eventually shut down on 31 December 2020, the last day Adobe supported its Flash Player.

== See also ==
- DeNA
- GREE
- List of mergers and acquisitions by Yahoo!
- Yahoo! Games
