= SearchFox =

Former search engine company

- Type: Privately held company
- Industry: software
- Founder: James Gibbons
- Headquarters: Sunnyvale, California
- Services: web search engine
- Parent: Yahoo!

SearchFox was a web search engine company based in the United States. It was acquired by Yahoo! on January 17, 2006, and merged into the Yahoo! Search service.

== Service ==
SearchFox offered personalized RSS feeds which were customized according to user preferences. The service analyzed feeds that a user read, and then recommended other feeds that may interest the reader. The website also had a collaborate search engine, which visitors could use to share favorite links among friends and create personalized search indices for their own convenience.

The privately held company, co-founded by James Gibbons, a Stanford University professor and former dean of the university's School of Engineering, launched in September 2005, initially with a private beta and a small number of users. Upon launching, Michael Arrington of TechCrunch commented, "It's the first product I've seen that does a good job of prioritizing new content from feeds based on your historical reading behavior, as well as data gathered from the SearchFox community as a whole. I've only been using it for a couple of days, but I am already seeing how the prioritization works and I'm fairly happy with the decisions it is making."

== Yahoo! acquisition ==
The company announced in January 2006 that they would shut down the company on January 25, 2006, because it was not profitable. Yahoo! offered to purchase the company on January 17, 2006, which SearchFox accepted. The company's assets and employees were all acquired by Yahoo!, and SearchFox moved to Sunnyvale, California, where Yahoo!'s headquarters are located.
