= Yahoo Kimo =

Taiwan branch of Yahoo!

Yahoo! Kimo
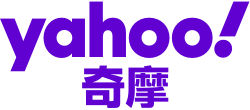
- Available in: Traditional Chinese
- Area served: Taiwan
- Owner: Apollo Global Management
- Parent: Yahoo
- Website: tw.yahoo.com
- Commercial: Yes
- Registration: Optional
- Launched: October 2001
- Current status: Active

Yahoo! Kimo (Chinese: Yahoo!奇摩) is the Taiwanese version of Yahoo!, a web services provider based in the United States. In February 2001, Yahoo! Inc. acquired Kimo, a Taiwanese search engine, and in October 2001, Yahoo! Kimo was launched as the merger of Kimo with Yahoo! Taiwan.

== Services ==
Information
News
Sports
Stock
Fund
Weather
Real estate
Autos
Charity
Health
Dictionary
Search
3C Technology

Communication
Mail
Social games

Entertainment
Celebrity entertainment
Movies
Fashion and Beauty
Music
Games
Travel
Astrology
Yahoo TV

Shopping
Auction
ATM
Billing
Campaign
Services+
Group buy
Keyword advertising
Shopping center
Store opening
Discounts+
Find a store+

=== Discontinued services ===
- Personal homepage
- Club
- Blog
- Wretch
- Flickr
- Instant messenger
- Answers
- Shopping

== See also ==
- Yahoo!
