= Microsoft Advertising =

Online advertising service

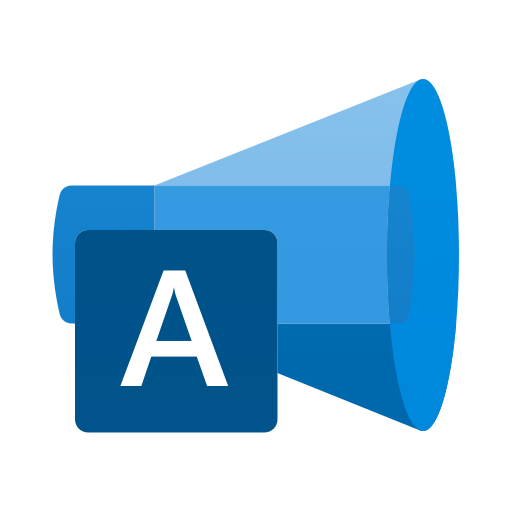
- Original author: Microsoft
- Developer: Microsoft AI
- Type: Online advertising
- Website: ads.microsoft.com

Microsoft Advertising, also known as Microsoft Ads (formerly Bing Ads) is an online advertising platform developed by Microsoft, where advertisers bid to display brief advertisements to web users. It provides pay per click advertising on search engines Bing, Yahoo! and DuckDuckGo, as well as on other websites, mobile apps, and videos.

Advertisers can import their Google Ads campaigns directly into the Microsoft Advertising platform. This time saving feature encourages advertisers to use their platform even though it has significantly less users.

== History ==
Microsoft was the last of the "big three" search engines (which also includes Google and Yahoo!) to develop its own system for delivering pay-per-click (PPC) ads. Until the beginning of 2006, all of the ads displayed on the MSN Search engine were supplied by Overture (and later Yahoo!). MSN collected a portion of the ad revenue in return for displaying Yahoo!'s ads on its search engine.

As search marketing grew, Microsoft began developing its own system, MSN adCenter, for selling PPC advertisements directly to advertisers. As the system was phased in, MSN Search (now Bing) showed Yahoo! and adCenter advertising in its search results. Microsoft effort to create AdCenter was led by Tarek Najm, then general manager of the MSN division of Microsoft. In June 2006, the contract between Yahoo! and Microsoft expired and Microsoft was displaying only ads from adCenter until 2010.

In November 2006 Microsoft acquired Deep Metrix, a company situated in Gatineau, Canada, that created web-analytics software. Microsoft has built a new product adCenter Analytics based on the acquired technology. In October, 2007 the beta version of Microsoft Project Gatineau was released to a limited number of participants.

In May 2007, Microsoft agreed to purchase the digital marketing solutions parent company, aQuantive, for roughly $6 billion. Microsoft later resold Atlas, a key piece of the aQuantive acquisition, to Facebook in 2013.

Microsoft acquired ScreenTonic on May 3, 2007, AdECN on July 26, 2007, and YaData on February 27, 2008, and merged their technologies into adCenter.

On February 23, 2009, the Publisher Leadership Council was created under the umbrella of Microsoft Advertising. The council was responsible for delivering the next-generation advertising platform for the publishers of digital media resulting in the formation of Microsoft pubCenter.

In January 2010, Microsoft announced a deal in which it would take over the functional operation of Yahoo! Search, and set up a joint venture to sell advertising on both Yahoo! Search and Bing known as the Microsoft Search Alliance. A complete transition of all Yahoo! sponsored ad clients to Microsoft adCenter occurred in October 2010.

On September 10, 2012, adCenter was renamed to Bing Ads, and the Search Alliance was renamed the Yahoo! Bing Network.

In April 2015, the Yahoo! partnership was modified; Yahoo! Search will only have to feature Bing results on the "majority" of desktop traffic, leaving the company open to "enhance the search experience" non-exclusively on both desktop and mobile. Additionally, Microsoft will take over as the exclusive seller of ads delivered through Bing. Yahoo! will sell its own ads through its new in-house Gemini platform.

On June 29, 2015, AOL Inc. announced a deal and partnership to take over the majority of Microsoft's ad sales business. Under the pact, AOL will take over the sale of display, video, and mobile ads on various Microsoft platforms in nine countries, including Brazil, Canada, the United States, and the United Kingdom. As many as 1200 Microsoft employees involved with the business will be transferred to AOL. In turn, AOL's properties will replace Google Search with Bing, and display Bing Ads sold by Microsoft.

In May 2018, Bing Ads released additional productivity and time-saving tools for users managing their campaigns via Bing Ads Editor.

On April 30, 2019, Bing Ads was re-branded to Microsoft Advertising.

On August 5, 2019, Microsoft acquired PromoteIQ, a leading provider of vendor marketing technology to online retailers and brands.

In 2021, Microsoft Advertising surpassed US$10 billion in annual revenue.

On December 21, 2021, Microsoft announced its plans to acquire Xandr from AT&T. Six months later, Microsoft disclosed that the acquisition had been completed.

In May 2025, Microsoft confirmed that it would sunset its Invest DSP (formerly known as Xandr). As reported by Digiday, the decision to end its DSP operations was driven by the company's AI priorities: "Our commitment to more private and personalized advertising experiences for a conversational and agentic world is not achievable with the industry’s current DSP model and, therefore, it no longer aligns with our investment in this future."

== Technology ==
Similar to Google Ads, Microsoft Advertising uses both the maximum amount an advertiser is willing to pay-per-click (PPC) on their ad and the advertisement's click-through rate (CTR) to determine how frequently an advertisement is shown. This system encourages advertisers to write effective ads and to advertise only on searches which are relevant to their advertisement.

In 2021, Microsoft Advertising began rolling out LinkedIn audience observation and bid management targeting, allowing advertisers to monitor and bid against common LinkedIn Ads audiences, including company size, industry, job function, as well as lists of individual companies.

Similar to Google Ads Editor, Microsoft Advertising provides a desktop tool to manage campaigns offline, called Microsoft Ads Editor. Using this editor you can make offline changes to your campaigns and later sync it online.

Microsoft Advertising also provides APIs that can be used to manage advertising campaigns.

== See also ==
- Microsoft adCenter Analytics
