= Jess Lee (businesswoman) =

American venture capitalist

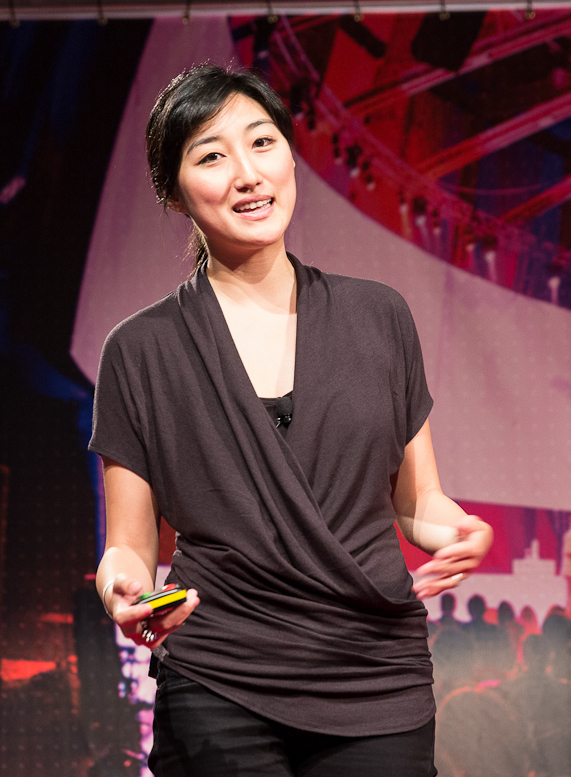
Lee in 2013

Jess Lee (born 1982) is an American venture capitalist. She is a former partner at Sequoia Capital and the former chief executive officer of Polyvore, which she joined as co-founder and first employee.

== Early life ==
Lee lived in Hong Kong until the age of 17, when she graduated from Hong Kong International School, then moved to California to pursue a bachelor's degree in computer science at Stanford University, though she had initially been interested in attending art school.

== Career ==
In 2004, Lee was recruited into Google's associate product manager (APM) program, which had been founded and was then still led by Marissa Mayer. Lee started work on Google's shopping engine Froogle before becoming product manager of Google Maps. There she worked with a team of five engineers to create My Maps, a project that allowed users to create maps of their own.

She joined Polyvore as a product manager in 2008 after providing co-founder Pasha Sadri with feedback on issues with the website. Lee initially wrote code for Polyvore but later started to handle social media, hiring, and finding new locations for the office. Her role expanded to honorary co-founder in 2010 and she was promoted to CEO in 2012. Lee then guided the company to cut down on features such as the "Ask" section and opened another office in New York City.

In 2016, she joined Sequoia Capital as an investing partner, becoming its first female partner in the U.S. Hired at age 33, Lee became one of Sequoia's youngest partners. In November 2026, Newcomer reported that Lee and two other U.S.-based partners on Sequoia’s early-stage team had been "pushed out" of the firm.

== Personal life ==
She currently resides in Mountain View, California.
