= Singshot =

SingShot Media was founded by Ranah Edelin (CEO) and Niranjan Nagar (CTO) in January 2006 (they both were executives at Listen.com, the company behind the music service Rhapsody) and was a legal karaoke website designed to allow its users to choose from a vast selection of music then record their own versions that could be shared with anyone on the Web. Members used a microphone or webcam connected to a computer to record themselves along with the site's Flash-based karaoke player.

The site allowed users to create singing contests, although usually not for monetary prizes, just for "bragging rights". However, on some occasions contests were sponsored. Members were allowed to rate other member's performances on a five star scale and could leave "feedback" on the performances.

The site was launched on July 31, 2006 and was chosen in August 2006 as one of Time Magazine's Coolest Websites in 2006.

On February 12, 2007, Electronic Arts acquired SingShot Media. The site became a part of The Sims Label within EA.

On September 5, 2007 Singshot.com changed to The Sims On Stage. It was similar to the original SingShot but users could contribute other content in addition to karaoke such as movie mashups, poetry, comedy, and stories on the site.

One competitor to SingShot is Bix, a Yahoo Company.

On March 31, 2009, EA made the decision to close down The Sims on Stage. The following letter was provided to customers:

We need to tell you about an important change to a service in which you participate. Electronic Arts has made the decision to close The Sims On Stage service in order to focus resources on future games.

After March 31, 2009, The Sims On Stage will no longer be in service. You may continue use the site until the closure date. After March 31, 2009, all content related to the Karaoke, Mashups, Comedy, Stories, and Poetry categories will be deleted.

We apologize for any inconvenience this may cause and thank you for making The Sims on Stage a fun experience for all.

If you have further questions about your account, please visit our support site at support.ea.com.

Thank you,
Electronic Arts
