= Yahoo Publisher Network =

The Yahoo! Publisher Network (abbreviated YPN) was an advertising network launched on August 2, 2005, by Yahoo! and effectively closed on April 30, 2010. The service only accepted US-Based publishers. YPN provided cost per click contextual advertising as well as various tools and services to assist publishers in building and improving their websites.

== History ==
In May 2006, YPN caused some controversy by shutting down accounts used for MySpace layout sites. The reason given was the quality of traffic was very poor.

Also in May 2006, the Yahoo! Publisher Network's blog posted an updated version of their requirements from publishers. YPN explicitly stated visitors must recognize advertisements as advertisements, and images/media could not be placed to induce accidental clicks.

== Closure ==
Users of the service received an e-mail on March 31, 2010, that the service would stop serving ads on April 30, 2010. Users who wished to continue displaying advertisements were referred to the Chitika ad network. Chitika is a search-targeted advertising network and serves over 2 billion ads per month.

== See also ==
- Microsoft pubCenter
