= Quixey =

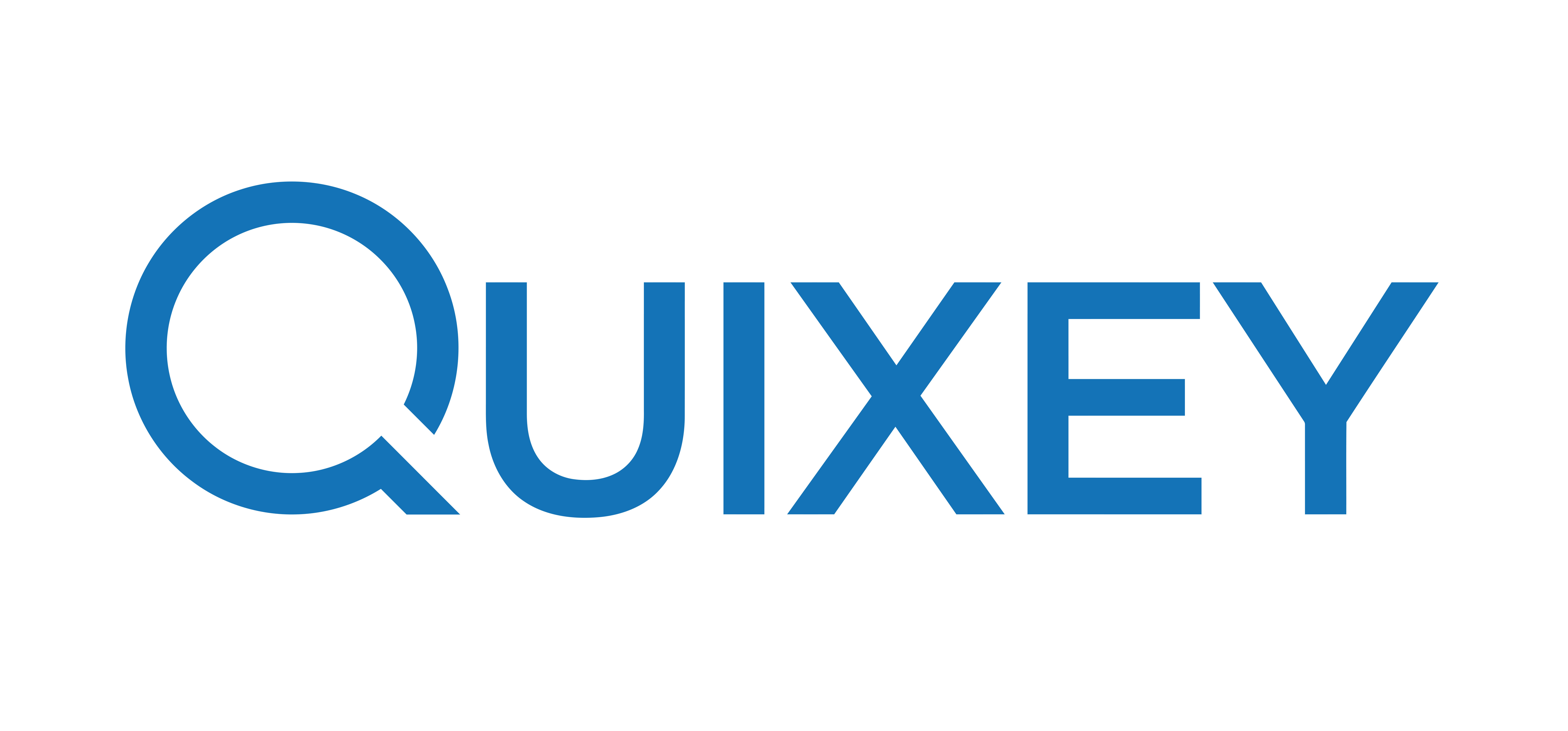
- Type: Private
- Founded: Mountain View, California, United States (2009)
- Defunct: February 2017
- Headquarters: 303 Bryant Street; Mountain View, California, CA
- Key people: Mark Lazar, CEO; Tomer Kagan, Co-founder, Chief Strategy Officer; Liron Shapira, Co-founder, Chief Science Officer
- Products: Natural language search engine technology for finding mobile applications

Quixey was a company located in Mountain View, California. Quixey search, which it called "functional", allowed apps to be searched for by the actions the app can perform instead of requiring the user to know the name of the app. In 2015, Quixey raised a $60 million investment round at a valuation of approximately $600 million. Quixey shut down in February 2017.

== History ==
Quixey was co-founded in 2009 by Chief Strategy Officer (and former CEO) Tomer Kagan and Chief Science Officer Liron Shapira. The company spent a year and a half building the product.

On December 4, 2012, Quixey partnered with the federated search engine, Ask.com. A month later, the company claimed that it was powering nearly 100 million queries per month. On June 27, 2013, the company announced sponsored results, its first attempt at monetization.

In February 2016, several executives reportedly left Quixey as the company missed revenue targets. The company shut down in February 2017.

=== Funding ===
At the same time as its private launch, Quixey announced its $400,000 seed round funding, led by Eric Schmidt’s Innovation Endeavors. In August 2011, the company closed its Series A round of funding, led by U.S. Venture Partners and WI Harper Group, with participation from Webb Investment Network and Innovation Endeavors. Between August 2011 and June 2012, when Quixey announced its Series B round of $20 million, the company grew from six employees to 30.

== Partners ==
Quixey’s partners included Ask.com, a federated search engine that in 2012 was reported to get 3% of all U.S.-based query volume. The company began powering Ask.com’s app search on December 4, 2012. Quixey powered app search for Sprint on two products: Sprint Digital Lounge and Sprint Zone.

== Quixey Challenge ==
Early on, Quixey built a coding challenge called Quixey Challenge to attract engineering talent. The contest asked participants to solve a bug in under one minute to win $100 and a Quixey t-shirt. In December 2011, the contest yielded 38 winners, five of which became serious candidates for three open positions.
