= BuzzTracker =

BuzzTracker is a news aggregator and blog tracking website that was acquired by Yahoo! on September 14, 2007 and merged into Yahoo! News. The website is owned by Participate Media, which was founded and based in Chicago, Illinois before moving to Sunnyvale, California after being acquired by Yahoo!. The website has been in beta since its inception, and it tracks about 110,000 content sources, which includes traditional media and blogs, and takes "the pulse of what’s happening in various topic areas on the Net". After indexing new content, the website generates news pages for thousands of different topics, and it integrates information from Flickr and YouTube to provide related pictures and videos. In addition to the BuzzTracker website, the BuzzTracker software is used as a white-label software on other websites including TVWeek.com.

When Yahoo! acquired the company, BuzzTracker's founder Alan Warms joined Yahoo! as the general manager and vice president of Yahoo! News. Yahoo! commented on BuzzTracker after the acquisition, saying, "Alan and the folks at BuzzTracker have come up with a way to spotlight the hottest information and give users a tool that makes the information easily digestible." No price was disclosed for the acquisition, but it is believed to be in the single-digit millions, around US$5 million. After the acquisition, Forbes commented on Yahoo!'s rivalry with competing companies Google and Digg, saying, "This will also move [Yahoo!] into Google News and Digg territory, while Google is trying to move into the human-editorial side with the AP/AFP/PA deal announced last month." Several months after Yahoo! acquired BuzzTracker, the website has still yet to be integrated into Yahoo! News.
