= Polyvore =

Defunct American social commerce website

- Available in: English
- Owner: SSENSE
- Founders: Pasha Sadri, Jianing Hu, Guangwei Yuen, and Jess Lee (businesswoman)
- Parent: Yahoo! Inc. (2015–2017); Oath Inc. (2017–2018); SSENSE (acquired April 2018)
- Website: polyvore.com
- Users: 20 million
- Launched: February 1, 2007
- Current status: Permanently shut down

Polyvore was a community-powered social commerce website headquartered in Mountain View, California. The company's virtual mood board function allowed community members to add products into a shared product index, and use them to create image collages called "Sets". They could browse other users' sets for inspiration, share sets with friends and interact with people through comments and likes. Due to the visual nature of the tool Polyvore was mostly used to build sets in the fields of home decoration, beauty and fashion. Online retailers, too, could upload their product images to Polyvore and link back to their product pages or use Polyvore to encourage users to showcase their products through such activities as board creation competitions.

Polyvore opened an office in New York City in August 2012. At that point the company said it had been amassing 17 million active users. By the end of 2012 the company said its site had received 20 million unique visitors per month, a number which continued to be used in 2016. The site was bought by SSENSE and, on April 5, 2018 it was shut down.

Polyvore was initially funded in three rounds by six investors, including initial investors Benchmark Capital and Harrison Metal, and Matrix Partners and DAG Ventures as lead investors in later rounds. It was acquired by Yahoo on July 31, 2015.

On April 5, 2018, Polyvore announced that it had been acquired by SSENSE and would cease operations immediately. Users wishing to save their account data were directed to a request form on the Polyvore blog.

== History ==
Polyvore started as a prototype developed by Pasha Sadri in August 2006. While he and his wife were decorating their new house, they found themselves cutting furniture ideas and color patches out of magazines and assembling them into inspiration boards. While this tried and tested approach worked, Sadri, an engineer at Yahoo, felt that it would be better if the mood boards could be created online. He used Yahoo Pipes, one of the tools he had made, as a basis to build the first iteration of Polyvore. Soon after its creation, fellow Yahoo engineers Jianing Hu and Guangwei Yuen had joined Sadri to form the founding team, which launched the first version of the website in 2007.

In August 2009, Polyvore had reached 4 million unique visitors, 150 million pageviews a month, and received exactly US$5.6 million in series B funding led by Matrix Partners, alongside previous investors Benchmark Capital and Harrison Metal Capital.

The New Yorker profiled Polyvore in March 2010, calling it a “fashion democracy” and a “world of virtual Anna Wintours”. At the time, Polyvore received 6.6 million unique visitors. An increase in inquiries from e-commerce companies led Polyvore to experiment with ways to monetise their users through such things as affiliate marketing and sponsored board creating competitions.

Polyvore reached profitability in 2011, largely through the use of affiliate links. As each item in a Polyvore set already links back to the page where it was clipped, entering into affiliate partnerships that generate revenue for the company when users click on those links was not a big step. And unlike many other affiliate sites that had to manually update links when retailers changed their site structure, Polyvore invested in software bots that rewrote links that changed and ensured that its links always pointed to the most up-to-date product page. The company's product-centric, tech-led approach, coupled with its highly engaged user base, seemed to be the key to success leading Colleen Taylor of GigaOm to state: "Polyvore’s product-first strategy seems to be paying off: an eighth of Polyvore’s audience comes back to the site more than 100 times per month." For that same year, Polyvore was named in Entrepreneur Magazine's 100 Most Brilliant Companies list, and as number 29 of Time Magazine's 50 Best Websites.

Polyvore received US$14 million in Series C funding from DAG Ventures, Goldman Sachs, Matrix, and Vivi Nevo in January 2012.

Shortly afterward, in February 2012, Polyvore partnered with CoverGirl to launch "Polyvore Live", a live-streamed fashion show during Mercedes Benz Fashion Week, that showcased the collections of four alumni from the Fashion Institute of Technology, Lauren Bagliore, Vengsarkar “Ven” Budhu, Sergio Guadarrama, and Dana-Maxx Pomerantz. The project also involved collaborations with a number of fashion and beauty bloggers, including Aimee Song of Song of Style, Nadia Sarwar of Frou Frouu, Christian Caradona of Trop Rouge, and Julie Sarinana of Sincerely Jules. That same year, Polyvore was named by Fast Company as number 28 of its 50 Most Innovative Companies of the year.

In August 2012, Polyvore opened its first New York office, in SoHo, with Mayor Michael Bloomberg issuing a personal welcome: "By opening an office here, Polyvore is joining the growing group of tech companies who recognize that the benefits of being in New York City are irresistible, regardless of where a startup began." In November 2012, the company launched its inaugural iOS app, and Polyvore's website achieved a 19 million monthly unique visitor count.

By May 2014, over three million members had downloaded the Polyvore iPhone app and the company was reporting 20 million unique visitors per month; in that month, the company launched its first Android app. A year later, in April 2015, Polyvore launched its second iPhone app called Remix. Unlike the main Polyvore app, which is aimed at 'creators', users looking to assemble their own style boards, Remix helps those who want to be inspired by others' creations by using the company's wide pool of data points to allow users to discover popular items or sets, match their favorites with undiscovered pieces into complete outfits and bookmark these into favorites.

On July 31, 2015, Yahoo and Polyvore announced that Yahoo would acquire Polyvore for an undisclosed amount to augment its e-commerce operations. According to Eric Jackson, manager of hedge fund SpringOwl, Yahoo purchased Polyvore for 230 million U.S dollars. On September 13, 2017, Verizon acquired Yahoo and its subsidiaries for an estimated 4.48 billion U.S. dollars. This merged Polyvore in to a media group known as Oath.

On April 5, 2018, the Polyvore staff released a blogpost informing users that the site had been purchased by luxury e-retailer Ssense. From then on, the website directed to the Ssense home page and all apps became defunct. After outcry from former Polyvore users, Ssense posted to Twitter on April 10, 2018 stating that they were unable to restore the site. Thus, Polyvore was permanently shut down.

Following the acquisition, former Polyvore users complained that links provided to download their data, opt out of Ssense communications, or delete their data from Ssense were broken. This sparked outrage over user privacy and security. Over Instagram, the e-retailer assured customers that they would only receive their username, email, and email preferences- not any user data. Additionally, they stated that anyone with data connected to Polyvore may request their data be deleted by May 15, 2018 and the links were fully functional. While online users maintained that they were unable to opt out of data transfer, Ssense would not publicly acknowledge the situation again.

== Leadership ==
Polyvore was envisioned as a product and service by Pasha Sadri in August 2006 while he and his wife were remodeling their house and were looking to create digital mood boards to help with their decorating choices. He was soon joined by Jianing Hu and Guangwei Yuan, two software engineers he had met while they all worked at Yahoo, and the trio launched of the first version of the website in 2007.

In its first year of creation, Jess Lee, a product manager at Google and an early Polyvore fan and user, emailed Sadri with a set of product suggestions, and, as Sadri explained in 2013: "The email was unlike any feedback we’d ever gotten ... It was a two-page-long analysis, detailing 'this is broken, we can fix it this way.'" In a July 2013 feature in Wired, Lee described herself as an "obsessive user" prior to her recruitment, and described her interest and motivation: “Influencers in fashion right now are a cliquey club in New York that’s very hard to get into,” making it hard for others to shape the trends. Lee joined the company within nine months of her first visit, and became its CEO. Lee played a role in attracting its eventual buyer, Yahoo, as she had business relations with the company's then CEO, Marissa Mayer, who had recruited her during her period at Google.

At the time of its acquisition, Lee was listed as Co-Founder and CEO, Pasha Sadri as Co-Founder and Director, Arnie Gullov-Singh as COO, and Guangwei Yuan and Jianing Hu as Co-Founders.

== Traffic ==
In August 2012 Polyvore was receiving 17 million unique monthly visitors, and as of July 2013, traffic of 20 million visitors per month. In May 2014, the company was reported to be receiving 20 million unique visitors per month. Between August 2009 and May 2014, the number of monthly unique visitors increased from 4 million to 20 million.

== Alternatives ==
Polyvore was acquired by SSENSE, a Montreal-based online retailer, and shut down in 2018. Founded in 2007, Polyvore gave users the tools to create collages of clothing, beauty, and home products, and in doing so, created a community of people getting creative and following each other's work. Now there are many alternatives to Polyvore, such as ShopLook, Fashmates, Combyne, Fashiers, URSTYLE.fashion, TrendMe, Bantoa and Stylevore.
