= Yahoo Kickstart =

Professional network Social media

Yahoo! Kickstart
- Website type: Social media
- Founded: November 5, 2007
- Owner: Yahoo!
- Current status: Defunct

Yahoo! Kickstart was a professional network created by Yahoo! for college students, recent graduates, employers and alumni. The service was similar to LinkedIn, initially aimed at connecting students and alumni of the same university professionally, with recruiters joining later in the network's inception. Yahoo! offered a $25,000 prize to whichever college or university that got the greatest number of alumni to sign up before December 31, 2007. Kickstart's "Preview" (beta) was launched on November 5, 2007 by Yahoo!'s Advanced Products team, based in San Francisco. Yahoo closed down the network in 2008, amidst reports of server downtime and error messages. Users were redirected to Yahoo! HotJobs as an alternative for jobseekers.

== Features ==
Yahoo! Kickstart was a LinkedIn-style network designed for students and recent graduates who were looking for jobs after college. The platform provided each user with a profile page that functioned like an informal résumé, where they could list their education, work experience, and skills.

When users joined, they entered the college they attended and were automatically placed into their university’s network, which connected them to classmates and alumni from the same school. Each university page functioned similarly to a Facebook network page, offering message boards, events, and alumni directories.

The main goal of the service was to connect students with alumni who were already working in industries or companies of interest, turning school ties into professional networks to help launch careers.
