= Yahoo Search BOSS =

Discontinued custom search tool

Yahoo Search BOSS (Build your Own Search Service) was a Yahoo! Developer Network initiative to provide an open search web services platform.

Yahoo discontinued BOSS JSON Search API, BOSS Placefinder API, BOSS Placespotter API and as well BOSS Hosted Search, on March 31, 2016. Yahoo BOSS is succeeded by Yahoo Partner Ads (YPA).

== History ==
Yahoo launched BOSS in July 2008. In 2012, Yahoo expanded their Yahoo Search BOSS platform to provide additional services such as BOSS Hosted Search to enable any website owner to embed Yahoo web search experience free on their site.

== BOSS API ==
The main goal and idea of BOSS was to give users, in its case developers, access to the Yahoo Search index for a small fee. The results could be supplied into the developer's website or program so that they could manipulate the resources according to their product's requirements. BOSS allowed the results to be returned in XML, JSON, HTML, or text and allowed use of comprehensive search features available in Yahoo, like pulling the results by page, searching inside PDFs, etc. The ranking of the websites for a search term was the same as the Yahoo Search ranking since both of these were pulling from the same index and ranking.

One of BOSS's key differentiators was the free use of BOSS as a white label, no ads required service. By using Yahoo's search engine, which has had millions in R&D invested in it in the years since Yahoo boomed in the 1990s, web developers were able to get much higher quality results than if they built their own search engine. On August 17, 2010, Yahoo stated that BOSS would require some sort of ad or fee-based model to sustain itself.

== BOSS Hosted Search ==
BOSS Hosted Search was a completely self serve product that enabled any web site owner to embed Yahoo web search experience on their site for free. The search experience was hosted by Yahoo and provided in an iframe which could be embedded on any web site. The search experience was very similar to that of search.yahoo.com. The product was provided free and web site owners got a percentage of the ad revenue share if any user clicked on a search ad within the frame. Web site owners could also customize the iframe by adding their own partner logo next to the search box, removing left rail, or removing the Yahoo search box altogether (and using their own). For implementing BOSS Hosted Search iframe, web site owners needed to simply sign up at Yahoo Search BOSS Portal and copy/paste a Javascript code snippet on their site. Yahoo also launched reporting module to provide web site owners with more insights on how many searches were conducted through BOSS Hosted Search and the revenue which they have generated.

== Usage ==
According to a Yahoo press meeting in 2009, there were 30 million queries a day being run through BOSS powered web search pages.

== See also ==
- Google Custom Search
