= Yahoo Gallery =

Yahoo! Gallery was a service from Yahoo! that provided applications using Yahoo! technologies. It was shut down on July 14, 2009. The site now redirects to Yahoo! Home Page.
