= Yahoo Podcasts =

Yahoo! Podcasts
- Website type: Podcast directory
- Owner: Yahoo!
- Creator: Yahoo!
- Website: podcasts.yahoo.com
- Commercial: Yes
- Registration: Free
- Launched: October 10, 2005; 20 years ago
- Current status: Defunct (discontinued on October 31, 2007)

Yahoo! Podcasts was a podcasting directory service that let users download, stream online, subscribe (via RSS) and review podcasts. It also allowed users to search for podcasts or browse from a podcast directory.

Yahoo! shut down the service on October 31, 2007.
