= SSENSE =

Canadian clothing retailer

- Industry: Fashion
- Founded: 2003
- Founder: Rami Atallah, Firas Atallah, Bassel Atallah
- Headquarters: Montreal, Quebec, Canada
- Website: www.ssense.com

SSENSE (pronounced: "essence") is a Canadian multi-brand retailer headquartered in Montreal, Quebec, specializing in the sale of designer fashion and high end streetwear. It was founded as an e-commerce platform in 2003 by three brothers: Rami, Bassel and Firas Atallah. The company delivers to 114 countries around the world and operates websites in Chinese, French, English, Japanese and Korean. In 2025, SSENSE filed for bankruptcy protection with $371 million CAD of debt, including over $93 million CAD owed to vendors.

== History ==
SSENSE was found in 2003 by brothers Firas, Rami and Bassel Atallah.

The company opened a physical store in Montreal in 2004 and a warehouse and corporate headquarters in 2005. The online store followed in 2006.

By the early 2020s, Ssense was discussed as an important online fashion store, which made decisions by analysing large volumes of data rather than relying on professional buyers anticipating trends.

On April 5, 2018, SSENSE acquired community-based fashion and art website Polyvore from Yahoo!, immediately shutting it down. SSENSE failed to alert its users about the acquisition following its liquidation, which resulted in users irreversibly losing their data on the platform. SSENSE has issued an apology about the matter.

In May 2018, SSENSE opened a flagship retail store in a historic 19th century building in Montreal turned into an experiential retail space by architecture firm David Chipperfield. The 5-story building within a building includes a cafe, art space and a floor dedicated to a personal-shopper-guided online-offline hybrid, which is accessible by appointment only.

In June 2021 SSENSE received minority investment from Sequoia Capital that valued the company at over $4 billion USD.

In December 2022, SSENSE was the target of a cyberattack where confidential employee data was compromised. SSENSE failed to notify past employees of the data breach as well as government officials.

In January 2023, SSENSE laid off approximately 7% of its workforce, impacting 138 employees.

In 2025, SSENSE went into creditor protection under the Companies' Creditors Arrangement Act, blaming increased tariffs on imports to the United States for the financial downturn. The company put itself up for sale in an effort to be taken over by its creditors.

== See also ==
- Retail apocalypse
- YOOX Net-a-Porter Group
- Clicks and mortar
- Mytheresa
- Farfetch
- Polyvore
