= Flurry (company) =

American analytics, monetization and advertising company

- Type: Subsidiary
- Industry: Advertising, Mobile
- Founded: 2005; 21 years ago
- Founders: Sean Byrnes, Dan Scholnick, and Gabriel Vanrenen
- Defunct: March 15, 2024
- Number of locations: San Francisco, New York City, London, Mumbai
- Key people: Simon Khalaf (CEO & president)
- Products: Flurry for Advertisers; Flurry for Publishers; Flurry Analytics
- Number of employees: 150
- Parent: Yahoo! Inc.
- Website: flurry.com

Flurry was an American mobile analytics, monetization, and advertising company founded in 2005. The company developed and marketed a platform for analyzing consumer interactions with mobile applications, packages for marketers to advertise in-apps, as well as a service for applying monetization structures to mobile apps. Flurry analyzed 150 billion app sessions per month. The company's analytics platform tracked application sessions in iOS, Android, HTML5, and JavaME platforms. Flurry raised a total of $65 million in funding since its founding and in March 2014 announced that it would partner with Research Now to create a panel database on mobile users. Flurry was acquired by Yahoo! on July 21, 2014, for somewhere between $200 and $300 million.

== History ==
Flurry was launched in 2005 by entrepreneurs Sean Byrnes, Dan Scholnick, and Gabriel Vanrenen. It first started as a premium mobile applications company, that grew mostly in the developing world. As the team realized that it would be hard to monetize through advertising in these markets, they decided to pivot into a universal analytics platform that all mobile apps could use.

The Flurry analytics and advertising platform really started to take off with the advent of the iPhone, with its own App Store, and soon after Flurry became the de facto analytics platform for mobile apps.

Flurry also merged with a company called Pinch Media based in New York that was working on a similar product, and together they had almost 80% marketshare for mobile analytics.

== Services ==
=== Flurry Analytics ===
Flurry Analytics enabled users to analyze consumer behavior through data observations. The platform provided features for user segmentation, consumer funnels, and app portfolio analysis. The user segments could be categorized by things such as paying versus non-paying customers or light versus heavy users. The platform's funnels measure customized consumer conversions and trending metrics, while the portfolio analytics feature allowed companies to manage entire portfolios of mobile applications with the ability to monitor data about overlap among applications as well as up-sell and cross-sell conversions.

=== Flurry for Advertisers (formerly AppCircle) ===
Flurry utilized data-sets gathered from its base of 1.3 billion monthly active devices to help brands and app marketers segment and reach their desired audience in apps. Flurry for Advertisers used information about app behavior and preferences to segment consumers into behavioral categories, called Personas, that advertisers could then reach with relevant messages about other apps or brand advertisements.

=== Flurry for Publishers (formerly AppSpot) ===
Flurry for Publishers was a data-driven tool for generating advertising revenue through mobile applications. The monetization platform provided features such as ad serving, network mediation, targeting, and reporting. Flurry for Publishers also included an auction-based real-time bidding marketplace which used Flurry data to facilitate the buying and selling of advertising inventory based on an impression-by-impression basis.
