= WUF Networks =

Software company acquired by Yahoo!

WUF Networks, Inc.
- Type: Subsidiary
- Industry: Computer software
- Founded: 2003
- Founders: Turochas Fuad; Francois Dumas
- Fate: Acquired
- Successor: Yahoo!
- Products: Digital media networking software
- Parent: Yahoo! (acquired late 2004)

WUF Networks, Inc. was a software company that developed applications intended to simplify the control and access of digital content — music, photos, and video — among networked devices, including consumer electronics, mobile devices and personal computers. The company was founded by Turochas Fuad and Francois Dumas in 2003, and was acquired by Yahoo in late 2004.

The company's software allowed digital content to follow its owner regardless of where the content was originally stored. It automatically aggregated and publicized the digital content across what the company called users' "personal network", including their home PC, media center computer or mobile phone. Because the content was streamed, WUF's application avoided copyright infringement and IP concerns over the illegal copying of music and video.

With the advent of Apple's iPod, several companies worked to enable mobile phones and other handheld and portable devices with the ability to access music (and subsequently video) over the network in a legal manner.
