= Inquisitor (magazine) =

Gaming magazine

Cover of Issue #3, 1992

Inquisitor, subtitled "A 40K Forum", is a game magazine published by Armorcast that focussed on Games Workshop's tabletop science fiction miniature wargame Warhammer 40,000

== Description ==
After Games Workshop (GW) published the first edition of Warhammer 40,000 in 1987, Tim DuPertuis of Santa Rosa, California became interested in the game, and in 1991 began to publish a quarterly fanzine called Inquisitor. At about the same time, GW licensed Mike Blasi to create new Warhammer vehicles. In 1995 DuPertuis formed a licensing agreement with veteran Warhammer model creator Mike Blasi and created the company Armorcast to produce their models. Inquisitor remained a separate entity outside of Armorcast.

Each issue of the quarterly was 8.5" x 11" in size, 28 pages in length, and printed in black & white. In addition to major articles, each issue also featured reviews, reader requests for new models, a rules question & answer column, and convention news. The magazine ended publication after 18 issues.

== Reviews ==
In the February 1993 edition of Dragon (Issue 190), Rick Swan praised Inquisitor for featuring "a cornucopia of scenarios, statistics, and modelling hints" for fans while remaining focused "squarely on the nuts and bolts of the game system", thus avoiding some short-comings common to other fanzines. Swan highlighted the sections for rules questions and answers and new units with stats, and was impressed with the layout and overall high production value.
