= Bix (website) =

Web service known for online competitions

Bix, Inc.
- Industry: Internet, Software, & Music
- Founded: February 2006; 20 years ago
- Fate: Discontinued
- Headquarters: Sunnyvale, California, U.S.
- Key people: Stewart Bonn; Echeyde Cubillo; Jeff Cordova; Leonard Speiser; Mike Speiser (co-founders)
- Products: Online video karaoke recorder and contest website
- Number of employees: 12
- Parent: Yahoo

Bix was a web service that was best known for its online competitions. The site provided self-service tools for the creation of contests. After a user created the contest, other members could enter and vote on the outcome of those contests. The company was founded in February 2006 and received venture funding from Trinity Ventures and Sutter Hill Ventures.

== History ==
The website officially launched in July 2006 with a web-based video recorder that merged a user's karaoke performance to create a contest entry. The site received strong praise from industry experts including Walt Mossberg of the WSJ. Within a few months the site opened up contests for audio karaoke, videos, photos and text. In November 2006 the site switched to a faceoff style voting system, increasing votes from 5000 a day to 150,000 a day. Site votes reached as much as 1,000,000 in a day in 2007. Users voted 25 times per visit on average.

Bix's competitors included Singshot (discontinued) and Worth1000.

== Yahoo! acquisition ==
Yahoo! acquired Bix on November 16, 2006. The company moved from downtown Palo Alto to Yahoo's main campus in March 2007. Bix generated revenue by running contests for corporate clients. Customers included Extra (TV series), Black Entertainment Television, The Game, Capitol Records and Electronic Arts.

Bix was shut down by Yahoo June 30, 2009.

== Patents for Bix ==
- Automated Reward Management for Network-Based Contests
- Network Based Content Creation
- Automated Administration of Networked-Based Contests
