= GeoPlanet =

GeoPlanet is a computer platform for coordinating world-wide geographic information, and providing both text and cartographic output, such as digital maps for any location in the world. It provides a location infrastructure for search engines, portals and both Web and WAP sites. It was developed by GDC, a London-based geographic information company, which was acquired by Whereonearth in 1998. When Whereonearth spun off GDC in 2002, it kept GeoPlanet. When Yahoo! purchased Whereonearth in 2005, it acquired GeoPlanet.

An integral part of GeoPlanet is the WOEID (Where On Earth IDentifier), a unique 32-bit reference identifier, now assigned by Yahoo!, that identifies any feature on Earth. In addition to the strict numerical WOEID, GeoPlanet also has a hierarchical structure that allows accessing surrounding locations, and zooming up and down administrative divisions. In 2009, Yahoo! released GeoPlanet's WOEID data to the public, but the last release was on 1 June 2012 after which Yahoo! decided to cease making the data downloadable until they "determine a better way to surface the data as a part of the service".

In June 2015, Yahoo announced that the GeoPlanet APIs would be dropped as the functionality is now available through their Yahoo Query Language and BOSS APIs. The GeoPlanet APIs stopped responding to requests in late August 2016.
