= Microsoft pubCenter =

Online advertising application

pubCenter
- Developer: Microsoft
- Preview release: Beta / November 09, 2009
- Operating system: Web service, Windows, Windows Phone
- Type: Online advertising
- Website: pubcenter.microsoft.com

Microsoft pubCenter, formerly Content Ads, is a publisher's ad serving application developed by Microsoft in addition to Microsoft's Bing Ads, which allows advertisers to place ads on search engines as well as select MSN web sites or applications.

== Overview ==
Microsoft pubCenter is available for Windows Application, Windows Phone Apps and web publishers. Originally, PubCenter was closed to new publishers but has since been opened up to other categories. Publishers or owners can register in this program using Microsoft account to earn revenue while enabling their application's audience with valuable ads experience on their websites and Windows Phone applications. These advertisements are administered by Microsoft and produce revenue on a per-click basis.

== Timeline ==
On February 23, 2009, Publisher Leadership Council was created under the umbrella of Microsoft Advertising. The council was responsible to deliver the next-generation advertising platform for the publishers of digital media.

On June 6, 2012, Microsoft Advertising announced the introduction of pubCenter to seventeen new markets including Austria, Brazil, Chile, Colombia, Czech Republic, Greece, Hungary, Ireland, Israel, Luxemburg, New Zealand, Poland, Portugal, Singapore, South Africa, South Korea and Taiwan. This announcement brings the pubCenter platform to a total of thirty-six supported markets.

On August 28, 2015, pubCenter announced the integration with the Windows Store app developer portal, Dev Center. All reporting, ad creation and payment of advertising is to be managed going forward through the Windows Dev Center.

Microsoft Advertising began trialling a pubCenter "Next" in May of 2023, and the relaunch aimed toward small and medium-sized businesses was officially announced on October 26, 2023.
