= Koprol =

Indonesian social networking service

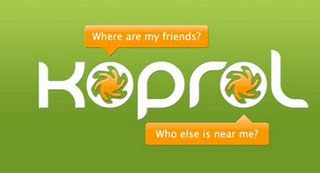
The first logo of Koprol before acquisition by Yahoo!

Koprol, since 25 May 2010 called Yahoo Koprol, was an Indonesian social networking service, allowing users to connect based on location. Mobile users can use the site as a positioning service, without the need for a GPS receiver. Once logged in, users can see other members who were in nearby location.

At its peak, Koprol was used by approximately 1.5 million users worldwide. Although the majority of its users were based in Indonesia, the service was also used in several other countries, including Singapore, the Philippines, Vietnam, and the United States.

In late June 2012, Yahoo decided to close Koprol on August 28, 2012. However, in late July 2012, Yahoo! reached an agreement with Satya Witoelar, Fajar Budiprasetyo, and Daniel Armanto – the founders of Koprol – to return all the rights associated with the trademark and domain names.

== Early establishment ==
Koprol development was started in July 2008 by PT SkyEight Indonesia. It was specifically created for mobile devices. It was released in February 2009, allowing users to post their present location and short status updates, and see other members in the same location. At that point, the location data was limited to Jakarta, with plans to expand it to other Indonesian cities such as Bandung, Yogyakarta, and Denpasar. Founder Satya Witoelar states as he and co-developers Fajar Budiprasetyo, Leo Laksmana, and Daniel Armanto developed the site, they took inspiration from a variety of competing foreign social networks, including Plurk, Twitter, Lifestream, and Brightkite.

== Features ==
Koprol allows users to post a 200 character status message, and attach their current location to the message. Beta features allow users to post other content, such as videos and photos. Koprol features integration with cell phones, Twitter, Facebook, and also a native BlackBerry application. Since November 2009, users were able to log in using their Yahoo! account.

On the back-end, Koprol uses the Ubuntu operating system, the Apache web server, Passenger, Ruby Enterprise Edition, Ruby on Rails, and MySQL 5.

== Acquisition ==
On May 25, 2010, American company Yahoo announced that it had acquired Koprol for an undisclosed value. Yahoo had previously considered a US$100 million acquisition of Foursquare, a US-based location-based social network. Yahoo spokeswoman Rose Tsou stated that "Koprol was uniquely designed for mobile phones and within a year has already built a strong user base" and indicated that Yahoo plans to introduce the service in other markets.

Koprol integrated Yahoo itself since before the Yahoo Open Hack Day event in 2009, Koprol became one of Yahoo's local partners using multiple technologies such as the Yahoo API: Yahoo Fire Eagle, Yahoo Login, and Yahoo Contacts.

== Miscellaneous ==
Koprol means Somersault in Dutch. Indonesia is a former Dutch colony. Amongst Indonesian internet users, 'koprol' is slang for ‘an act of changing physical location or position’
