= Wretch (website) =

Former Taiwanese community website

- Website type: Blog
- Available in: Multilingual
- Headquarters: Taiwan
- Industry: Social networking service
- Services: Blog
- Commercial: Yes
- Registration: Optional
- Current status: Defunct

Wretch (Chinese: 無名小站; pinyin: wúmíng xiǎo zhàn) was a Taiwanese community website. In Chinese, its name means Nameless Little Site.

Wretch provided free photo album, and blog hosting services. Four languages, including English, were available. A more extensive VIP version was offered.

The domain wretch.cc attracted at least 4 million visitors annually by 2008 according to a Compete.com survey.

In July 2007, Yahoo acquired Wretch for $22 million; this became the biggest acquisition of Yahoo in Taiwan since Kimo.

Wretch.cc has been blocked by the internet censorship in the People's Republic of China since August 2007.

On 30 August 2013, Yahoo announced Wretch would be closed on 26 December, along with Yahoo! Blog.

Yahoo released an iOS mobile app for Wretch.
