= Whereonearth =

British company

- Type: Subsidiary
- Founded: 1995; 31 years ago, in the United Kingdom
- Headquarters: United Kingdom
- Parent: Yahoo!

Whereonearth was a company based in the United Kingdom and was acquired by Yahoo! on October 18, 2005.

The technology company worked with Hutchson and Yahoo.

The company was founded in 1995 with a purpose of producing geocoding technology for partners. In 1998 it acquired GDC, and GDC's global geo-database, GeoPlanet. In 2002, the company was awarded a contract to deliver the underlying technology for Hutchison 3G geo services.

In 2002, the company spun off GDC in a management buyout, but retained GeoPlanet. In 2003 the company again reorganized with a view of generating web technology for geolocation, named InternetLocality, for the extraction of location information out of web content and web searches, which eventually led to the Yahoo acquisition in 2005 for integration with Yahoo! Search Marketing project Panama. The whereonearth internet toolset is partly available as part of the Yahoo Developer network.
