= Yahoo Inc. (2017–present) =

American technology company

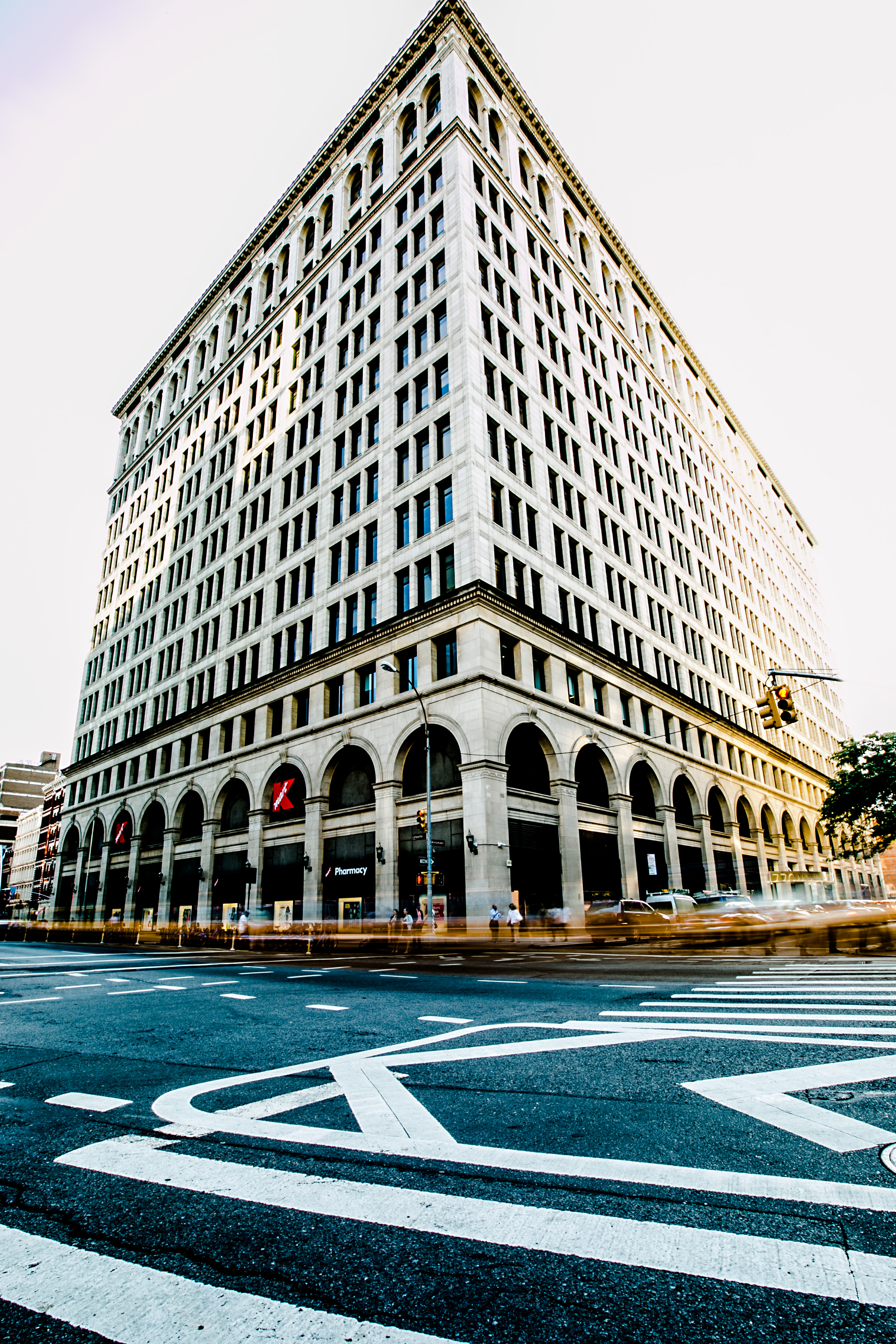
- Yahoo! Inc. headquarters, 770 Broadway, New York City
- Formerly: Oath Inc. (2017–2019); Verizon Media (2019–2021)
- Type: Subsidiary
- Industry: Internet; Media; Technology
- Predecessors: Yahoo! Inc. (1995–2017); AOL
- Founded: June 13, 2017; 9 years ago (as Oath); January 8, 2019; 7 years ago (as Verizon Media); September 1, 2021; 5 years ago (as Yahoo!)
- Headquarters: New York City, New York, US
- Area served: Worldwide
- Key people: Jim Lanzone (CEO)
- Brands: Yahoo; Yahoo! Sports; Yahoo! Fantasy; Yahoo! Finance; Yahoo! Mail; Yahoo Native; Yahoo! News; Yahoo! Life; Yahoo! Entertainment; Yahoo! Search; MAKERS
- Services: Digital media; Software; Online advertising; Online services
- Owners: Apollo Global Management (90%); Verizon (10%)
- Number of employees: 14,000 (2017)
- Subsidiaries: Flurry
- ASN: 10310
- Website: www.yahooinc.com

Yahoo Inc. (sometimes stylized as Yahoo! Inc.) is an American multinational technology company that focuses on media and online business. Its major products include Yahoo, Yahoo Mail, Yahoo News, Yahoo Finance, Yahoo Sports, and Yahoo Native.

After acquiring the company in 2017 for $4.48 billion, Verizon folded the company into a subsidiary called Oath Inc. In December 2018, Verizon announced it would write-down the combined value of its purchases of AOL and Yahoo by $4.6 billion, roughly half; the company was renamed Verizon Media the following month in January 2019.

In September 2021, funds managed by Apollo Global Management acquired 90% of the company for roughly $5 billion; Verizon retained a 10% stake in the company.

Yahoo Inc. was formed on September 1, 2021 as part of a corporate restructure. It is organized in Delaware and is headquartered in Manhattan, New York.

Jim Lanzone became CEO of Yahoo in 2021.

== History ==
=== Under Verizon (2017–2021) ===
A year after the completion of the AOL acquisition, Verizon announced a $4.8 billion deal to acquire Yahoo's core Internet business, to invest in the Internet company's search engine, news, finance, sports, video, emails and Tumblr products. Yahoo announced in September and December 2016 two major Internet security breaches affecting more than a billion customers. As a result, Verizon lowered its offer for Yahoo by $350 million to $4.48 billion.

The AOL deal and subsequent Yahoo purchase were led by Verizon's management team, including Lowell McAdam (CEO), Marni Walden (EVP Product) and Tim Armstrong. Walden had been tasked with merging the two entities and delivering on the promise of moving Verizon from an analog to digital platforms business.

Oath logo, 2017–2019

Two months before closing the deal for Yahoo, Verizon announced it would place Yahoo and AOL under an umbrella named Oath. The deal closed on June 13, 2017, and Oath was launched. Upon completion of the deal, Yahoo CEO Marissa Mayer resigned. Yahoo operations not acquired in the deal were renamed Altaba, a holding company whose primary assets were its 15.5 percent stake in Alibaba Group and a 35.5 percent stake in Yahoo! Japan. After the merger, Oath cut fifteen percent of the Yahoo-AOL workforce. In 2018, Altaba sold Yahoo! Japan to SoftBank Group.

In April 2018, Helios and Matheson Analytics acquired the Moviefone movie listings website from Oath, in consideration for which Verizon took a stake in Helios and Matheson. Also in April 2018, Verizon sold Flickr to SmugMug, for an undisclosed amount.

In May 2018, Verizon and Samsung agreed to terms that would preload four Oath mobile apps onto Samsung Galaxy S9 smartphones. The agreement includes Oath's Newsroom, Yahoo Sports, Yahoo! Finance, and go90 mobile video apps (closed in July 2018), with integration of native Oath advertisements into both the Oath apps and Samsung's own Galaxy and Game Launcher apps.

On September 12, 2018, it was announced that K. Guru Gowrappan would succeed Tim Armstrong as CEO, effective October 1.

On December 3, 2018, the company banned "adult content" from Tumblr effective December 17, 2018. The ban led to objections that it harms the LGBTQ community, sexual abuse survivors, sex workers, adult content blogs, and other bloggers. The ban followed Apple's removal of the Tumblr app from the App Store because Apple objected to child pornography. Some speculated Tumblr's ban was an attempt to regain access to the App Store.

In December 2018, Verizon announced that it was cutting 10% of Oath's workforce and would write down the value of the business by $4.6B. Verizon management blamed competitive pressures and that the business never achieved the anticipated benefits. The move wiped out all of the goodwill on the balance sheets that accompanied the acquisitions.

Verizon Media logo, 2019–2021

On January 8, 2019, Oath was renamed Verizon Media. In August 2019, Verizon sold Tumblr to Automattic, the owner of WordPress.com, for an undisclosed amount that was reportedly less than $3 million. In November 2020, Verizon sold HuffPost to BuzzFeed. in an all-stock deal, remaining minority shareholder in BuzzFeed.

As of December 2019, the company employed about 10,350 people.

It reported $7.4 billion revenue in 2020.

=== As Yahoo (2021–present) ===
On May 3, 2021, Verizon announced that the Verizon Media would be acquired by Apollo Global Management for roughly $5 billion, and would simply be known as Yahoo following the closure of the deal, with Verizon retaining a minor 10% stake in the new group. The acquisition was completed on September 1, 2021, with the company now known as Yahoo Also in May 2021, Yahoo shut down the Yahoo Answers service, which had been operational since 2005.

On September 10, 2021, Jim Lanzone, who had been CEO of Tinder, was named CEO of Yahoo, succeeding Gowrappan.

Yahoo acquired start-up The Factual in August 2022 to add algorithmically generated accuracy ratings to Yahoo News stories. In October 2022, Yahoo announced it would buy nearly 25% of Taboola, becoming its largest shareholder. The 30-year contract gave Taboola rights to sell native advertising across Yahoo's sites.

In 2023, Yahoo introduced Backstage, a product allowing advertisers to purchase publisher inventory directly from Yahoo's demand-side platform (DSP) without needing a supply-side platform. Within one year, 82% of advertisers buying through the Yahoo DSP had used Backstage.

In April 2023, Yahoo acquired Wagr, a peer-to-peer sports betting app, integrating it into Yahoo Sports. Yahoo also acquired CommonStock, a social platform for retail investors, in August 2023.

Yahoo Creators, a publishing platform giving influencers a share of ad revenue, launched in March 2024. By July 2025, the program included 135 creators.

Yahoo acquired AI news tool Artifact in April 2024, incorporating its technology into an updated version of the Yahoo News app that debuted two months later.

In August 2025, with the possibility of regulators requiring the Google Chrome web browser to be sold, Yahoo Inc was one of three companies (alongside Perplexity and OpenAI) that were in talks to acquire Chrome. However, a sale was not required by regulators and any deals talks were called off.

In October 2025, Yahoo reached a $1.5 billion deal to sell AOL to the Italian conglomerate Bending Spoons. The purchase was quietly completed in January 2026.

== Brands ==
Digital media brands under Yahoo include:

- Yahoo
- Yahoo! Sports
- Yahoo! Fantasy
- Yahoo! Finance
- Yahoo! Mail
- Yahoo! News
- Yahoo! Life
- Yahoo! Entertainment
- Yahoo! Search
- MAKERS

The company also owns the Yahoo Native advertising platform (formerly known as Yahoo! Advertising, Yahoo! Search Marketing and Yahoo! Gemini), and the Yahoo DSP demand side platform.

=== Stakes ===
- Taboola (25%)

=== Divested ===
- Flickr (sold to SmugMug in 2018)
- Moviefone (sold to Helios and Matheson in 2018)
- Polyvore (sold and merged into SSENSE in 2018)
- MapQuest (sold to System1 in 2019)
- Tumblr (sold to WordPress.com owner Automattic in 2019)
- HuffPost (sold to BuzzFeed in 2020)
- Edgecast (sold and merged into Edgio in 2022)
- Autoblog (sold to The Arena Group in 2024)
- TechCrunch (sold to the private equity firm Regent LP in 2025)
- Rivals (sold to the private equity firm On3.com in 2025)
- AOL (sold to the technology conglomerate Bending Spoons in 2026)
- Engadget (sold to Static Media in 2026)

It had partial ownership of Moviefone's former parent company, Helios and Matheson Analytics Inc., until its liquidation in 2020.

=== Discontinued ===
- Alto Mail (discontinued on December 10, 2017)
- AIM (discontinued on December 15, 2017)
- go90 (closed on July 31, 2018)
- Yahoo! Messenger (discontinued on July 17, 2018)
- Yahoo! Together (discontinued in April 2019)
- Yahoo Mobile (discontinued in August 2021)
