= Yahoo Mash =

Social networking service

Yahoo! Mash was a social networking service by Yahoo!

Yahoo! Mash pages were composed of modules, such as photos or common friends, that could be added by their users or their contacts.

Unless the feature was disabled, users were able to edit other users' pages.

== History ==
The platform was launched by Yahoo! in September 2007.

On August 28, 2008, Yahoo! announced that the platform would be shut down on September 28, 2008.
