= Yahoo Voice =

Former telecommunications service (2007–2013)

- Developer(s): Yahoo
- Operating system: Microsoft Windows; Mac OS X
- Type: VoIP, Internet Phone service
- License: free
- Website: voice.yahoo.com

Yahoo Voice was a Voice over Internet Protocol (VoIP), PC-PC, PC-Phone and Phone-to-PC telecommunications service. It was provided by Yahoo via its Yahoo Messenger instant messaging application.

Yahoo Voice used the Session Initiation Protocol (SIP), GIPS codec and the Dialpad engine for voice transport. After 2008 the service was provided by JAJAH, an external VoIP provider.

In July 2012, Yahoo Voice was compromised and 453,491 email addresses and passwords were stolen using SQL injection. A 17 MB text file containing the stolen passwords was released by a group of hackers called D33DS company. Yahoo announced the end of Yahoo Voice on January 30, 2013.

== Yahoo Phone Out ==
PC-to-Phone calls to landlines and mobile phones was provided via the Yahoo Phone Out service. Conference calls from PC to Multiple (PSTN) phones or mobiles was not supported.

== Yahoo Phone In ==
Phone-to-PC calls can be received from landline or mobile phones. With Yahoo Phone In users could choose a phone number from three countries (US, UK and France).

== Unsupported functionality ==
- Voice call encryption
- PC-Phone (Multiple) Conference calls

== See also ==
- Yahoo Messenger
- VoIP
- Comparison of VoIP software
