= Yahoo 360° =

Social network service

Yahoo! 360° Yahoo! Pulse
- Website type: Social network service
- Owner: Yahoo!
- Creator: Yahoo!
- Website: 360.yahoo.com pulse.yahoo.com
- Commercial: Yes
- Registration: Yahoo! account
- Launched: March 29, 2005; 21 years ago
- Current status: Defunct

Yahoo! 360° Plus Vietnam
- Vietnamese version of Yahoo! 360°
- Website type: Social network service
- Dissolved: June 2012
- Owner: Yahoo!
- Creator: Yahoo!
- Website: vn.360plus.yahoo.com
- Commercial: No
- Registration: Yahoo! account
- Launched: May 2008; 18 years ago
- Current status: Defunct

Yahoo! Blog
- Website type: Social network service
- Owner: Yahoo!
- Creator: Yahoo!
- Website: blog.yahoo.com
- Commercial: No
- Registration: Yahoo! account
- Launched: 2011; 15 years ago
- Current status: Defunct

Yahoo! 360° was a social networking and personal communication portal operated by Yahoo!, made available in 2005. It enabled users to create personal websites, share photos from Yahoo! Photos, maintain blogs and lists, create and share public profiles, and see which friends were currently online. 360° also featured a 'friends updates' section, under which each friend's latest update was summarized (e.g., blog posts, updated lists, or newly shared photos). This service was never officially launched; Yahoo! prematurely stopped developing it in 2008.

Yahoo! 360° Plus Vietnam was a similar service that was launched in 2008 and is now defunct. The service that had been available in Vietnam until June 2012, then it was substituted by Yahoo! Blog. Finally, Yahoo! Blog Vietnam was officially shut down on January 17, 2013. The user could make a backup to PC, Wordpress, Blogger, or Vietnamese-blog Zing Blog (which was a main choice) by using http://download.blog.yahoo.com.

== History ==
Yahoo 360° launched as an invitation-only service on March 29, 2005. After the full launch on June 24, 2005, it became available to any Yahoo! user over the age of 18 in the United States, the United Kingdom, France, Germany, Canada, Australia, Japan and Vietnam.

From September 2006 through September 2007, the US-based web traffic visiting 360° dropped by more than half. The service had a more global appeal than some of its counterparts, but its global visits also saw a significant drop during the same time frame.

On October 16, 2007, Yahoo announced that they would no longer provide support for or perform bug fixes on Yahoo! 360° as they intend to abandon it in early 2008 in favor of a "universal profile" that will be similar to their Yahoo! Mash experimental system. They have, however, said, that it will not be replaced with Mash itself.

On May 6, 2008, Yahoo announced that they have several Vietnam-centric initiatives as part of their Southeast Asia business strategies. One of these initiatives were Yahoo! 360° Plus Vietnam, a new Vietnamese blogging application. Subsequently, Yahoo! 360° Plus Vietnam was launched in Vietnam along with other new services for Yahoo! Vietnam such as Yahoo! Music (no longer active since 2009). By the end of January 2010, the number of registered users has increased to 1,500,000.

In May 2009, while the service was still in Beta stage of development, Yahoo! announced that Yahoo! 360° service will be officially closed on July 13, 2009, as Yahoo! developers aimed to "focus their efforts on the new profile on Yahoo". Users were given options to move their Yahoo! 360° information and blog to the new profile before this deadline. Yahoo! 360° Plus Vietnam, however, is still active.

On August 30, 2013, Yahoo! announced Yahoo! Blog would be closed on December 26.

== Features ==
Features introduced with 360°:

- Themes – custom and prebuilt
- Blogs (with RSS feeds)
- Lists – where users may compile interests, favorite movies, books, and so on
- Feeds – where users may include RSS feeds for themselves and others from favorite sources
- Photos – users may share their public photo albums from Flickr.com
- Blasts – quick posts or ideas that are neither published in the blog nor archived
- Testimonials – "review" and praise individuals
- Groups – connect to users sharing similar interests
- Friend Updates – view latest activities from friends
- Quick Comments – leave short messages on other people's pages
- LAUNCHcast – share music stations and tastes
- Reviews from Yahoo! Local, Yahoo! Shopping, Yahoo! Travel and Yahoo! Games

=== Integration with Yahoo! Messenger ===
Since v8.0, Yahoo! Messenger built in features that allowed users to view 360° page, update blasts, post blog entries and view friend updates from within Messenger. This integration allowed Messenger users to view their contacts' pages and alerted users when their contacts' updated their page.

=== Integration with other Yahoo! services ===
Yahoo! 360° integrated with several Yahoo! services. These include:

- Flickr
- LAUNCH
- Yahoo! Avatars
- GeoCities
- Yahoo! Groups
- Yahoo! Local
- Yahoo! Shopping
- Yahoo! Travel
- Yahoo! Games
