= Yahoo Search =

Web search engine

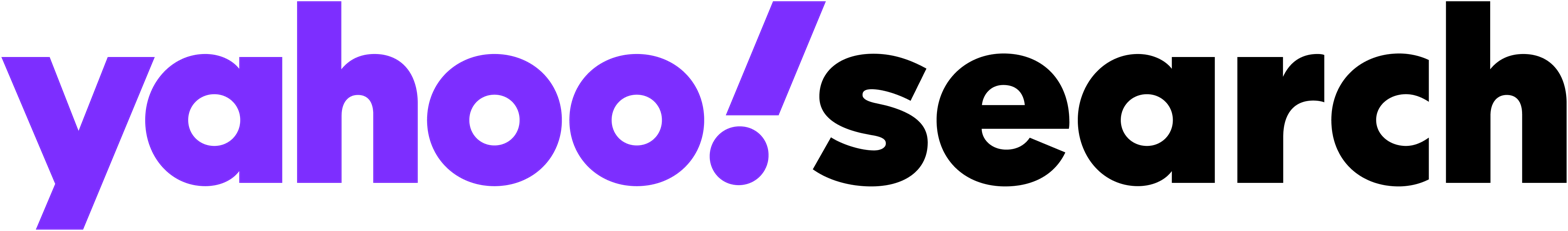
- Website type: Web search engine
- Available in: Multilingual (40)
- Owner: Yahoo Inc.
- Website: search.yahoo.com
- Commercial: Yes
- Registration: Optional
- Launched: March 2, 1995; 31 years ago
- Current status: Active
- Written in: PHP

Yahoo Search is a search engine owned and operated by Yahoo, using Microsoft Bing to generate results.

When first released in 1994, Yahoo Search sent queries to a searchable index of pages supplemented with its directory of websites. Web crawling and data housing was executed by Google from 2000 until 2004, when Yahoo created its own crawler.

In July 2009, Yahoo and Microsoft made a deal in which Bing would generate Yahoo Search results. Google provided some results from 2015 to 2018.

As of August 2025, Yahoo had a search market share in the U.S. of 3.22 percent.

== History ==
=== Development of search technology ===
Yahoo Search began as a tool to search Yahoo! Directory, which was launched in 1994 by Jerry Yang and David Filo, then students at Stanford University. It became the first popular search engine on the Web, despite being manually curated, unlike its competitors. In 2000, Yahoo Search began licensing results from Google Search. Seeking to provide its own search engine results, in December 2002 Yahoo announced it would acquire search engine company Inktomi. The acquisition completed in March 2003.

Yahoo! Search page in 2005

In October 2003, Yahoo purchased Overture Services, Inc., which included the AlltheWeb and AltaVista search engines. In February 2004, Yahoo Search replaced Google's results with results from its own web crawler, Yahoo Search Technology. Yahoo Search Technology combined the capabilities of search engine companies Yahoo had acquired. The next month, the site began practicing paid inclusion to guarantee listing in search; however, most results continued to come from free web crawling.

In 2005, Yahoo Search results began including links to previous versions of pages archived on the Wayback Machine.

=== Evolution of search features ===
Yahoo released Panama, its updated sponsored search platform, in 2007. The platform introduced ad matching based on a mix of bid prices, ad quality, and relevance to the user. Also in 2007, Yahoo released OneSearch, its Internet search system for mobile phones. Yahoo used Novarra's mobile content transcoding service for OneSearch.

In October 2007, Yahoo Search added Search Assist, which provided real-time query suggestions and related concepts as queries were typed. The site also added search for audio, video, and photos. Yahoo began piloting Search Shortcuts, which highlighted key information like ratings and reviews and official sites in search results. Yahoo Shortcuts, a separate tool, launched in December 2007 as a plugin to add contextual links and freely licensed Flickr photos to content on WordPress sites quickly.

SearchScan in action

In May 2008, Yahoo introduced SearchScan, a feature to alert search users of viruses, spyware and spam websites, with support from McAfee SiteAdvisor technology. That same month, Yahoo piloted a new search interface called Yahoo Glue, displaying different kinds of search results (e.g., photos and videos, in addition to hyperlinks) together on the same page. Yahoo Glue expanded to the US that November.

Yahoo! Search page in 2008

In July 2008, Yahoo Search introduced Yahoo Search BOSS ("Build your Own Search Service"). This service allows developers to use Yahoo's system for indexing information and images and create custom search engines.

Yahoo introduced Search Direct, which suggests results as the user types, in March 2011. The function aims to answer user questions without loading a new page. In 2012, the company released Yahoo Axis, a iOS app and desktop browser extension to provide a streamlined search experience. Axis displayed search results as visual snapshots in a horizontal carousel, allowing users to preview pages without leaving the results page. It was sunset in June 2013.

Yahoo published Aviate, its search application for Android devices, in June 2014. The app was updated with browser-less search six months later.

==== Multilanguage search ====
In 2005, Yahoo introduced an experimental option to searching called "Recherche multilingue" on Yahoo! France and "Suche Translator" on Yahoo! Deutschland, allowing users to enter search queries in French or German, and receive corresponding results in German, English, French, Italian, and Spanish, powered by AltaVista machine translation. This unique and innovative feature was never extended to other languages or countries, and was eventually discontinued.

=== Partnerships ===
In July 2009, Yahoo and Microsoft announced a deal in which Bing would provide results for Yahoo Search. In exchange, the deal also established a "search alliance" between Yahoo and Bing to sell advertising on both services, with Yahoo receiving 88% of search ad sales revenue on its site for the first five years, as well as the right to sell advertisements on certain Microsoft sites. The search alliance was implemented in 2010, and all Yahoo-sponsored ad clients transitioned to Microsoft adCenter by the end of the year.

Yahoo! Search page in 2011

In March 2014, Yahoo partnered with Yelp to integrate its reviews and user-contributed photos into Yahoo Search. In November 2014, Mozilla signed a five-year partnership with Yahoo, making Yahoo Search the default search engine for Firefox browsers in the US.

Yahoo and Microsoft modified their partnership in April 2015 to require Bing results only on the "majority" of desktop traffic, allowing Yahoo to enter into non-exclusive deals for search on mobile platforms and the remainder of desktop traffic. The amendment also gave either company the ability to terminate the contract with four months' notice. In October 2015, Yahoo reached an agreement with Google to provide services to Yahoo Search through the end of 2018, including advertising, search, and image search.

==== OneSearch ====
In January 2020, Yahoo's parent Verizon launched OneSearch, a privacy-focused search engine. OneSearch uses Bing search results. The service selects ads based on keywords rather than HTTP cookies. OneSearch mobile apps and browser extensions were last updated around 2022 (or between 2022–2024), and have since been taken down from most major providers (such as Apple's App Store and Google's Chrome Web Store). As of 2026, OneSearch is no longer supported by Yahoo.

== See also ==
- Comparison of web search engines
- List of search engines
- Yahoo Search BOSS
- Yahoo! SearchMonkey
