= Viewable impression =

In the online advertising industry, a viewable impression is a measure of whether a given advert was actually seen by a human being, as opposed to being out of view or served as the result of automated activity. The viewable impression guidelines are administered by the Media Rating Council and require that a minimum of 50% of the pixels in the advertisement be in an in-focus tab on the viewable space of the browser page for at least one continuous second.

The measurement of ad visibility was first introduced in 2008 by Alenty, and was the first system to deliver reports based on a viewable impression metric for standard Interactive Advertising Bureau (IAB) Display ad units, called RealV were developed by Rich Media Worldwide and accredited by the Media Rating Council on March 9, 2010. Other companies to offer viewable impressions include DMA-Institute, OnScroll, C3 Metrics, Comscore, and AdYapper, while MSNBC utilizes ServeView, a proprietary system in use since 2010.

The definition of a viewable impression may depend on the type of ad units and the reporting system. For example, a viewable impression for ads of pre-defined size delivered to pre-defined space on the content page is registered by RealVu when the ad content is loaded, rendered, and at least 60% of the ad surface area is within the visible area of a viewer's browser window on an in-focus web page for at least one second. Click-through is enabled at the moment of the "viewable impression".

Viewable impressions were developed as an improvement of the online impression metrics measured by the first ad servers developed in the mid-1990s, which analyze HTTP requests in a server log and cannot provide information on events fired by a viewer’s browser; thus, they cannot measure whether ad content was actually visible to a viewer.

== Overview ==
With the development of the first ad servers in 1995–1996, the assumption was that a requested ad was always available to the viewer of a requested web page. This allowed for the utilization of the server log file for collection of metadata to deliver a metric called the Online Impression that in traditional media meant an impression on a viewer.

This type of advertising metric was meant to resemble Television and print advertising methods for speculating the cost of an advertisement, with the promise of even more accuracy due to the interactive nature of the Internet eliminating the need for industry-accepted approximates such as Nielsen ratings for television and circulation figures for print publications.

The value of an ad traditionally was based upon an estimate of how many different people saw or heard the ad. The following are current accepted means of calculating CPM for different mediums:

1. CPM for print media (when audience data is available):

$$\text{Print CPM} = \frac{\text{Cost of 1 ad} \cdot 1000}{\text{Number of prospects reached}}$$

2. CPM for broadcast media:

$$\text{Broadcast CPM} = \frac{\text{Cost of 1 commercial} \cdot 1000}{\text{Number of prospects reached by commercial}}$$

With the advent of the Internet, through log file server collecting data, it was believed that ad views could be tracked with unprecedented accuracy and “number of different prospects reached” was removed from the equation, and a new CPM equation was created for the internet:

3. CPM for the Internet:

$$\text{Internet CPM} = \text{Cost per ad requested} \cdot 1000$$

However, the assumption that an ad requested from an ad server is always visible when the viewer is on the requested page was wrong. This was because the web page is usually longer than the height of a computer screen and other technical reasons. Eventually, it became apparent that a significant number of ad impressions measured for CPM pricing were never rendered in the visible area of a viewer’s browser screen.

== CPMV (cost per thousand viewable ads) ==
Until 2010 it was very common for large publishers to charge for most of their advertising inventory on a CPM or CPT basis. A related term, effective cost per mille (eCPM), is used to measure the effectiveness of advertising inventory sold (by the publisher) via a CPC, CPA, or CPT basis.

Partially to avoid the limitations of server-side impression methodology many models emerged that were based on direct response:

- CPC - Cost per click Through
- CPL - Cost per lead (lead usually meaning a free registration)
- CPS - Cost per sale
- dCPM - Dynamic CPM
- CPA – Cost per action

The Viewable Impression approach enables online advertising effectiveness to be analyzed based on stopping power, branding ability and level of engagement – the three key elements that drive purchase consideration and, ultimately, sales. Having no reliable way of measuring actual viewership, web publishers are vulnerable to payment methods that are based on performance-based advertising such as cost per click and cost per transaction. Since the publisher has no control or input on the demand and ad creative quality of the advertised product, web publishers lose control of their yield, giving away significant inventory to ads that are not clicked.

With the arrival of the Viewable Impression model, Cost per Thousand Viewable ads emerged. It is quoted in terms of CPMV. This model may eventually become the standard CPM as it is measured at the same point (of the view) as television or print.

== Architecture example ==
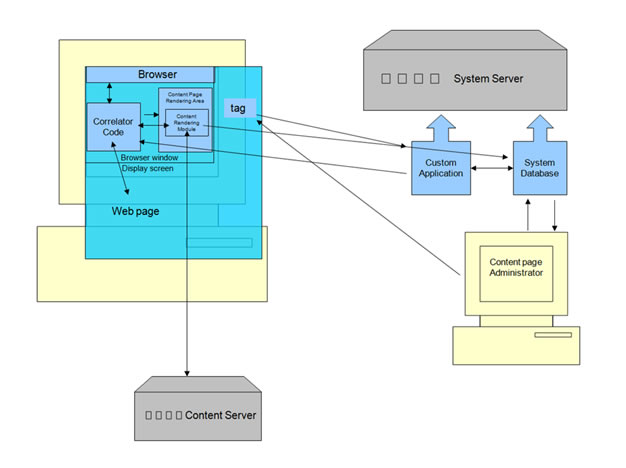
Viewable Impression Architecture

Viewable Impression relies on web bugs (or "tags") placed on the web pages or in the third-party ad servers that distribute ads on the website(s) content pages. These tags are placed on a web page and when rendered, employing a "Correlator" (a linear correlation control.) The ad space is then "marked up," an "ad request” (server log impression) is recorded, and the Correlator begins communicating with the web page, browser and ad unit (ad space) embedded in the webpage content. The Correlator can collect additional non-private information from the viewer’s browser, including the viewer’s operating system, browser type and version and a list of other ads that were previously rendered on the page to prevent duplication of ads on the content page. Once any portion of the ad unit (definable), on a viewer's in focus web page, hits the visible area of the browser window a request is sent to an ad content server to deliver an advertisement.

Once the ad content is loaded and rendered, an "Ad Rendered" is reported. The Correlator continues to monitor the ad space for each ad on the web page and its relation to the browser window dimensions, scrolling position and web page focus, considering if the viewer has scrolled the ad space in or out of the visible area of the browser window, minimized, tabbed away, or opened another browser or application window bringing the web page monitored out of focus or portion of the browser window with the ad space outside of the monitor screen. When 60%, (or other pre-defined area) of the ad content on a web page is within the visible area of the viewer's browser window for one second, a message is sent via Correlator and a "Viewable Impression" is reported. The Correlator code continues to monitor the web page focus and scrolling position, location of ad unit(s) and the visible area of the browser window, and communicates to the reporting server logging the “Time in View” for the ads being delivered on the webpage.

== Implementation ==
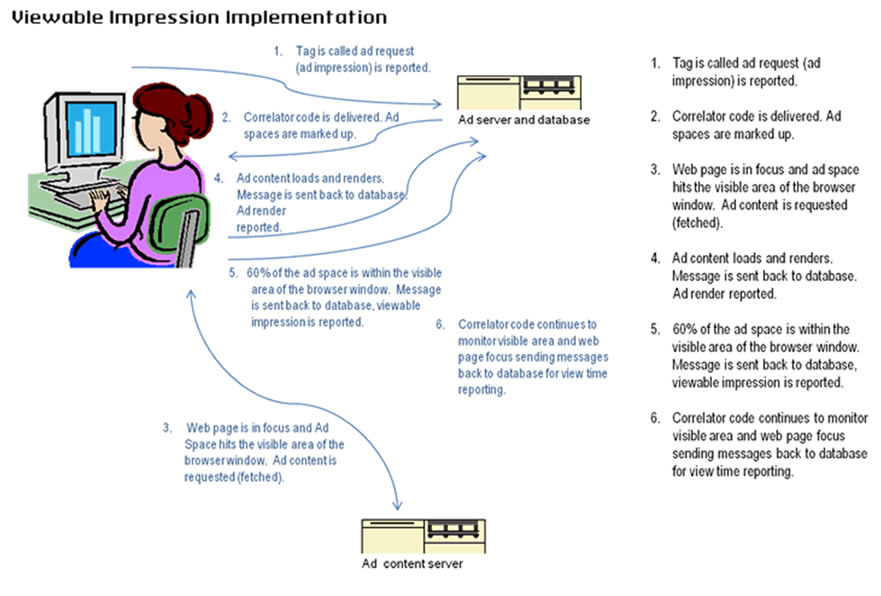
Viewable impression implementation

The complete viewer's environment is gathered by a client-side technology for every viewable impression reported and transmitted back to a server-side database. Data for each view includes the viewer's display resolution, the viewer's browser window dimensions, the dimensions of the web page the ad appeared on, the location of the ad on the page, and the scroll position at the time the viewable impression was recorded. This data results in a visual representation of the viewer's environment of each viewable impression reported, then the position of the ad is calculated, as is the area of the ad that is shown on the screen.

Also, the view time of the ad is collected by the client (viewer) side engine considering whether the web page the ad resides on is "In focus". “In-focus” is defined as when a Web page is the primary window open on a user's screen, unobstructed by any other application window. Web page focus can be affected by minimizing the browser, opening or switching to another browser window or application, opening or switching to another browser window tab, or placing the cursor on the browser address bar or other browser button).

== Limitations of impression methodology ==
Reasons why an impression may not appear to a viewer overcome:

- The viewer clicks to another web page before the ad loads and renders;
- The ad loads, but in an area of the web page that is not within the viewer's browser window dimensions and scrolling position;
- The requests made by spiders, crawlers, web-directories, download managers, link checkers, proxy servers, web filtering tools, harvesters, spambots or ; (This bad bots issue may be addressed in part already by a standard ad server following IAB guidelines but more study needs to be done to assess whether all non human technology is identified by the current approaches and whether viewable impression technology can improve on those measures. Current assessments suggests improvement with viewable impression methodology);
- The viewer has a particular type of ad blocker installed that could disrupt ad serving but still be initiate the count of an impression. (Some ad blockers block the ad call, some do not. More study should be done in this area);
- The viewer does not have the proper plug-in to render interactive media installed;
- The viewer opens a page in a mobile device that is not configured to show the ad content;
- The viewer minimizes the browser;
- The viewer opens another browser window or another application;
- The viewer opens another browser tab;
- The viewer switches focus to another browser or application;
- The viewer moves the browser window so the ad is outside the display screen area;
- The viewer has multiple home pages set so when the browser is opened, two pages open in two tabs, and an ad resides on the tab that is not in focus;
- In the case of pre-roll video and video advertising, if the viewer minimizes the browser, tabs away from, or opens another application over the video while the advertisement is playing or moves the browser window so the video is outside the display screen area;

Reasons why an impression may not appear to a viewer associated with fraud overcome:

- The request was made by an (invisible to the viewer) web page re-direct;
- The web publisher places multiple ad displays in layers over each other. The viewer then sees one ad, but impressions are reported for all layered ads;
- The web publisher places an image or shape on a layer overlapping an ad;
- An ad or beacon delivered in an invisible width="0" height="0" Iframe;
- Mutilated (http poisoning) packets Impression fraud.

Limitations related to data analysis and distribution flow with impression methodology overcome:

- Ad rotation visibility lottery. Not knowing which ads in rotation were in view for each ad selection means certain ads may never be visible making all the statistic data meaningless. (e.g. 3 Ads are in rotation). For rotation 1 the 1st is in view, 2nd is not, 3rd is in view. Rotation 2; 1st in view, 2nd not, 3rd is not, and in 3rd rotation the 2nd ad is again not in view. All ads are reported as impressions, reach, frequency and all other measurements, but ad 2 was never visible.
- Reach and Frequency measured for ads that are not visible. An ad that is not visible did not reach anyone, making reach and frequency measurements meaningless.
- Impressions that are not visible are included in click through rate, making click rate misleading.
- Display of complete branding messages and contact information is prohibitive; If a click-through is necessary to measure advertising, adding complete branding messages and contact information in a display ad is prohibitive because then a click through to a website is not necessary.
- All parties involved see different impressions reports that are impossible to reconcile.
- Reporting latency. Because server log files must be batched, filtered, and transferred to a database for reporting, significant delays exist before reporting data is available.
- No reported log or visual representation of each unique viewer's environment, including viewer's display resolution, and browser window area and scrolling position;
- No reported log or visual representation of each web page URL an ad is delivered to in addition to the web page dimensions and placement location of the ad on the web page.
- No data reported for the view time of each individual viewable impression.
- CPM value dilution because of an unlimited supply of inventory.
- Redundant ad delivery. (The delivery of the same ads on the same web page.)

== See also ==
- Click-through rate
- View-through rate
- Cost per action
- Cost per click
- Cost per mille
- Cost per thousand
- Direct-response marketing
- Internet marketing
- Pay per click
- Performance-based advertising
