= Pay per sale =

Pay-per-sale or PPS (sometimes referred to as cost-per-sale or CPS) is an online advertisement pricing system where the publisher or website owner is paid on the basis of the number of sales that are directly generated by an advertisement. It is a variant of the CPA (cost per action) model, where the advertiser pays the publisher and/or website owner in proportion to the number of actions committed by the readers or visitors to the website.

In many cases, it is impractical to track all the sales generated by an advertisement. However, it is more easily tracked for full online transactions such as selling songs directly on the internet. Unique identifiers, which can be stored in cookies or included in the URL, are used to track the movement of the prospective buyer to ensure that all such sales are attributed to the advertisement in question.

== Telephone Call Tracking Pay-per-Sale ==
Some companies handle transactions "offline," meaning sales driven by online traffic are closed via inbound telephone calls or in person rather than online. This model bridges the gap between online and offline platforms. In these cases, a cookie-based rotating system of telephone numbers can be used to accurately trace a phone call to the source online visitor. This way, a phone call that converts into business can be traced to the keyword search term that drove the phone call. As a result, bids on the source traffic can be appropriately adjusted and managed. Usually, it is the advertiser that determines what constitutes a valid lead or a qualified call to be paid.

== Pay-per-Sale Search Engine Marketing ==
Pay-per-Sale Search Engine Marketing is a variant of pay-per-sale, whereby the traffic source is largely search engine traffic, such as that from Google's AdWords "pay-per-click" system. The business model means that merchants no longer bear the cost of "pay-per-click"; instead, the "pay-per-sale" provider takes on the risk of conversion.

CPS belongs to the larger family of CPA, which is different from Cost Per Impression in which advertisers pay every time their advertisement is displayed, irrespective of whether the display created any action on the part of the reader or visitor to the website or not.

== Affiliate Networks in Online Marketing ==
Affiliate Networks usually offer the "pay-per-sale" business model and have done so since inception. These are firms that manage affiliates for their clients and often work with websites that accept advertisements. The industry has four core players: the merchant (also known as retailer or brand), the network, the publisher (also known as 'the affiliate'), and the customer. Typically, affiliate networks such as ValueClick or Commission Junction will connect merchants (advertisers) with publishers, or owners of sites, which can send traffic to the merchants' sites in exchange for a bounty, or commission for each sale delivered.

However, there is typically an upfront set-up fee, as well as monthly minimum charges for the advertiser, in addition to relatively stringent requirements around entry into the network to begin with. An individual or an organization could also set up his or its own affiliate network. This could address one of the risks of this model, which is less commitment on the part of the affiliates.

== See also ==
- Affiliate marketing
- CTR - Click-through rate
- CPC - Cost Per Click
- CPI - Cost Per Impression
- CPM - Cost Per Thousand
- eCPA - Effective Cost Per Action
- Internet marketing
- Revenue sharing - Cost derived from advertiser income
- VPA - Cost Per Action variation that transparently balances incentives between vendors and consumers
- Online advertising
