= Value Per Action =

Online marketing business model

Value Per Action (VPA) refers to an online marketing business model similar to the Cost Per Action (CPA) model. While Cost Per Action provides a low risk arrangement in which the seller only pays an advertising fee when a consumer takes action (such as purchasing their product) Value Per Action extends that model to add revenue sharing with the consumer.

Using the VPA model, sellers don't incur advertising/marketing costs until a sale takes place, and can increase the likelihood of a sale by increasing the advertising money. Because advertising money are shared between the marketer and the consumer, the amount of advertising money becomes a direct incentive to the consumer. Two sellers may offer the same product at the same price, but provide differing incentives to consumers through advertising money.

With the addition of transparent revenue sharing to the CPA model, VPA becomes a consumer-friendly approach in which the seller's advertising money provide a direct benefit to the consumer--effectively driving down the net price. Placed in a comparison shopping marketplace, the competition between sellers to provide better revenue provides additional downward pressure to the net price paid by consumers.

One example of VPA is Jellyfish.com.

== See also ==
- Internet marketing
- CTR - Click-through rate
- CPM - Cost Per Mille
- eCPM - Effective Cost Per Mille
- CPT - Cost per thousand
- CPI - Cost Per Impression
- PPC - Pay per click
- CPA - Cost Per Action
- CPC - Cost Per Click
- eCPA - effective Cost Per Action
- CPT
- Cost per conversion
