= Cost-per-engagement =

Cost-per-engagement (CPE) bidding, also referred to as engagement-based pricing, is an internet advertising model where advertisers only pay when users actively engage with ads. This can sometimes be conflated with cost per acquisition, but CPE only requires the user to engage with the ad and does not track to actual purchase of the service or product.

== Examples ==
In the Native Advertising/Content Marketing space advertisers can pay for content they promote on a cost-per-engagement (CPE) basis to ensure they drive quality audiences to pay attention to their content. inPowered first introduced CPE pricing for Native Content in 2014 when they enabled advertisers to pay only when the user clicks on an ad and spends more than 15 seconds reading their content or landing page.

Another example is when advertisers pay for lightbox ads (a type of expandable ad that can expand to a very large size) on a CPE basis, which means that publishers generate earnings from lightbox ads when users choose to engage with the ads, e.g., by hovering over them for two seconds to expand the ads.

In terms of Influencer marketing, where brands pay individual content creators to produce and post sponsored content, Cost Per Engagement is calculated as the total cost of the content (a social post for example) divided by the total number of likes, comments, shares, etc.

== See also ==
- Cost per click
- Cost per action
- Cost per impression
- Cost per mille
