= 123people =

yelster digital gmbh
- Company type: Private Company
- Founded: 2007
- Headquarters: Vienna, Austria
- Creators: Martin Stemeseder, Markus Wagner
- Services: People Search, people search engine and metasearch.
- Website: www.123people.com
- Launched: July 1, 2007; 19 years ago
- Current status: discontinued March 31, 2014; 12 years ago. Relaunched by OG Media US LLC

123people was an Austrian information collection agency which gathered information from the deep web and over 200 external data sources, presenting it in a searchable by name database. 123people only gathered publicly available information from an extensive list of international, as well as regional, sources. Later in its life, new services were added such as Webcleaner which was designed to delete web content (such as pictures, comments, or articles) from the Internet, and also the Social Network Monitor which checked the user's Facebook profile and attempted to prevent privacy and reputation threats. 123people stopped trading in 2014 and was defunct until purchased by OG Media US LLC out of Miami, Florida and relaunched as a celebrity news site.

== History ==
123people was a product of the 123people Internetservices GmbH. 123people Internetservices GmbH was founded in 2007 by European IT incubator i5invest with initial funding from Austrian venture capital company Gamma Capital Partners. The company was based in Vienna, Austria. Since March 2010, 123people was part of the French Solocal Group. At the beginning of 2012 the 123people Internetservices GmbH renamed itself into Yelster Digital GMBH.

This was also the starting point for the development of new activities by yelster digital: In January 2012 the company had announced the launch of 123pages in France, an online search service for businesses and services; in April 2012 123pages was launched in Austria. In January 2013, the company also gave a face lift and a product extension to the people search engine, 123people. Webcleaner and Social Network Monitor were the two new paid products that aimed to help web-users to monitor and protect their online reputation and personal safety.

The service was taken down permanently March 31, 2014. However, the URL was relaunched and is now a celebrity news aggregator website.

== Business model ==
123people had a multi-tier business model offering standard and customized banner campaigns in all of its 12 top-level domains, applying traditional CPC and CPM pricing models. Affiliate partnerships were also a main focus to 123people. 123people integrated over 200 local and international partners providing content such as directory services, premium public records and social networks, as well as products such as wish lists and books. Partners were integrated via teasers or text links within each of its sections. 123people's pricing models for partners included CPC, CPM and CPA.
