= View-through rate =

Metric for online advertising campaign

A view-through rate (VTR), measures the number of post-impression response or viewthrough from display media impressions viewed during and following an online advertising campaign. Such post-exposure behavior can be expressed in site visits, on-site events, conversions occurring at one or more Websites or potentially offline:

$$VTR=100*Viewthrough/Impressions$$
$$CTR=100*Clicks/Impressions$$

VTR is related to the popular click-through rate (CTR) measurement, but differs in that it is not an immediate measure of response - it is instead time-shifted and passive, i.e. no click is required.

Also, viewthroughs lack a specific predetermined landing page since the visit can come through a direct type-in or via another click-based digital marketing channel, e.g. search, email or social media.

TRR is the sum of both viewthrough and clickthrough response that resulted from the display media campaign.

$$TRR=(Viewthroughs + Clicks)/Impressions$$

The timeframe from ad exposure to subsequent response is often referred to as the lookback window or viewthrough timeframe. Typically, this is set by the ad server and could be 30 days to as much as 90 days.

The efficacy of this measurement is tied to cookie deletion rates and use of multiple computers. When success rate of important events like purchases (conversions) are tied to viewthrough visits this becomes the viewthrough conversion (V-CVR) rate, a hotly debated metric that can be gamed by performance-oriented ad networks.

$$V-CVR=Viewthrough Conversions/Viewthrough Visits$$

== Theory ==
=== The problem with clicks ===
Many websites are supported by banner advertising. Digital media, search engines, social networking sites and forums sell and deliver advertising to generate revenue. Measuring the response to display advertising includes immediate response (clicks) and latent response (viewthrough), which help determine whether the advertising was successful or not.

Historically, the digital advertising business has relied on the easy to measure click-through rate (CTR) typically provided by the ad server. Most ad server platforms also measure unique or reach impressions based on deduplication of browser cookies.

Click-through rates have been known to be on the decline since the advent of the display banner. It has become a popular means to determine the success of display media but often underestimates brand impact, suffers from significant biases and can often be manipulated through fraud. However, not all banner ad impressions realize a benefit. Some ad impressions are never seen, some are seen and clicked while others are seen and while never clicked realize a subsequent response - this post-exposure behavior is viewthrough.

A study done by online tracking and audience measurement firm Quantcast showed that there was no correlation between those who clicked on an ad and those who purchased down the line through a view-through conversion.

=== The problem with viewthrough ===
In measuring view-based conversions, there is room for manipulation. Because viewthrough conversions are tied to the setting the ad network's cookie and later matching it up via the same ad network's page tag loaded on a conversion page, less scrupulous ad networks have taken advantage of this by purchasing cheap below-the-fold ad inventory more for the purposes of dropping as many cookies as possible across as many users as possible than for showing the target audience advertiser's ads.

Such a strategy is called cookie-bombing and permits ad networks to potentially take credit for more conversion events than they should. When possible it is always recommended to use a standalone analytics package though many ad networks offer this functionality and to also leverage experimental design to measure true incrementality.

== See also ==
- Banner Ad - Display Banner Ad
- CPM - Cost Per Mille
- CPI - Cost Per Impression
- PPC - Pay per click
- CPA - Cost Per Action
- Cost per lead - Cost Per Lead
- Attribution (marketing) - Attribution
- Advertising network
- Click fraud
- Web analytics
- Advertising network
- Demand-side platform
- Digital display advertising
- Behavioral targeting
