= CyberThrill =

Online gambling company (1997–2001)

- Website type: Online casino
- Launched: 1997

CyberThrill was one of the first online casinos. It gained notoriety for being one of the largest organised international sponsorship and gambling frauds through its ad serving program. Formed in 1997 and located in Nassau, Bahamas, the company was represented by the Canadian firm Internet Entertainment Enterprises, Inc. (based in Montreal, Quebec, Canada) which also handled the casino's marketing and banner advertising program.

The online casino was eventually taken offline some time in late 2000-early 2001 by disgruntled webmasters who had fallen victim to the scam. The former location of cyberThrill was CyberThrill.com, which is today an Ad driven parked domain.

== History ==
=== 1997–2000: Ad program ===
As one of the foremost methods of website revenue in the late 1990s, website owners used to enroll in CyberThrill's ad serving program to display banners on their websites, similar to the contemporary AdSense program (by Google). CyberThrill ran the program to exclusively send gamblers to the casino website. The program itself was administered on a per-click basis.

The reason behind CyberThrill's popularity were claims of above-average $0.20 per click-through. Many webmasters joined the program and brought traffic to the online casino, but very few got paid. CyberThrill occasionally would send out a small, first check ($5 or $10) to 'show' legitimacy to the program. However, once the user's account reached in excess of $50 to $100, the casino would withhold payment or simply terminated the contract with the webmaster, on claims that CyberThrill's terms were breached.

Though click fraud was rampant (as has been the case with AdSense and other ad serving programs), many webmasters nonetheless earned their clicks fairly, but were still cheated by the casino.

=== 2000–2001: Demise ===
The online casino was eventually destroyed some time in late 2000-early 2001 in an attack by webmasters who were scammed by the program. MungaBunga, owner of Hackology.co, created a JavaScript program that registered millions of fake accounts into the CyberThrill database, overloaded the company's servers and prevented new members from registering. Other cheated webmasters participated in the attack.

== See also ==
- AdSense
