= Advertising revenue =

Income from displaying online ads

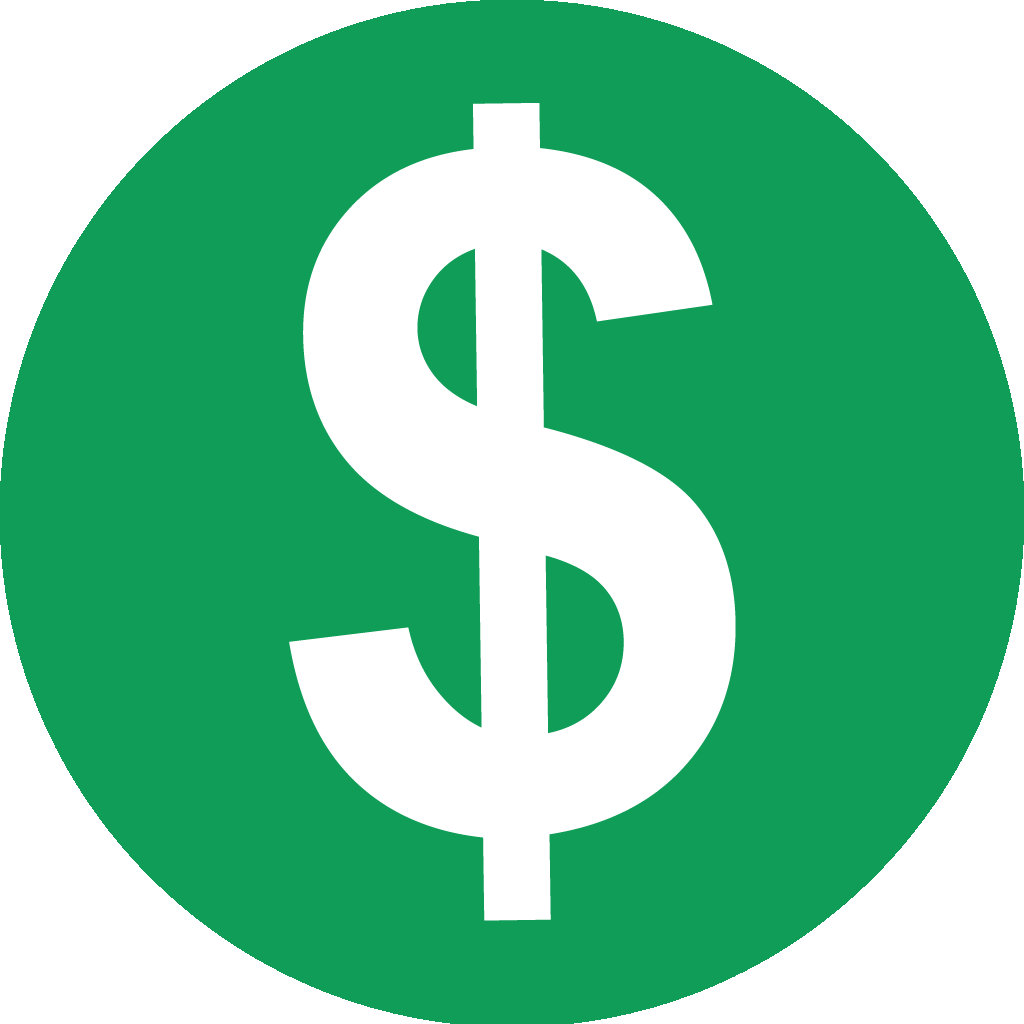
YouTube's monetization system (logo pictured) is one of the most prominent sources of advertising revenue online.

Advertising revenue is the monetary income that individuals and businesses earn from displaying paid advertisements on their websites, social media channels, or other platforms surrounding their internet-based content. In September 2018, the U.S. Internet advertising market was estimated to be worth $111 billion, with market share being held mostly between Google, Facebook, Amazon, and Microsoft. These companies earn revenue through online advertising but also have initiated pathways for individual users and social media influencers to earn an income. Individuals and businesses can earn advertising revenue through advertising networks such as Google AdSense, YouTube monetization, or Outbrain.

== Overview ==
There are a variety of methods and providers which individuals and online organizations can use in order to earn monetary income in the form of advertisements accompanying their website or digital media content. Digital technology giants such as Google, Facebook, YouTube, Amazon, and Microsoft allow website owners and content creators to engage in partnerships and display advertisements with their online media; these owners and creators can subsequently receive a share of the advertising revenue. Individuals and organizations can earn significant income through advertising revenue. In 2018, it was reported that major YouTube content creators such as Jake Paul and PewDiePie each earned more than $15 million through monetizing their online video content.

Revenue earned by individuals and organizations from online advertisement sources is considered taxable in multiple countries. In 2015, the Australian Taxation Office confirmed questions regarding the tax status of online Ad Revenue stating that it was taxable and content creators should be considered "performing artists". Also, in the United States, the Internal Revenue Service deems online ad revenue to be taxable. For those earning income from technology platforms controlled by Alphabet Inc., which includes Google and YouTube, a Form 1099 will be issued by the company if an individual or group earns more than $600 per year. The advertising industry is not without controversy. Ad blocking technology is problematic for companies and individuals looking to earn money by displaying advertisements alongside their content. Ad blocking software is reportedly used by 17% of people aged 18–34 and allows users to block advertisements while visiting a given website, thus removing the possibility that a user will click on a given advertisement.

== Notable platforms ==
=== Google ===
Google AdSense logo

Google is one of the largest online advertising platforms in the world. As of March 2019, Google is estimated to facilitate more than 90% of global searches. Since October 2015, Google and its online advertising branches have existed under the structure of an American multinational holding company, Alphabet Inc. Google co-founder Larry Page has stated that this move allows Google and other Alphabet Inc. subsidiaries to operate more independently and efficiently. The company's digital advertising revenue figures were approximated at around $39.92 billion U.S. in 2018. Google and Facebook are reported to control just under 60% of the U.S. online marketing space.

A significant part of Google's online advertising platform is Google AdSense, which allows websites to display Google-driven advertisements. As customers click on the advertisements, Google earns revenue from the advertising company, keeping 32% of the revenue while passing on 68% to the participating website. As of January 2018, online advertising accounted for 84% of Alphabet Inc.'s revenue. Google's advertising system provides significant revenue both for itself and for individuals and smaller companies who are actively participating as partners in Google's network.

=== YouTube ===
YouTube logo

Another online advertising giant owned by Alphabet Inc. is video sharing website YouTube. In 2006, Google bought YouTube for $1.65 billion. In 2015, Bloomberg estimated YouTube to be worth approximately $70 billion, with over 30 million average daily visitors. YouTube content creators who publish and share their own videos can monetize them. In certain cases, YouTube will pay creators a percentage of the advertising revenue for advertisements that are placed within and before or after videos. The approximate share of advertising revenue paid to the creators of monetized videos is reported to be 55%; in 2013, the average creator's income was estimated to be $7.60 per thousand views.

=== Facebook ===
Facebook logo

As of March 2018, Facebook and Google were estimated to hold a combined market share of just under 60% of the U.S. online marketing space. In the last quarter of 2018, Facebook reported an online advertising revenue of $16.9 billion. Facebook allows businesses to advertise throughout its website, using its in-depth knowledge of user demographics and interests to ensure that any given advertisement has a good chance of reaching its specific target audience. Facebook charges a fee for every advertisement click, known as cost per click. Facebook also allows businesses to increase the visibility of their advertisements beyond users who follow or like them; Facebook charges a fee based on the number of people a given advertisement reaches.

Facebook grants businesses and individual users the ability to earn money through advertising initiatives. For example, "Facebook Ad Breaks" allows users to earn revenue from advertisements that play during their own videos. The videos must be at least three minutes long, with the advertisement not showing until at least the end of the first minute. Early testing of this platform by some users indicates that not all viewers are watching the videos long enough to become monetized viewers; as such, the potential revenue has been deemed low.

In 2012, Facebook purchased the image-sharing application Instagram for $1 billion. At the time of purchase, Instagram had more than 30 million downloads. As of 2019, Instagram has over 1 billion monthly active users and is estimated to be worth more than $100 billion. Instagram allows individuals (known as influencers) and businesses to advertise images and video content to followers and potential customers. Instagram allows advertisers to redirect potential customers to external websites, where they can shop within online stores and download third-party content. Instagram influencers are paid several dollars for every thousand advertisement views. It is predicted that Instagram will earn more than $10 billion from this service annually as it moves through to the end of 2019. This revenue figure suggests Instagram comprises approximately 17% of the total online advertising revenue of its parent company, Facebook.

=== Amazon ===
Amazon logo

As of 2018, Amazon was reported to be the third largest online advertising platform and saw predicted advertising revenues sit at above $4 billion. With a reported 197 million unique online visitors per month, Amazon has a wide customer outreach similar to Google and Facebook. Amazon currently allows its users to pay to have their products made more visible on target customer's screens and also allows sellers to act as affiliates, being paid a referral commission of up to 15%. As of May 2019, Amazon is attempting to expand its affiliate advertising program by partnering with other large online media agencies and heavily trafficked websites. Amazon has reportedly reached out to online media giants BuzzFeed and The New York Times with an offer that would see them being paid in order to recommend or advertise products on their site. Such advertisements would include a link to the Amazon page where a potential customer could buy the product and in return, the media agencies would receive a percentage commission of the purchase.

On August 25, 2014, Amazon acquired Twitch Interactive for $970 million. On Twitch's live stream platform, advertisements are regularly played on Twitch live streams. Twitch streamers who grow their channels sufficiently can become Twitch Affiliates and Twitch Partners, thereby expanding their revenue avenues. Twitch Partners can earn a share of the revenue from advertisements played to their live audiences and are allowed to "determine the length and frequency of mid-roll advertisements."

=== Microsoft ===
Microsoft logo

In 2018, Microsoft represented approximately 4% of the estimated $111 billion of the U.S. online advertising market. Microsoft owns the search engine Bing, which constitutes over 6% of Internet searches, and the social media site LinkedIn. Microsoft earns advertising revenue through programs such as Bing Ads. Businesses and individuals can pay to have their advertisements displayed to customers on each platform. Bing's web publishers program allows website owners to earn advertising revenue by displaying Bing advertisements on their sites. Microsoft also earns ad revenue through its sites. LinkedIn allows individuals and businesses to pay in order to have image and video ads displayed to the demographics they wish to target. Each time a LinkedIn user clicks on one of these advertisements, the company is paid between $2–5. LinkedIn has more than 500 million users; in 2018, it was announced that LinkedIn expected to earn approximately $2 billion annually from ads on the platform.

== Issues ==
=== Tax implications ===
Revenue earned by individuals and organisations as a result of participating in online advertising programs such as Google AdSense and YouTube monetization may face different income tax requirements based on location. In 2015, the Australian Taxation Office outlined that anybody earning income from online advertising would be classed as a performing artist and be required to pay income tax. Under the Australian Taxation Office guidelines, performing artists include professionals such as singers, dancers, or anyone who relies on intellectual or entertainment-related skills. Specifically related to online advertising income, the Australian Taxation Office stated that any income that an individual receives from online advertising is a reward for providing services based on their activities as a special professional and therefore can form part of the taxpayer's assessable income. In the United States, the Internal Revenue Service also deems online advertising income to be taxable for individuals. For example, those in the United States earning ad revenue from technology platforms controlled by Alphabet Inc. will be issued a 1099 tax form directly by the company if the income is more than $600 per year.

=== Ad blocking ===
Adblock logo and wordmark

Ad blocking refers to the use of various computer applications or programs to remove all online advertisements. This technology can prevent content creators and website owners from earning revenue from those customers who use ad blocking software. One Wall Street Journal survey found that 17% of users aged 18–34 used ad blocking technology and thus prevented any "pay-per-click" advertising, as used by the major platforms, from being fully used. There has been support for ad blocking software from major technology companies such as Google. In 2018, Google announced that it would be launching ad blocking type software within its Chrome web browser aimed at targeting websites or advertisements that are designed to disrupt user experience and do not allow users to dismiss them before a certain time has elapsed. After Google notified potentially impacted websites of the changes, approximately 42% made preemptive changes to ensure that they were compliant with the new advertising user guidelines. Under the current protocol, any site that does not comply with Google's user guidelines will be contacted and given 30 days to resolve the advertising issues before further action is taken. Google has announced that its ad blocking technology will be available to users of their search engine without downloading third-party applications or installing any external software.

== See also ==
- Revenue sharing
- Performance-based advertising
- Affiliate marketing
