= AdTaily =

UK advertising network company

AdTaily.com
- Industry: Advertising network, Software
- Founded: London, UK (2009)
- Founder: Jakub Krzych, Marcin Ekiert
- Headquarters: 9 Devonshire Square, London, United Kingdom
- Products: adtaily.com, self-service advertising solutions
- Owner: Agora SA
- Website: www.adtaily.com

AdTaily is a self-service advertising network company based in London. The company's service allows online publishers to sell ads directly. Rather than using the popular pay per click or cost per mille method of charging advertisers for displaying ads on a website, AdTaily charges per day, per week, or per month.

== History ==
AdTaily started in September 2008, as an online project from Jakub Krzych and Marcin Ekiert which qualified for the London 2008 final of Saul Klein's funding competition Seedcamp. The beta release version of the AdTaily self-service ad system appeared online about half a year later. As AdTaily wanted to concentrate on the "Long Tail" of the Internet, the service was made available to only 250 bloggers, who were supposed to test the system on their blogs. For the next two months, the system was available on invitation-only, managing to reach 800 users, before it was publicly available. The company has continued to market the service in Poland since then.

In July 2009 the Polish media group Agora SA invested in AdTaily, and started using the AdTaily system across 80 per cent of its portfolio of websites.

At the beginning of 2010, Adtaily opened an office in London, and launched an international version of its service.

In July 2010, AdTaily was named one of "Europe's 25 Most Creative Companies" by CNBC Business magazine. CNBC said that AdTaily fulfilled the "democratising promise of the internet" for advertising, allowing the small advertisers in the "long tail" of advertising to be able to advertise in a way that is better understood than "buying 1,000 impressions that go away in a couple of minutes," which for them "can seem like a scam." According to CNBC, the AdTaily system is "simple and disruptively cheap to use."

By September 2010 16.000 publishers installed the AdTaily widget, generating one billion monthly impressions and 1,5 million clicks. There were 5200 paying customers and 30000 ad units sold monthly. By March 2011 it was among the top 50,000 in Alexa traffic rankings.

== Self-service advertising system ==
According to AdTaily, all of the people who visit a website are interested in its content, and some of them may also be interested in advertising their business or website to the like-minded audience.

The AdTaily self-service advertising widget allows advertisers to buy ads in as few as three clicks, without leaving the publisher's website. It uses the PayPal online payment service both for paying for the ad campaigns, and for charging to sell ads on a website). The service also use a single, 125x125px web banner format, so that advertisers can place the same ad on many websites in the same ad format.

Users need to create an account on the AdTaily website, after which they receive the widget code, which they have to paste into their website. The widget "auto-fits" to the section in which it is placed. The user has to know at least some basic HTML in order to know how and where to paste it. For ads sold directly through the publisher's website, the publisher keeps all of the revenue generated through the AdTaily widget Publishers can also moderate which ads appear on their website.

Some publishers are unsatisfied with the system, saying it does not attract enough advertisers, especially in the international version of the service, where the online store for advertisers (allowing the advertisers to place the same ads on multiple websites) has not been set up yet. There are also some doubts in how the system works exactly, and how to use it.
