= Google AdSense =

Advertising program by Google

- Developer: Google
- Release: June 18, 2003; 23 years ago
- Operating system: Cross-platform (web-based application)
- Type: Online advertising
- Website: adsense.google.com

Google AdSense is a program and advertising network run by Google through which website publishers in the Google Network of content sites serve text, images, video, or interactive media advertisements that are targeted to the site content and audience. These advertisements are administered, sorted, and maintained by Google. They can generate revenue on either a per-click or per-impression basis. Google beta-tested a cost-per-action service, but discontinued it in October 2008 in favor of a DoubleClick offering (also owned by Google). In Q1 2014, Google earned US$3.4 billion ($13.6 billion annualized), or 22% of total revenue, through Google AdSense. In 2021, more than 38 million websites used AdSense. It is a participant in the AdChoices program, so AdSense ads typically include the triangle-shaped AdChoices icon. This program also operates on HTTP cookies.

== Overview ==
Google uses its technology to serve advertisements based on website content, the user's geographical location, and other factors. Those wanting to advertise with Google's targeted advertisement system may enroll through Google Ads. AdSense has become one of the most popular programs specializing in creating and placing banner and responsive ads on websites and blogs. Responsive ads adjust themselves based upon user's device size. These advertisements are less intrusive and the content of the advertisements is often relevant to the website. Many websites use AdSense to make revenue from their web content (website, online videos, online audio content, etc.), and it is the most popular advertising network. AdSense has proved particularly useful for generating advertising revenue for small websites that do not have sufficient resources or other major sources of revenue. To display contextually relevant advertisements on a website, webmasters place a brief JavaScript code on the website's pages. Websites that are content-rich have been very successful with this advertising program, as noted in a number of publisher case studies on the AdSense website. Google has removed the policy of limiting AdSense ads to three ads per page. Now, AdSense publishers can place several AdSense ads on a page given there is sufficient content on a webpage. According to Google guidelines on ensuring proper ad placement, advertising and promotional material should not exceed page content.

Some webmasters put significant effort into maximizing their AdSense income. They do this mainly by following best practices:

1. They produce good quality content that attracts and engages users and provides a good user experience.
2. They follow webmaster guidelines.
3. They avoid flooding their website with advertisements.
4. They do not try methods that encourage users to click ads. Google prohibits webmasters from using phrases like "Click on my AdSense ads" to increase click rates. The phrases accepted are "Sponsored Links" and "Advertisements".
5. They do not link or redirect to websites with a poor reputation.

The source of all AdSense income is the Ads program, which in turn has a complex pricing model based on a Vickrey second price auction. AdSense requires an advertiser to submit a sealed bid (i.e., a bid not observable by competitors). Additionally, for any given click received, advertisers only pay one bid increment above the second-highest bid. Google currently shares 68% of revenue generated by AdSense with content network partners, and 51% of revenue generated by AdSense with AdSense for Search partners. On June 18, 2015, Google announced rebranding of AdSense with a new logo.

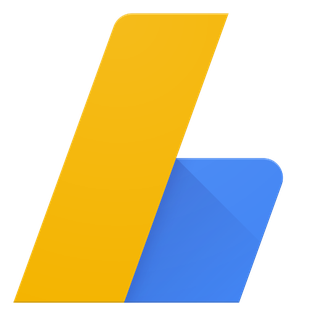
AdSense logo from 2015 to 2018

== History ==
Google launched its AdSense program, originally named "Content targeting advertising" in March 2003. The AdSense name was originally used by Applied Semantics, a competitive offering to AdSense. The name was adopted by Google after Google acquired Applied Semantics in April 2003. Some advertisers complained that AdSense yielded worse results than Google Ads, since it served ads that related contextually to the content on a web page and that content was less likely to be related to a user's commercial desires than search results. For example, someone browsing a blog dedicated to flowers was less likely to be interested in ordering flowers than someone searching for terms related to flowers. As a result, in 2004 Google allowed its advertisers to opt-out of the AdSense network.

Paul Buchheit, the founder of Gmail, had the idea to run ads within Google's e-mail service. But he and others say it was Susan Wojcicki, with the backing of Sergey Brin, who organized the team that adapted that idea into an enormously successful product. By early 2005 AdSense accounted for an estimated 15 percent of Google's total revenues. In 2009, Google AdSense announced that it would now be offering new features, including the ability to "enable multiple networks to display ads". In February 2010, Google AdSense started using search history in contextual matching to offer more relevant ads. On January 21, 2014, Google AdSense launched Direct Campaigns, a tool where publishers may directly sell ads. This feature was retired on February 10, 2015.

== Types ==
=== Content ===
The content-based advertisements can be targeted at users with certain interests or contexts. The targeting can be CPC (cost per click) or CPM (cost per thousand impressions) based, the only significant difference in CPC and CPM is that with CPC targeting, earnings are based on clicks while CPM earnings recently are actually based not just per views/impression but on a larger scale, per thousand impressions, therefore driving it from the market, which makes CPC ads more common.

There are various ad sizes available for content ads. The ads can be simple text, image, animated image, flash Video, video, or rich media ads. At most ad sizes, users can change whether to show both text and multimedia ads or just one of them. As of November 2012, a grey arrow appears beneath AdSense text ads for easier identification. Google made a policy update regarding the number of ads per page, the three ads per page limit has been removed.

Vignette ads appear when a person leaves a page rather than when a page first loads, so the person does not have to wait for it to load.

=== Search ===
AdSense for search allows publishers to display ads relating to search terms on their site and receive 51% of the revenue generated from those ads. AdSense custom search ads can be displayed either alongside the results from an AdSense Custom Search Engine or alongside internal search results through the use of Custom Search Ads. Custom Search Ads are only available to "white-listed" publishers. Although the revenue share from AdSense for Search (51%) is lower than from AdSense for Content (68%) higher returns can be achieved due to the potential for higher Click Through Rates.

=== Video ===
AdSense for video allows publishers with video content (e.g., video hosting websites) to generate revenue using ad placements from Google's extensive advertising network. The publisher is able to decide what type of ads are shown with their video inventory. Formats available include linear video ads (pre-roll or post-roll), overlay ads that display AdSense text and display ads over the video content, and the TrueView format. Publishers can also display companion ads - display ads that run alongside video content outside the player. AdSense for video is for publishers running video content within a player and not for YouTube publishers.

=== Link units ===
Link units are closely targeted to the interests of users. Because users directly interact with the ad unit, they may be more interested in the ads they eventually see.

AdSense publishers are paid for clicks on the ads that are linked from link unit topics, not for clicks on the initial topics themselves. The ads on the linked page are pay-per-click Google ads similar to those shown in regular AdSense ad units. Link Units

== Discontinued types ==
=== Mobile content ===
AdSense for mobile content allowed publishers to generate earnings from their mobile websites using targeted Google advertisements. Just like AdSense for content, Google matches advertisements to the content of a website — in this case, a mobile website. Instead of traditional JavaScript code, technologies such as Java and Objective-C are used. As of February 2012, AdSense for Mobile Content was rolled into the core AdSense for Content offering to better reflect the lessening separation between desktop and mobile content.

=== Domains ===
AdSense for domains allows advertisements to be placed on domain names that have not been developed. This offers domain name owners a way to monetize (make money from) domain names that are otherwise dormant or not in use. AdSense for domains is currently being offered to all AdSense publishers, but it wasn't always available to all. On December 12, 2008, TechCrunch reported that AdSense for Domains is available for all US publishers. On February 22, 2012, Google announced that it was shutting down its Hosted AdSense for Domains program.

=== Feeds ===
In May 2005, Google announced a limited-participation beta version of AdSense for Feeds, a version of AdSense that runs on RSS and Atom feeds that have more than 100 active subscribers. According to the Official Google Blog, "advertisers have their ads placed in the most appropriate feed articles; publishers are paid for their original content; readers see relevant advertising—and in the long run, more quality feeds to choose from." AdSense for Feeds works by inserting images into a feed. When the image is displayed by a RSS reader or Web browser, Google writes the advertising content into the image that it returns. The advertisement content is chosen based on the content of the feed surrounding the image. When the user clicks the image, he or she is redirected to the advertiser's website in the same way as regular AdSense advertisements. AdSense for Feeds remained in its beta state until August 15, 2008, when it became available to all AdSense users. On December 3, 2012, Google discontinued AdSense For Feeds program.

== How it works ==
- The webmaster who wishes to participate in AdSense inserts the AdSense JavaScript code into a webpage.
- Each time this page is visited by an end user (e.g., a person surfing the Internet), the JavaScript code uses inlined JSON to display content fetched from Google's servers.
- For contextual advertisements, Google's servers use a web cache of the page created by its Mediabot "crawler" to determine a set of high-value keywords. If keywords have been cached already, advertisements are served for those keywords based on the Ads bidding system.
- For website-targeted advertisements, the advertiser chooses the page(s) on which to display advertisements, and pays based on cost per mille (CPM), or the price advertisers choose to pay for every thousand advertisements displayed.
- For referrals, Google adds money to the advertiser's account when visitors either download the referred software or subscribe to the referred service. The referral program was retired in August 2008.
- Search advertisements are added to the list of results after the visitor/user performs a search.
- Because the JavaScript is sent to the Web browser when the page is requested, it is possible for other website owners to copy the JavaScript code into their own webpages. To protect against this type of fraud, AdSense publishers can specify the pages on which advertisements should be shown. AdSense then ignores clicks from pages other than those specified. (see Click fraud for more information).

== Reception ==
Some webmasters create websites tailored to lure searchers from Google and other engines onto their AdSense website to make money from clicks. Such websites often contain nothing but a large amount of interconnected, automated content (e.g., a directory with content from the Open Directory Project, or "scraper" websites relying on RSS feeds for content). Possibly the most popular form of such "AdSense farms" are splogs (spam blogs), which are poorly written content centered around known high-paying keywords. Many of these websites reuse content from other websites, such as Wikipedia, to attract visitors. These and related approaches are considered to be search engine spam and can be reported to Google. A Made for AdSense (MFA) website or webpage has little or no content, but is filled with advertisements so that users have no choice but to click on advertisements. Such pages were tolerated in the past, but due to complaints, Google now disables such accounts. There have also been reports of Trojan horses engineered to produce counterfeit Google advertisements that are formatted looking like legitimate ones. The Trojan uploads itself onto an unsuspecting user's computer through a webpage and then replaces the original advertisements with its own set of malicious advertisements.

In May 2014, Hagens Berman law firm filed a national class-action lawsuit against Google, claiming the company unlawfully denies payments to thousands of website owners and operators who place ads on their sites sold through Google AdWords.

There were numerous complaints in online discussion forums about a difference in treatment for publishers from China and India, namely that sites from those locations are required to be active for six months before being eligible for AdSense. Due to alleged concerns about click fraud, Google AdSense has been criticized by some search engine optimization firms as a large source of what Google calls "invalid clicks", in which one company clicks on a rival's search engine advertisements to drive up the other company's costs. The payment terms for webmasters have also been criticized. Google withholds payment until an account reaches US$100.

Google came under fire when the official Google AdSense Blog showcased the French video website Imineo.com. This website violated Google's AdSense Program Policies by displaying AdSense alongside sexually explicit material. Typically, websites displaying AdSense have been banned from showing such content. Using both AdSense and Google Ads may cause a website to pay Google a commission when the website advertises itself. In some cases, AdSense displays inappropriate or offensive ads. For example, in a news story about a terrorist attack in India, an advert was generated for a (presumably non-existent) educational qualification in terrorism. AdSense uses tracking cookies that are viewed by some users as a threat to privacy. AdSense terms of service require that sites using AdSense explain the use of these cookies in their privacy policy.

== See also ==
- Ad blocking
- Google Ads
- List of Google products
- Pay per play
- DoubleClick
- Native advertising
