= Impression (online media) =

When an online ad is seen

An impression (in the context of online advertising) is when an ad is fetched from its source, and is countable. Whether the ad is clicked is not taken into account. Each time an ad is fetched, it is counted as one impression.

Because of the possibility of click fraud, robotic activity is usually filtered and excluded, and a more technical definition is given for accounting purposed by the IAB, a standards and watchdog industry group: "Impression" is a measurement of responses from a Web server to a page request from the user browser, which is filtered from robotic activity and error codes, and is recorded at a point as close as possible to opportunity to see the page by the user.

== Purpose ==
Counting impressions is the method by which most Web advertising is accounted and paid for, and the cost is quoted in CPM (cost per thousand impressions) or CPI (cost per impression). (Contrast CPC, which is the cost per click and not impression-based).

== Construction ==
A movement is underway to move from the current standard of served impressions, to a new standard of viewable impressions. The Interactive Advertising Bureau (IAB), Association of National Advertisers (ANA), and the American Association of Advertising Agencies (4A's) have joined forces in an initiative called 3MS (Making Measurement Make Sense), with the purpose of better defining the value of display media.

- Served impressions are the current standard. They are recorded by ad servers, and are counted whether or not the ad itself is fully loaded and in a space viewable to the end-user.
- Viewable impressions are defined as those that are at least 50% visible to the user for at least one second.

== See also ==
- Cost per impression
- Cost per click (CPC)/Pay per click (PPC)
- Cost per order
- Cost per mille (CPM)
- Effective cost per mille (eCPM)
- Cost per action (CPA)
- Effective cost per action (eCPA)
- Click-through rate (CTR)
- Internet marketing
- Performance-based advertising
