= Unicast advertisement =

Type of online advertisement

A unicast advertisement (or unicast ad) is a form of online advertising in which an advertising message is delivered over the Internet as a short rich-media presentation resembling a television commercial. It is generally displayed in a separate browser window, most commonly as a pop-up, and may include video, animation, and sound.

The presentation can function as a hyperlink, allowing the viewer to visit the advertiser's website or obtain further information. In this way, the format combines television-style audiovisual branding with the features of interactive advertising. Implementations could also record impressions, viewing time, and click-through performance.

== Development ==
In 1998, Unicast Communications' AdController technology was reported to download content-rich advertisements in the background using otherwise unused bandwidth. The advertisements were stored in the browser cache and played between page views in a separate Java window, typically for 10 to 20 seconds.

Unicast introduced its "Superstitial" format in May 1999. Unlike an interstitial advertisement that appeared immediately, the format preloaded an advertisement after the main content of a page had finished downloading and opened it when the user navigated to another page. Contemporary coverage in The Washington Post described Unicast's advertisements as large-window multimedia presentations intended to incorporate sound and video while reducing delays through background loading.

== See also ==
- Display advertising
- Pop-under ad
- Video advertising
- Web banner
