= Microsite =

Type of website

A microsite is an individual web page or a small cluster of pages which are meant to function as a discrete entity (such as an iFrame) within an existing website or to complement an offline activity. The microsite's main landing page can have its own domain name or subdomain.

== Usage ==
Microsites are typically used in web design to add a specialized group of information, either editorial or commercial. Such sites may be linked in to a main site or not or taken completely off a site's server when the site is used for a temporary purpose. The main distinction of a microsite versus its parent site is its purpose and specific cohesiveness as compared to the microsite's broader overall parent website.

Microsites used for editorial purposes maybe a page or group of pages that, for example, might contain information about a holiday, an event or similar item which gives more detailed information than a site's general content area may provide. A community organization may have its main site with all the organization's basic information but creates a separate, temporary microsite to inform about a particular activity, event, or similar.

Often, microsites will be used for editorial purposes by a commercial business to add editorial value. For example, a retailer of party goods may create a microsite with editorial content about the history of Halloween or some other holiday or event. The commercial purpose of such editorial microsites, (beyond driving product sales), may include adding value to the site's visitors for branding purposes as well as providing editorial content and keywords allowing for greater chances of search engine inclusion. Normally, microsites do not contain web applications.

Microsites may be used for purely commercial purposes to create in-depth information about a particular product, service or as editorial support towards a specific product, such as describing a new technology. A car manufacturer, for example, may present a new hybrid vehicle and support the sales presentation with a microsite specific to explaining hybrid technology.

In a large corporation, the various business units may own their specific content in a microsite within the corporations main website.

With the prevalence of keyword contextual advertising, (more commonly referred to as pay per click or PPC), microsites may be created specifically to carry such contextual advertising. Or along a similar tactic, they're created in order to specifically carry topic-specific, keyword-rich content with the goal of having search engines rank them highly when search engine users seek such content topics.

A microsite, however, will most likely not lower PPC cost, because it will most likely not improve Quality Score. There are nine factors that go into Quality Score, one of them is the quality of the landing page (how relevant the content is, transparent it is, and the ease of navigation). This factor does not look at the entire website (which can be a common misconception on Quality Score), only the page chosen to land people on from their search query. Thus, it does not matter if the website covers a broad spectrum of items, or only one, it matters if that one page's content is specific to that person's search. And considering the other eight factors that go into Quality Score, the main website should typically result in better Quality Scores than a microsite.

== Criticism ==
Microsites have been criticized by security expert Rich Baldry who claimed they cause confusion, waste money, and can damage reputation.

When special-purpose domains for campaign microsites appear, it becomes [...] confusing. At best, people might ignore the microsite domain, keeping themselves safe but making the marketing dollars a waste. At worst, the protection and reputation offered by use of known domains is lost and people end up infected the next time they follow an unknown domain.

== See also ==
- Landing page
- Web presence
