= Performance-based advertising =

Advertising model

Performance marketing, also known as pay for performance advertising, is a form of advertising in which the purchaser pays only when there are measurable results. Its objective is to drive a specific action, and advertisers only pay when that action, such as an acquisition or sale, is completed.

Performance-based advertising is becoming more common with the spread of electronic media, notably the Internet, where it is possible to measure user actions resulting from advertisements. Performance marketing is different from brand marketing which focuses on awareness, consideration, and opinions among target consumers.

Performance marketing is an integral part of an overall marketing strategy, and its effectiveness can be influenced by other promotional methods such as branding, media advertising, guerrilla marketing, and more. To assess the overall effectiveness of marketing activities, marketers analyze these influences further using tools like Brand Lift or similar metrics.

== Pricing models ==
There are four common pricing models used in the online performance advertising market.

CPM (cost-per-mille, or cost-per-thousand) Pricing models charge advertisers for impressions, i.e. the number of times people view an advertisement. Display advertising is commonly sold on a CPM pricing model. The problem with CPM advertising is that advertisers are charged even if the target audience does not click on the advertisement.

CPC (cost-per-click) Advertising overcomes the problem of CPM by charging advertisers only when the consumer clicks on the advertisement. However, due to increased competition, search keywords have become very expensive. A 2007 Doubleclick Performics Search trends Report shows that there were nearly six times as many keywords with a cost per click (CPC) of more than $1 in January 2007 than the prior year. The cost per keyword increased by 33% and the cost per click rose by as much as 55%.

In recent times, there has been a rapid increase in online lead generation – banner and direct response advertising that works off a CPL pricing model. In a cost-per-lead pricing model, advertisers pay only for qualified leads – irrespective of the clicks or impressions that went into generating the lead. CPL advertising is also commonly referred to as online lead generation.

Cost per lead (CPL) pricing models are the most advertiser-friendly. In 2007, an IBM research study found that two-thirds of senior marketers expect 20 percent of ad revenue to move away from impression-based sales, in favor of action-based models, within three years. CPL models allow advertisers to pay only for qualified leads as opposed to clicks or impressions and are at the pinnacle of the online advertising ROI hierarchy.

In CPA advertising, or Cost Per Acquisition, advertisers pay for a specific action such as a credit card transaction (also called CPO, cost-per-order).

Advertisers need to be careful when choosing between CPL and CPA pricing models.

In CPL campaigns, advertisers pay for an interested lead – i.e. the contact information of a person interested in the advertiser's product or service. CPL campaigns are suitable for brand marketers and direct response marketers looking to engage consumers at multiple touch-points – by building a newsletter list, community site, reward program or member acquisition program.

In CPA campaigns, the advertiser typically pays for a completed sale involving a credit card transaction. CPA is all about 'now' – it focuses on driving consumers to buy at that exact moment. If a visitor to the website doesn't buy anything, there's no easy way to re-market to them.

There are other important differentiators:

1. CPL campaigns are advertiser-centric. The advertiser remains in control of their brand, selecting trusted and contextually relevant publishers to run their offers. On the other hand, CPA and affiliate marketing campaigns are publisher-centric. Advertisers cede control over where their brand will appear, as publishers browse offers and pick which to run on their websites. Advertisers generally do not know where their offer is running.
2. CPL campaigns are usually high volume and lightweight. In CPL campaigns, consumers submit only basic contact information. The transaction can be as simple as an email address. On the other hand, CPA campaigns are usually low-volume and complex. Typically, the consumer has to submit a credit card and other detailed information.

CPL advertising is more appropriate for advertisers looking to deploy acquisition campaigns by re-marketing to end consumers through e-newsletters, community sites, reward programs, loyalty programs, and other engagement vehicles.

== Metrics ==
Various types of measurable action may be used in charging for performance-based advertising:

- Many Internet sites charge for advertising on a “CPM” (cost per thousand) or cost per impression basis. That is, the advertiser pays only when a consumer sees their advertisement. Some would argue that this is not performance-based advertising since there is no measurement of the user response.
- Internet sites often also offer advertising on a "PPC" (pay per click) basis. Google's Google Ads product and equivalent products from Millennial Media, Yahoo!, Microsoft and others support PPC advertising plans.
- A small but growing number of sites are starting to offer plans on a "Pay per call" basis. The user can click a button to place a VoIP call, or to request a call from the advertiser. If the user requests a call, presumably they are highly likely to make a purchase.
- Finally, there is considerable research into methods of linking the user's actions to the eventual purchase: the ideal form of performance measurement.

Some Internet sites are markets, bringing together buyers and sellers. eBay is a prominent example of a market operating on an auction basis. Other market sites let the vendors set their price. In either model, the market mediates sales and takes a commission – a defined percentage of the sale value. The market is motivated to give a more prominent position to vendors who achieve high sales value. Markets may be seen as a form of performance-based advertising.

The use of mobile coupons also enables a whole new world of metrics within identifying campaign effect. Several providers of mobile coupon technology make it possible to provide unique coupons or barcodes to each person and at the same time identify the person downloading it. This makes it possible to follow these individuals during the whole process from downloading to when and where the coupons are redeemed.

== See also ==
- Advertising
- Google Ads
- Cost per action
- Digital marketing
- Pay per call advertising
- Pay per click
