= Quality Score =

Variable used by search engines to set the rank and cost of ads

Quality Score is a metric used by Google, Yahoo! (called Quality Index), Facebook (called Ad Quality) and Bing that influences the ad rank and cost per click (CPC) of ads.

To determine the position of the ad on a search engine, each ad is allocated using a process which takes into account the bid and the Quality Score. Ads are then listed in descending order based on the result of that equation. The exact weight of Quality Score versus bid has not been revealed by any of the major search engines, and each company has stated that they reserve the right to continually adjust their ranking methodologies.

Quality Score is also used to determine if a keyword is even eligible to enter the auction and show an ad. Keywords with low or poor Quality Score might not be eligible or ads might show rarely.

In late 2008, Google revealed that Quality Score was used to determine which ads it would show above organic results, and that a high-quality score could actually cause ads to jump over ads with lower quality scores that would otherwise not merit that prominent placement.

== Purpose ==
The major search engines have each independently implemented efforts to maintain and improve the quality of ads listed on their sites. The primary reason for this is to improve the experience of users who click on paid advertising links. It is reasonable to assume that users who have a great experience when clicking on ads will click on them more frequently, thus increasing advertising revenues for the search engine.

In addition, Google chose to introduce variable minimum bids at the same time as it introduced Quality-Based Bidding. On the surface, this new feature allowed advertisers to bid as little as $0.01 to have their ad shown. However, in some cases, advertisers found their minimum bids for some ads were raised to as high as $5.00 or $10.00. By implementing variable minimum bids, Google created a mechanism whereby the company could set different minimums for different advertisers for the same keyword, and potentially increase the average minimum bid without the advertising community as a whole being made aware. Furthermore, by raising minimums bids, Google could test each advertiser's ability to pay these increases, thus increasing competitiveness within the auctions and extracting maximum revenue from each advertiser.

== Factors in determining Quality Score ==
There are a number of factors that determine the Quality Score of a given ad. While each search engine has released directional information on the factors most important to them, presumably in an effort to guide their advertisers towards making better ads, none has revealed their formulas in detail. Below is a summary of what has been released:

=== Click-through rate ===
All three search engines have revealed that a major factor - the most important factor to Google - in their respective Quality Score formulas is the historical click-through rate (CTR) of the keyword and matched ad. In fact, prior to its introduction of Quality Score in July 2005, Google determined ad rank by running the following formula against each ad and sorting them in descending order: bid * CTR.

In addition to the CTR of the keyword and matched ad itself, Google takes into account the overall historic CTR of the entire AdWords account as well as the historic CTR of the display URLs in the ad group.

=== Ad copy relevance ===
All three search engines have revealed that the relevance of the ad copy to the keyword is a factor in determining Quality Score. Therefore, it can be assumed that ads with ad copy that contains the keyword will have a higher Quality Score than ads with ad copy that does not contain the keyword.

=== Landing page quality ===
All three search engines have revealed that landing page quality is a factor in determining Quality Score. Landing page quality generally refers to whether or not the page contains relevant and original content and the navigability of the site. In the case of Bing Ads, they have revealed that ads with landing pages that don't contain the keyword may be declined altogether.

=== Landing page load time ===
In June 2008 Google revealed that landing page load time impacts Quality Score.

=== Geographical considerations ===
Google has revealed that the account's performance in the geographical region where the ad will be shown impacts Quality Score.

=== Other factors ===
All three search engines have revealed that other factors are taken into consideration when calculating Quality Score. In particular, changes in terms of use in Google Analytics have fed speculation in the search engine marketing (SEM) community that Google is using on-site conversion data in its Quality Score formula.

== Quality score factors for Google Ads ==
Below is the most recent update of factors that go into your Quality Score on Google. The biggest change since the previous update has to do with how well you target the different types of devices that can be used for doing the search.

Past clickthrough rate (CTR) for certain keywords

How often a specific keyword led to clicks on a specific advert.

A display URL's past CTR

How often a specific display URL received clicks.

Account history

The overall CTR of all the ads and keywords for an account.

The quality of a landing page

How relevant, transparent, and easy-to-navigate a page is.

Keyword/ad relevance

How relevant a keyword is to the advert.

Keyword/search relevance

How relevant a keyword is to what a customer searches for.

Geographic performance

How successful your account has been in specific regions.

An advert's performance on a site

How effective an advert has been on this and similar sites in the Display Network

Targeted devices

How effective adverts have been on different types of devices, e.g. desktops/laptops, mobile devices, and tablets

== Improve Quality Score ==
A high-quality score can help you get a better ad position at a lower cost per click (CPC). Therefore, it is important to increase your quality score. Ad relevance is the first step for Google to evaluate your quality score. Match the wording of your ad to be more directly related to the users’ searching word if your status is “Average” or “Below average”. The second step is to make sure users click on your ads, which is a signal to Google that your ads are relevant to the search. Moreover, update your landing page keeping the landing page relevant and consistent with the ad. Google includes performance across devices so optimizing your ads and landing pages for mobile will boost your score overall. You can try to discover new, highly relevant keywords to add to your campaigns that can contribute to the bulk of your overall traffic. In order to achieve the highest quality score possible of 10/10, all those areas must be better than your competitors, particularly click-through rate (CTR).

== Recent Updates ==
On May 15, 2017, Google announced improved reporting structure for quality score to gain deeper insight about keywords historical performance. According to Google, "To save you time and help you make more informed decisions, we’re adding three new optional status columns to the Keywords tab for Exp. CTR, Ad Relevance and Landing Page Experience. Simply add these columns to your keyword reports to get a comprehensive snapshot of your keywords’ current scores." So now an advertiser can get a historical performance snapshot of keywords to understand how they’ve changed over time.

== See also ==
- Google (Google AdWords)
- Bing (Bing Ads)
- Yahoo! (Yahoo! Search Marketing)

=== Related concepts ===
- Ad serving
- Click-through rate
- Pay per click
- Pay for placement
