= Jellyfish.com =

Reverse auction website

- Industry: Comparison shopping website, reverse auction
- Founded: 2006; 20 years ago, Middleton, Wisconsin, United States
- Founder: Brian Wiegand and Mark McGuire
- Headquarters: Middleton, Wisconsin, United States

Jellyfish.com was a reverse auction online shopping website. The Middleton, Wisconsin-based company was acquired by Microsoft in 2007. On May 22, 2008, Microsoft added the cash back service as part of their Live Search group of tools. The site was shut down at midnight, February 16, 2009.

== History ==
Jellyfish launched the first beta version of service in June 2006, after receiving an initial seed round of investment from its founders, Brian Wiegand and Mark McGuire, and Kegonsa Capital Partners.

In a press release, Kegonsa Capital Partners said that it acquired 25 percent of Jellyfish.com's stock for about $600,000 in February 2006, and made 15 times its seed investment with the deal.

In October 2006, Jellyfish raised an additional 5 million dollars in funding. According to their founders, Jellyfish has 1,000 retailers advertising more than 5 million products, from shoes to electronics to home appliances. It was expected to have 20 employees by the end of October 2006, at the Old Sauk Trails business park, on the Far West Side.

Kegonsa, a Fitchburg, Wisconsin group with 42 Wisconsin investors, led the second round of investment in October 2006, with more than $1 million in October 2006 through the Kegonsa Co-Invest fund, for a total of $5 million. The second round investors more than doubled their investment in less than a year.

In an interview in July 2007, Wiegand said Jellyfish had sold nearly $5 million worth of products, "everything from bicycles to shoes".

McGuire explained that the name Jellyfish was chosen because they wanted to be completely transparent.

=== Microsoft purchase ===
In 2007, Microsoft purchased Jellyfish. for an estimated price of $50 million (~$71.3 million in 2024). The Jellyfish engine can be used as a part of Microsoft Live Search. When bought by Microsoft, it had 26 employees.

== Live Search Cashback ==
Live Search Cashback allow users to search for products from multiple vendors and find their prices. It offers money back for purchases made through the site. This service started in June 2006 as part of Jellyfish.com and is integrated with Live Search in May 2008. Users now require to use Windows Live ID to sign into their Cashback accounts instead of the previous Jellyfish.com account. Microsoft plans on using this to catch up to Google in the search market.

== See also ==
- List of companies acquired by Microsoft Corporation
- CPA (cost-per-action)
- CPC (cost-per-click)
