= Mojiva =

Mojiva, Inc.
- Type: Private
- Industry: Mobile advertising
- Founded: New York City, New York, United States (May 2008)
- Founder: Miles Spencer; Dan Goikhman; Krish Arvapally
- Headquarters: New York City, New York, United States
- Number of locations: 4 in the United States; 1 in the United Kingdom
- Area served: Worldwide
- Key people: Miles Spencer (Chairman); Dan Goikhman (VP, Strategic Alliances); David Gwozdz (CEO); Krish Arvapally (CTO)
- Website: www.mojiva.com

Mojiva was a mobile advertising network for smartphones and tablet devices. The company was known for introducing an ad network tailored specifically for tablets, known as Mojiva Tab. It rebranded to "mOcean Mobile" before being acquired by Pubmatic. Mojiva raised a total of $42.3 million in venture funding before being bought.

== History ==
Mojiva launched in May 2008. The company was founded by Krish Arvapally, Dan Goikhman, and Miles Spencer. Dave Gwozdz, also a founding member of the ad network DoubleClick, was Mojiva's CEO from Aug 2008 - Dec 2013. In 2011, Mojiva created the “Mobile Creative Alliance”, a loose partnership of media companies that held nationwide presentations to spread the word about mobile advertising. Mojiva's company headquarters are in New York City. Branch offices are located in San Francisco, Los Angeles, Seattle, Detroit, Chicago and London. The company claims to represent 8,000 digital publishers and app developers. Mojiva Tab was anticipated to reach 40 million tablet devices. As of late 2012, Mojiva had raised a total of $42.3 million in funding from a variety of sources. A funding round in July 2011 raised $25 million, while another round in late 2012 raised an additional $7 million.

Mojiva's ad network served both banner advertisements and interstitial (full screen). Analysts expect healthy growth of the mobile ad marketplace, with rich media mobile advertising to rise by 365% between 2012 and 2016.

Mojiva was renamed Mocean Mobile in January 2014. Mocean Mobile was acquired by Pubmatic in May 2014.

== Recognition ==
Prior to the 2012 US presidential election, Mojiva conducted an informal study of smartphone users' political orientations. The results of the study were made public on Mashable as an infographic. In another study published on Mashable, Mojiva learned the smartphone users were more likely to text than phone family and friends on New Year's Eve.
