= Semiconductor International =

- Type: business magazine
- Format: Paper and online magazine
- Owner: Reed Business Information
- Editor: Pete Singer
- Founded: 1978
- Ceased publication: April 30, 2010
- Language: English
- Headquarters: Des Plaines, Illinois, USA
- Circulation: 42,500
- ISSN: 0163-3767
- Website: Semiconductor International

Semiconductor International (ISSN 0163-3767) was a trade publication and web site owned by Reed Business Information serving the information needs of manufacturers of semiconductors and integrated circuits.

The editor-in-chief was Pete Singer.

Established in 1978, Semiconductor International was published monthly. Regular news and feature articles covered topics including Wafer Processing, Lithography, Yield Management, Metrology, Semiconductor Packaging and Wafer Cleaning.

Semiconductor International broadcast technology webcasts each month coinciding with the print cover story for that month. In December, they broadcast an additional industry forecast webcast. Other webcasts were added to the lineup as the need arises.

As of December 2006, total BPA audited circulation was 42,500 subscribers. The issue published on April 30, 2010 was the last issue of the magazine.
