= CNNfn =

Defunct cable network covering financial markets and business news

- Country: United States

Ownership
- Owner: Turner Broadcasting System

History
- Launched: December 29, 1995; 30 years ago
- Closed: December 15, 2004; 21 years ago
- Replaced by: CNN International (limited markets)

CNNfn (with "fn" an initialism for "financial network") was an American cable television news network operated by the CNN subsidiary of the media conglomerate Time Warner from December 29, 1995, and of AOL Time Warner until December 15, 2004. The network was dedicated to covering financial information and business news, similar to CNBC, TechTV and Bloomberg Television.

It was available in a number of markets, including the U.S. and Australia. In Canada, much of its content was aired on ROB TV (now BNN).

After years of struggling to attract an audience, Time Warner folded CNNfn in late 2004. On some U.S. cable television systems, its slot was given to CNN International on a full-time basis; previously, CNN International filled CNNfn's schedule in late nights and weekends. However, many cable companies ended their carriage of the channel and did not take CNN International, though it is available through the CNN website and mobile app with TV Everywhere credentials.

CNN continues to maintain a business news vertical on digital platforms, now known as CNN Business. The vertical was originally CNNMoney—a partnership with the Time Warner-owned financial magazines Fortune and Money. The partnership was folded after Time Warner spun out its publishing assets (and subsequently sale to Meredith Corporation, and later, to IAC's Dotdash).

== Network history ==
In 1995, Lou Dobbs and Ted Turner were having heated internal discussions about the direction of CNN. Dobbs was able to convince Turner that letting him start a new channel would be a way to solve both issues. Turner would keep Dobbs working for CNN while giving him his own network to run.

In July 1999, Dobbs quit CNNfn and started his own company, Space.com, and eventually returned to CNN to host Lou Dobbs Tonight.

From the start, CNNfn struggled to be picked up by local and national cable operators. In 2004, the official CNNfn network was shut down due to declining revenue and limited carriage; moreover, it hadn't renewed its agreement with DirecTV, which would have reduced its coverage further. The money used for CNNfn was used to change HLN's format. However the technologies invented in the early CNNfn days helped launch CNN and the entire broadcasting industry into a new digital era. The CNNfn.com website continued on, and in 2001 merged with Money Magazine to form CNNMoney.

== Schedule ==
The schedule below is taken from the now-defunct site of CNNfn as at 2001 (only from Monday to 12 am on Friday). All the times ET.

=== Weekdays ===
- 6 am - CNNmoney morning
- 8 am - Before Hours
- 9:29 am - Market Call
- 11:50 am - The Biz
- 12:30 pm - The Money Gang
- 3pm - Street Sweep
- 5pm - The N.E.W. Show
- 6pm - Moneyline
- 7pm - Business Unusual
- 7:30pm - The Biz
- 8pm - The N.E.W Show (re-broadcast)
- 9pm - Moneyline (re-broadcast)
- 10pm - The Biz (30-minute edited edition, re-broadcast)
- 10:30pm - Weekend Show rotation
- 11pm - Moneyline (re-broadcast)
- 12am - Business Unusual (re-broadcast)
- 12:30am - World Business This Morning (Live from London)
- 1am - Weekend Show rotation
- 1:30am - World Business This Morning (Live from London)
- 2am - Moneyline (re-broadcast)
- 2:30am - World Business This Morning (Live from London)
- 3am and 3:30am - The Biz (re-broadcast)
- 4am - The N.E.W. Show (re-broadcast)
- 5am - Moneyline (re-broadcast)

== Technological advances ==
CNNfn inaugurated many innovations on TV and online. Many of these helped the Internet and broadcasting industry become what they are today. Just a few of these accomplishments include:

- The first fully digital studio in the world. From the digital cameras to the production room and beyond, the CNNfn network was the first fully digital professional broadcasting studio. Unlike all other studios at the time, CNNfn could control all cameras with a single joystick. CNNfn claimed the joystick operator was a computer-trained worker, not a camera operator. To make this happen, CNNfn worked closely with Avid Systems in creating some of their own first generation broadcasting solutions. Additionally CNNfn and Avid Systems worked with Apple Computer to create a hacked version of the Mac operating system as no other system at that time could handle the throughput requirements of real-time digital video editing. Due to these advancements, CNNfn had many issues with labor unions. The unions claimed that the joystick operator should be worth four times as much as a normal camera operator and thus unionized workers should be paid accordingly.
- The first online stock quote engine. CNNfn worked with S&P Comstock and Townsend to convert what was then a special direct connection to the stock market into a real-time data feed that could be used by the CNNfn.com website. Prior to this, ticker symbol lookups were typically reserved for private firms and not generally available.
- The first automated on-air stock ticker. Although other broadcasters were showing a moving ticker, the data from these were edited and keyed in manually. Therefore, the lag time in the data being displayed to a view was unpredictable. CNNfn was the first to automatically tap into the ticker feed and create an engine that would "auto-select" hot stocks and otherwise prioritize the display to show the most relevant stocks.
- The first with advertising campaign management. The online advertising market was just being invented while CNNfn's website was being launched. Prior to CNNfn, the online advertising market primarily used weighting for ad rotations. This would provide a specific advertiser a percentage of views for each page the ad was displayed. CNNfn worked with industry leader NetGravity to develop the first policy engine that would allow CNNfn.com to target advertisements based on user demographics.
- The first to utilize streaming media with broadcast video. At the time, RealNetworks, VDONet, and VXtreme were startups in the streaming media space. No broadcaster saw the Internet as a viable way to reach their audience and they all believed their content to be too valuable to broadcast over the Internet for free. In late 1996, CNNfn.com published 1–2 hours of its programming each day within minutes after the actual show had aired on TV.
- The first to utilize Layer 7 load balancing to scale. At the time, round-robin DNS with weighted nodes to account for servers with more or less power or connectivity was the only way to scale a web farm. CNNfn was working closely with Netscape by also helping the write portions of their software which was incorporated into their 2.x product line. Round robin was not fast enough at taking a server out of rotation when Netscape would crash. Thus CNNfn worked with a few vendors to implement a Layer 7 solution that would instantly know when a server was up or down. This dramatically increased the speed and quality of the CNNfn and CNN websites.
- The first to fully automate publishing. By working with Lotus Development, CNNfn was the first to use a database back-end system to automate the work flow of a publishing system. At that time, even The Wall Street Journal, another startup, used web masters to hand convert articles from the editors into HTML and to get them approved by hand through e-mail or visual confirmation from a manager. The web master would then post the story onto the website and edit the referring page to add a link to the new document. CNNfn worked with Lotus's Domino product to fully automate the draft, approval, and publishing of its articles. The website was completely automated in re-writing its static home page with the latest stories. As an industry first, this method was published in a few major magazines and studies by others. Within months after its initial deployment, CNN revamped its own website's publishing methods and reduced its webmasters from 15 to 3.

In the summer of 1996 the top two technology members of Lou Dobb's team, Sam Edge and Nils Lahr, threatened to quit CNNfn if changes were not made to allow them more creative control in implementing new technologies. Additionally, they wanted some level of credit and increased internal recognition through proposed promotions. Dobbs tried to keep these key members of the team at CNNfn by offering them higher wages and even went as far as to suggest that he would create an entire company dedicated to high-technology research in connection with Gartner such that the advancements that were made would become knowledge that could be sold to others. However Dobbs was unable to make this happen quickly inside of CNN as there was resistance from Turner and others. In late 1996, Edge moved to CNN in Atlanta, Georgia, and Lahr left to join the startup VXtreme (which was later purchased by Microsoft and became what is now the Windows Media). Dobbs made a last-ditch attempt to keep Nils inside CNN by attempting to sue him, claiming there were "important" and "unfinished" duties that required his attention at CNNfn. The lawsuit, however, was thrown out and Lahr was allowed to leave. Shortly after, Dobbs quit CNNfn and, as promised, started his own company, Space.com.

== See also ==
- CNN
- CNN/SI
