= BPA Worldwide =

American auditing company

BPA Worldwide is a United States–based not-for-profit media auditing company that provides independent, third-party audits of media including print, digital, out-of-home and events.

In early 2023, BPA merged with the Alliance for Audited Media (AAM), to create the largest not-for-profit media auditing organization.

AAM independently verifies print and digital circulation, website analytics, social media, technology platforms, and audience information for newspapers, magazines and digital media companies in the U.S. and Canada. In the digital advertising space, AAM is a provider of technology certification audits to industry standards established by the Interactive Advertising Bureau, Media Rating Council, Trustworthy Accountability Group (TAG), and the Mobile Marketing Association.

== History ==
=== 20th century ===
In 1931, Controlled Circulation Audit Inc. (CCA) opened in New York City.

In 1954, the CCA changed its name to BPA, which at the time stood for Business Publications Audit of Circulation, Inc. In the same year that they opened their first satellite office in Chicago, Illinois. In 1970, BPA completed its first audit of a European title, Vision.

In 1980, the first audit of pass-along individuals was conducted for Architectural Record. This report used surveys to qualified subscribers to determine how many additional individuals also read their copy of the publication.

In 1985, BPA opened their West Coast office in Los Angeles.

In 1995, BPA was changed to BPA International with the addition of their first overseas office in London. In 1998, the Canadian Circulations Audit Board (CCAB) merged with BPA International. With the addition of their audited titles, total media owner membership exceeded 2,500 members and 500 employees.

=== 21st century ===
In 2004, BPA International changed its name to BPA Worldwide. This coincided with the opening of an office in Beijing, China. In 2006, BPA opened an office in Dubai Media City.

BPA launched its Brand Report product in 2008. The statement reports all of a media owner's audience "touch points" on a single statement.

In 2012, BPA opened a branch office in Shenzhen, China. BPA opened another office in Hong Kong in March 2001.

The BPA Media Exchange was launched in 2017. Publishers and advertisers may transact through the Media Exchange via both direct and indirect sales activation.

In July 2022, Richard Murphy was named President and Chief Executive Officer of BPA Worldwide. Murphy replaced Glenn Hansen, who announced his intent to retire in June 2023. In the interim, Hansen was named Executive Strategic Advisor to focus on BPA iCompli Sustainability and Event Audit practices.

In March 2023, BPA Worldwide and the Alliance for Audited Media completed a merger to become the largest not-for-profit media auditing organization.
