= Run of network =

Form of internet marketing

Run of network advertising is a form of internet marketing where an online advertising campaign is applied to a wide collection of websites without the ability to choose specific sites.

An advertising network sells space for online ads to appear on a number of different websites, blogs and similar channels. A network may focus on a particular type of website such as games or entertainment, or represent several different categories. A run of network campaign is one in which the advertiser cannot choose to target specific parts of the network. Having a run of network option should result in lower prices than choosing sites specifically as the network can run on more sites and take advantage of extra inventory that might not be in as high demand.

== Effectiveness ==
The run of network campaign is a high-reach, low cost strategy but studies have shown it to be less effective than more targeted campaigns. A good network should optimize run of network traffic so they are not showing ads to the wrong people.
