= Opportunity to see =

Opportunity to see (OTS) is a term which refers to an advertising campaign and the number of exposures or opportunities which a particular audience has to see a specific advert. In the context of radio advertising, the applicable relevant term is opportunity to hear (OTH).

For example, OTS coverage of 40% means that 40% of the target audience saw (or is expected to have a chance to see) the advertisement.

OTS has been a traditional metric determining advertising value, though in the Internet era it is also supplemented by the pay-per-click metric.
