= Ad rotation =

Showing multiple ads in one place on a web page

Ad rotation is the practice of showing multiple advertisements in a single location on a web page. Ads may be rotated with each new page load, within a single page load, or both. Because the ads are placed in the same location, they are typically the same format.

== Goals ==
Goals of ad rotation include:

- Allow publishing sites to serve ads for multiple advertisers.
- Keep advertising "fresh". If the ad never changes, users are more likely to ignore it.
- For content-rich sites, increase exposure to advertising by showing multiple ads per page load instead of just one.

== Software ==
Ad rotation software, known as ad rotators, commonly provide features such as the following:

- image management
- display weighting to control the frequency and duration of individual ads
- reporting, allowing advertisers to see how often ads were displayed and clicked
- for service-based ad rotation, management features such as color selection, filtering competitor ads, channel selection (content, video, search, etc.) and payment management

== Technical implementation ==
Technically, ad rotation can be accomplished in multiple ways. The three most common approaches are server-side, client-side and service-based.

With server-side ad rotation, the ad is selected on the server and the corresponding HTML markup is generated and then served.

Client-side ad rotation typically involves JavaScript of some sort (either straight client-side JavaScript or else AJAX calls to the server.

Service-based ad rotation is similar to client-side ad rotation in that it typically involves placing a small amount of JavaScript in the web page, but the JavaScript calls against a third-party service that provides its own management interface for specifying ad delivery options. Google's AdSense service is an example of service-based ad rotation.

== Types of rotating ads ==
Ad rotation is most often used with digital display advertising. These ads are shown in a variety of web sizes with the most common being a medium rectangle (300px x 250px) and a leaderboard (728px x 90px). They can be static display ads, live banners, video ads or interactive ads.

== Common problems ==
Ad rotation can enable publishers to inflate ad impressions by rotating many ads on top of one another so that only the top ad is viewable yet advertisers are charged for the non-viewable ads. As an example, the ad rotator can load a static placeholder banner visible to the user but then make ad calls for other non-viewable banners ads in the background. Ad calls are requests for the ad that result in impressions when the ad is loaded. This strategy is against the TOU for Google's AdSense ad rotation program.

== See also ==
- Web banner
- Ad serving
- Ad fraud
- Web Tracking
