= Cost per order =

Cost per order (cost per purchase), is the cost of internet advertising divided by the number of orders. Cost per order, along with cost per impression and cost per click, is the starting point for assessing marketing effectiveness and can be used for comparison across advertising media and vehicles and as an indicator of the value of a firm's internet marketing.

== Purpose ==
The "cost per order" metric measures the advertising cost required to acquire an order. If the main purpose of the ad is to generate sales, cost per order is the preferred metric.

== Construction ==
This is the advertising cost to generate an order. The precise form depends on the industry and is complicated by product returns and multiple sales channels. The basic formula is:

Cost per order ($) = Advertising cost ($) / Orders placed (#)
