= Click-through rate =

Percentage of views on a certain web page that made a desired click

Click-through rate (CTR) is the ratio of clicks on a specific link to the number of times a page, email, or advertisement is shown. It is commonly used to measure the success of an online advertising campaign for a particular website, as well as the effectiveness of email campaigns.

Click-through rates for ad campaigns vary tremendously. The first online display ad, shown for AT&T on the website HotWired in 1994, had a 44% click-through rate. With time, the overall rate of users' clicks on webpage banner ads has decreased.

== Purpose ==
The purpose of click-through rates is to measure the ratio of clicks to impressions of an online ad or email marketing campaign. Generally, the higher the CTR, the more effective the marketing campaign has been at bringing people to a website. Most commercial websites are designed to elicit some sort of action, whether it be to buy a book, read a news article, watch a music video, or search for a flight. People rarely visit websites with the intention of viewing advertisements, in the same way that few people watch television to view the commercials.

While marketers want to know the reaction of the web visitor, with current technology it is nearly impossible to quantify the emotional reaction to the site and the effect of that site on the firm's brand. In contrast, it is easy to determine the click-through rate, which measures the proportion of visitors who clicked on an advertisement that redirected them to another page. Forms of interaction with advertisements other than clicking are possible but rare; "click-through rate" is the most commonly used term to describe the efficacy of an advert.

== Construction ==
The click-through rate of an advertisement is the number of times a click is made on the ad, divided by the number of times the ad is "served", that is, shown (also called impressions), expressed as a percentage:

$$\text{CTR} = {\text{Number of click-throughs} \over \text{Number of impressions}} \times 100 (\%)$$

=== Online advertising ===
Click-through rates for banner ads have decreased over time. When banner ads first started to appear, it was not uncommon to have rates above five percent. They have fallen since then, averaging closer to 0.1 percent as of 2023. In most cases, a 2% click-through rate would be considered very successful, though the exact number is hotly debated and would vary depending on the situation. The average click-through rate of 3% in the 1990s declined to 2.4%–0.4% by 2002. Since advertisers typically pay more for a high click-through rate, getting many click-throughs with few purchases is undesirable to advertisers. Similarly, by selecting an appropriate advertising site with high affinity (e.g., a movie magazine for a movie advertisement), the same banner can achieve a substantially higher CTR. Though personalized ads, unusual formats, and more obtrusive ads typically result in higher click-through rates than standard banner ads, overly intrusive ads are often avoided by viewers.

Modern online advertising has moved beyond just using banner ads. Popular search engines allow advertisers to display ads with the search results triggered by a user's search. Search ads may include sitelinks, which provide additional links that direct users to specific pages on an advertiser's website, such as product or store-hours pages. This additional information moves away from the poor user experience that can be created from intrusive banner ads and provides useful information to the search user, resulting in higher click-through rates for this format of pay-per-click advertising. Since CTR is an expression of the relevancy of the ads to the user search, higher click-through rates are generally rewarded with a better quality score attributed to the ads, which in turn might lead to lower CPC, therefore incentivizing advertisers to continually improve the relevancy of their ads. However, having a high click-through rate isn't the only goal for an online advertiser, who may develop campaigns to raise awareness for the overall gain of valuable traffic, sacrificing some click-through rate for that purpose.

=== Estimating the Click-Through Rate for Ads ===
Search engine advertising has become a significant element of the Web browsing experience. Choosing the right ads for the query and the order in which they are displayed greatly affects the probability that a user will see and click on each ad. This ranking has a strong impact on the revenue the search engine receives from the ads. Further, showing the user an ad that they prefer to click on improves user satisfaction. For these reasons, there is an increasing interest in accurately estimating the click-through rate of ads in a recommender system.

=== Email ===
An email click-through rate is defined as the number of recipients who click one or more links in an email and land on the sender's website, blog, or other desired destination. More simply, email click-through rates represent the number of clicks that an email generated.

Email click-through rate is calculated by dividing the number of clicks by the number of emails delivered and multiplying by 100. Delivered emails are used rather than emails sent because bounced messages cannot generate clicks.

Most email marketers use these metrics, along with open rate, bounce rate and other metrics, to understand the effectiveness and success of their email campaign. In general, there is no ideal click-through rate. This metric can vary based on the type of email sent, how frequently emails are sent, how the list of recipients is segmented, how relevant the content of the email is to the audience, and many other factors. Even the day of the week can affect the click-through rate. Sunday appears to generate considerably higher click-through rates on average when compared to the rest of the week.

Every year, various types of research studies are conducted to track the overall effectiveness of click-through rates in email marketing.

=== Click-Through Rate and Search Engine Optimization ===
In search engine optimization, organic click-through rate refers to clicks from organic search results rather than pay-per-click advertisements. It is calculated by dividing the number of clicks an organic search listing receives by its number of impressions and multiplying by 100.

Some experts on search engine optimization (SEO) have claimed since the mid-2010s that click-through rate has an impact on organic rankings. Numerous case studies have been published to support this theory. Proponents of this theory often claim that the click-through rate is a ranking signal for Google's RankBrain algorithm.

Opponents of this theory claim that the click-through rate has little or no impact on organic rankings. Bartosz Góralewicz published the results of an experiment on Search Engine Land where he claims, "Despite popular belief, click-through rate is not a ranking factor. Even massive organic traffic won't affect your website's organic positions." More recently, Barry Schwartz wrote on Search Engine Land, "...Google has said countless times, in writing, at conferences, that CTR is not used in their ranking algorithm." However, the introduction of AI Overviews correlates with a measurable decline in organic visibility and clicks, particularly for top-ranking, non-branded keywords, according to two new data studies from SEO tool provider Ahrefs and performance agency Amsive.

Recent developments in search interfaces may also affect click-through rates independently of ranking factors. For example, the introduction of AI-generated summaries in search results has been associated with a decline in organic click-through rates for top-ranking pages, as reported by industry analyses.

== See also ==
- Abandonment rate
- Banner blindness
- Clickbait
- Click fraud
- CPA – Cost per acquisition
- Cost per action
- Cost per click
- Cost per lead
- Cost per thousand
- CPI
- eCPA – effective cost per acquisition/action
- Internet marketing
- PPC – Pay per click
- View-through rate
