= Pay-per-call advertising =

Pay-per-call (PPCall, also called cost-per-call) is an advertising model which allows companies to advertise on TV and pay for each call generated from each TV commercial aired based on a performance model and agreed upon cost per call. The Pay Per Call model allows companies to avoid expensive cash media spends for TV and radio, in favor of only paying for qualified calls.

Enterprises looking to reach certain locations, or local/regional businesses can benefit from Pay Per Call campaigns, because it allows customers to talk with the seller before buying a product or service. Vendors of pay-per-call advertising attribute the growth of the model to the popularity of smartphones and claim that it reduces the costs of on-line click fraud.

Pay-per-call advertising is not to be confused with premium-rate telephone numbers. Pay-per-call is the inverse of a premium telephone number, in that the advertiser who receives the call, not the caller, is charged for the service. Since it is cost per lead advertising, the rates are higher than for toll-free telephone number service. In general, the advertiser is only billed for calls that last at least one minute. The duration of interactions (since callers spend more time interacting with the business on the phone than looking at their website) and the probability of fraud through calls is significantly reduced are factors that might increase Pay Per Call pricing, but also increases its effectiveness.

== Description ==
Merchants define their relevant key terms, choose desired categories and a geographic area for the ad to appear (local, regional or national). From there, they create their ad, containing their company name, address, a short description and a trackable toll-free telephone number of the PPCall provider, which redirects to the advertiser's actual phone number. This type of advertisement is popular with Yellow Pages companies.

Call-tracking software allows pay-per-call advertising providers to account for results. It is used to track, record, forward and account for every call. Calls can be automatically forwarded to the advertiser or sent to a call center where potential prospects are qualified before being passed along to advertisers. Average call durations are between 2 and 4 minutes.

Pay-per-call providers have higher rates than online pay-per-click providers, citing higher consumer intent to purchase and a higher conversion rate. Providers also report that captured call-data is more detailed and actionable than click-related data. PPCall extends beyond online advertising; it can be used in print, TV and outdoor advertising. It is available to businesses that do not have a website, because it routes prospective customers to a telephone number.

This allows business of any size to deliver targeted Pay Per Call campaigns that bring them qualified leads from online and offline sources.

PPCall has been boosted by click-to-call features on smartphones, which permit a user to call a number by tapping a link, without having to dial the number manually. Apple's Mac OS X Yosemite allows the same functionality on a desktop computer. Affiliate marketing networks have introduced PPCall in the UK.
