= Pay per play =

Pay per play (PPP), also known as cash per play (CPP), is an online advertising method that plays an audio advertisement on websites. The term "pay per play" comes from advertisers paying for each audio ad played. Also, the web page playing the audio ad is normally paid for each ad they serve. Ads are typically automatically played when a visitor loads a web page. Most commonly initiated via JavaScript, audio ads normally cannot be stopped once they start. Audio ads vary in length, and a website visitor will usually hear only one advertisement per visit to any specific web page.

In radio advertising, the term "pay per play" can also refer to a relationship between advertisers and audio ad producers.

Mixberry Media launched a form of PPP allowing audio enabled web sites and mobile applications to request targeted audio ads in real time. This allows advertisers to control where their ads are heard in addition to giving the publishers full control of their user experience. This method takes advantage of "dead space" or loading time, serving audio ads while the user is waiting for audio output, gaining their focused attention.

== See also ==
- Internet marketing
- Online advertising
- Interactive advertising
