= Media Rating Council =

American nonprofit organisation

- Type: Incentive
- Industry: Nonprofit Organization
- Fate: Active
- Headquarters: United States
- Website: mediaratingcouncil.org

The Media Rating Council (MRC) is a United States–based nonprofit organization that manages accreditation for media research and rating purposes.

== Structure and accreditation process ==
The MRC has seven full-time employees, and 165 member organizations. It performs accreditations for rating and research companies like Nielsen, comScore, and multiple digital measurement services. It is funded solely by member dues, which run in the thousands of dollars.

The MRC does not conduct the audit of the companies being accredited itself. The audits are done annually by accounting firms such as Ernst & Young. The company being accredited pays for the audit, with fees that could be in the hundreds of thousands or even millions of dollars. Each time a company that was previously audited changes its methodology, it needs to be audited again to continue to qualify for MRC accreditation.

== History ==
=== Founding: Harris Committee ===
In 1960, United States Representative Oren Harris of Arkansas, chairman of the House Committee on Interstate and Foreign Commerce as well as its Special Subcommittee on Investigations, began investigating broadcast ratings. This led to a series of public hearings beginning March 5, 1963, and ending September 23, 1964, called the Harris Committee Hearings on Broadcast Ratings. The 22-page final report would be produced on January 13, 1966.

Based on the hearings, the committee felt that rather than government regulation, it would be better for the industry to fund its own organization to review and accredit audience rating services. This organization was founded as the Broadcast Rating Council in 1964. The organization would later become the Media Rating Council.

The first version of the MRC Minimum Standards became effective on March 31, 1964. The Standards relate to: (a) ethics and operations, (b) disclosures, and (c) electronic delivery. The MRC has maintained and updated the standards since they first became effective.

=== Nielsen rating controversy ===
In 2004, Nielsen made updates to its method of measuring television ratings, switching over to "local people meters" in an effort to improve the accuracy of ratings. The new method went through the MRC's accreditation process, including an audit by accounting firm Ernst & Young. Based on the audit, MRC decided on May 28, 2004, to deny accreditation, while praising the overall idea and distinguishing itself from the Don't Count Us Out Coalition, a set of sharp critics of the new methodology. Nielsen had delayed the rollout of the changes in New York from April 8 to June 3, but decided to continue with the (delayed) rollout, rolling out to New York on June 3, Los Angeles on July 8, and Chicago on August 5.

In June, the MRC urged media companies to stop the public relations campaign against Nielsen. After the Los Angeles Times published parts of the leaked confidential audit, The New York Times reported that the MRC was investigating the source of the leak.

=== Viewability standard ===
The MRC was part of efforts to push towards a standard for counting ad impressions only if a reasonable fraction of the ad content appears on the user's screen for a sufficiently long period of time – a quality called "viewability". The push was resisted by web properties that counted ads as viewed that did not appear on the screen and were not actually seen.

MRC issued its first audit advisory for viewable impressions on November 14, 2012. Starting 2013, all MRC-accredited researchers and analytics vendors were to begin counting only viewable ad impressions.

On June 30, 2014, the MRC published Version 1.0 (Final) of its Viewable Ad Impression Measurement Guidelines.

MRC released interim guidance on mobile viewable impressions on May 4, 2015, The final version of the guidelines was published on June 28, 2016.

In October 2016, it was announced that the Media Rating Council had revoked accreditation for two products of Google's Doubleclick for Publishers, namely the mobile web impression measurement and viewability metrics, for missing the one-month compliance deadline with the updated viewability standards announced by the MRC. However, Google intended to update its metrics to requalify for MRC accreditation soon.

In February 2017, under pressure from advertisers seeking validation of reported viewability metrics, both Facebook and YouTube announced that they would apply for MRC accreditation for their ad measurement (and get audited in the process).
