= Cost per lead =

Online advertising pricing model

Cost per lead (CPL) is an online advertising pricing model in which advertisers pay for a defined lead, typically the contact information of a consumer who has expressed interest in the advertiser's product or service.

Contrary to cost per mille (CPM) and cost per click (CPC) pricing models, where advertisers are charged for impressions ("views") and clicks respectively, the CPL model charges advertisers only when a qualified sign-up is generated, regardless of the number of impressions or clicks the advertisement receives.

== Difference between CPL and CPA advertising ==
In CPL campaigns, advertisers pay for an interested lead – i.e. the contact information of a person interested in the advertiser's product or service. CPL campaigns are suitable for brand marketers and direct response marketers looking to engage consumers at multiple touchpoints – by building a newsletter list, community site, reward program or member acquisition program.

In Cost per action campaigns (CPA), the advertiser typically pays for a completed sale involving a credit card transaction. CPA is all about 'now' – it focuses on driving consumers to buy at that exact moment. If a visitor to the website does not buy anything, there is no easy way to remarket to them.

There are other important differentiators:

- CPL campaigns are advertiser-centric. Advertisers retain control over their brand by selecting trusted and contextually relevant publishers to run their offers. By contrast, CPA and affiliate marketing campaigns are publisher-centric, as publishers decide which offers to run, and advertisers may have limited visibility into where their offers appear.
- CPL campaigns are usually high volume and light-weight, requiring consumers to submit only basic contact information, such as an email address. In comparison, CPA campaigns are typically lower in volume and more complex, often requiring consumers to provide credit card and other detailed information.

CPL advertising is more appropriate for advertisers looking to deploy acquisition campaigns by re-marketing to end consumers through e-newsletters, community sites, reward programs, loyalty programs and other engagement vehicles.
