= Cost per impression =

Online advertising cost per view

Cost per impression (CPI) and cost per thousand impressions (CPM) are terms used in traditional advertising media selection, as well as online advertising and marketing related to web traffic. They refer to the cost of traditional advertising or internet marketing or email advertising campaigns, where advertisers pay each time an ad is displayed. CPI is the cost or expense incurred for each potential customer who views the advertisement(s), while CPM refers to the cost or expense incurred for every thousand potential customers who view the advertisement(s). CPM is an initialism for cost per mille, with mille being Latin for thousand.

In recent years, to address the potential issue of advertisers getting charged for low-value ad impressions, a new metric has become an industry standard: viewable CPM. With this an ad is considered as 'viewable' when at least 50 per cent of a display ad is shown for one second or longer, or a video ad plays continuously for two seconds or more.

== Purpose ==
Cost per impression, along with pay-per-click (PPC) and cost per order, is used to assess the cost-effectiveness and profitability of online advertising. Cost per impression is the closest online advertising strategy to those offered in other media such as television, radio or print, which sell advertising based on estimated viewership, listenership, or readership. CPI provides a comparable measure to contrast internet advertising with other media.

=== Impression versus pageview ===
An impression is the display of an ad to a user while viewing a web page. A single web page may contain multiple ads. In such cases, a single pageview would result in one impression for each ad displayed. To count the impressions served as accurately as possible and prevent fraud, an ad server may exclude certain non-qualifying activities such as page refreshes or other user actions from counting as impressions. When advertising rates are described as CPM or CPI, this is the amount paid for every thousand qualifying impressions served at cost.

== Construction ==
Cost per impression is derived from advertising costs and the number of impressions.

Cost per impression ($) = Advertising cost ($) / Number of Impressions (#)

Cost per impression is often expressed as Cost per Thousand Impressions (CPM) to make the numbers easier to manage.

== See also ==
- Effective cost per mille (eCPM)
- Cost per action (CPA)
- Effective cost per action (eCPA)
- Click-through rate (CTR)
- Digital marketing
- Performance-based advertising
- Conversion rate (CVR)
