= Advertising network =

Company that connects advertisers to websites that want to host advertisements

An advertising network or ad network is a business that links advertisers with websites or apps that want to show ads. Its primary purpose is to match advertisers with ad publishers to fill ad space.

Ad networks have expanded from primarily TV and print advertising to online advertising. Online networks use a central ad server to send, follow, and measure ads in real time. Compared to older, non-digital media, this allows companies to better target audiences, track performance, and get more detailed reports.

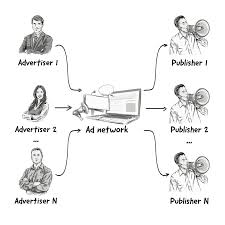
Illustration of an advertising network connecting advertisers with publishers

== Overview ==
The global advertising network market is large and continues to grow. According to WARC's Q3 2025 forecast, global advertising spending was projected to grow 7.4 percent in 2025 to reach US$1.17 trillion, with digital-first platforms capturing approximately nine out of every ten incremental ad dollars.

Online advertising inventory exists in a wide variety of formats, including placements on desktop and mobile websites, RSS feeds, blogs, instant messaging applications, mobile apps, email, and other digital media. The most prominent sources of inventory include third-party content websites that collaborate with advertising networks in exchange for revenue sharing or service fees, as well as search engines, mobile platforms, and online video services.

Advertisers may purchase either a run-of-network package or a category-specific package within an advertising network. Advertisements are typically delivered through a central ad server, which responds to a webpage request by serving the appropriate advertisement. This process is enabled through a snippet of code embedded in the publisher's site that retrieves the advertising banner from the ad server.

Large publishers often sell their remnant inventory, meaning unsold advertising space, through ad networks. Estimates suggest that between 10 and 60 percent of total inventory may be classified as remnant and sold in this way.

Smaller publishers, by contrast, frequently sell most or all of their advertising inventory through ad networks.

One type of advertising network, known as a blind network, allows advertisers to place ads without knowing the specific websites on which their advertisements will appear.

== Types ==
There are several criteria for categorizing advertising networks. In particular, the company's business strategy, as well as the quality of the networks' traffic and volume of inventory can serve as bases for categorization.

=== Based on business strategy ===
Online advertising networks can be divided into three groups based on how they work with advertisers and publishers:

1. Vertical networks: These represent the publications in their portfolio, with full transparency for the advertiser about where their ads will run. They typically promote high-quality traffic at market prices and are heavily used by brand marketers. The economic model is generally revenue share. Vertical networks offer ROS (Run-Of-Site) advertising across specific channels (for example, Auto or Travel) or they offer site-wide advertising options, in which case they operate in a similar fashion to publisher representation firms.
2. Blind networks: These companies offer good pricing to direct marketers in exchange for those marketers relinquishing control over where their ads will run, though some networks offer a "site opt out" method. The network usually runs campaigns as RON or Run-Of-Network. Blind networks achieve their low pricing through large bulk buys of typically remnant inventory combined with conversion optimization and ad targeting technology.
3. Targeted networks: Sometimes called "next generation" or "2.0" ad networks, these focus on specific targeting technologies such as behavioral or contextual, that have been built into an ad server. Targeted networks specialize in using consumer clickstream data to enhance the value of the inventory they purchase. Further specialized targeted networks include social graph technologies which attempt to enhance the value of inventory using connections in social networks.

=== Based on the number of clients and traffic quality ===
Ad networks can also be divided into first-tier and second-tier networks. First-tier advertising networks have a large number of their own advertisers and publishers, they have high quality traffic, and they serve ads and traffic to second-tier networks. Examples of first-tier networks include the major search engines. Second-tier advertising networks may have some of their own advertisers and publishers, but their main source of revenue comes from syndicating ads from other advertising networks.

While it is common for websites to be categorized into tiers, these can be misleading because tier 1 and tier 2 networks might perform differently based on different metrics, such as reach versus impressions.

== Ad targeting and optimization ==
One aspect of ad-serving technology is automated and semi-automated means of optimizing bid prices, placement, targeting, or other characteristics. Significant methods include:

- Behavioral targeting — using a profile of prior behavior on the part of the viewer to determine which ad to show during a given visit. For example, targeting car ads on a portal to a viewer who was known to have visited the automotive section of a general media site.
- Contextual targeting — (also known as Semantic Marketing) refers to the optimum ad placement as a result of analyzing information from the entire web page where the ad is being served. This concept was introduced as a way of improving the "keyword approach" to ad placement, which faced issues surrounding ambiguity in relation to a word's meaning in the prescribed context. The concept of analyzing the entire webpage in order to promote relevant advertising material is intended to benefit both the viewer of advertising content and the source of the ad. Keywords (or Adwords) are not always relevant in the context in which the word is intended. Therefore, by analyzing the entire page rather than just the keyword, the ambiguity is removed and a more relevant and accurate ad is promoted into the advertising slot on the web page.
- Creative optimization — using experimental or predictive methods to explore the optimum creative for a given ad placement and exploiting that determination in further impressions.

== Mobile and video ad networks ==
Ad networks often support a wide spectrum of ad formats (such as banners and native ads) and platforms (such as display, mobile, and video). However, some ad networks focus on particular kinds of inventory and ads:

1. Mobile ad networks focus on the traffic generated via mobile web and mobile apps, and work with the corresponding ad formats.
2. Video ad networks serve ads via inventory associated with online video content.

Video and mobile ad networks can be acquired by larger advertising companies, or operate as standalone entities.

== Issues ==
1. Lack of placement transparency: Many ad networks do not fully disclose which websites or apps display their ads. As a result, advertisers may not know exactly where their ads appear, and an ad shown next to objectionable content can damage a brand.
2. Malware and malvertising: Some networks or their partners may admit low-quality or malicious advertisers, leading to ad placements that deliver malware or unwanted behavior, a practice known as malvertising.
3. Price transparency: Although an ad network may sell inventory to an agency at a fixed cost per thousand impressions (CPM), many of the impressions within the network come from lower-quality publishers at significantly lower CPMs. As a result, the network's margin may be high and the effective value (eCPM) may be significantly lower than the amount the agency was charged.
4. Ad relevance: Ads have often been out of context with the website content, both as a consequence of opaque placement and because early ad servers lacked sophisticated contextual analysis engines.

== Online ad networks and advertising publishers ==
Most online ad network platforms allow website owners and marketers to sign up as advertising publishers. Publishers display ads supplied by the advertising network, and revenue is shared between the network and the publisher. Ad networks typically require publishers to meet minimum criteria for traffic, content quality, and compliance, and may reject or remove publishers who do not qualify. Websites with a clean interface, substantial traffic, and active user engagement are generally preferred by ad networks.

== History ==
On October 27, 1994, the first online ad was posted: a banner advertisement on a web page belonging to a precursor of the technology magazine Wired. The first central ad server was released by FocaLink Media Services on July 17, 1995, for controlling the delivery of online advertising or banner ads. Although most contemporary accounts are no longer available online, the Weizmann Institute of Science published an academic research paper documenting the launch of the first ad server. The original motherboard for the first ad server, assembled in June 1995, is also preserved. FocaLink re-launched the ad server under the name SmartBanner in February 1996. The company was founded by Dave Zinman, Andrew Conru, and Jason Strober, and was based in Palo Alto, California. In 1998, the company changed its name to AdKnowledge and was purchased by CMGI in 1999. The AdKnowledge name was subsequently purchased by a company in Kansas City in 2004, which now operates under the brand name AdKnowledge.

The first local ad server was released by NetGravity in January 1996 for delivering online advertising at major publishing sites such as Yahoo! and Pathfinder. The company was founded by Tom Shields and John Danner, and was based in San Mateo, California. In 1998, the company went public on NASDAQ (NETG), and was purchased by DoubleClick in 1999. NetGravity AdServer was then renamed to DART Enterprise. In March 2008 Google acquired DoubleClick. Google has continued to improve and invest in DART Enterprise. The latest version of the product was renamed and shipped as DoubleClick Enterprise 8.0 on September 28, 2011.

== See also ==
- Affiliate marketing
- Ad exchange
- Contextual advertising
- Digital marketing
- Landing page
- Online advertising
- Pay-per-click
- Pay per play
- Surveillance capitalism
- Website monetization
- View-through rate
