= Cost per action =

Measure of cost of online advertising

Cost per action (CPA), also sometimes misconstrued in marketing environments as cost per acquisition, is an online advertising measurement and pricing model referring to a specified action, for example, a sale, click, or form submit (e.g., contact request, newsletter sign up, registration, etc.).

Direct response advertisers often consider CPA the optimal way to buy online advertising, as an advertiser only considers the measured CPA goal as the important outcome of their activity The desired action to be performed is determined by the advertiser. In affiliate marketing, this means that advertisers only pay the affiliates for leads that result in the desired action such as a sale. This removes the risk for the advertiser because they know in advance that they will not have to pay for bad referrals, and it encourages the affiliate to send good referrals.

Radio and TV stations also sometimes offer unsold inventory on a cost per action basis, but this form of advertising is most often referred to as "per inquiry". Although less common, print media will also sometimes be sold on a CPA basis.

== CPA used as "cost per acquisition" ==
CPA is sometimes referred to as "cost per acquisition", which has to do with the fact that many actions which advertisers are optimizing towards are about acquiring something (typically new customers by making sales), although this has led to confusion in the marketing industry as to the correct meaning of CPA. Adding to the confusion, "cost per acquisition" may be used where it actually is customer acquisition cost (CAC).

=== Formula to calculate cost per action ===
Cost per action (CPA) is calculated as the cost divided by the number of actions being measured. So, for example, if the spend is $150 on a campaign and the actions attributed to this campaign are 10, this would give the campaign a cost per action of $15.

$\text{Cost per Action} = \frac{\text{Cost of campaign}}{\text{Number of actions measured}}$

== Pay per lead ==
Pay per lead (PPL) is a form of cost per action, with the "action" in this case being the delivery of a lead. It is an online and Offline advertising payment model in which fees are charged based solely on the delivery of leads.

In a pay per lead agreement, the advertiser only pays for leads delivered under the terms of the agreement. No payment is made for leads that don't meet the agreed-upon criteria. The service provider company can use multiple methods to bring traffic to a landing page designed to generate lead with validation and tracking system to make sure the client gets authentic valid leads.

Leads may be delivered by phone under the pay per call model. Conversely, leads may be delivered electronically, such as by email, SMS, or a ping/post of the data directly to a database. The information delivered may consist of as little as an email address, or it may involve a detailed profile including multiple contact points and the answers to qualification questions.

There are numerous risks associated with any pay-per-lead campaign, including the potential for fraudulent activity by incentive marketing partners. Some fraudulent leads are easy to spot. Nonetheless, it is advisable to conduct regular audits of the results.

== Differences between CPA and CPL advertising ==
In Cost Per Lead campaigns, advertisers pay for an interested lead (hence, cost per lead) — i.e., the contact information of a person interested in the advertiser's product or service. CPL campaigns are suitable for brand marketers and direct response marketers looking to engage consumers at multiple touchpoints — by building a newsletter list, community site, reward program or member acquisition program.

In CPA campaigns, the advertiser typically pays for a completed sale involving a credit card transaction.

There are other important differentiators:

- CPA and affiliate marketing campaigns are publisher-centric. Advertisers cede control over where their brand will appear, as publishers browse offers and pick which to run on their websites. Advertisers generally do not know where their offer is running.
- CPL campaigns are usually high volume and light-weight. In Cost per lead campaigns, consumers submit only basic contact information. The transaction can be as simple as an email address. On the other hand, CPA campaigns are usually low volume and complex. Typically, a consumer has to submit a credit card and other detailed information.

== PPC or CPC campaigns ==
Pay per click (PPC) and cost per click (CPC) are both forms of CPA (cost per action) with the action being a click. PPC is generally used to refer to paid search marketing such as Google's AdSense or Google Ads. The advertiser pays each time someone clicks on their text or display ad.

When advertising in the Google platform, CPC bidding means that an advertiser pays for each click of an ad placed and that, in ad campaign, he can set a price cap as a maximum CPC bid. Here, the CPC pricing is also sometimes referred to as PPC. On the Facebook social networking platform, the term pertains to the average cost for each link click and serves as a metric in online advertising for benchmarking online ad efficiency and performance.

Also, pay per download (PPD) is another form of CPA where the user completes an action to download a digital content such as apps, digital media, and other files. The actions can include completing surveys or answering quiz in order to generate revenue from a third-party advertiser.

== Tracking CPA campaigns ==
With the payment of CPA campaigns being on an "action" being delivered, accurate tracking is of prime importance to media owners.

This is a complex subject in itself, however, if usually performed in three main ways:

1. Cookie tracking – when a media owner drives a click a cookie is dropped on the prospect's computer which is linked back to the media owner when the "action" is performed.
2. Call tracking – unique telephone numbers are used per instance of a campaign. So, media owner XYZ would have their own unique phone number for an offer and when this number is called any resulting "actions" are allocated to media owner XYZ. Often payouts are based on a length of call (commonly 90 seconds) – if a call goes over 90 seconds it is viewed that there is a genuine interest, and a "lead" is paid for.
3. Promotional codes – promotional or voucher codes are commonly used for tracking retail campaigns. The prospect is asked to use a code at the checkout to qualify for an offer. The code can then be matched back to the media owner who drove the sale.

== Effective cost per action ==
A related term, effective cost per action (eCPA, eCPX), is used to measure the effectiveness of advertising inventory purchased (by the advertiser) via a cost per click, cost per impression, or cost per thousand basis.

In other words, the eCPA tells the advertiser what they would have paid if they had purchased the advertising inventory on a cost per action basis (instead of a cost per click, cost per impression, or cost per mille/thousand basis).

If the advertiser is purchasing inventory with a CPA target, instead of paying per action at a fixed rate, the goal of the effective CPA (eCPA) should always be below the maximum CPA.
