= Cost per mille =

Measurement in advertising

Cost per mille (CPM), also called cost per thousand (CPT) (in Latin, French and Italian, mille means one thousand), is a commonly used measurement in advertising. It is the cost an advertiser pays for one thousand views or impressions of an advertisement. Radio, television, newspaper, magazine, out-of-home advertising, and online advertising can be purchased on the basis of exposing the ad to one thousand viewers or listeners. It is used in marketing as a benchmarking metric to calculate the relative cost of an advertising campaign or an ad message in a given medium.

The "cost per thousand advertising impressions" metric (CPM) is calculated by dividing the cost of an advertising placement by the number of impressions (expressed in thousands) that it generates. CPM is useful for comparing the relative efficiency of various advertising opportunities or media and in evaluating the overall costs of advertising campaigns.

For media without countable views, CPM reflects the cost per 1000 estimated views of the ad. This traditional form of measuring advertising cost can also be used in tandem with performance based models such as percentage of sale, or cost per acquisition (CPA).

== Purpose ==
The purpose of the CPM metric is to compare the costs of advertising campaigns within and across different media. A typical advertising campaign might try to reach potential consumers in multiple locations and through various media. The cost per thousand impressions (CPM) metric enables marketers to make cost comparisons between these media, both at the planning stage and during reviews of past campaigns.

Marketers calculate CPM by dividing advertising campaign costs by the number of impressions (or opportunities-to-see) that are delivered by each part of the campaign. Thus, CPM is the cost of a media campaign, relative to its success in generating impressions to see. As the impression counts are generally sizeable, marketers customarily work with the CPM impressions. Dividing by 1,000 is an industry-standard.

Similarly, revenue can be expressed in terms of Revenue per mille (RPM).

In email marketing, CPM (cost per mille) refers to the cost of sending a thousand email messages. Also referred to as CPT (cost per thousand), this pricing method is used by email service providers (ESPs) to cover the cost of the mail server, bandwidth, hosting images, deliverability services, and bounce management.

There is other types of CPM and one of is vCPM (Viewable CPM). With viewable CPM, you bid on 1,000 viewable impressions and you pay for impressions that are measured as viewable. Viewable CPM lets you bid on the actual value of your ad appearing in a viewable position on a given placement. Using a higher vCPM bid than your CPM bid is usually more effective for winning these more valuable types of impressions.

== Construction ==
To calculate CPM, marketers first state the results of a media campaign (gross impressions). Second, they divide that result into the relevant media cost:

Advertising Cost ($) / Impressions Generated

For example:

1. Total cost for running the ad is $15,000.
2. The total amount of impressions generated is 2,400,000.
3. ($15,000/2,400,000)=$0.00625
4. CPM is calculated as: $0.00625x1000 (meaning per thousand impressions)=$6.25

Note: Notice how the CPM is $6.25 and not $0.00625, this is because we are looking at cost per thousand.

- In online advertising, if a website sells banner ads for a $20 CPM, that means it costs $20 to show the banner on 1000 page views.
- While the Super Bowl has the highest per-spot ad cost in the United States, it also has the most television viewers annually. Consequently, its CPM may be comparable to a less expensive spot aired during standard programming.

== Related metrics and concepts ==
=== Effective cost per mille ===
The Search Engine Marketing Professionals Organization (SEMPO) defines eCPM as:

A hybrid Cost-per-Click (CPC) auction calculated by multiplying the CPC times the click-through rate (CTR), and multiplying that by one thousand. (Represented by: (CPC x CTR) x 1000 = eCPM.) This monetization model is used by Google to rank site-targeted CPM ads (in the Google content network) against keyword-targeted CPC ads (Google AdWords PPC) in their hybrid auction.

In internet marketing, effective cost per mille is used to measure the effectiveness of a publisher's inventory being sold (by the publisher) via a CPA, CPC, or Cost per time basis. In other words, the eCPM tells the publisher what they would have received if they sold the advertising inventory on a CPM basis (instead of a CPA, CPC, or Cost per time). This information can be used to compare revenue across channels that may have widely varying traffic—by figuring the earnings per thousand impressions.

Example

- There are two banners: "Super Apps" and "Fantastic Apps".
- The publishers earn $1 per click.
- Both banners were published for the duration of one week.
- "Super Apps" was viewed by 2000 visitors from which 10 clicked on it.
- "Fantastic Apps" was viewed by 2000 visitors from which 50 clicked on it.

This shows that:

1. "Super Apps" has an eCPM of $5 (=($1*10/2000)*1000)
2. "Fantastic Apps" has an eCPM of $25 (=($1*50/2000)*1000)

=== Cost per point (CPP) or cost per rating point (CPR or CPRP) ===
CPP is the cost of an advertising campaign, relative to the rating points delivered. In a manner similar to CPM, cost per point measures the cost per rating point for an advertising campaign by dividing the cost of the advertising by the rating points delivered.

The American Marketing Association defines cost-per-rating-point (CPR or CPRP) as:

A method of comparing the cost effectiveness of two or more alternative media vehicles in radio or television. CPRP is computed by dividing the cost of the time unit or commercial by the rating of the media vehicle during that time period.

== See also ==
- CPA – Cost per action
- CPC – Cost per click
- CPI – Cost per impression
- CPL – Cost per lead
- CTR – Click-through rate
- Digital marketing
- PPC – Pay per click
- VTR – View-through rate
