= Pay-per-click =

Internet advertising model

Pay-per-click (PPC) is an online advertising model in which advertisers pay a publisher—typically a search engine or website—each time a user clicks on an advertisement.

Unlike traditional advertising, which often requires payment regardless of user engagement, PPC allows advertisers to pay only when a measurable interaction occurs, such as a click. This model enables advertisers to evaluate the effectiveness of advertisements and target specific user actions.

PPC is widely used on major search engines and platforms, including Google Ads, Amazon Advertising, and Microsoft Advertising. Advertisers bid on keywords relevant to their target audience, paying when users click on ads. These ads may be text-based, image-based, or a combination. Some publishers charge a fixed rate per click instead of using a bidding system.

Display advertisements, also known as banner ads, are shown on websites with related content that have agreed to show ads and are typically not pay-per-click advertising, but instead usually charge based on cost per thousand impressions (CPM).

Social networks such as Facebook, Instagram, LinkedIn, Reddit, Pinterest, TikTok, and X also use pay-per-click advertising. The cost for advertisers depends on the publisher and is influenced by the quality of the ad and the maximum bid; higher-quality ads generally result in lower costs per click.

However, websites can also offer PPC ads. Websites that utilize PPC ads will display an advertisement when a query (keyword or phrase) matches an advertiser's keyword list that has been added in different ad groups, or when a content site displays relevant content. Such advertisements are called sponsored links or sponsored ads, and appear adjacent to, above, or beneath organic results on search engine results pages (SERPs), or anywhere a web developer chooses on a content site.

The PPC advertising model is open to abuse through click fraud, although Google and others have implemented automated systems to guard against abusive clicks by competitors or corrupt web developers.

== Purpose ==
Pay-per-click (PPC), along with cost per impression (CPM) and cost per order, is used to assess the cost-effectiveness and profitability of internet marketing while minimizing advertising costs and maintaining campaign goals. In Cost Per Thousand Impressions (CPM), the advertiser only pays for every 1000 impressions of the ad. Pay-per-click (PPC) has an advantage over cost-per-impression in that it conveys information about how effective the advertising was. Clicks are a way to measure attention and interest. If the main purpose of an ad is to generate a click, or more specifically drive traffic to a destination, then pay-per-click is the preferred metric. The quality and placement of the advertisement affect click-through rates (CTR) and the total pay-per-click cost.

== History ==
Several sites claim to be the first PPC model on the web, with many appearing in the mid-1990s. For example, in 1996, the first known and documented version of a PPC was included in a web directory called Planet Oasis. This was a desktop application featuring links to informational and commercial websites, and it was developed by Ark Interface II, a division of Packard Bell NEC Computers. The initial reactions from commercial companies to Ark Interface II's "pay-per-visit" model were skeptical, however. By the end of 1997, over 400 major brands were paying between $.005 to $.25 per click plus a placement fee.

In February 1998 Jeffrey Brewer of Goto.com, a 25-employee startup company (later Overture, now part of Yahoo!), presented a pay per click search engine proof-of-concept to the TED conference in California. This presentation and the events that followed created the PPC advertising system. Credit for the concept of the PPC model is generally given to Idealab and Goto.com founder Bill Gross.

Google started search engine advertising in December 1999. It was not until October 2000 that the AdWords system was introduced, allowing advertisers to create text ads for placement on the Google search engine. However, PPC was only introduced in 2002; until then, advertisements were charged at cost-per-thousand impressions or Cost per mille (CPM). Overture has filed a patent infringement lawsuit against Google, saying the rival search service overstepped its bounds with its ad placement tools.

Although GoTo.com started PPC in 1998, Yahoo! did not start syndicating GoTo.com (later Overture) advertisers until November 2001. Prior to this, Yahoo's primary source of SERPs advertising included contextual IAB advertising units (mainly 468x60 display ads). When the syndication contract with Yahoo! was up for renewal in July 2003, Yahoo! announced its intent to acquire Overture for $1.63 billion. Today, companies such as adMarketplace and ValueClick offer PPC services as alternatives to AdWords and AdCenter.

Among PPC providers, Google Ads (formerly Google AdWords), Microsoft adCenter and Yahoo! Search Marketing had been the three largest network operators, all three operating under a bid-based model. For example, in the year 2014, PPC (AdWords) or online advertising contributed approximately US$45 billion of the total US$66 billion of Google's annual revenue In 2010, Yahoo and Microsoft launched their combined effort against Google, and Microsoft's Bing began to be the search engine that Yahoo used to provide its search results. Since they joined forces, their PPC platform was renamed AdCenter. Their combined network of third-party sites that allow AdCenter ads to populate banner and text ads on their site is called Bing Ads.

In June 2022, Google retired Expanded Text Ads in Google Ads, requiring advertisers to transition to Responsive Search Ads, which use machine learning to automatically test combinations of headlines and descriptions to optimise performance.

In July 2024, Google Ads made broad match the default keyword match type for new Search campaigns created with a smart bidding strategy, a significant departure from its previous default setting. Also in 2024, Google announced it would not proceed with the originally planned deprecation of third-party cookies in Google Chrome, instead allowing users to manage cookie preferences through existing browser privacy settings, preserving a significant data source for PPC targeting.

In May 2025, Google announced Smart Bidding Exploration, described by the company as its largest update to bidding in over a decade. The feature allows advertisers to set flexible return on ad spend (ROAS) targets, enabling Google's AI systems to bid on a wider range of search queries beyond those in an existing campaign's keyword set in order to identify new converting audiences.

== Construction ==
Cost-per-click (CPC) is calculated by dividing the advertising cost by the number of clicks generated by an advertisement. The basic formula is:

Cost-per-click ($) = Advertising cost ($) / Ads clicked (#)

There are two primary models for determining pay-per-click: flat-rate and bid-based. In both cases, the advertiser must consider the potential value of a click from a given source. This value is based on the type of individual the advertiser is expecting to receive as a visitor to their website, and what the advertiser can gain from that visit, which is usually short-term or long-term revenue. As with other forms of advertising, targeting is key, and factors that often play into PPC campaigns include the target's interest (often defined by a search term they have entered into a search engine or the content of a page that they are browsing), intent (e.g., to purchase or not), location (for geo-targeting) , a device used (e.g. whether the user is searching from a desktop device or mobile) and the day and time that they are browsing.

=== Flat-rate PPC ===
In the flat-rate model, the advertiser and publisher agree upon a fixed amount that will be paid for each click. In many cases, the publisher has a rate card that lists the pay-per-click (PPC) within different areas of their website or network. These various amounts are often related to the content on pages, with content that generally attracts more valuable visitors having a higher cost per click than content that attracts less valuable visitors. However, in many cases, advertisers can negotiate lower rates, especially when committing to a long-term or high-value contract.

The flat-rate model is particularly common on comparison shopping engines, which typically publish rate cards. However, these rates are sometimes minimal, and advertisers can pay more for greater visibility. These sites are usually neatly compartmentalized into product or service categories, allowing a high degree of targeting by advertisers. In many cases, the entire core content of these sites is paid ads.

=== Bid-based PPC ===
The advertiser signs a contract that allows them to compete against other advertisers in a private auction hosted by a publisher or, more commonly, an advertising network. Each advertiser informs the host of the maximum amount that he or she is willing to pay for a given ad spot (often based on a keyword), usually using online tools to do so. The auction plays out in an automated fashion every time a visitor triggers the ad spot.

When the ad spot is part of a search engine results page (SERP), the automated auction takes place whenever a search for the keyword that is being bid upon occurs. All bids for the keyword that targets the searcher's geolocation, the day and time of the search, etc. are then compared, and the winner is determined. All this happens in real-time, therefore this is called real-time-bidding or RTB, and in a fraction of a second. In situations where there are multiple ad spots, a common occurrence on SERPs, there can be multiple winners whose positions on the page are influenced by the amount each has bid and the quality of their ad. The bid and Quality Score are used to give each advertiser's advert an ad rank. The ad with the highest ad rank shows up first. The predominant three match types for both Google and Bing are Broad, Exact, and Phrase Match. Google Ads and Bing Ads also offer the Broad Match Modifier type (although Google retired it in July 2021) which differs from broad match in that the keyword must contain the actual keyword terms in any order and doesn't include relevant variations of the terms.

In addition to ad spots on SERPs, the major advertising networks allow for contextual ads to be placed on the properties of third parties with whom they have partnered. These publishers sign up to host ads on behalf of the network. In return, they receive a portion of the ad revenue that the network generates, which can be anywhere from 50% to over 80% of the gross revenue paid by advertisers. These properties are often referred to as a content network and the ads on them as contextual ads because the ad spots are associated with keywords based on the context of the page on which they are found. In general, ads on content networks have a much lower click-through rate (CTR) and conversion rate (CR) than ads found on SERPs and consequently are less highly valued. Content network properties can include websites, newsletters, and e-mails.

Advertisers pay for every single click they receive, with the actual amount paid based on the amount bid. It is common practice amongst auction hosts to charge a winning bidder just slightly more (e.g. one penny) than the next highest bidder or the actual amount bid, whichever is lower. This avoids situations where bidders are constantly adjusting their bids by very small amounts to see if they can still win the auction while paying just a little bit less per click.

In order to maximize success and achieve scale, automated bid management systems can be deployed. These systems can be used directly by the advertiser, though they are more commonly used by advertising agencies that offer PPC bid management as a service. These tools generally allow for bid management at scale, with thousands or even millions of PPC bids controlled by a highly automated system. The system generally sets each bid based on the goal that has been set for it, such as maximizing profit, maximizing traffic, getting the very targeted customer at break even, and so forth. The system is usually tied into the advertiser's website and fed the results of each click, which then allows it to set bids. The effectiveness of these systems is directly related to the quality and quantity of the performance data that they have to work with — low-traffic ads can lead to a scarcity of data problem that renders many bid management tools useless at worst, or inefficient at best.

As a rule, the contextual advertising system (Google Ads, Yandex.Direct, etc.) uses an auction approach as the advertising payment system.

== Legal ==
In 2012, Google was initially ruled to have engaged in misleading and deceptive conduct by the Australian Competition & Consumer Commission (ACCC) in possibly the first legal case of its kind. The ACCC ruled that Google was responsible for the content of its sponsored AdWords ads that had shown links to a car sales website Carsales. The ads had been shown by Google in response to a search for Honda Australia. The ACCC said the ads were deceptive, as they suggested Carsales was connected to the Honda company. The ruling was later overturned when Google appealed to the High Court of Australia. Google was found not liable for the misleading advertisements run through AdWords despite the fact that the ads were served up by Google and created using the company's tools.

== Click fraud ==
A common concern amongst advertisers is the practice known as "click fraud". This takes two forms:

1. Publishers who illegitimately click on or fraudulently arrange for clicks to be generated on adverts, in order to increase their own publisher revenues. In 2018, the FBI, in partnership with Google and other major industry ad platforms, cracked down on an illegal ad fraud scheme known as "3ve", which was estimated to have defrauded advertisers several million dollars in combined ad costs. The case highlighted the extent of ad fraud; as of 2018, ad fraud annual revenue was on track to be worth more than the illicit drug trade, with over $19 billion estimated to have been stolen by click fraudsters.
2. Advertisers who attempt to derail competitors' adverts, by clicking on them in an effort to raise their competitors' costs in order to give themselves an unfair advantage in the advertising space. The Google Ads platforms claim to be able to identify such clicks, and label such traffic as "invalid clicks".

== See also ==
- Advertising
- Click-through rate
- Digital marketing
- Opportunity to see
- Pay-per-call advertising
- Paid to click
- Search engine marketing
- Search engine optimization
