= Rosetta Stone Ltd. v. Google, Inc. =

2012 U.S. court decision

- Court: United States Court of Appeals for the Fourth Circuit
- Decided: April 9, 2012
- Citation: 676 F.3d 144 (Case No. 10-2007)

Case history
- Prior history: 730 F. Supp. 2d 531 (E.D. Va. 2010)

Holding
- The Fourth Circuit reversed the district court's grant of Google's motion for summary judgment on direct trademark infringement, contributory trademark infringement, and trademark dilution. The Fourth Circuit upheld the district court's grant of summary judgment on Google's motion for vicarious trademark infringement and upheld the district court's grant of Google's motion to dismiss for unjust enrichment.

Court membership
- Judges sitting: William B. Traxler Jr., Barbara Milano Keenan, Clyde H. Hamilton

Case opinions
- Majority: Traxler

Keywords
- Trademark; Cyberlaw; Direct Trademark infringement; Contributory Trademark infringement; Trademark dilution; Likelihood of Consumer Confusion

Rosetta Stone v. Google, 676 F.3d 144 (4th Cir. 2012) was a decision of the United States Court of Appeals for the Fourth Circuit that challenged the legality of Google's AdWords program. The Court overturned a grant of summary judgment for Google that had held Google AdWords was not a violation of trademark law (see federal Lanham Act,15 U.S.C. § 1114(1)).

Though other cases had addressed trademark infringement in the context of online keyword advertising (see Playboy Enterprises, Inc. v. Netscape Communications Corp., Google, Inc. v. American Blind & Wallpaper Factory, Inc.) Rosetta Stone v. Google is considered the last serious American challenge to Google's AdWords program. Although Rosetta Stone 'won' an overturn of summary judgment, the subsequent settlement between the two parties led commentators to declare that Google had won the keyword advertising trademark fight.

== Background ==
Google has used a version of keyword advertising, now known as Google Ads and previously known as Google AdWords, since October 2000. Google places paid ads at the top and bottom of its search results page. Every time someone enters a search, Google runs an auction to determine which ads to show. The auction takes into account the relevancy of the ad as well as the monetary bid that has been made for that keyword by each advertiser. Most advertisers with Google pay on a cost per click basis.

In 2004, Google changed its policy and began allowing advertisers to bid on trademarked words. In 2009, Google further changed its AdWord policy now allowing use of trademarks both in advertising text and as advertisement keywords. As a result of the policy change, more than twenty lawsuits were filed against Google alleging trademark infringement.

In response to the changed AdWord policy, Rosetta Stone, the maker of popular foreign language learning software, filed suit against Google for violating the Lanham Act, claiming Google was "helping third parties to mislead consumers and misappropriate the Rosetta Stone Marks by using them as "keyword" triggers for paid advertisements and by using them within the text or title of paid advertisements". Rosetta Stone sued specifically for: direct trademark infringement, contributory trademark infringement, vicarious trademark infringement, and trademark dilution. Rosetta Stone also sued for unjust enrichment under Virginia state law.

The district court granted Google's motion for summary judgment on all Lanham Act claims finding there had been no consumer confusion, Google's use of the trademarked keywords was functional, and the use of the trademarked keywords was either nominative fair use or contributed to an increase in Rosetta Stone's brand recognition. The district court also granted Google's motion to dismiss Rosetta Stone's unjust enrichment claim. Rosetta Stone appealed to the Fourth Circuit on all claims, which reviewed the case de novo.

== Holding of the Court ==
The Fourth Circuit reversed the district court's grant of summary judgment for the direct trademark infringement, contributory trademark infringement and trademark dilution. The Court affirmed the grant of summary judgment for the vicarious trademark infringement claim and upheld the motion to dismiss for unjust enrichment on a different reasoning than the district court.

== Analysis ==
=== Direct trademark infringement ===
To prevail on a direct trademark infringement under the Lanham Act a plaintiff must prove:

1. That they own the valid mark
2. Defendant used the mark in commerce and without the Plaintiff's authorization
3. Defendant used the mark (or an imitation of it) "in connection with the sale, distribution, or advertising" of goods or services; and
4. Defendant's use of the mark is likely to confuse consumers

On appeal only the 'likelihood of confusion' prong was in dispute. In the Fourth Circuit, the likelihood of confusion is determined by looking at nine factors: (1) the strength or distinctiveness of the plaintiff's mark as actually used in the marketplace; (2) the similarity of the two marks to consumers; (3) the similarity of the goods or services that the marks identify; (4) the similarity of the facilities used by the markholders; (5) the similarity of advertising used by the markholders; (6) the defendant's intent; (7) actual confusion; (8) the quality of the defendant's product; and (9) the sophistication of the consuming public.

The Court first affirmed the district court's limited factor analysis. The district court had only looked at the intent, actual confusion, and sophistication of the consuming public factors. However, the Court faulted the district court's reasoning on all the three factors.

The Court pointed to Google's change of the AdWord trademark policy, and Google's expectation of trademark lawsuits as a result of that change, to find that there was a genuine issue of fact as to Google's intent and overruled the district court's grant of summary judgment.

As to actual consumer confusion, the Court held that the district court had failed to properly take into account sponsorship confusion. The Lanham Act allows for consumer confusion as to the source of where goods originate, or confusion on whether a good is sponsored by a trademark holder. Therefore, the Court found the district court's viewing of actual consumer confusion evidence to be flawed. Viewing that evidence itself, the Court found that the depositions of actual consumers testifying to confusion and the number of complaints to Rosetta Stone's customer care center, raised a genuine issue of fact as to whether there was actual confusion and overruled the district court's grant of summary judgment.

Finally, the Court found the sophistication of the consuming public was too fact determinative to be decided on a motion for summary judgment.

=== Functionality ===
The functionality doctrine in trademark law prohibits trademark rights in functional features of a product or its packaging.(15 U.S.C. § 1052(e)(5)) Functional is defined as a product feature that is essential to the use or purpose of the article or if that feature affects the cost or quality of the article.

The district court had found that even if Rosetta Stone could make a case for consumer confusion, it would grant summary judgment on the direct trademark claim, based on the functionality doctrine. The district court found that the keywords had an essential indexing function by allowing Google to readily identify information in its databases. The district court also found the keywords serve an advertising function for consumers, allowing them to locate particular information, goods, or services, and to compare price.

The Court completely rejected application of the functionality doctrine under these circumstances. The Court ruled that the proper place to analyze functionality is in relation to how the trademark relates to the functionality of the actual product not whether it makes Google's computer program function better.

=== Contributory infringement ===
Contributory infringement occurs when a manufacturer or distributor intentionally induces another to infringe a trademark, or if it continues to supply its product to one whom it knows or has reason to know is engaging in trademark infringement. Under these situations, the manufacturer or distributor is contributorily responsible for any harm done as a result of the deceit. General knowledge is not enough; the defendant must supply its product or services to "identified individuals" that it knows or has reason to know are engaging in trademark infringement.

The district court relied on Tiffany Inc. v. eBay, Inc., where the Second Circuit rejected a contributory trademark infringement claim against eBay by Tiffany's, to rule against Rosetta Stone's contributory infringement claim. In that case, the Second Circuit had ruled that the receipt of thousands of notices of counterfeit Tiffany jewelry did not amount to "knows or has reason to know" on the behalf of eBay. The district court found Rosetta Stone's delivery of around 200 notices of sponsored links advertising counterfeit Rosetta Stone software was insufficient to prove that Google knew or had reason to know that the sites were engaging in trademark infringement.

The Court reversed, finding that the district court's evaluation of the evidence found Rosetta Stone did not meet its burden for summary judgment. However, the question was whether Google had met its burden for summary judgment and given the evidence to support Rosetta Stone's claim, and that Tiffany Inc. v. eBay, Inc. was decided after a trial and hence of limited application here, the Court overruled the district court's grant of summary judgment.

=== Unjust enrichment ===
The district court held that Rosetta Stone had failed to allege an implicit promise to pay, thus granting Google's motion to dismiss. The Court found this a misreading of the unjust enrichment standard, but upheld the motion to dismiss on the ground that Rosetta Stone failed to allege facts showing that it conferred a benefit on Google, for which Google should reasonably be expected to repay.

=== Trademark dilution ===
In 1996, Congress enacted The Federal Trademark Dilution Act (Amended in 2006 with the passage of the Trademark Dilution Revision Act of 2006) that established a federal claim for trademark dilution. To state a prima facie dilution claim the plaintiff must plead that:

1. She owns a famous mark that is distinctive
2. The defendant has commenced using a mark in commerce that allegedly is diluting the famous mark
3. That a similarity between the Defendant's mark and the famous mark gives rise to an association between the marks; and
4. That the association is likely to impair the distinctiveness of the famous mark or likely to harm the reputation of the famous mark

Trademark dilution does not rely on consumer confusion, instead dilution is concerned with the whittling away of the established trademark's selling power and value through its unauthorized use by others.

The district court had granted Google's motion for summary judgment as to the dilution claim for two reasons. First, Google's use of Rosetta Stone's mark was not to identify its own goods and services and therefore the Lanham Act's nominative fair use provisions shielded Google from Rosetta Stone's claim. Second, Rosetta Stone's trademark was not diluted because Rosetta Stone had failed to establish that Google's use was likely to impair the distinctiveness of the famous mark or likely to harm the reputation of the famous mark. In ruling against dilution, the district court primarily relied on an increase of Rosetta Stone brand awareness since the introduction of Google's new AdWord trademark policy .

With regards to fair use, the Court found that the nominative fair use provisions were a defense, putting the burden on Google not Rosetta Stone to prove. Furthermore, the district court had failed to analyze whether Google had acted in good faith, a requirement for fair use.

With regard to the second reason, the Court found that likelihood of dilution is a six factored analysis, in which a court should look at:

- The degree of similarity between the mark or trade name and the famous mark
- The degree of inherent or acquired distinctiveness of the famous mark
- The extent to which the owner of the famous mark is engaging in substantially exclusive use of the mark
- The degree of recognition of the famous mark
- Whether the user of the mark or trade name intended to create an association with the famous mark
- Any actual association between the mark or trade name and the famous mark

The district court only analyzed one factor, the degree of recognition of Rosetta Stone's mark. The Court remanded so that the lower court could address additional factors that may apply.

== Subsequent Development ==
Before a new trial could commence, Rosetta Stone and Google agreed to settle all claims. On October 31, 2012, the two companies released a joint statement through Reuters stating, "Rosetta Stone Inc and Google have agreed to dismiss the three-year-old trademark infringement lawsuit between them and to meaningfully collaborate to combat online ads for counterfeit goods and prevent the misuse and abuse of trademarks on the Internet." The terms of the settlement were not disclosed.

== Implications ==
Google relies on AdWord as a primary revenue generator for its $60 billion business. Though it is unknown how much of that revenue is trademark related, a negative ruling could have significantly affected Google's revenue.

After the Second Circuit's decision in Rescuecom Corp. v. Google Inc. it has become fairly settled that keyword advertising satisfies the 'use in commerce' prong of direct trademark infringement. That decision shifted the question of whether a company had a valid trademark claim against Google's AdWord to whether a trademark owner could prove a likelihood of confusion. The Rosetta Stone v. Google court's finding that there were genuine material issue of fact as to the question of Google's intent, whether there was actual customer confusion, and the consuming public's sophistication, was initially viewed as giving trademark owners an opportunity to prove likelihood of confusion in direct trademark suits against Google and other keyword advertisers. The settlement of the parties, however, took away the chance to prove that theory and essentially resolved the last significant challenge to Google's new trademark policy. Currently, with Google's multiple wins in suits alleging trademark infringement in the United States, along with the recent win by Google in European Court of Justice, commenters are beginning to declare search engines' keyword advertising programs safe from trademark infringement suits.

== See also ==
=== General Information ===
- Trademark
- Trademark infringement
- Trademark dilution
- Legal aspects of computing
- Cyberlaw
- Virtual property

=== Cases ===
- Rescuecom Corp. v. Google Inc. 562 F.3d 123 (2nd Cir. 2009).
- 1-800 Contacts v. Lens.com 2013 WL 3665627 (10th Cir. 2013).
- Brookfield Communications, Inc. v. West Coast Entertainment Corp., 174 F.3d 1036 (9th Cir. 1999).
- Network Automation, Inc. v. Advanced Systems Concepts, Inc., 638 F.3d 1137 (9th Cir. 2011).
- Google France v. Louis Vuitton, ECJ, Judgment of 23 March 2010, C-236/08 to C-238/08.
