= Google litigation =

Lawsuits and legal cases involving Google

Google has been involved in multiple lawsuits over issues such as privacy, advertising, intellectual property and various Google services such as Google Books, YouTube, and Google Images. Google was found to have violated anti-trust law with its monopolization of the internet search and advertising market.

The FTC's largest civil penalty was for a case in which the United States showed that Google violated its own privacy policy and previous FTC orders by putting HTTP cookies in the Safari web browser despite privacy assurances. In other cases Google Ads had allowed any advertiser to bind their ads to competitor's trademarks. This practice may have violated trademark law, but was settled without a clear judgement. Google also had to defend its trademark over Google following the adoption of google as a verb. The company has defended itself in law suits alleging it discriminates against white and Asian men during hiring and against women at work.

Google's development of Android was challenged by Oracle's intellectual property claims but was found to be fair use. The Google Play store has been challenged by parents and app makers for fees it charges on in-app purchases.

== Privacy ==
=== United States v. Google Inc. ===
United States vs. Google Inc. is a case in which the United States District Court for the Northern District of California approved a stipulated order for a permanent injunction and a $22.5 million civil penalty judgment, the largest civil penalty the Federal Trade Commission (FTC) had ever won. The FTC and Google consented to the entry of the stipulated order to resolve the dispute which arose from Google's violation of its privacy policy. In this case, the FTC found Google liable for misrepresenting "privacy assurances to users of Apple's Safari Internet browser". It was reached after the FTC considered that through the placement of advertising tracking cookies in the Safari web browser, and while serving targeted advertisements, Google violated the 2011 FTC's administrative order issued in FTC v. Google Inc.

=== Google Spain v AEPD and Mario Costeja González ===
Google Spain SL, Google Inc. v Agencia Española de Protección de Datos, Mario Costeja González was a decision by the Court of Justice of the European Union holding that an internet search engine operator is responsible for the processing that it carries out of personal information which appears on web pages published by third parties.

=== Hibnick v. Google, Inc. ===
Hibnick v Google was a class action suit against Google in 2010. The suit accused Google of breaching several electronic communications laws with the launch of their new product Google Buzz. Google Buzz was a social media network that automatically plugged into Gmail.

=== Joffe v. Google, Inc. ===
Joffe v. Google, Inc. was a federal lawsuit between Ben Joffe and Google, Inc. that entered official Supreme Court jurisdiction in November 2010. Joffe claimed that Google broke one of the Wiretap Legislation segments when they intruded on the seemingly “public” wireless networks of private homes through their Street View application. Although Google appealed multiple times, the courts ruled in favor of Joffe.

=== Mosley v SARL Google ===
Mosley v SARL Google was a 2013 French court case in which former President of the Fédération Internationale de l'Automobile Max Mosley attempted to make the internet search engine Google remove images of him engaging in a sado-masochistic sex act with several prostitutes. The publication of the images in the (now defunct) British newspaper The News of the World was litigated in Mosley v News Group Newspapers and resulted in Mr Mosley being awarded £60,000 in damages.

=== Rocky Mountain Bank v. Google, Inc. ===
Rocky Mountain Bank v. Google Inc. was a decision by the United States District Court for the Northern District of California holding that Google had to reveal the account information of a Gmail user who had been mistakenly sent sensitive information from Rocky Mountain Bank.

=== Patacsil v. Google,. Inc. ===
Patacsil v. Google,. Inc. In re Google Location History Litigation, Case No. 5:18-cv-05062, U.S. District Court for the District of Northern California. The law firm Franklin D. Azar and Associates, P.C. was appointed interim class counsel in this privacy case by users of Google Maps or other Google applications, alleging that Google deliberately collected personal information from individuals in order to generate millions of dollars in revenue by covertly recording contemporaneous location data about users on their mobile devices who had specifically opted out of such tracking.

== Advertising ==
=== Google, Inc. v. American Blind & Wallpaper Factory, Inc. ===
Google, Inc. v. American Blind and Wallpaper Factory, Inc., No. 5:03-cv-05340 (N.D. Cal. April 18, 2007), was a decision of the United States District Court for the Northern District of California that challenged the legality of Google's AdWords program. The court concluded that, pending the outcome of a jury trial, Google AdWords may be in violation of trademark law (see federal Lanham Act, 15 U.S.C. § 1114(1)) because it (1) allowed arbitrary advertisers to key their ads (see keyword advertising) to American Blind's trademarks and (2) may confuse search-engine users initially interested in visiting American Blind's website into visiting its competitors' websites (see Initial Interest Confusion doctrine).

Google v. American Blind was not the first case to address trademark infringement in the context of online keyword advertising (see Playboy Enterprises, Inc. v. Netscape Communications Corp., 1-800-CONTACTS v. WhenU Inc.). Nevertheless, it generated interest in the trademark-law community because it came on the heels of Playboy v. Netscape—a case that failed to resolve the legality of keyword advertising in which the origins of ads are clearly designated. Despite a four-year battle, American Blind settled with Google soon after this decision, hence leaving much of this legal territory unexplored.

=== Rescuecom Corp. v. Google Inc. ===
Rescuecom Corp. v. Google Inc. was a United States Court of Appeals for the Second Circuit case in which the court held that recommending a trademark for keyword advertising was a commercial use of the trademark, and could constitute trademark infringement. The case involved Rescuecom. Prior to the case's resolution, Google recommended the 'Rescuecom' trademark to businesses (including Rescuecom's competitors), that were buying keywords through Google's AdWords product.

=== Rosetta Stone v. Google Inc. ===
Rosetta Stone v. Google, 676 F.3d 144 (4th Cir. 2012) was a decision of the United States Court of Appeals for the Fourth Circuit that challenged the legality of Google's AdWords program. The Court overturned a grant of summary judgment for Google that had held Google AdWords was not a violation of trademark law (see federal Lanham Act,15 U.S.C. § 1114(1)).

Though other cases had addressed trademark infringement in the context of online keyword advertising (see Playboy Enterprises, Inc. v. Netscape Communications Corp., Google, Inc. v. American Blind & Wallpaper Factory, Inc.) Rosetta Stone v. Google is considered the last serious American challenge to Google's AdWords program. Although Rosetta Stone 'won' an overturn of summary judgment, the subsequent settlement between the two parties led commentators to declare that Google had won the keyword advertising trademark fight.

=== Goddard v. Google, Inc. ===
Goddard v. Google, Inc. is a case in which Jenna Goddard alleged that she was harmed by Google as a result of clicking allegedly fraudulent web-based advertisements for mobile subscription services. The United States District Court for the Northern District of California held that the action was barred by Section 230 of the Communications Decency Act ("CDA") and dismissed the complaint.

== Censorship ==
=== Garcia v. Google, Inc. ===
Garcia v. Google, Inc. is a case where Cindy Lee Garcia sued Google and its video-sharing website, YouTube, to have the controversial film, Innocence of Muslims, taken down from the site. A California district court denied Garcia's motion for preliminary injunction, but, on appeal, the United States Court of Appeals for the Ninth Circuit reversed the lower court's decision, ordered YouTube to take down all copies of Innocence of Muslims, and remanded the case to the district court for reconsideration. In May 2015, in an en banc opinion, the Ninth Circuit reversed the panel's decision, vacating the order for the preliminary injunction.

=== Russia v. Google, Inc. ===
On October 31, 2024, Google was ordered to pay $20 decillion (Note: 20 decillion is 20,000,000,000,000,000,000,000,000,000,000,000) by the Russian government following the removal of 17 pro-Kremlin YouTube channels, several of which have been blocked since the Russian invasion of Ukraine in 2022. Kremlin spokesman Dmitry Peskov defended the large sum of money, as "it is rather filled with symbolism," and stated that "[Google] should not restrict our broadcasters on their platform. This should be a reason for the Google leadership to pay attention to this and improve the situation."

== Defamation ==
=== Bleyer v. Google Inc ===
On August 12, 2014, the Supreme Court of New South Wales found in the case of Bleyer v Google Inc [2014] NSWSC 897 that Google was not a publisher of automated search results before receiving complaints, and permanently stayed defamation proceedings on proportionality grounds. Roland Bleyer sued Google over search results that had been viewed by only three people, but Justice McCallum ruled that with estimated legal costs of A$370,000 (equivalent to $444,000 in 2022) against minimal publication and likely unenforceable judgment, the proceedings were "vastly disproportionate" and constituted an abuse of process.

The decision established Australia's first application of the proportionality principle in defamation law, allowing courts to dismiss cases where litigation costs far exceed the interests at stake, and became a landmark precedent for when internet companies can be held legally responsible for content created by others. The case influenced subsequent defamation law reforms including specific search engine exemptions in Australia's 2024 Model Defamation Provisions.

=== Duffy v. Google Inc ===
On October 27, 2015, the Supreme Court of South Australia found in the case of Duffy v Google Inc [2015] SASC 170 that Google Autocomplete perpetuated a defamation of the plaintiff for which Google was liable.

=== Defteros v. Google LLC ===
On April 30, 2020, the Supreme Court of Victoria found in the case of Defteros v Google LLC [2020] VSC 219 that Google could be held liable for defamation in Australia. "The Court held that Google does publish webpages reached by clicking on hyperlinks within Google search results. The resolution of the publication issue was a necessary step to Google’s liability; Google succeeded on some defences and failed on others. Defteros was awarded $40,000."

On August 17, 2022, Australia's highest court ruled that Google was not liable. A joint statement by Chief Justice Susan Kiefel and Justice Jacqueline Gleeson said, “In reality, a hyperlink is merely a tool which enables a person to navigate to another webpage."

== Intellectual property ==
=== Agence France Presse ===
In March 2005, Agence France Presse (AFP) sued Google for copyright infringement in federal court in the District of Columbia, a case which Google settled for an undisclosed amount in a pact that included a license of the full text of AFP articles for use on Google News.

=== Authors Guild, Inc. v. Google, Inc. ===
Authors Guild v. Google was a copyright case litigated in the United States centering on the allegations by the Authors Guild that Google infringed their copyrights in developing its Google Book Search database. The Google Book Search Settlement Agreement was a proposed settlement agreement between the Authors Guild, the Association of American Publishers and Google in settlement of Authors Guild et al. v. Google, a class action lawsuit alleging copyright infringement. The settlement was initially proposed in 2008, and ultimately rejected by the court in 2011. In late 2013, the presiding U.S. Circuit Judge dismissed Authors Guild et al. v. Google.

=== Viacom International Inc. v. YouTube, Inc. ===
Viacom International, Inc. v. YouTube, Inc. is a U.S. District Court for the Southern District of New York case in which Viacom sued alleging that YouTube had engaged in "brazen" and "massive" copyright infringement by allowing users to upload and view hundreds of thousands of videos owned by Viacom without permission. A motion for summary judgement seeking dismissal was filed by Google and was granted in 2010 on the grounds that the Digital Millennium Copyright Act's "safe harbor" provisions shielded Google from Viacom's copyright infringement claims. In 2012, on appeal to the United States Court of Appeals for the Second Circuit, it was overturned in part. On April 18, 2013, District Judge Stanton again granted summary judgment in favor of defendant YouTube. An appeal was begun, but the parties settled in March 2014.

=== Field v. Google, Inc. ===
Field v. Google, Inc. is a case where Google successfully defended a lawsuit for copyright infringement. Field argued that Google infringed his exclusive right to reproduce his copyrighted works when it cached his website and made a copy of it available on its search engine. Google raised multiple defenses: fair use, implied license, estoppel, and Digital Millennium Copyright Act safe harbor protection. The court granted Google's motion for summary judgment and denied Field's motion for summary judgment.

=== Mian Mian lawsuit ===
In December 2009, Chinese writer Mian Mian filed a lawsuit against the company, for scanning her entire novel without notifying her or paying her for copyright permission. Google removed Mian's work from its online library shortly after learning of the suit. In January 2013, a Chinese court ordered Google to pay Mian compensation of 5,000 yuan (US$800) for scanning her works without permission.

=== Bedrock Computer Technologies, LLC vs. Google, Inc ===
In 2016, a Texas jury awarded Bedrock Computer Technologies $5 million in a patent lawsuit against Google. The patent allegedly covered use of hash tables with garbage collection and separate chaining in the Red Hat Linux kernel. Google and Bedrock later settled the case and the judgment was vacated by the court.

=== Google LLC v. Oracle America, Inc. ===
Google LLC v. Oracle America, Inc. is a dispute related to Oracle's copyright and patent claims on Google's Android operating system specifically in context of the application programming interfaces (APIs) from the Java implementation that Google had initially used in developing the Android system. The case, originally filed by Oracle in 2010, has had a complex history between two separate hearings and jury trials at the United States District Court for the Northern District of California and two subsequent appeals at the United States Court of Appeals for the Federal Circuit. In May 2012, Judge William Alsup of the Northern District of California ruled that APIs are not subject to copyright. Judge Alsup determined that where "there is only one way to declare a given method functionality, [so that] everyone using that function must write that specific line of code in the same way," that coding language cannot be subject to copyright. In May 2013, Oracle appealed Judge Alsup's ruling to the U.S. Court of Appeals for the Federal Circuit and on May 9, 2014, the Federal Circuit reversed Judge Alsup's finding that Java APIs are copyrightable, leaving open the possibility that Google might have a fair use defense. In October 2014, Google filed a petition to ask the Supreme Court to review the Federal Circuit's decisions and was denied. As the case returned to the district court for Google's fair use defense, in May 2016, a jury unanimously agreed that Google's use of the Java APIs was fair use. Oracle then filed another appeal and in March 2018, the United States Court of Appeals for the Federal Circuit rejected the jury's verdict and reversed the district court's decision again held that Google's use was not a fair use as a matter of law. In 2019, Google filed another petition asking the U.S. Supreme Court to review both Federal Circuit decisions. The Court heard oral arguments in October 2020 and issued its opinion in April 2021, reversing the Federal Circuit and holding that Google's use of Java APIs was protected by fair use.

=== Perfect 10, Inc. v. Google, Inc. ===
Perfect 10 v. Google, Inc., et al. was a U.S. court case for Google to stop creating and distributing thumbnails of Perfect 10's images in its Google Image Search service, and for it to stop indexing and linking to sites hosting such images. In early 2006, the court granted the request in part and denied it in part, ruling that the thumbnails were likely to be found infringing but the links were not.

=== Roey Gorodish v. Waze & Google Israel ===
A class action suit was filed in March 2014 by accountant Roey Gorodish against Google Israel and Waze (acquired by Google), claiming intellectual property violations for the use of open-source FreeMap map and code from the open-source RoadMap software, a project which Ehud Shabtai had contributed for the Windows PocketPC version in 2006. The lawsuit was dismissed twice in Israeli courts, final verdict given by the Israeli supreme on 28 January 2019.

In January 2020, Roey Gorodish and Baruch Krotman, filed a regular lawsuit against the company.

=== Genericide of "google" ===
In 2017, David Elliot and Chris Gillespie argued before the Ninth Circuit of the United States Court of Appeals that "google" had suffered genericide. The controversy began in 2012 when Gillespie acquired 763 domain names containing the word "google". The company promptly filed a complaint with the National Arbitration Forum (NAF). Elliot then filed a petition for canceling the Google trademark. Ultimately, the court ruled in favor of Google because Elliot failed to show a preponderance of evidence showing the genericide of "google".

== Discrimination ==
Google is currently fighting a lawsuit filed by the US labor department claiming gender discrimination. Officials of Google said it was too financially burdensome and logistically challenging to hand over salary records that the government requested in order to investigate. A judge has however ordered Google to hand over salary records to the government in this ongoing investigation by the US Department of Labor.

=== James Damore et al. v. Google, LLC ===
In a lawsuit filed January 8, 2018, multiple employees and job applicants alleged Google discriminated against a class defined by their “conservative political views[,] male gender[,] and/or […] Caucasian or Asian race”.

=== Arne Wilberg v. Google, Inc. ===
On January 29, 2018, YouTube technical recruiter Arne Wilberg filed a suit accusing Google “of systematically discriminating in favor of job applicants who are Hispanic, African American, or female, and against Caucasian and Asian men.”

=== Kelly Ellis et al VS. Google, Inc. ===
On August 14, 2017, three former employees of Google have filed a class action lawsuit against the internet company, alleging a pattern of discrimination against women workers, including systemically lower pay than their male counterparts. The lawsuit was settled in June 2022 for $118 million.

== Microtransactions ==
=== In-app purchases class action ===
In 2014 a parent filed a class action lawsuit against Google for "in-app" purchases, which are microtransactions that can be made within applications. This lawsuit followed a class action lawsuit and investigation by the Federal Trade Commission against Apple Inc. over similar complaints. (See Apple Inc. litigation -- In-app purchases class action). The parent contended that there is a 30-minute window during which authorizations can be made for credit card purchases that are designed to entice children to make such purchases in "free apps", and that Google should have been aware of the issue because of the Apple litigation.

=== Epic Games v. Google ===
On August 13, 2020, Epic Games filed an antitrust lawsuit against Google following the removal of the Epic-developed game Fortnite from Google Play, after an update release allowed Epic to directly sell microtransactions, bypassing the 30 percent revenue share with Google. Epic alleges that Google is using the 30 percent revenue share imposed on developers to enforce a monopoly on development for Android. Simultaneously, Epic filed a similar lawsuit against Apple Inc, which had also removed Fortnite from the App Store (iOS) for similar reasons.

In October 2021, Google launched a counter-suit against Epic Games, asserting that Epic was in violation of its Play Store contract terms when it added a new Fortnite version without its payment system.

=== Match Group v. Google ===
On May 9, 2022, Match Group sued Google over its strategic manipulation of markets and abuse of power where mandating Match Group to use Google's billing system to remain in the Google Play Store. The lawsuit, filed in the Northern District of California, accuses the company of deploying “anticompetitive tactics” to maintain a monopoly on the Android mobile ecosystem.

== Antitrust ==
=== European Union ===
Since 2010, the European Union has investigated several antitrust complaints against Google alleging abuses of its dominant position in breach of the EU's competition laws. Three complaints have resulted in formal charges against Google: those relating to Google Shopping, the Android operating system and to Google AdSense. Google has been found guilty of antitrust breaches in the three cases and has been fined over €8 billion. In 2020, the European Union has also launched a full investigation of Google's proposed acquisition of the fitness tracker and wearable health company Fitbit, under the EU Merger Regulation. The operation was eventually cleared on 17 December 2020 subject to conditions.

=== Umar Javeed, Sukarma Thapar, Aaqib Javeed vs. Google LLC & Ors. ===
A two-year antitrust probe by the Competition Commission of India (CCI) was launched into Google's Android business in India. In 2021, the CCI reported that Google reduced "the ability and incentive of device manufacturers to develop and sell devices operating on alternative versions of Android."

=== United States v. Google (2020) ===
In 2020, the US Department of Justice and a group of 38 state attorneys general sued Google for monopolizing the search engine market in violation of the Sherman Antitrust Act. They accused the company of acquiring competitors, locking in clients with its platforms, and exploiting or distorting auction mechanisms for ads. It has also been accused of paying billions each year to mobile network operators and smartphone manufacturers to ensure that Google's service remains as the default search engine on their devices. Microsoft testified at the trial saying that even revenue-sharing deals at 100% or more for phone makers were at times turned down by them, preventing Microsoft Bing from scaling and improving the quality of its search results. Google's lawyer questioned whether it was money or quality that has made it difficult for Bing to challenge Google. In August 2024, the district judge ruled that Google violated the Sherman Act.

=== United States v. Google (2023) ===
United States v. Google LLC is a federal antitrust case brought by the United States Department of Justice (DOJ) against Google LLC on January 24, 2023. The suit established that Google illegally monopolized the Ad tech market in violation of sections 1 and 2 of the Sherman Antitrust Act of 1890. The suit is separate from the first antitrust case launched in 2020 which established that Google illegally monopolized the search engine market.

Filed in the U.S. District Court for the Eastern District of Virginia, the suit aimed to force Google to sell off significant portions of adtech business and require the company to cease certain business practices. The trial concluded in September 2024. On April 17, 2025, it was ruled that Google had formed an illegal monopoly in its advertising business.

=== Australia ===
In September 2021, the Australian government announced plans to curb Google's capability to sell targeted ads, claiming that the company has a monopoly on the market harming publishers, advertisers, and consumers.

== Law enforcement ==
=== Gonzales v. Google ===
On January 18, 2006, the U.S. Justice Department sought to compel Google to turn over one million web addresses from the company's database and one week's worth of search engine queries absent any personal information. Attorney General Alberto Gonzales said the request was intended to help fight Internet pornography and counter legal challenges to the Child Online Protection Act. Google maintains that their policy has always been to assure its users' privacy and anonymity and challenged the subpoena on the grounds that its trade secrets would be compromised. On March 18, 2006, a federal judge ruled that while Google must surrender 50,000 random URLs, the Department of Justice did not meet the necessary burden to force Google to disclose any search terms entered by its users in Google.

== Staff ==
The company's legal department expanded from one to nearly 100 lawyers in the first five years of business, and by 2014 had grown to around 400 lawyers. Google's Chief Legal Officer is David Drummond.

== See also ==
- High-Tech Employee Antitrust Litigation
- Smartphone patent wars
- Antitrust cases against Google by the European Union
- Waymo LLC v. Uber Technologies, Inc. et al.
