= Google, Inc. v. American Blind & Wallpaper Factory, Inc. =

Legal case

- Court: United States District Court for the Northern District of California
- Decided: April 18, 2007
- Docket nos.: 5:03-cv-05340

Holding
- Google's request for summary judgment that AdWords does not infringe American Blind's trademarks was in part denied because of insufficient facts to establish that Google's use of those marks did not cause consumer confusion.

Court membership
- Judge sitting: Jeremy Fogel

Keywords
- AdWords, Trademark

Google, Inc. v. American Blind and Wallpaper Factory, Inc., No. 5:03-cv-05340 (N.D. Cal. April 18, 2007), was a decision of the United States District Court for the Northern District of California that challenged the legality of Google's AdWords program. The court concluded that, pending the outcome of a jury trial, Google AdWords may be in violation of trademark law (see federal Lanham Act, 15 U.S.C. § 1114(1)) because it (1) allowed arbitrary advertisers to key their ads (see keyword advertising) to American Blind's trademarks and (2) may confuse search-engine users initially interested in visiting American Blind's website into visiting its competitors' websites (see Initial Interest Confusion doctrine).

Google v. American Blind was not the first case to address trademark infringement in the context of online keyword advertising (see Playboy Enterprises, Inc. v. Netscape Communications Corp., 1-800-CONTACTS v. WhenU Inc.). Nevertheless, it generated interest in the trademark-law community because it came on the heels of Playboy v. Netscape—a case that failed to resolve the legality of keyword advertising in which the origins of ads are clearly designated. Despite a four-year battle, American Blind settled with Google soon after this decision, hence leaving much of this legal territory unexplored.

== Background ==
=== Facts ===
Google's AdWords program enables advertisers to trigger a display of their ads when Google users perform keyword searches. Per Google policy, advertisers may trigger their ads on arbitrary keywords, including trademarked keywords that they do not own. This permits competitors of American Blinds to place their ads alongside American Blind's ads when a user searches for "American Blind", "American Blinds", or "Decoratetoday"—all of which are registered trademarks of American Blind. In its stated objective to minimize user confusion concerning the affiliation of the ads, Google places ads in specially marked "Sponsored Links" sections of the web-page and prohibits unauthorized trademark use in the ad content. But despite requests from American Blind and others, Google refuses to discontinue its use of trademarks to trigger the ads.

=== History ===
The case began in Nov. 2003 when Google preemptively sought a judicial determination that its AdWords program did not infringe American Blind's trademarks. In May 2004, American Blind counter-sued Google for trademark infringement under the Lanham Act. Google subsequently filed a motion to dismiss in 2005, which was denied. Finally, Google filed a motion for summary judgement, which resulted in this decision.

== Dispute ==
American Blind alleged that Google infringed on its trademarks by enabling advertisers to key their ads to American Blind's marks. Google argued that American Blind's "claims were baseless, and that Google's trademark policies are perfectly reasonable and lawful." Under the Lanham Act, one infringes a trademark if (1) one uses the mark in commerce per 15 U.S.C. § 1114, 15 U.S.C. § 1125(a)(1) and (2) one employs the mark to deceive or induce consumer confusion per 15 U.S.C. § 1125(a)(1)(A), both without the consent of the mark's owner (15 U.S.C. § 1114). In support of its motion for summary judgment, Google argued that American Blind could prove neither element of its claim.

=== Trademark use ===
American Blind alleged that Google "used" its mark as defined in the Lanham Act (15 U.S.C. § 1127), based on precedent established in Playboy Enterprises, Inc. v. Netscape Communications Corp.—a case in which Netscape's keyword advertising was deemed to have used Playboy's trademark.

==== Google's defense ====
Google argued that, despite the Playboy v. Netscape holding, its use of trademarked keywords did not constitute use under the Lanham Act for two reasons. First, it did not place the mark on any of its goods or services per precedent set in Rescuecom Corp. v. Google Inc.; only advertisers do so. Second, the trademarked keywords are used internally and hence are akin to private thoughts. Specifically, courts prior to Playboy v. Netscape (e.g., 1-800-CONTACTS v. WhenU Inc.) have deemed private thoughts to be outside the scope of the Lanham Act.

==== Court's decision ====
The Court concluded that Google's use of American Blind's trademarks was a use per the Lanham Act, for two reasons. First it was bound by the precedent set in Playboy v. Netscape, in which Netscape's practice of keying searches to trademarked terms was deemed a use of Playboy's marks. The court notes that although use was not explicitly established in the Playboy ruling, the Playboy court focused heavily on the question of confusion, thereby implicitly signaling that use was established. Second, the Court pointed out that precedent set in other circuits also agree that keying is use. For example, in 800-JR Cigar, Inc. v. GoTo.com, Inc. the court concluded that "by accepting bids from those competitors of JR desiring to pay for prominence in search results, GoTo trades on the value of the marks", and hence "uses" the mark as defined in the Lanham Act.

=== Trademark confusion ===
American Blind alleged that "although Google claims publicly that its ads are conspicuous and differentiated from its genuine search results, this is not necessarily true." In support, American Blind presented the results of a survey in which "29% of respondents falsely believed...that the sponsored links were affiliated with American Blind." American Blind's allegation was relevant because Courts have looked to the Sleekcraft multi-factor test (established in AMF Inc. v. Sleekcraft Boats) to determine if there was a likelihood of confusion. American Blind's confusion analysis centered on the fourth Sleekcraft factor: evidence of actual confusion.

==== Google's defense ====
Google made two key arguments against American's Blind's allegation. First, it argued that, contrary to case law established in Playboy v. Netscape, the Sleekcraft factors are inapplicable in this case because they were meant for those offering the goods. Google argued that it isn't the one selling the goods—it just put up the advertisements. Second, Google argued that even if the Sleekcraft factors applied, there was no evidence of actual confusion. In particular, Google claimed that American Blind's survey of actual confusion was methodologically flawed: there was no control group and it studied only some of the trademarks in question.

==== Court's decision ====
Despite Google's argument against using the Sleekcraft factors, the court concluded it must use them per precedent established in Playboy v. Netscape, and that there were sufficient issues of material fact in question to preclude summary judgment. Specifically, the court held that some of the Sleekcraft factors may weigh in favor of American Blind. For example, it noted that there was some evidence of actual confusion, even if the degree to which it could be relied on was questionable. As another example, the court noted that the degree of consumer care exercised (Sleekcraft factor six) in the arena of online advertisements may be lower than in others, and hence may work in favor of American Blind.

== Settlement ==
Shortly after this decision, American Blind settled its dispute with Google in what some legal experts considered "a stunning victory for Google." Many saw the terms of the agreement as remarkably favorable for Google: it paid nothing to American Blind, which in turn agreed to not sue Google "so long as Google follows is current trademark policy." American Blind won no concessions in return from Google, and in fact was forced to make a $15k compensation to Google for negligence in the discovery process.

The reason for the settlement was controversial. American Blind's CEO Joel Levine stated that continuing litigation made little financial sense in light of American Airlines' dispute with Google over the same issue: "American Airline is more well-suited to take on Google than we are. We sell blinds and wallpaper and that's what we do best. We're not litigators." In contrast, attorneys for Google said that American Blind settled because "they had a terrible case and they decided it wasn't worth pursuing. They quit and went home."

== Impact ==
Had American Blind pursued the case and won at a later date, it seems likely that Google's advertising business would have been severely impacted. Indeed, AdWords revenue accounts for more than 98% of its annual revenue, with the percentage affected by trademark issues unknown. As Judge Fogel remarked in an earlier ruling: “The large number of businesses and users affected by Google’s AdWords program indicates that a significant public interest exists in determining whether the AdWords program violates trademark law."

The outcome of this case called into question the economic rationale for fighting Google on trademark issues. American Blind claimed that the action was justified by the fact that 50% of its revenue comes from web traffic. However, trademark expert Eric Goldman noted that, if anything, this case serves as an example of a lawsuit that "from the trademark owner's standpoint, absolutely makes no financial sense". In particular, he noted that American Blind incurred huge legal fees even though it was unlikely, in Goldman's opinion, to have suffered much profit loss due to diverted keyword advertising in the first place.

The fact that American Blind wasn't able to fight Google all the way left some wondering if anyone could challenge Google's use of trademarks. Legal expert Eric Goldman observed that trademark cases against Google have failed because the plaintiffs in those cases were small companies with few financial resources and relatively obscure brand names. For example, American Blind, Rescuecom, and Check-n-Go (all of which have disputed trademark issues with Google) are small to medium-sized companies that don't have particularly famous marks.

== See also ==
- Brookfield Communications, Inc. v. West Coast Entertainment Corp., 174 F.3d 1036 (9th Cir. 1999).
- Network Automation, Inc. v. Advanced Systems Concepts, Inc., 638 F.3d 1137 (9th Cir. 2011).
- Rosetta Stone v. Google Inc, 676 F.3d 144 (4th Cir. 2012)).
