= Website monetization =

Process of converting web traffic into revenue

Website monetization is the process of converting existing traffic being sent to a particular website into revenue. The most popular ways of monetizing a website are by implementing pay per click (PPC) and cost per impression/Cost per thousand impressions (CPI/CPM) advertising. Various ad networks facilitate a webmaster in placing advertisements on pages of the website to benefit from the traffic the site is experiencing.

The two most important metrics that matter to a web publisher looking to monetize their site is "Fill Rate", or the % of inventory where ads can be shown by a partner advertising network, and eCPM, which is the effective cost per thousand impression dollar amount that is paid out to the publisher for showing ads to their audience. CPM bidding is also offered through major advertising platforms such as Google Display Network, where viewable CPM (vCPM) ensures advertisers pay only for impressions that are actually visible to users.

Additionally, aside from typical ad display and various advertising generated revenue, some webmasters or site owners utilize Lead Generation to monetize Internet traffic to a website by creating leads or inquiries from submission forms or phone calls from interested consumers and then delivering those leads to a business seeking that type of inquiry.

== Pay per click advertising ==
Pay per click or PPC (also called Cost per click) is a marketing strategy put in place by search engines and various advertising networks such as Google Ads, where an advertisement, usually targeted by keywords or general topic, is placed on a relevant website or within search engine results. The advertiser then pays for every click that is made on the advertisement. This paid click activity fuels many revenue generating programs such as Google AdSense.

== Cost per impression advertising ==
Cost per impression (also called cost per mille) is a marketing strategy put in place by various advertising networks, where an advert is placed on a relevant website, usually targeted to the content sector of that site. The advertiser then pays for every time the advert is displayed to a user. Most systems will use a method known as cost per thousand impressions. If a website publisher charges $4.00 CPM, the advertiser is paying $4.00 for every 1,000 ad impressions (each time the ad is shown 1,000 times).

Most display ad setups are run through a third-party ad network, who take a cut of publishers' revenue.

== Banner advertising ==
Banner advertising consists of placing a graphical banner advertisement on a webpage. The role of this banner is to catch the eye of incoming traffic to the page, enticing readers to click the advertisement. This form of monetization is implemented by both affiliate programs and advertising networks. Banners originally just referred to advertisements of 468 x 60 pixels, but the term is now widely used to refer to all sizes of display advertising on the internet.

Typical web banner, sized 468×60 pixels.

=== Banner ad types ===
Banner ads come in various shapes and sizes and are sized according to pixel dimensions. Typical banner sizes include:

- Leaderboard 728 x 90
- Banner 468 x 60
- Skyscraper 120 x 600
- Top cube, NTV (next to video), IM (instant message) are widely used in 300x250 format
- Wide Skyscraper 160 x 600

Various Banner Ad Networks : BuySellAds.com, Blogads "BING ads by Microsoft",

== Affiliate programs ==
Affiliate programs are another common way to monetize existing website traffic. An affiliate who joins a business's program earns a commission on each sale of products from that business's catalog, provided the buyer was referred through the affiliate's website.

Affiliate marketing is frequently paired with search engine optimization (SEO) and content marketing to increase visibility and conversions. Affiliate sites publish reviews, comparisons, and guides that carry affiliate links, earning commissions when a reader completes a purchase or other qualifying action.

== Data monetization ==
Websites also generate valuable user data that can be monetized through various methods. Data generated by websites about their users can range from being demographics to in-market data (e.g. in-market for a car). This data can be sold through behavioral data exchanges and used by advertisers to target their online media campaigns. Websites can also generate revenue from their newsletter and on-site registrations programs by finding companies who are eager to reach the newsletters subscriber base. Another method of monetizing data is through the use of a survey wall instead of a paywall, asking users to take a short survey, rather than paying the website directly. The website is then paid by the survey wall operator (such as Survata).

== Paid subscriptions ==
Paid membership or 'continuity' programs are another way to monetize existing traffic. Examples of media membership sites are the Wall Street Journal and the New York Times. In the gaming world, Blizzard's World of Warcraft has millions of members. However, there are many other kinds of member sites that cover niche markets. Often people join to get access to content and expertise, or for community, such as discussion or bulletin boards. The term "continuity" is used because the goal is to develop income continuity. Instead of making a one-time sale of a product or service, the membership site brings new, repeated income every month. Besides news, other kinds of membership site include: health, fitness, marketing, copy writing, social media expertise, paper products, dating, paper crafting, scrap booking, coaching, writing and many other applications.

Experts in the membership site field say that "people come for content and stay for community." The challenge of a member site is to retain paying members. Some sites, like the New York Times, offers some content free and then charges a fee for more in-depth access, or access to special kinds of content. Some sites offer downloads of audio or video content, free graphics, free software that is only available to members with a Creative Market. Many sites also offer webinars to members. The webinars are often recorded as video, audio and also transcribed, creating more special content that is behind the pay wall.

Fees for membership vary widely. They can be billed monthly, annually, or even lifetime memberships. The digital access to the website is sometimes sold as part of a combination package that also includes physical product. For example, the Wall Street Journal offers a combination paper subscription, which is delivered to the subscriber's door, combined with access to the website and the smartphone app versions of the paper for about $140. Another site that sells membership to large corporations in the mobile phone industry, charges up to $12,000.00 a year for membership, which gives tech employees the right to pay to attend conferences on different aspects of the technology of cellular phones, and to access, on the website, recordings of past meetings. Business sites may offer a special information package, perhaps CDs or DVDs shipped to the new member as part of a package that includes membership.

Affiliate marketing is sometimes used to build membership in membership sites. Some sites continue to pay a percentage to the referring affiliate as long as the member continues paying monthly fees. Others pay a larger up-front fee. The page that marketers use a marketing or social media "funnel" to bring potential new paying members to is called a "squeeze" page.

== Donations ==
Websites can also ask visitors to donate money to them. Popular donations services such as PayPal offer different options for both personal fundraising and decreased cost for charitable organizations. This may be done using a pre-determined amount or by letting visitors enter their own donation amount.

== See also ==
- Advertising network
- Affiliate marketing
- Cost per impression
- In-image advertising
- In-text advertising
- List of advertising networks
- Pay per click
- Software monetization
- Video game monetization
