= Google LLC v Defteros =

Defamation case in Australia against Google

- Court: High Court of Australia
- Decided: 17 August 2022 (appeal); 30 April 2020 (initial)
- Citations: [2022] HCA (appeal) [2020] VSC 219 (initial)

Case history
- Appealed from: Supreme Court of Victoria

Keywords
- Defamation; Hyperlink; Search engine Google

Google LLC v Defteros was a defamation case in Australia brought by a lawyer against Google.

George Defteros is a lawyer, with much of his work being representing defendant gang members. Defteros successfully sued Google after it failed to take down a story that he said had defamed him, however, Google appealed the case to the High Court, represented by Johnson Winter Slattery.

On 30 April 2020, the Supreme Court of Victoria found in the case of Defteros v Google LLC [2020] VSC 219 that Google could be held liable for defamation in Australia. "The Court held that Google does publish webpages reached by clicking on hyperlinks within Google search results. The resolution of the publication issue was a necessary step to Google’s liability; Google succeeded on some defences and failed on others. Defteros was awarded $40,000." Google argued that the ruling would force it to censor the internet.

Upon appeal, on 17 August 2022, the High Court ruled that Google is not a publisher and the provision of a hyperlink merely facilitates access. A joint statement by Chief Justice Susan Kiefel and Justice Jacqueline Gleeson said, “In reality, a hyperlink is merely a tool which enables a person to navigate to another webpage."
