= Bananabay II =

Bananabay II (case reference: I ZR125/07), also known as Eis.de, is a 2011 decision of the Federal Court of Justice of Germany (BGH) relating to keyword advertising.

Relying on the case law of the Court of Justice of the European Union, including Google France and eis.de (C-91/09), the court held that the purchase of a sign identical to a third party’s trademark as an advertising keyword for identical goods or services does not constitute trademark infringement, provided that the advertisement does not use the trademark itself, is clearly separated from organic search results, and does not include a display URL referring to the trademark owner’s website.

== See also ==
- AdWords
