= Network Automation, Inc. v. Advanced Systems Concepts, Inc. =

Court case decided on March 8, 2011

- Court: United States Court of Appeals for the Ninth Circuit
- Full case name: Network Automation, Inc. v. Advanced Systems Concepts, Inc.
- Decided: March 8, 2011

Court membership
- Judges sitting: Stephen S. Trott, Kim McLane Wardlaw, & Michael W. Mosman.

Network Automation, Inc. v. Advanced Systems Concepts, Inc., 638 F.3d 1137 (9th Cir. 2011) was a court case decided on March 8, 2011, where the United States Court of Appeals for the Ninth Circuit ruled that the use of a competitor's trademark as an Internet search advertising keyword did not constitute trademark infringement. In the case, Network Automation advertised their own competing product in search queries that contained Advanced Systems Concepts' "ActiveBatch" trademark. In determining whether trademark infringement occurred, the court evaluated factors relevant to the likelihood of customer confusion outlined in AMF Inc. v. Sleekcraft Boats and concluded that confusion was unlikely.

== Background ==
Google and other Internet search engines and e-commerce sites have made search engine keyword advertising ubiquitous. Network Automation ("Network") and Advanced Systems Concepts ("Systems") both sold job scheduling and management software that were advertised on search engine results. Network's product was called Automate, and Systems' product was called ActiveBatch. Network decided to buy the keyword "ActiveBatch" so that when users searched for "ActiveBatch", Network's website would be displayed as a sponsored link in separate sections from search results, including Google Search and Microsoft Bing. Systems sent a letter to Network saying Network's usage of "ActiveBatch" as a keyword was infringing Systems' trademark rights. As a result, Network filed a lawsuit seeking declaratory judgement of non-infringement. Subsequently, Systems counterclaimed, and asserted trademark infringement under the Lanham Act, 15 U.S.C. § 1114 and therefore sought a preliminary injunction against Network's usage of "ActiveBatch".

== Trademark infringement background ==
An essential condition for trademark infringement is customer confusion. A 1979 Ninth Circuit Court case, AMF Inc. v. Sleekcraft Boats, identified eight factors in determining whether confusion between related goods was likely:

1. strength of the mark
2. proximity of the goods
3. similarity of the marks
4. evidence of actual confusion
5. marketing channels used
6. type of goods and the degree of care likely to be exercised by the purchaser
7. defendant's intent in selecting the mark
8. likelihood of expansion of the product lines

In 1999, another Ninth Circuit Court case, Brookfield Communications, Inc. v. West Coast Entertainment Corp., determined that of the eight Sleekcraft factors, three of them were the most significant for cases involving the Internet, which are known as the "Internet trinity" or "Internet troika".

1. the similarity of the marks
2. the relatedness of the goods and services offered
3. the simultaneous use of the Internet as a marketing channel

The Brookfield case also emphasized flexibility in applying the law to the Internet, a new, emerging technology:

We must be acutely aware of excessive rigidity when applying the law in the Internet context; emerging technologies require a flexible approach.

— Brookfield Communications, Inc. v. West Coast Entertainment Corp., 174 F.3d 1036, 1054 (9th Cir. 1999).

== Holding of the district court ==
The district court ordered a preliminary injunction against Network using the "ActiveBatch" mark. The district court analyzed the eight Sleekcraft factors and emphasized that the "Internet troika" from Brookfield were most significant, and found that they all favored Systems. The court's decision relied on Network usage of an identical mark, "ActiveBatch", to sell a product directly competing with Systems' product, and the fact both Network and Systems used the Internet to advertise. The district court also concluded that many of the other Sleekcraft factors were in favor Systems, including the degree of consumer care because "there is generally a low degree of care exercised by Internet consumers."

Network promptly appealed.

== Opinion of the Ninth Circuit ==
The United States Court of Appeals for the Ninth Circuit reversed the district court's decision in the case's reconsideration. It concluded that the likelihood of confusion was insufficient to support trademark infringement and therefore removed the injunction placed on Network. The Ninth Circuit clarified that in its ruling for Brookfield, it did not intend the "Internet troika" as the rigid test for trademark infringement on the Internet. Rather, it re-emphasized that the factors and principles considered in Sleekcraft are non-exhaustive and should be applied flexibly in the context of Internet commerce and other emerging technologies. The Ninth Circuit Court decided that the district court applied the Brookfield factors too rigidly, and emphasized flexibility over rigidity for the "Internet troika" from Brookfield.

Relevant factors the Ninth Circuit considered are:

1. the strength of the mark
2. evidence of actual confusion
3. the type of goods and degree of care exercised by consumers
4. the appearance of the advertisements and their surrounding context on search engine results

=== Strength of the Mark ===
The Ninth Circuit Court concluded that this factor favored Systems, since the mark "ActiveBatch" was the name of Systems' product, and also a federally registered trademark. Any consumer searching for "ActiveBatch" were more likely to be looking for the specific product and not a category of goods.

=== Proximity of Goods ===
The products from Systems and Network were virtually interchangeable, so the district court considered this factor in isolation, and found it in favor of Systems. However, the Ninth Circuit Court concluded that this factor should be considered with other factors such as the labeling and appearance of the advertisements, and the consumers' degree of care. The federal court concluded that the district court weighed this factor too heavily, without considering the fact that the two companies were direct competitors.

=== Similarity of Marks ===
The test for similarity of two marks compares the sight, sound and meaning of the marks. This comparison is impossible when two distinct trademarks do not exist. The district court incorrectly treated the "ActiveBatch" keyword bought by Network, and the ActiveBatch product from Systems as two different marks. The federal court concluded that the "ActiveBatch" keyword purchased by Network is the same trademark as of the ActiveBatch product, so a similarity comparison was not relevant.

=== Evidence of Actual Confusion ===
Evidence of actual confusion is not necessary to prove likelihood of consumer confusion so the Ninth Circuit Court agreed with the district court in that this factor was given no weight.

=== Type of Goods and Degree of Care ===
The federal court found that the district court incorrectly concluded that this factor was in Systems' favor on the fact that in the 1999 Brookfield case, Internet users exercised a low degree of care. Internet users no longer exhibit a low degree of care for many situations. The Ninth Circuit Court also concluded that the type and cost of the product affects the degree of care by the consumer. A consumer of expensive, business software is more likely to understand search engines and sponsored advertisements, and thus be less likely to be confused.

=== Marketing Channels ===
The federal court decided that this factor is less important when the marketing channel is not obscure. Internet advertising was becoming ubiquitous, so sharing the same marketing channel does not reveal any information on the likelihood of consumer confusion. The district court incorrectly weighed this factor in favor of Systems.

=== Defendant's Intent ===
The Ninth Circuit Court concluded that the district court incorrectly considered this factor in isolation and presumed that Network knowingly used a similar trademark to deceive consumers. Since Network was providing a product in competition with ActiveBatch, Network was not trying to mislead consumers, but to inform them of other choices of comparable products.

=== Likelihood of Expansion of the Product Lines ===
The district court correctly disregarded this factor, since the likelihood of expansion does not apply when the two companies are direct competitors.

=== Other Relevant Factors ===
The eight Sleekcraft factors were never meant to be an exhaustive list. The appearance of the advertisements were also an important factor. The district court correctly analyzed the advertisement texts, and concluded that the text did not clearly identify the source, which could have led to consumer confusion. However, the Ninth Circuit Court found that the advertisements for both Google Search and Microsoft Bing were segregated from the search results, and were labeled as "sponsored links", so confusion was less likely.

== Conclusion ==
This was an important case for keyword advertising since the opinion strongly suggested that keywords involving trademarks were not infringing. In addition, the opinion of the Ninth Circuit Court suggested that previous court case rulings involving trademark infringement on the internet depended too rigidly on specific factors, and did not consider the whole picture in the context of new emerging technologies. The results of this case will make it more difficult for future plaintiffs complaining about trademark infringement with keyword advertising.
