= Michael Musandu =

Zimbabwean computer scientist (born 1996)

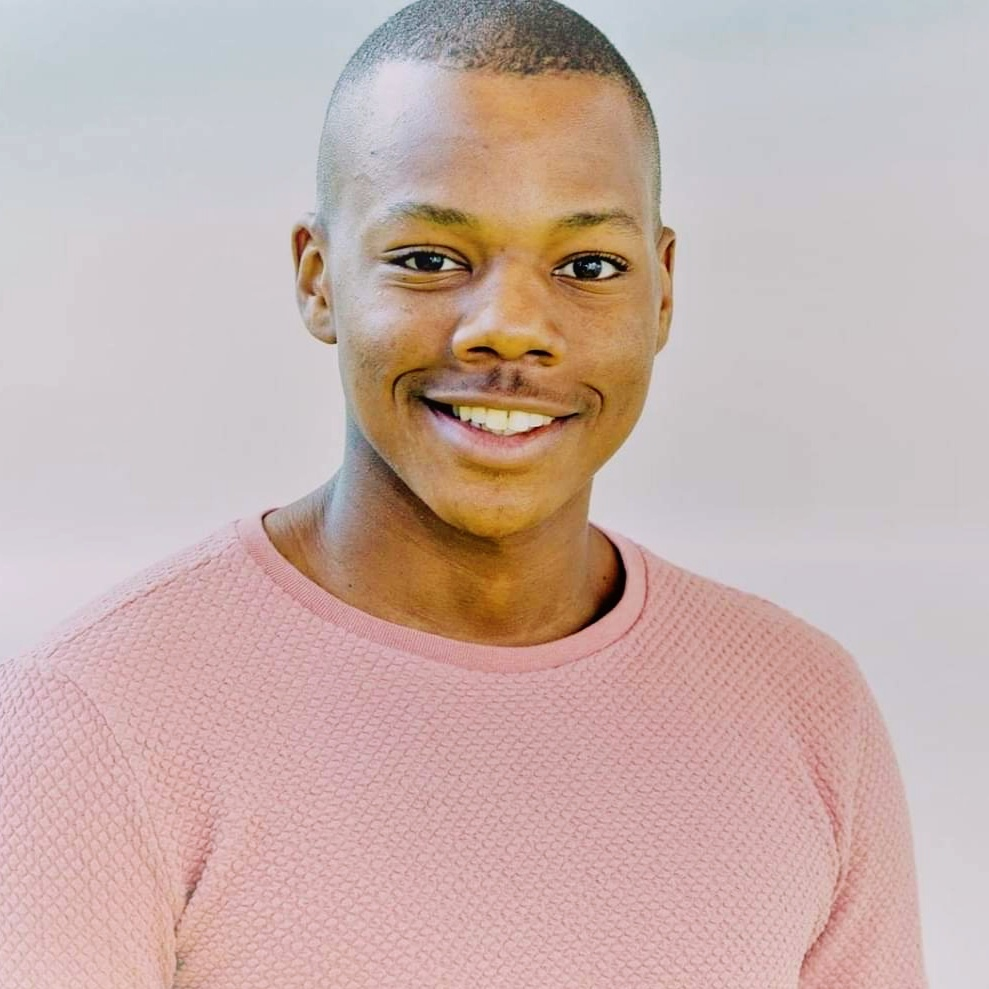
- Born: Michael Musandu; 14 February 1996 (age 30); Harare, Zimbabwe
- Education: Vrije Universiteit Amsterdam, Utrecht University
- Occupations: Entrepreneur, Computer Scientist
- Known for: Founder of Vested AI, Lalaland.ai

Michael Musandu (born 14 February 1996) is a technology entrepreneur and the founder and CEO of Lalaland.ai, an Amsterdam-based fashion-tech startup that uses generative artificial intelligence (generative AI) to create hyperrealistic digital models for fashion brands.

== Early life and education ==
Musandu was born in Zimbabwe and raised in South Africa. In 2018, he completed a Bachelor of Science (BSc) in Computer Science at Vrije Universiteit Amsterdam (VU Amsterdam), specializing in Technology Entrepreneurship and completing a thesis titled "Enhancing Hologram Projection Systems Using Automatic Gesture Recognition." In 2019, he pursued a Master of Science (MS) in Artificial Intelligence at Utrecht University, where he was recognized for his work with awards such as the Breaking Science prize.

== Career ==
Musandu began his career as President of ESN VU Amsterdam from July 2017 to July 2018, where he led initiatives to support cultural exchange and engagement for international students at Vrije Universiteit Amsterdam.

In February 2019, he founded Lalaland.ai in Amsterdam, Netherlands, where leads the company as CEO, focusing on AI-driven fashion solutions for digital product creation and sales enhancement for brands. In June 2021, Lalaland was selected as the only Dutch startup in Google's highly competitive Black Founders Fund, securing funding, Google Ad Grants, Cloud credits, and mentorship to support Musandu's vision of diversity and innovation in fashion tech. Musandu was included in EW's 30 Under 30 list, MT Sprout's Inclusive 30 as the Best Young Entrepreneur of 2021, and MT Sprout's 25 Under 25.

Later, in September 2021, Musandu joined the Sigma Squared Society, a global community for young founders under 26. In 2022, Lalaland won the Tommy Hilfiger Fashion Frontier Challenge. In June 2022, Lalaland secured €2.1 million in a pre-Series A funding round led by Orange Wings, Unknown Group, and angel investors.

In 2023, Musandu was listed on the Forbes Europe 30 Under 30 for his work in technology and innovation.
