= Network Automation =

Network Automation (Software Company)
- Type: Private
- Founded: Los Angeles, California (2004)
- Fate: Acquired
- Headquarters: 3530 Wilshire Blvd., Suite 1800, Los Angeles, California
- Key people: Dustin Snell, founder and chief executive officer; Marty Gadzinowski, director of sales, Automate
- Products: AutoMate and AutoMate BPA Server Software
- Parent: HelpSystems
- Website: NetworkAutomation.com

Network Automation was a Los Angeles–based software company that developed business process automation software designed to simplify repetitive information technology processes on desktop computers and servers. The company was acquired by Minneapolis, Minnesota–based HelpSystems, and is now operated as a standalone division.

== History ==
In July 2004, Dustin Snell launched Network Automation, Inc. in Los Angeles, California. In September 2012, after two years as Chief Software Architect, Snell resumed his role as CEO.

In April 2014, the company was acquired by Minneapolis, Minnesota–based HelpSystems, an IT software company offering solutions in the areas of systems and network management, business intelligence, security and compliance, for IBM i, Unix, Linux and Windows environments.

== Products ==
The company’s main products were AutoMate and AutoMate BPA Server, which ran on Windows operating systems. The products were designed to simplify repetitive IT tasks via a drag and drop GUI interface, without requiring end user coding. Functions included job scheduling, automated FTP, batch processing, automated backups, scripting, automated testing, event log monitoring and automated reporting.

- AutoMate – AutoMate software presented a GUI-based interface for automating IT processes. The base version was called AutoMate Professional, and an enhanced version was called AutoMate Premium.
- AutoMate BPA Server – AutoMate BPA Server software provided centralized management of process management across the entire enterprise. The base version was called AutoMate BPA Server Standard Edition, and an enhanced version supporting more than 10 machines was known as AutoMate BPA Server Enterprise Edition.

2012 enhancements included support for Windows Azure and Amazon Web Services. Third party applications such as Microsoft CRM could also be integrated.

== Landmark legal ruling ==
Network Automation, Inc. v. Advanced Systems Concepts, Inc. was a California court case decided in favor of Network Automation on March 8, 2011. The Ninth Circuit Court verdict protected the rights of companies to use strategic keywords in Internet search advertising.

== Awards ==
AutoMate won awards from Windows IT Pro, CNET and NetworkWorld and was named as the "Best Scripting Tool" by Redmondmag.

The company was named to the 2009, 2011 and 2012 Inc. 5000 as one of the fastest growing software companies in the US.
