= Search advertising =

Placing online advertisements on webpages

In Internet marketing, search advertising is a method of placing online advertisements on web pages that show results from search engine queries. Through the same search-engine advertising services, ads can also be placed on Web pages with other published content.

Search advertisements are targeted to match key search terms (called keywords) entered on search engines. This targeting ability has contributed to the attractiveness of search advertising for advertisers. Consumers will often use a search engine to identify and compare purchasing options immediately before making a purchasing decision. The opportunity to present consumers with advertisements tailored to their immediate buying interests encourages consumers to click on search ads instead of unpaid search results, which are often less relevant. For the online user, Sponsored Search Advertisement offers highly relevant search results which are based on the consumer’s own queries and, thus, they are considered less intrusive than banner advertisements or pop-ups advertising. In addition, Sponsored Search Advertisement reduces online user search costs and increases the accessibility to useful information within a limited time frame. Consequently, Sponsored Search Advertisement has become an important element of online users browsing and information searching experiences on the Web. Search advertising is an alternative to SEO and SEM.

== Origins ==
Web advertising before 1998 consisted of banner advertisements generally priced by the number of impressions delivered (i.e., Cost-Per-milli (CPM) pricing). In 1997, Yahoo first delivered banner advertisements based on search queries at its website. GoTo.com (renamed Overture in 2001, and acquired by Yahoo! in 2003) created the first sponsored search auction, and Google’s first sponsored search auction followed in 2002.

== Keywords ==
Search advertising is sold and delivered on the basis of keywords. The user of a search engine enters keywords to make queries. A keyword may consist of more than one word. The user interested in the product or service searches using a specific keyword or search term which lets them interact with advertiser's website.

Search engines conduct running auctions to sell ads according to bids received for keywords and relative relevance of user keywords to ads in the inventory. The keyword “home mortgage refinancing" is more expensive than one that is in less demand, such as “used bicycle tires.” Profit potential of the keywords also plays into bids for ads that advertisers want displayed when the keywords are searched by the user. For example, "used book" may be a popular keyword but may have low profit potential and the advertiser bids will reflect that.

Search engines build indexes of Web pages using a Web crawler. When the publisher of a Web page arranges with a search engine firm to have ads served up on that page, the search engine applies their indexing technology to associate the content of that page with keywords. Those keywords are then fed into the same auctioning system that is used by advertisers to buy ads on both search engine results pages. Advertising based on keywords in the surrounding content or context is referred to as Contextual advertising. This is usually less profitable than search advertising which is based on user intent expressed through their keywords.

Advertisers can choose whether to buy ads on search result pages (search advertising), published content pages (contextual advertising), or both. Bids on the same keywords are usually higher in search advertising than in contextual advertising.

In 2013, the Tenth Circuit Court of Appeals held in Lens.com, Inc. v. 1-800 Contacts, Inc. that online contact lens seller Lens.com did not commit trademark infringement when it purchased search advertisements using competitor 1-800 Contacts' federally registered 1800 CONTACTS trademark as a keyword. In August 2016, the Federal Trade Commission filed an administrative complaint against 1-800 Contacts alleging, among other things, that its search advertising trademark enforcement practices have unreasonably restrained competition in violation of the FTC Act. 1-800 Contacts has denied all wrongdoing and is scheduled to appear before an FTC administrative law judge in April 2017.

== Metrics ==
Search advertising activities can be measured in five ways:

CPM: Cost per thousand viewers was the original method used for pricing online advertisements. CPM remains the most common method for pricing banner ads.

CTR: Click-through rates measure the number of times an ad is clicked as a percentage of views of the Web page on which the ad appears. Banner ads have CTRs that are generally 0.5 percent or less. In comparison, individual search engine ads can have CTRs of 10 percent, even though they appear alongside organic search results and competing paid search advertisements.

CPA: Cost per action quantifies costs for completing specified activities such as attracting a new customer or making a sale. Affiliate networks operate on a CPA basis. CPA systems function most effectively when sales cycles are short and easily tracked. Longer sales cycles rely on exposure to multiple types of ads to create brand awareness and purchasing interest before a sale is made. Longer sales cycles and sales requiring multiple customer contacts can be difficult to track, leading to a reluctance by publishers to participate in CPA programs beyond initial lead generation.

CPC: Cost per click tracks the cost of interacting with a client or potential client. In traditional marketing, CPC is viewed as a one-way process of reaching target audiences through means such as direct mail, radio ads and television ads. Search advertising provides opportunities for two-way contacts through web-based chat, Internet-based calls, call-back requests or mailing list sign-ups. There are some guidelines to establish minimum acceptable counting procedure for clicks. Each and every click has a life cycle which is known as click referral cycle. It comprises four stages: Initiated click, Measured click, Received click and Resolved click.

TM: Total minutes is a metric being used by Nielsen/NetRatings to measure total time spent on a Web page rather than the number of Web page views. On July 10, 2007, Nielsen announced that they would be relying on TM as their primary metric for measuring Web page popularity, due to changes in the way Web pages provide content through audio and video streaming and by refreshing the same page without totally reloading it.

Methodological questions regarding the use of total minutes for search advertising include how to account for Internet users that keep several browser windows open simultaneously, or who simply leave one window open unattended for long periods of time. Another question involves tracking total minutes on HTML pages that are stateless and do therefore do not generate server-side data on the length of time that they are viewed.

== Campaign management ==
Search engine advertisements are purchased on the basis of keywords. Ad buyers engage in running actions for keywords, with popular keywords costing several dollars per click through.

Search engines use algorithms to determine the position of ads according to their quality score, which is determined by several factors, including click through rates. In general ads with poor quality score and click through rates can be pushed down to the bottom of the first page of search results or onto subsequent pages. Even though advertisers are only paying for click throughs, the algorithms assigning ad positions based on ad popularity provide incentives for optimizing keyword selection and other cost control measures. Without cost control measures, it is possible for ad buyers to spend twenty five to fifty percent of their ad budget ineffectively.

Cost control measures can include:

- Campaigns can begin slowly, so as to test the effectiveness of keywords and ad texts. It can take three months of testing before a campaign is ready to scale up. Beginning campaigns can spend US$20–$40 per day, whereas major campaigns can exceed US$1000 per day. Multiple campaigns can be run alongside each other.
- Negative keywords can be used to exclude search queries that do not relate to services and/or products advertised. A seller of replacement windows for buildings, for example, could use the negative keywords ‘software’ or ‘programs’ to avoid their ads appearing in response to search queries for information about Microsoft Windows software.
- Word order within keyword combinations can have an effect on click through rates. Word order in buying ads according to keywords can be controlled through the use of quotation marks. Continuing the above example from the perspective of a seller of replacement windows, the keyword “replacement window” may have a higher click through rate than “windows replacement” or for related keyword combinations where syntax is not specified and that could be associated with Microsoft Windows software rather than windows for buildings.
- Broad search means that an ad is served up in response to any search query that contains the keyword, regardless of any other words that may have been used in the search query. Eliminating broad search can be helpful in cases where there are a large number of potential keywords or where the advertiser seeks to keep ad spending at a minimum. A replacement window company located in Trenton, New Jersey could eliminate broad search in favor of location-specific keywords such as “replacement windows Trenton” and other locations within their market area. Each search engine has its own procedures for controlling broad search options for individual keywords.
- It takes time to identify and select potential keywords. Rather than bidding on a small number of popular keywords, advertisers can expand their keyword lists to more than 200 and seek to include keywords that their competitors are not utilizing. Keywords that are less sought after are cheaper. To identify keyword options, enter ‘keyword tool’ into a search engine. The use of competitors' trademarks as keywords has been controversial in the U.S. and around the world.
- The use of one own's trademark as a keyword has been controversial as well, but research shows that there are plenty of advantages in using that method not just for dominating search results pages with SEO and PPC and preventing competitors from taking advantage of it, but also for increasing the number of clicks the brand is getting; the combined clicks from SEO and PPC would exceed the clicks of SEO even if the brand's SEO has the first position for its brand keywords.
- Search advertising campaigns can produce immediate results—but they often need immediate attention. Poorly performing ads need to be pulled, keyword lists adjusted, and bid amounts modified to prevent over-spending.
- Perform market research with search analytics services in order to identify market trends and opportunities. These services often reveal what keywords are profitable for other websites in your target market. In addition, they show seasonal and emerging keywords allowing you to plan a more timely marketing campaign.

== See also ==
- Dynamic Keyword Insertion
- Online advertising
- Web search engine
- Keyword Advertising
- Google Ads
