= WhenU SaveNow =

- Developer: WhenU
- Stable release: 4.0
- Operating system: Microsoft Windows
- Type: Adware

WhenU Save/SaveNow (commonly referred to simply as WhenU or SaveNow), developed by the company WhenU, is a piece of advertising software generally considered to be adware or spyware.

== Overview ==
The program delivers advertisements, compares shopping results and other offers to users' computers, and tracks their browsing habits. WhenU is typically installed with other applications, ostensibly to support the free existence of those applications.

WhenU cannot be installed without a user reading a disclosure screen and clicking "I accept" or "Next" to give consent, sometimes unknowingly. This model is similar to previous software known as Gator from the company now known as Claria Corporation.

== Security ==
Although WhenU's advertising software declares that it poses no risk of harm to users' computers, it is considered by many to be unwelcome because it serves pop-up advertisements and slows down the computer.

Lavasoft's Ad-Aware and Computer Associates' PestPatrol briefly de-listed WhenU as an adware target in February 2005. Why these two programs stopped detecting WhenU while continuing to target other similar adware programs has led to some speculation of their reasoning. WhenU was added back to Lavasoft's detection list a month later.

TRUSTe has included WhenU's advertising software in its whitelist as certified software.

== See also ==
- 1-800 Contacts, Inc. v. WhenU.com, Inc.
