= Negative keyword =

In pay-per-click advertising (PPC), negative keywords prevent advertisements from displaying for particular keyword phrases. The process of adding in negative keywords to a paid search account is an important part of the optimization process, as it allows for eliminating search queries which are unlikely to convert into a sale. For example, an individual may want to advertise for "hotel in Toronto," but does not want to display ads for the keyword "hotel jobs in Toronto." In this instance, the term "jobs" would be added as a negative keyword. There are few automated tools to predict the negative keywords and make the process simpler. Taking help from tools helps to save time and avoid the possibility of human error.

Negative keywords are often necessary for paid search campaigns that contain keywords on either broad match or phrase match. These match types will display ads for additional search queries (i.e. search queries other than the actual keyword that was added to the account). Thus, removing irrelevant terms often becomes necessary. A common use is to add general negative keywords such as "pictures" or the aforementioned "jobs" to a negative keyword list that is applied to multiple campaigns.

An additional use for negative keywords is to funnel traffic to the highest-converting and optimized campaign or ad group for a particular search query. For example, if an advertiser is marketing laptop and desktop computers, and has ad copy that is specific to each, he may notice that some searchers who are searching for laptops are being shown desktop ads and vice versa. Negative keywords can be used to make sure that each searcher is shown the most relevant ad copy that is most likely to convert into a sale.

== See also ==
- Stopword
