= Lalaland (company) =

Dutch tech startup

- Industry: Fashion-Tech
- Founded: 2019
- Founder: Michael Musandu, Ugnius Rimsa
- Fate: Acquired by Browzwear, July 2025
- Headquarters: Amsterdam, Netherlands
- Website: lalaland.ai

Lalaland is an Amsterdam-Based Dutch tech startup that creates artificial intelligence based virtual models for e-commerce, founded in 2019 by Michael Musandu and Ugnius Rimsa. In 2022 it would win the Tommy Hilfiger Fashion Frontier Challenge. Then in 2022 its founders would join the European Forbes 30 under 30 list as well as Levi Strauss & Co. announcing a partnership with the company.

== History ==
The startup was co-founded in 2019 by Michael Musandu and Ugnius Rimsa. Lalaland states that the concept of creating AI based synthetic, full-body virtual supermodels is aimed to replace the traditional human models to reduce cost to vendors and to increase diversity in product representation.

In April 2020, Lalaland received a pre-seed funding from Amsterdam-based venture capital fund ASIF Ventures. In May 2020, Lalaland won the 15th Philips Innovation Award. In June 2021, the startup received €350,000 funding from Google under its program to fund the ventures initiated by the people of color.

In January 2022, Lalaland won the Tommy Hilfiger Fashion Frontier Challenge, which includes a prize of €100,000 and mentorship opportunities.

In June 2022 Lalaland raised €2.1M in a new pre-Series-A round of funding.

In March 2022 Michael and Ugnius made it to the European Forbes 30 under 30 list in the retail and e-commerce list, which identifies entrepreneurs under the age of 30 who, the Forbes page notes, are “reinventing how we shop, both online and offline.” The same month, Levi Strauss & Co. announced a partnership with the aim for later that year, to test AI-generated models to supplement human models, increasing the number and diversity of their models for their products in a sustainable way.
