= Google v Louis Vuitton =

European trademark case (2010)

- European Court of Justice

Submitted 3 June 2008 Decided 23 March 2010
- Full case name: Google France SARL and Google Inc. v Louis Vuitton Malletier SA
- Case: C-236/08
- ECLI: ECLI:EU:C:2010:159
- Case type: Reference for a preliminary ruling
- Chamber: Grand Chamber

Ruling
- Search engine operators do not infringe trademark rights if they allow advertisers to use a competitor's trademark as a keyword

Court composition
- President; V. Skouris
- Judge Rapporteur; M. Ilešič
- Advocate General; Miguel Poiares Maduro

Google France SARL and Google Inc. v Louis Vuitton Malletier SA (C-236/08), also known as Google v Louis Vuitton was a landmark decision in which the European Court of Justice (ECJ) held that search engines operators such as Google do not themselves infringe trademark rights if they allow advertisers to use a competitor's trademark as a keyword.

== Facts ==
Vuitton has the Community trademark 'Vuitton' as well as the French trademarks 'Louis Vuitton' and 'LV'.

In 2003, Vuitton detected that if internet users entered his trademark terms into Google's search engine, they would be directed to websites selling imitations of Vuitton's products, under the heading of 'sponsored links'.

Additionally, Google enabled the advertisers to use simultaneously with Vuitton's trademarks, expressions suggesting counterfeit products, such as 'imitation' and 'copy'. Thus, Vuitton brought a proceeding against Google, attempting to ascertain that it had infringed Vuitton's trademarks.

In 2005, the Regional Court of Paris rendered a decision determining that Google was guilty due to the infringement of Vuitton's trademarks. Subsequently, on appeal, the Court of appeal in Paris, confirmed the same outcome.

However, Google brought an appeal on a point of law to the Cassation court against the last judgement. Consequently, the French Court of Cassation stayed the proceedings and asked the CJEU for further clarification on certain aspects essential to decide the case. Thus, it referred the following questions for a preliminary ruling:

1. Must Article 5(1)(a) and (b) of [Directive 89/104] and Article 9(1)(a) and (b) of [Regulation No 40/94] be interpreted as meaning that a provider of a paid referencing service who makes available to advertisers keywords reproducing or imitating registered trademarks and arranges by the referencing agreement to create and favourably display, on the basis of those keywords, advertising links to sites offering infringing goods is using those trademarks in a manner which their proprietor is entitled to prevent?

2. In the event that the trademarks have a reputation, may the proprietor oppose such use under Article 5(2) of [Directive 89/104] and Article 9(1)(c) of [Regulation No 40/94]?

3. In the event that such use does not constitute a use which may be prevented by the trademark proprietor under [Directive 89/104] or [Regulation No 40/94], may the provider of the paid referencing service be regarded as providing an information society service consisting of the storage of information provided by the recipient of the service, within the meaning of Article 14 of [Directive 2000/31], so that that provider cannot incur liability until it has been notified by the trademark proprietor of the unlawful use of the sign by the advertiser?

== Judgement ==
The Court found that signs corresponding to trademarks were used in an internet referencing service through the usage of keywords, without consent of the trademark proprietors. Such keywords were chosen and accepted by clients of the referencing service provider. The Court found that Article 5(1)(a) and (b) of Directive 89/104 and Article 9(1)(a) and (b) of Regulation No 40/94 allow proprietors of trade marks to prohibit any third parties from using signs identical or similar to their trademarks for goods or services. This triggers viewing of advertising links which display goods identical to those registered under protected trade marks. The Court interprets that this triggering falls under the scope of the overall scheme of Directive 89/104 and as such affects the functions of the trademark. As such, it held that by application of Article 5(1)(a) of Directive 89/104 and Article (9)(1)(a) of Regulation No 40/95, the proprietor of a trademark can prohibit a third party from using signs identical to the trade mark in use in the course of trade of similar goods, namely through the use of keywords in a referencing service provider.

The use of keywords is considered to affect the course of trade. In the words of the Court:

From the advertiser's point of view, the selection of a keyword identical with a trademark has the object and effect of displaying an advertising link to the site on which he offers his goods or services for sale. Since the sign selected as a keyword is the means used to trigger that ad display, it cannot be disputed that the advertiser indeed uses it in the context of commercial activity and not as a private matter. With regard, next, to the referencing service provider, it is common ground that it is carrying out a commercial activity with a view to economic advantage when it stores as keywords, for certain of its clients, signs which are identical with trademarks and arranges for the display of ads on the basis of those keywords.

The Court concludes on a first instance that a referencing system is not necessarily involved in use in the course of trade according to the wording of Directive 89/104. However, its relation to the trademarked products can be established through a "relation to goods or services", as Vuitton's trade marks appeared in advertisements under a heading of" sponsored links". Although Google stated that in the absence of the mention of a sign in the actual ad no trademark rights were being violated, the Court held that the list in the Directive should be incorporated as to include modern electronic commerce and that, in that context, referencing service providers allow advertisers to choose identical signs as keywords in order to invite internet users to enter words as search terms to then click the links displayed and also the advertising links. If these sponsored links are provided above the regular list of results, internet users are more likely to click them, as they are listed first, as alternatives to the original Vuitton bags. [68] As such, it follows that the use by an advertiser of a sign identical with a trademark as a keyword falls within the concept of use "in relation to goods or services".

The Court concluded by stating that Louis Vuitton has the right to prohibit an advertiser from advertising on Google by using keywords identical with its trademark without their consent. However, "an internet referencing service provider which stores, as a keyword, a sign identical with a trade mark and organises the display of advertisements on the basis of that keyword does not use that sign within the meaning of Directive 89/104 and Regulation No 40/95." The conclusion of the Court's judgement relied on the concept of "active role" of the internet referencing service provider, regarding "knowledge or control over the data store. If the internet servicing provider has not played such a role, than it cannot be held liable for the data which it has stored at the request of an advertiser, unless it failed to act expeditiously to remove or disable access to the data concerned."

== Substance ==
Pierro Gode (vice-president at LVMH), considers that "This decision represents a critical step towards the clarification of the rules governing online advertising, of which LVMH is one of the foremost clients. "As the world's leading luxury group, with more brands actively engaged with the internet than any other luxury company, we are committed to working with all parties, including Google, to eradicate illicit online practices and to promote a framework that fosters the continued growth of the digital economy."

Fiona McBride, trademark lawyer at Withers & Rogers, described the ECJ ruling about the origin of an ad as "perplexing". She said it seemed to be unnecessarily introducing "a requirement of element or doubt as to the origin of goods and services which is not relevant for determining the infringement of a registered trademark". "This is a setback for brand owners and seriously limits the scope of their trade mark rights when it comes to challenging use of their trade marks in online advertising," added McBride. "Only rarely will the internet user be unable to ascertain the origin of the goods and services and it will therefore be easy for advertisers to circumvent the law and use third party trademarks as keywords. This means that advertisers can secure a commercial advantage by piggy-backing on the reputation of the trademarks."

The issues arising on whether the facts of this case constitute a trademark infringement are debatable amongst the national European courts regarding operator responsibility for comparative trademark use. But the issue itself, in the perspective of advocate-general Miguel Poiares Maduro poses no real issue, as he previously stated that "Google has not committed a trademark infringement by allowing advertisers to select, in AdWords, keywords corresponding to trademarks." He considers that the use of the algorithm that creates and organizes Googles advertising "cannot therefore be considered as being a use made in relation to goods or services identical or similar to those covered by the trademarks. Similarly, advertisers themselves do not commit a trademark infringement by selecting in Adwords keywords corresponding to trademarks," and in no way should it be construed that due to the fact that Google displays certain types of advertisement when a specific search term is inputted it means that it wants to affect companies sales. Users are fully aware that several search results will be presented outside of the owner of the Trademark, and the customers will make an assessment of the origins of the product and consequently their purchase decision on the content of the website rather than on the display of the ad.
