= In-text advertising =

Expanded Vibrant Media advertisement window associated with the in-text term "PC" (double-underlined).

In-text advertising is a form of contextual advertising where specific keywords within the text of a web-page are matched with advertising and/or related information units.

== Description ==
Although contextual advertising in general refers to the inclusion of advertisements adjacent to relevant online context (e.g., Google AdSense), in-text advertising places hyperlinks directly into the text of the webpage. In-text advertising is commonly available from In-Text Ad Networks like Kontera using technology such as IntelliTXT, or offered by publishers using Ad Serving technology from PowerLinks Media.

== Advertising Model ==
In text advertising commonly works on a pay-per-click (PPC) model, which means that each time a website visitor clicks on an In-text ad, the website’s owner gets paid by the advertiser. Other models include cost per impression (CPM), cost per action CPA and cost per play CPP for multimedia content ads (also known as Pay Per Play (PPP))

== Criticism ==
The use of this type of advertising in news and journalism websites has been criticized by journalism ethics counselors as "ethically problematic at the least and potentially quite corrosive of journalistic quality and credibility." However, publishers such as the Indianapolis Star who use in-text advertising have reported that despite early objections by some readers, such complaints have "tapered off".

== See also ==
- In-image advertising
