= In-image advertising =

In-image advertising is a form of contextual advertising where specific images on a website are matched with related advertisements.

== Description ==
In-image advertising uses “data about the image, its tags, and the surrounding content to match images with ads that are contextually relevant.” Once a website owner integrates the scripts onto their publishing systems, site visitors can move their mouse over the images or look at an image for a certain amount of time to reveal an ad.

Most in-image advertising have the following characteristics:

1. When a user mouses over an image on a website, a small overlay on the lower segment of the image appears.
2. The overlay can be closed out by the user.
3. Some in-image ad technologies produce a pop-up box when visitors mouse over images.
4. Clicking on the text of an in-image advertisement directs users to a new page.

In-image ads were first introduced by GumGum in February, 2008, as a way for publishers to pay image licensing fees on an ad-supported basis. Picad Media, which launched its "in-picture ad network" in September, 2008, was later renamed Image Space Media and was acquired by Vibrant Media in January, 2012.

Since the turn of the decade as the web has shifted towards one with increasingly visual content new companies have emerged such as Znaptag and Advant Technology Ltd. In June 2014 NetSeer introduced InImageLinks, a service that embeds contextual text and display ads within editorial images and addresses challenges associated with new Viewable Impression metrics.

https://www.seedtag.com/en/ entered the market in 2014, with the next generation of intelligent, contextually targeted In-Image advertising and a range of new polite user centric formats. Originally in Spain, Seedtag have seen rapid growth across Europe and LATM and are now one of the leading players in the sector, raising over $250 million in funding.

== Advertising Model ==
In-Image advertising works on a cost per click (CPC) or cost per thousand impressions (CPM) model.

== See also ==
- In-text advertising
