= Brookfield Communications, Inc. v. West Coast Entertainment Corp. =

- Court: United States Court of Appeals for the Ninth Circuit
- Full case name: Brookfield Communications, Inc. v. West Coast Entertainment Corp.
- Argued: March 10 1999
- Decided: April 22 1999
- Citations: 174 F.3d 1036; 50 U.S.P.Q.2d 1545; 99 Cal. Daily Op. Serv. 2899; 1999 Daily Journal D.A.R. 3779

Case history
- Prior history: Brookfield Communications Inc. v. West Coast Entertainment Corp., No. 98-cv-09074-CM-AJW (C.D. Cal. Nov. 30, 1998) (denying ex parte motion for temporary restraining order, denying ex parte motion for order to show cause regarding preliminary injunction).
- Subsequent history: Brookfield Communications Inc. v. West Coast Entertainment Corp., 1999 U.S. Dist. LEXIS 23251 (C.D. Cal. Jun. 10, 1999) (ruling on summary judgment motions).

Holding
- Brookfield has a valid, protectable trademark in "MovieBuff" and West Coast's use of the domain name moviebuff.com would cause a likelihood of confusion. West Coast can not use the term "MovieBuff" in the HTML metatags of its web site. Although there is no likelihood of confusion, the use of "MovieBuff" in the metatags could cause an initial interest confusion.

Court membership
- Judges sitting: William Cameron Canby, Jr., Diarmuid Fionntain O'Scannlain, Kim McLane Wardlaw

Case opinions
- Majority: Diarmuid Fionntain O'Scannlain

Laws applied
- 15 U.S.C. § 1114,§ 1125(a), (Lanham Act)

The case Brookfield Communications, Inc. v. West Coast Entertainment Corporation, 174 F.3d 1036 (9th Cir. 1999), heard by the United States Court of Appeals for the Ninth Circuit, established that trademark infringement could occur through the use of trademarked terms in the HTML metatags of web pages when initial interest confusion was likely to result.

== Background ==
In 1993 Brookfield Communications started selling software that provided customers with a searchable database of entertainment-related information such as listings of actors, directors, upcoming movies, and other related news. The software was sold under the mark "MovieBuff". In 1996 Brookfield began selling their MovieBuff product and providing online access to their searchable database from their website. The domain moviebuff.com had already been registered to West Coast Entertainment so Brookfield registered and used other domains. In 1997 Brookfield applied for federal registration of "MovieBuff" as both a good and a service trademark. It received the registrations in 1998.

In 1998 Brookfield learned that West Coast intended to launch a website at moviebuff.com which would contain, among other things, a searchable database of entertainment-related news. Brookfield issued a cease-and-desist letter to West Coast stating the website would infringe on Brookfield's trademark, MovieBuff. West Coast went ahead with their website plans; Brookfield subsequently filed a complaint alleging trademark infringement and unfair competition in violation of the Lanham Act.

== Procedural history ==
In November 1998 Brookfield filed a complaint against West Coast with the United States District Court for the Central District of California alleging trademark infringement and unfair competition under sections 32 and 43(a) of the Lanham Act, 15 U.S.C. § 1114,§ 1125(a). Brookfield then applied for a temporary restraining order that would prevent West Coast from using "MovieBuff" or "moviebuff.com" as its domain name, the name of its online service or in any "buried code or metatags" on their web site. The district court denied the motion for a temporary restraining order whereupon Brookfield filed for an appeal as well as an injunction against West Coast pending the appeal; the district court again denied the injunction. Finally, Brookfield filed an emergency motion for injunction pending appeal with the Ninth Circuit Court of Appeals which was granted. The Ninth Circuit then heard the appeal from the original denial of a temporary restraining order.

== Complaint ==
In their complaint, Brookfield alleged that West Coast's plan to offer an online searchable database of entertainment-related news at the site moviebuff.com would constitute trademark infringement and unfair competition under sections 32 and 43(a) of the Lanham Act, 15 U.S.C. § 1114, § 1125(a), infringing on Brookfield's trademark "MovieBuff".

== Opposition brief ==
Soon after Brookfield filed their complaint, West Coast filed an opposition brief in which they argued for their right to use moviebuff.com as planned. West Coast gave two reasons: 1) West Coast was the senior user of the mark; and 2) their intended use of moviebuff.com would not cause a likelihood of confusion so there could be no violation under the Lanham Act. West Coast put forth two arguments to support its claim as the senior user of the mark: 1) West Coast had used "The Movie Buff's Movie Store" in promotions and advertising since 1986 and it had a federally registered trademark on that logo; or 2) West Coast had established its right to the mark by using "moviebuff.com" before Brookfield began offering its online searchable database service.

== Court's finding ==
In considering whether to grant the preliminary injunction against West Coast, the Court of Appeals considered separately West Coast's use of the domain name moviebuff.com, and West Coast's use of any "buried code or metatags" containing "MovieBuff" or any terms likely to cause confusion with Brookfield's trademark.

=== Use of domain name ===
Brookfield had to first establish that it had a valid protectable trademark in "MovieBuff". The court found that it did, rejecting West Coast's contention that their use of "The Movie Buff's Movie Store" since 1986 established their prior use. The court based its finding on the fact that West Coast's trademark was not "essentially the same" as "MovieBuff". The court also rejected West Coast's second argument, that it was the senior user of moviebuff.com because it started using that domain name when it registered it in February 1996 while Brookfield only started offering the searchable database online under the name MovieBuff in August 1997. The court found that West Coast's use of moviebuff.com did not begin until it publicly announced its launch of that website in 1998 and so Brookfield's use of "MovieBuff" in connection with its online searchable database predates West Coast's use of moviebuff.com and therefore Brookfield is the senior user.

Once the court established that Brookfield was the senior user of its mark, it then looked to whether there was a likelihood of confusion that would cause consumers to attribute West Coast's site at moviebuff.com to Brookfield. The court considered the eight factors known commonly as the Sleekcraft factors in determining whether there was a likelihood of confusion: "similarity of the conflicting designations; relatedness or proximity of the two companies' products or services; strength of Brookfield's mark; marketing channels used; degree of care likely to be exercised by purchasers in selecting goods; West Coast's intent in selecting its mark; evidence of actual confusion; and likelihood of expansion in product lines." After weighing each of these factors, the court found that a likelihood of confusion did exist and that Brookfield did establish a "likelihood of success on its claim that West Coast's use of moviebuff.com violates the Lanham Act" and so a preliminary injunction against West Coast use of that domain name was warranted.

=== Use of metatags ===
The court considered separately the question of whether West Coast could use "MovieBuff" in any of its HTML code. The court found that while doing so might cause a search engine to include West Coast's site in the results returned for the search term "MovieBuff", it is unlikely to cause confusion as the searcher will see West Coast's site listed by the domain name (e.g., westcoastvideo.com) and will not be confused as to the source of that site. However, the court found that such use of the mark could result in initial interest confusion.

To explain initial interest confusion, the court gave as an analogy the case where one of West Coast's competitors, e.g., Blockbuster, posts a sign on the highway proclaiming "West Coast Video, exit 7" when in fact West Coast Video is at exit 8 and Blockbuster Video is at exit 7. The court explained how customers who take exit 7 looking for West Coast Video are likely to end up renting from Blockbuster once they realize they can not find West Coast Video and they see that Blockbuster is right there. Even customers who would prefer West Coast Video to Blockbuster might decide it is not worth the trouble to get back on the highway to continue searching for a West Coast Video. Although those customers have no confusion, they know they are renting from Blockbuster, Blockbuster has created initial interest confusion and is profiting unfairly from the good will established by the West Coast Video mark. The court explained that the false road sign posted by Blockbuster to attract West Coast Video customers is analogous to West Coast's inclusion of "MovieBuff" in its HTML code.

West Coast argued that its use of "MovieBuff" in its metatags was an appropriate descriptive term and so was a fair use. The court found however, that while the use of the descriptive term "Movie Buff" was perfectly legal, the use of "MovieBuff" was not. The former is a descriptive term associated with the West Coast products, the latter is not even a word in the English language.

The court found a likelihood of Brookfield succeeding on its claim of trademark infringement and so reversed the district court's decision and remanded back to the district court for a granting of the preliminary injunction.

== Subsequent criticism ==
Judge Berzon of the Ninth Circuit, in a concurring opinion in Playboy Enterprises, Inc. v. Netscape Communications Corp., asked whether the court wanted "to continue to apply an insupportable rule", referring to Initial Interest Confusion as discussed in Brookfield.

== See also ==
- Google, Inc. v. American Blind & Wallpaper Factory, Inc., No. 03-05340 (N.D. Cal. Apr. 18, 2007).
- Network Automation, Inc. v. Advanced Systems Concepts, Inc., 638 F.3d 1137 (9th Cir. 2011).
