= Playboy Enterprises, Inc. v. Netscape Communications Corp. =

Legal case concerning trademark infringement and dilution

Playboy Enterprises, Inc. v. Netscape Communications Corp
- Court: United States Court of Appeals for the Ninth Circuit
- Full case name: Playboy Enterprises, Inc. v. Netscape Communications Corporation v. Excite, Inc.
- Argued: September 11, 2001
- Decided: January 14, 2004
- Citation: 354 F.3d 1020

Holding
- The use of trademarked terms for targeted advertising, if the resulting ads do not properly identify the company being advertised and imply an association with the trademark owner, can constitute trademark infringement and trademark dilution.

Court membership
- Judges sitting: Betty B. Fletcher, Thomas G. Nelson and Marsha Berzon

Case opinions
- Majority: Thomas G. Nelson
- Concurrence: Marsha Berzon

Laws applied
- trademark law

Playboy Enterprises, Inc. v. Netscape Communications Corp., 354 F.3d 1020 (9th Cir. 2004) was a case regarding trademark infringement and trademark dilution decided by the United States Court of Appeals for the Ninth Circuit. The ruling addressed unauthorized use of trademarked terms when using web search data to determine the recipients of banner ads.

== Facts ==
As an Internet search engine, Netscape allowed advertisers to target specific users of its service by displaying certain ads to certain people, depending on what each user searches for. This practice is called "keying" in the Internet industry, and is considered more effective than displaying ads to web users at random.

Playboy Enterprises learned that Netscape was using this technique to send certain banner ads to users who had searched for the terms "Playboy" and "Playmate" which are trademarked by Playboy. The ads were for adult entertainment-oriented services in general, and often featured Playboy's competitors. Playboy claimed that Netscape's use of those terms in its keying technique constituted trademark infringement.

In addition, by displaying ads that were for Playboy's competitors but not easily discerned as such because company names were often obscured, Playboy claimed that Netscape had committed trademark dilution. This in turn could confuse web users into thinking that Playboy was behind all such ads, per the initial interest confusion doctrine. Finally, Playboy claimed that this practice allowed other companies to profit by connecting their own names to that of Playboy and gaining prestige by association.

== District court proceedings ==
The case was first heard at the District Court for the Central District of California in 1999. Playboy sought a preliminary injunction to prevent Netscape from continuing its "keying" processes with the company's trademarked terms. The district court held that Playboy could not prove that Netscape was using the terms in a fashion that created harm under existing trademark law. Hence, the court rejected Playboy's claim of trademark infringement. Furthermore, Playboy could not prove that the "keying" process caused enough confusion among web users to constitute trademark dilution. Thus, the court denied Playboy's request for an injunction against Netscape. Playboy Enterprises appealed this ruling to the Ninth Circuit Court of Appeals, which heard the case in 2001.

== Circuit court ruling ==
The Ninth Circuit analyzed the dispute with a greater focus on the initial interest confusion doctrine, which it had addressed in Brookfield Communications, Inc. v. West Coast Entertainment Corp., another recent case involving confusion over the use of trademarked terms during the web search process. Under that precedent, Playboy could claim under the initial interest confusion doctrine that users were likely to be confused about the nature of banner ads at first glance, and would only be able to determine that such ads were or were not affiliated with Playboy after further investigation. This could damage the value of the company's trademarks while adding prestige to unrelated companies.

The circuit court applied a nine-part test, which had been established in the older trademark law precedent AMF Inc. v. Sleekcraft Boats, to determine the level of confusion that may be experienced by viewers of the banner ads in question. The factors most relevant for Playboy's claim included evidence of actual confusion among consumers, due to evidence to this effect presented by Playboy; the defendant's use of a trademark for its own marketing purposes; the care to be exercised by the average consumer; and the defendant's intent to confuse consumers advertently or inadvertently. The other factors in the initial interest confusion doctrine were found to be irrelevant to this dispute, but those listed here worked in favor of Playboy.

Netscape claimed that its use of Playboy's trademarked terms for the keying practice constituted nominative use, but this defense was rejected by the circuit court due to the advertising-related intent of confusing consumers during the keying process. Netscape also attempted a "functional use" defense; under that doctrine, parts of a design that have a functional use may not receive trademark protection. This claim was also rejected by the circuit court because Playboy magazine could have received any other name but it would retain the same function. A broader attempt at a fair use defense was also rejected due to the obvious likelihood of consumer confusion over ownership of the resulting banner ads received after searching for the trademarked terms.

Thus, the circuit court reversed the lower court's ruling on trademark infringement, and granted an injunction to Playboy Enterprises. This restricted Netscape from using Playboy's trademarked terms to generate banner ads via the keying process, unless those ads were clearly labelled with information on their origins, to prevent consumers from assuming they were affiliated with Playboy. Meanwhile, the circuit court determined that some issues of fact remained over whether the keying practice resulted in dilution of Playboy's trademarked terms. This matter was remanded to the district court for further discovery.

== Impact ==
Playboy Enterprises, Inc. v. Netscape Communications Corp. has been noted as an important precedent on the matter of using trademarked terms to generate targeted ads on the Internet, and on the need for full identification of the origin of the resulting ads. The ruling has also been cited as an important development in assessing the consumer confusion that can be engendered by Internet advertising.
