= IntelliTXT =

Example of an intellitext ad

The IntelliTXT Logo.

IntelliTXT is a keyword advertising platform developed by Vibrant Media. Web page publishers insert a script into their pages which calls the IntelliTXT platform when a viewer views the page.

== Overview ==
This script then finds keywords on the page and double underlines them. When holding the mouse over the double underlined link, an advertisement associated with that word will pop up. Advertisers pay to have their particular words associated to their advertisements.

== Customers ==
According to Vibrant Media, more than 4500 publishers use the IntelliTXT system. Nike, Sony and Microsoft are advertising on the platform, their ads reaching more than 100 million unique users in the US and 170 million internationally each month.

== Competitors ==
- Adbrite
