= Rescuecom Corp. v. Google Inc. =

American legal case

Rescuecom Corp. v. Google Inc
- Court: United States Court of Appeals for the Second Circuit
- Full case name: Rescuecom Corp. v. Google Inc.
- Argued: April 3, 2008
- Decided: April 3, 2009
- Citation: 562 F.3d 123

Case history
- Prior history: Rescuecom Corp. v. Google Inc., No. 5:04-CV-1055 NAM/GHL (N.D.N.Y Sep. 28, 2006)

Holding
- The recommendation of a trademarked business name to web users during the creation of targeted ads constitutes trademark infringement.

Court membership
- Judges sitting: Pierre N. Leval, Guido Calabresi, Richard C. Wesley

Case opinions
- Majority: Pierre N. Leval

Laws applied
- Lanham Act, trademark law

Rescuecom Corp. v. Google Inc., 562 F.3d 123 (2nd Cir. 2009), was a case at the United States Court of Appeals for the Second Circuit, in which the court held that recommending a trademark for keyword advertising was a commercial use of the trademark, and could constitute trademark infringement.

== Background ==
AdWords is a system used by Google through which advertisers can purchase keywords. When a user searches for a purchased keyword, Google displays advertisements from the purchasing firm. Google also provides its advertising customers with a "Keyword Suggestion Tool", which recommends additional keywords for the customer to purchase. Rescuecom, a computer repair and service firm, discovered that Google had used its name during this process, and recommended it to it AdWords customers.

The name "Rescuecom" was trademarked by the company. Rescuecom further found that Google had recommended its name for purchase by some of Rescuecom's own competitors. The company therefore filed suit against Google claiming violations of the Lanham Act, including trademark infringement, trademark dilution, false designation of origin, and tortious interference in business relations with an intent to gain economic advantage.

== District court proceedings ==
The case was first heard by the United States District Court for the Northern District of New York in 2006. The district court drew heavily on the Second Circuit precedent 1-800 CONTACTS, INC. v. WhenU. com, Inc., concerning the use of software that generated pop-up advertisements based on a computer user's actions, with the ads being generated from a database of company domain names. In that precedent, the court held that the usage of a trademarked domain name in an "unpublished directory of terms" and the appearance of "separate, branded ads" triggered by a trademark do not constitute "use" of the trademark under the Lanham Act.

In its ruling in the Rescuecom case, the district court held that, per the WhenU precedent, Rescuecom had "prove[d] no facts in support of its claim... [of] trademark use" by Google. Given that a trademark "use" is required under the Lanham Act for infringement to occur, the district court dismissed Rescuecom's complaint. Rescuecom appealed this ruling to the Second Circuit Court of Appeals.

== Circuit court opinion ==
The Second Circuit reversed the district court's decision in 2009, holding that Google's use of the "Rescuecom" trademark constituted a "use in commerce" under the Lanham Act, even when recommending it for purchase by its own advertising customers.

The circuit court held that the lower court had interpreted the WhenU precedent incorrectly, because Google's process of selling keywords for its AdWords service was a different type of business practice. The court rejected Google's argument that the inclusion of a trademarked term in an internal computer directory does not constitute "use" of that trademark under the Lanham Act. Instead, the court held that "Google’s recommendation and sale of Rescuecom’s mark to its advertising customers are not internal uses" and were a full business transaction. If the court were to accept Google's argument, "the operators of search engines would be free to use trademarks in ways designed to deceive and cause consumer confusion. This is surely neither within the intention nor the letter of the Lanham Act."

In another departure from the matters discussed in the WhenU precedent, the circuit court accepted Rescuecom's assertion that Google's placement of "sponsored links" purchased by its AdWords customers, above organic search results at the google.com page, could lead consumers to conclude that such ads were associated with Rescuecom. As a result, Google's argument that a sponsored link is analogous to placement of a generic brand next to a trademarked brand was rejected by the circuit court.

The Second Circuit thus vacated the district court decision, ruling that Google's actions constituted commercial use and that Rescuecom's claims of trademark infringement, trademark dilution, and related claims could not be immediately dismissed as Google requested. The case was sent back to the district court for reconsideration of possible financial damages to be paid to Rescuecom.

== Impact and subsequent developments ==
In 2010, Rescuecom moved to drop the proceedings against Google and issued a press release declaring victory in the case. However, Google apparently made no new concessions to Rescuecom to get it to drop the lawsuit; instead, the changes that Rescuecom claimed as victory had been made by Google five years earlier. Thus it was unclear if Google had adjusted its AdWords recommendation process based on the circuit court ruling, or if Rescuecom had realized any rewards.

Meanwhile, the original district court ruling was criticized for confusing the matter of "commercial use" of trademarked terms on the Internet for advertising practices that would be permitted for traditional advertising, though the Second Circuit ruling on appeal has been cited as an important if uncertain precedent for the law of Internet advertising.
