= 1-800 Contacts, Inc. v. WhenU.com, Inc. =

American legal case

1-800 CONTACTS v. WhenU.com
- Court: United States Court of Appeals for the Second Circuit
- Full case name: 1-800 CONTACTS v. WhenU.com
- Argued: April 5 2003
- Decided: June 27 2005
- Citation: 414 F.3d 400

Holding
- WhenU's actions did not amount to the "use" that the Lanham Act requires in order to constitute trademark infringement. The appeal court reversed the preliminary injunction and ordered the dismissal of all claims made by 1-800 CONTACTS that were based upon trademark infringement, leaving the claims based upon unfair competition and copyright infringement. The case is remanded to the district court.

Court membership
- Judges sitting: John Walker, Chester Straub

Case opinions
- Majority: John Walker

Laws applied
- 15 U.S.C. § 1125(a)

1-800 CONTACTS v. WhenU.com, 414 F.3d 400, was a legal dispute beginning in 2002 over pop-up advertisements. It was brought by 1-800 Contacts, an online distributor of various brands of contact lenses against WhenU SaveNow, a maker of advertising software. The suit also named Vision Direct, one of WhenU advertising customers, as a co-defendant. 1-800 CONTACTS alleged that the advertisements provided by WhenU, which advertised competitors of 1-800 CONTACTS (such as Vision Direct) when people viewed the company's web site, were "inherently deceptive" and that one of the advertisements "misleads users into falsely believing the pop-up advertisements supplied by WhenU.com are in actuality advertisements authorized by and originating with the underlying Web site".

== Facts ==
Both the plaintiff, 1-800 Contacts, and the co-defendant, Vision Direct, sell and market replacement contacts lenses though their respective websites. The other defendant, WhenU.com was a software company that developed and distributed a software application known as "SaveNow". The SaveNow program, when installed on a users computer, remains resident in memory and observes activity within the user's web browser. It is normally installed as part of a "bundle" of other software programs, and is provided at no cost to the user. The SaveNow program contains a directory that match specific URLs or search terms that the user enters into their browser to categories of popup advertisements. Specifically relevant to this case, when the user typed "1800contacts.com" into their browser the SaveNow program would match this to the category "eye-care" and retrieve an ad for a company in this space. At least three types of ads can be presented to the user—small "pop-up" advertisement appearing in the bottom right-hand corner of a user's screen; it may be a "pop-under" advertisement that appears behind the webpage the user initially visited; or it may be a "panoramic" advertisement that stretches across the bottom of the user's computer screen.

=== Plaintiff's theory ===
Plaintiff argues that it has been harmed by the creation of an "impermissible affiliation between Plaintiff and Defendant", since because of Defendants' pop-up advertising, users "are likely to have the impression that the pop-up advertisements operate in cooperation with, rather than in competition against, the Plaintiff". William D. Neal, an expert for 1-800 Contacts, conducted a study to determine if consumers were likely to be confused as to the source of the popup advertisements displayed by the defendants software. The conclusion of this survey was the 76% of users who had the SaveNow software on their system did not realize that it generated pop-up ads as the result of them visiting specific websites. Additionally, he reported that 60% of people who participated in his survey believed that "pop-up advertisements are placed on the website on which they appear by the owners of that site".

=== Defendant's theory ===
Avi Naider, CEO of WhenU.com, testified that the SaveNow program performs "contextual marketing", which he defined as "delivering something to a consumer when they need it". He also argued, through the presentation of a number of screen captures, that the use of pop-ups was analogous to a number of other common computer programs including instant messaging software. Additionally, professor John Deighton, an expert in interactive marketing, testified that due to novel structure of the internet, a "conjoined" model has emerged that is "a combination of publisher and marketplace". As a result, he argues there is an expectation that websites will present users with an experience to users reads like a publication, with an expectation of competition. Finally, he testified that a preliminary injunction, if granted, would have "some short-term immediate impacts and some chilling long-term impacts". This assertion was based on his belief that users who had chosen to install the SaveNow software would be frustrated in further attempts to use the software.

== Preliminary injunction ==
In December 2003 Judge Deborah Batts of the United States District Court for the Southern District of New York granted a preliminary injunction, barring WhenU from delivering the advertisements to some web surfers, on the grounds that it constituted trademark infringement violating the Lanham Act. The district court held that while the trademark infringement claim was likely to succeed on the merits the copyright infringement claim was unmeritorious.

== Second Circuit appeal ==
Upon appeal, the United States Court of Appeals for the Second Circuit held that WhenU's actions did not amount to the "use" that the Lanham Act (15 U.S.C. § 1125(a)) requires in order to constitute trademark infringement. The appeal court reversed the preliminary injunction and ordered the dismissal of all claims made by 1-800 CONTACTS that were based upon trademark infringement, leaving the claims based upon unfair competition and copyright infringement.

The district court had found that 1-800 CONTACTS was unlikely to prevail in its copyright infringement claims, finding that "the conduct neither violated [the] plaintiff's right to display its copyrighted website, nor its right to create derivative works therefrom". 1-800 Contacts did not appeal from the adverse copyright ruling. The same commentary notes that plaintiffs in these cases (reprints and commentary on several of which are contained in the cited source) argue that "pop-ups and other contextual advertising . . . piggy-backs or 'free-rides' on the content that other Web sites provide."

== Outside involvement ==
The Electronic Frontier Foundation criticized the case, stating that it was "not to help [people] fight off adware and spyware" but was rather intended to allow companies "to gain control over [a computer's] desktop". They argued this lawsuit if successful "would create a precedent that would enable trademark owners to dictate what could be open on your desktop when you visit their websites". At the time of the appeal it filed an amicus curiae brief urging the Appeals Court to limit the reach of the "initial interest confusion" doctrine that had been applied by the District Court.
