= Initial interest confusion =

Trademark law doctrine

Initial interest confusion is a legal doctrine under trademark law that permits a finding of infringement when there is temporary confusion that is dispelled before the purchase is made. Generally, trademark infringement is based on the likelihood of confusion for a consumer in the marketplace. This likelihood is typically determined using a multi-factor test that includes factors like the strength of the mark and evidence of any actual confusion. However, trademark infringement that relies on Initial interest confusion does not require a likelihood of confusion at the time of sale; the mark must only capture the consumer's initial attention.

A noteworthy hypothetical example of Initial interest confusion, first discussed in Brookfield v West Coast Entertainment, involves two video stores. West Coast Video's competitor, Blockbuster Video, puts a billboard on a stretch of highway advertising a West Coast Video at an upcoming exit. In reality, there is no West Coast Video at this exit; it is a Blockbuster Video instead. The consumer, expecting to find a West Coast Video store, sees the Blockbuster Video and decides to patronize the suitable replacement. Even though the confusion has been dispelled, Blockbuster is still misappropriating the acquired goodwill of West Coast Video's trademark.

== History ==
The Initial interest confusion doctrine has been applied by U.S. courts as early as 1975. However, with the appearance of the World Wide Web, Initial interest confusion claims have increased from 10 cases relying on the doctrine before 1990 to more than 100 between 1990 and 2005.

=== Origin ===
==== Grotrian v Steinway & Sons ====
The first judgment involving Initial interest confusion was in Grotrian, Helfferich, Schults., Th. Steinweg Nachf. v Steinway & Sons, although that exact expression is never used. At the time of the dispute, Grotrian, Helfferich, Schultz., Th. Steinweg Nachf. (also referred to as "Grotrian") was importing into the United States pianos labeled "Grotrian-Steinweg" and advertised under the name "Steinweg". Consequently, Steinway & Sons filled a trademark infringement suit against Grotrian. The parties are historically linked – the founder of Steinway & Sons, Henry E. Steinway, who had Anglicised his name from Heinrich Engelhard Steinweg after migrating to New York in 1850, had initially made pianos in Germany branded Steinweg, and his son partnered with Grotrian. When Steinweg/Steinway left for America, the German business was sold to the three employees, Grotrian, Helfferich and Schulz, with permission to use the "Steinweg" name.

On appeal, 2nd Circuit Judge W. H. Timbers confirmed the opinion of Judge L. F. MacMahon that "misled into an initial interest, a potential Steinway buyer may satisfy himself that the less expensive Grotrian-Steinweg is at least as good, if not better, than a Steinway." The Appellate Court, however, recognized the likelihood of confusion may not exist at the time of purchase, because those who buy expensive pianos can be considered to be well informed. Instead, the Court held that actual or potential confusion at the time of purchase did not need to be demonstrated in this case. The motivation behind that decision was that "the Grotrian-Steinweg name would attract potential customers based on the reputation built up by Steinway in [the United States] for many years". The Court concluded that Grotrian was attempting to increase their sales based on the strength of the name of "Steinway" and that "such initial confusion works an injury to Steinway".

==== Mobil Oil Corp. v Pegasus Petroleum Corp. ====
The next significant decision relying on Initial interest confusion was Mobil Oil Corp. v Pegasus Petroleum Corp.. In this case, Mobil sued Pegasus Petroleum, an oil trading company founded in 1981, on the basis of a trademark infringement concerning the "Pegasus" name. Mobil is the holder of a registered trademark in both the flying horse symbol representing the Greek mythological figure of Pegasus, and the name "Pegasus" itself. However, the logo of Pegasus Petroleum did not represent any sort of flying horse and solely consisted of two interlocking letters "P".

At the first trial, Judge L. F. MacMahon concluded that "there is a sufficient likelihood of confusion between Mobil's flying horse symbol and Pegasus Petroleum's use of the 'Pegasus' mark to grant Mobil relief under the Lanham Act." While finding the decision "not clearly erroneous", the 2nd Circuit Court clarified on Appeal that the likelihood of confusion had to be understood as a "likelihood that Pegasus Petroleum would gain crucial credibility during the initial phases of a deal". The Court concluded that Pegasus Petroleum was misleading potential customers because of their initial interest suggested by the Pegasus mark and holds that this initial confusion alone constitutes a sufficient trademark injury.

=== The Internet Era ===
Initial interest confusion has become much more visible in the Internet age. Courts have upheld trademark infringement claims in domain names (cybersquatting), meta-tags that influence search engine results, and advertising keywords using the Initial interest confusion doctrine.

==== Brookfield Communications, Inc. v. West Coast Entertainment Corp. ====
In Brookfield Communications, Inc. v. West Coast Entertainment Corp., the 9th Circuit embraced the Initial interest confusion doctrine which has previously been developed in the 2nd Circuit, and directly addresses the question whether registered trademark terms can be used as meta tags on web pages of non-trademark holders.

Brookfield developed a software, named MovieBuff, which consisted of a searchable database of past, current and upcoming films, their box office reviews, schedules, and other data. A federal trademark registration for "MovieBuff" was issued in 1998, covering both goods and services. In order to sell the MovieBuff software, Brookfield registered two domain names: moviebuffonline.com and brookfieldcomm.com in 1996. He also placed a version of the database online at inhollywood.com. Brookfield was not able to register the domain moviebuff.com at the time because West Coast has previously registered it.

West Coast, one of the nation's largest video rental store chains, subsequently launched on moviebuff.com an online movie database service similar to the one Brookfield had deployed. Furthermore, both this web site and westcoastvideo.com, the legitimate domain of West Coast, contained the meta keywords "moviebuff" and "moviebuff.com". These meta keywords were intended to be indexed by search engines, so that a consumer searching for "moviebuff" could find the page. While this was a common way to increase visibility in earlier search engines, most modern search engines do not rely on meta keywords for ranking results.

Although the 9th Circuit admitted that there was no likelihood of confusion between the two products, the Court nonetheless held West Coast liable for trademark infringement because the "moviebuff" trademark, as well as "moviebuff.com", appeared in the metatags of westcoastvideo.com, the non-infringing domain used by West Coast. The Court states "although there is no source confusion in the sense that consumers know they are patronizing West Coast rather than Brookfield, there is nevertheless initial interest confusion in the sense that, by using moviebuff.com or MovieBuff to divert people looking for MovieBuff to its web site, West Coast improperly benefits from the goodwill that Brookfield developed in its trademark."

==== Playboy Enterprises, Inc. v. Netscape Communications Corp. ====
In Playboy Enterprises, Inc. v. Netscape Communications Corp., Playboy charged Netscape (along with Excite) for selling banner ads keyed on trademarked terms "playboy" and "playmate". A district court dismissed the case, citing fair use and other arguments. However, the Ninth Circuit drew comparisons to Brookfield v West Coast, and came to the conclusion that "analogies to Brookfield suggest that PEI will be able to show a likelihood of confusion sufficient to defeat summary judgment. The Court held that Playboy was likely to show that consumers may be attracted to competitors' products by free riding Playboy's reputation when using the trademarks "playboy" and "playmate", even if the consumers are well aware that they are not buying services from Playboy.

== Controversy ==
Several people have criticized the doctrine of Initial interest confusion. One concern is that Initial interest confusion "lacks a rigorous definition". Others have said that, absent a coherent conception of damage to the trademark holder, initial interest confusion makes actionable not "actual damage incurred by the trademark holder" but something more like "brand indignation." Additionally, some state that because Initial interest confusion can be found without the multi-factor analysis of likelihood of confusion, it represents "a short-cut to infringement, like a judicial game of 'Chutes and Ladders'" Another concern is the lack of consensus among courts about the applicability of Initial interest confusion. Judge Berzon of the Ninth Circuit, in a concurring opinion in Playboy Enterprises, Inc. v. Netscape Communications Corp., asked whether the court wanted "to continue to apply an insupportable rule", referring to Initial interest confusion as discussed in Brookfield.

== Notable cases ==
- Google, Inc. v. American Blind & Wallpaper Factory, Inc., in which the legality of Google's AdWord program was challenged on the basis of initial interest confusion.
- Lamparello v. Falwell
