= Consumer confusion =

Aspect of consumer behavior

Consumer confusion is a state of mind that leads to consumers making imperfect purchasing decisions or lacking confidence in the correctness of their purchasing decisions.

== Confusion ==
Confusion occurs when a consumer fails to correctly understand or interpret products and services. This, in turn, leads to them making imperfect purchasing decisions. This concept is important to marketeers because consumer confusion may result in reduced sales, reduced satisfaction with products and difficulty communicating effectively with the consumer. It is a widely studied and broad subject which is a part of consumer behaviour and decision making.

== Causes ==
=== Choice overload ===
Choice overload (sometimes called overchoice in the context of confusion) occurs when the set of purchasing options becomes overwhelmingly large for a consumer. A good example is wine in the UK where supermarkets may present over 1000 different products leaving the consumer with a difficult choice process. Whilst large assortments do have some positive aspects (principally novelty and stimulation and optimal solutions) any assortment greater than around 12–14 products leads to confusion and specifically transferring the ownership of quality assurance to the consumer. What this means in practice is reduced levels of satisfaction with purchases from large assortments as a consumer may be left with doubt that they have succeeded in finding the "best" product. Choice overload is growing with ever larger supermarkets and the internet being two of the main causes. Research shows that choice overload can lead to decision fatigue, where the cognitive effort required to choose from many options causes consumers to delay decisions or rely on convenience over preference. This may also result in regret aversion, where consumers feel less confident about their choices and experience post-purchase doubt. As product assortments expand in supermarkets and online, these challenges become more pronounced.

=== Similarity ===
Similarity is where two or more products lack differentiating features which prevents the consumer easily distinguishing between them. Differentiating features could be any from the marketing mix or anything else associated with the product such as brand. Similarity of products has the negative effect on the consumer of increasing the cognitive effort required to make a decision. and reducing the perception of accuracy of decision. Both of these reduce the satisfaction with a decision and thereby satisfaction with the purchase.

=== Lack of information ===
A consumer may suffer from lack of information if the information doesn't exist, is unavailable to them at the required moment or is too complex for them to use in their decision making process.

=== Information overload ===
Too much information surrounding a product or service disturbs the consumer by forcing them to engage in a more complex and time-consuming purchasing process. This, and the fact that it is difficult to compare and value the information when it is superfluous, leaves the consumer unsatisfied, insecure regarding what choice to make, and more prone to delay the decision-making, and thereby the actual purchase. Furthermore, excessive and conflicting information, particularly in environments such as supermarkets, can contribute to label fatigue, where consumers become overwhelmed by the volume of product claims, making it difficult to differentiate between options. This often results in decisions based on superficial characteristics like branding or packaging, rather than a thorough evaluation of the product's attributes. The phenomenon of choice overload further complicates the decision-making process by increasing the cognitive burden on consumers, reducing overall satisfaction and leading to indecision or delayed purchases. Recent research also shows that information overload can lead to consumer avoidance, where individuals may opt not to make a purchase due to overwhelming or conflicting details, particularly in environments with numerous health-related claims. The rise of digital tools has amplified this challenge, with vast amounts of online information often lacking consistency, further complicating consumer decisions.

=== Lack of consistency ===
When information provided on a product and/or service is not consistent with the consumer's previously held beliefs and convictions, ambiguity occurs in the understanding of the product.

== Law ==
Trademark infringement is measured by the multi-factor "likelihood of confusion" test. That is, a new mark will infringe on an existing trademark if the new mark is so similar to the original that consumers are likely to confuse the two marks, and mistakenly purchase from the wrong company.

The likelihood of confusion test turns on several factors, including:

- Strength of the plaintiff's trademark;
- Degree of similarity between the two marks at issue;
- Similarity of the goods and services at issue;
- Evidence of actual confusion;
- Purchaser sophistication;
- Quality of the defendant's goods or services;
- Defendant's intent in adopting the mark.

Initial interest confusion occurs when a mark is used to attract a consumer, but upon inspection there is no confusion. This type of confusion is well-recognized for Internet searches, where a consumer may be looking for the site of one company, and a second site mimics keywords and metadata to draw hits from the "real" site.

Point of sale confusion occurs when a consumer believes their product to be from a company which it is not.

Post sale confusion occurs after a product is purchased, and third parties mistakenly think that the product is produced by a different, generally more prestigious, brand.
