= Keyword advertising =

Form of advertising on the Internet

Keyword advertising is a form of online advertising in which an advertiser pays to have an advertisement appear in the results listing when a person uses a particular phrase to search the Web, typically by employing a search engine. The particular phrase is composed of one or more key terms that are linked to one or more advertisements. The most common form or keyword advertising, focused on payment methods, is pay per click (PPC), with other forms being cost per action (CPA) or cost per mille (CPM).

The first documented attempt at keyword advertising was 1996, by the search company OpenText, just a few years after the first attempt at banner advertisements. However, the project was soon abandoned.

In 1997 Yahoo!, through its partnership with Flycast Communications, successfully launched banner advertising based on keyword searches. Their concept originated from discussions in late 1996 with Chip Royce, head of online marketing for InterZine Productions of Boca Raton, Florida, who suggested that ads around keyword results would provide more effective results for advertisers. In 1997, Yahoo! obliged by placing targeted ad banners when the keyword "Golf" was searched by Yahoo! users. Yahoo! later turned this opportunity into a formal marketing program for its entire customer base and promoted this in a July 1997 article in the now defunct 'Internet Week' magazine.

In 1998, GoTo.com launched the first commercially successful keyword auction model, with a patent on the concept issued in 1998.

== Modern Day Use ==
Google Ads is the most well-known keyword advertising platform. Google displays search ads specifically targeted to the word(s) typed into a search box on the results page, and these keyword cause targeted ads also appear on content sites based on Google's system's interpretation of the subject matter on each page of the site. This is known as contextual advertising. Other search engines offering keyword advertising include Yahoo! Search Marketing, Bing Ads, and Looksmart, along with many others.

A less common type of keyword advertising hyper-links individual words within the text of a page to small pop-ups displayed by mouseover. Advertising of this type is offered by Kontera, Vibrant Media, and LinkWorth. Kontera's version is named ContentLink, Vibrant Media's version is called IntelliTXT and LinkWorth's version is called LinkWords. They refer to their product as in-text placement. Advertisers choosing to test this type will want to exercise moderation to increase Internet user acceptance.

== Trademark issues ==
There have been a number of trademark infringement cases brought by brand owners and companies concerned with how other keyword advertisers used their trademarks or brands in pay-per-click or keyword advertising. Courts in the U.S. and around the world have been slow to issue clear guidance on the issue of whether the use of trademarks as keywords constitutes trademark infringement. This lack of guidance, however, may be partially due to the fact that the majority of keyword advertising cases are settled out of court and do not proceed to trial. This leaves courts unable to make legal decisions on issues brought in these cases. As a result, there are still many unanswered questions on the issue of whether the sale or purchase and use of a trademark as a keyword to trigger Internet advertisements is trademark infringement.

In 2013, the Tenth Circuit Court of Appeals held in Lens.com, Inc. v. 1-800 Contacts, Inc. that online contact lens seller Lens.com did not commit trademark infringement when it purchased search advertisements using competitor 1-800 Contacts' federally registered 1800 CONTACTS trademark as a keyword. In August 2016, the Federal Trade Commission filed an administrative complaint against 1-800 Contacts alleging, among other things, that its search advertising trademark enforcement practices have unreasonably restrained competition in violation of the FTC Act. 1-800 Contacts has denied all wrongdoing and is scheduled to appear before an FTC administrative law judge in April 2017.

== See also ==
- Bananabay II, 2011 decision of the Federal Court of Justice of Germany (BGH).
- Rosetta Stone v. Google Inc, 676 F.3d 144 (4th Cir. 2012).
