= Google Ads =

Online advertising platform owned by Google

- Other names: Google AdWords
- Developer: Google
- Release: 24 October 2000; 26 years ago

Stable release(s) [±]
- Android: 3.42 (Build 1009942281) / October 29, 2026; 18 days ago
- iOS (Note: Including iPadOS): 3.42 (Build 20091557) / October 30, 2026; 17 days ago
- Platform: Android 7+, iOS 16+, web Discontinued: Android 5, 6, iOS 15 (2025); Android Jelly Bean, KitKat, iOS 14 (2024); iOS 13 (2023); iOS 11, 12 (2021); iOS 9, 10 (2019); Android Ice Cream Sandwich (2018)
- Type: Online advertising
- Website: ads.google.com

Google Ads, formerly known as Google AdWords, is an online advertising platform developed by Google, where advertisers bid to display brief digital advertisements, service offerings, product listings, and videos to web users. It can place ads in the results of search engines like Google Search (the Google Search Network), mobile apps, videos, and on non-search websites. Services are offered under a pay-per-click (PPC) pricing model, and a cost-per-view (CPV) pricing model.

== History ==
Former logo of the service

Google launched AdWords in year 2000. Initially, Google itself would set up and manage advertisers' campaigns. Google then introduced a self-service AdWords portal for small businesses that wanted to manage their own campaigns.

In 2005, Google started a campaign management service known as "Jumpstart".

In January 2006 Google purchased the radio advertising company dMarc Broadcasting.

In 2007, Google acquired DoubleClick for $3.1 billion. The acquisition was strategically important for Google, providing access to DoubleClick's advanced ad-serving technology and established industry relationships. This deal, while "transforming Google into a powerhouse", later attracted antitrust scrutiny, raising questions about its impact on market competition and digital advertising dominance.

In 2008, Google launched the Google Online Marketing Challenge, an in-class academic exercise for tertiary students.

Google retired the DoubleClick and AdWords brands in 2018 to simplify entry points for advertisers and ad sellers. The core product was renamed Google Ads, providing access to inventory on Google Search, its YouTube video service, the Google Play app store, and AdSense website publisher partners.

== Functionality ==
Google Ads' system is based partly on cookies and partly on keywords determined by advertisers. Google uses these characteristics to place advertising copy on pages that they think might be relevant. In 2023, Google introduced Topics API, which allows targeting ads based on browsing history stored in browser, to Google Chrome. Advertisers pay when users divert their browsing to click on the advertising copy. Adverts can be implemented locally, nationally, or internationally.

Google's text advertisements mimic what the average search result looks like on Google. Offering text-only search ads initially, Google unveiled "Showcase Shopping" ads in 2016. With this format, retailers can choose to have a series of product images that appear in search results related to various search queries and keywords. In May 2016, Google announced Expanded Text Ads, allowing 23% more text. Image ads in the display network can be one of the several different standardized sizes as designated by the Interactive Advertising Bureau (IAB).

Besides the Google search engine, advertisers also have the option of enabling their ads to show on Google's partner network, members of which receive a portion of the generated income.

In 2024, Google Ads introduced AI-powered tools, including the "Ads Power Pair" of Search and Performance Max, designed to improve campaign efficiency across Google channels. These tools leverage first-party data, machine learning, and automated asset creation to enhance bidding, targeting, and audience reach.

In 2025, Google launched AI-powered ad tools for Indian Marketer. Ad will appear in AI Overviews for Indian users. Google launches “Generated for you” feature in product studio which will automatically create brand aligned images and videos by analyzing merchant catalogs and trending campaign concepts.

On January 28, 2026, Google launched the "Ads Decoded" podcast, which focuses on using AI-driven tools for campaign measurement and optimization.

=== Restrictions on ad content ===
The "family status" of an ad ("family safe", "non-family safe", or "adult") is set by a Google reviewer and indicates what "audiences the ad and website are appropriate for". This will change at what time, on which page, and in which country an ad can appear.

As of December 2010, Google AdWords decreased restrictions on sales of hard alcohol. It now allows ads that promote the sale of hard alcohol and liquor. This is an extension of a policy change that was made in December 2008, which permitted ads that promote the branding of hard alcohol and liquor.

From June 2007, Google banned AdWords adverts for student essay-writing services, a move which received positive feedback from universities. Google has a variety of specific keywords and categories that it prohibits that vary by type and country. For example, use of keywords for alcohol related products are prohibited in Thailand and Turkey; keywords for gambling and casinos are prohibited in Poland; keywords for abortion services are prohibited in Russia and Ukraine; and keywords for adult related services or products are prohibited worldwide as of June 2014.

In March 2020, at the beginning of the Coronavirus crisis, Google blocked all face masks keywords from being eligible for ad targeting as part of a policy to prevent companies from attempting to capitalize on the pandemic.

=== Conversion tracking ===
Google Ads introduced enhanced conversions to make conversion measurement more accurate.

In 2018, Bloomberg News reported that Google had paid millions of dollars to Mastercard for its users' credit card data for offline conversion tracking purposes. The deal had not been publicly announced.

== Technology ==
Google developed a custom distributed relational database known as Google Spanner specifically for the needs of the ad business. The interface offers spreadsheet editing, search query reports, and conversion metrics.

=== Campaign types ===
Google Ads offers several campaign types that determine where ads can appear and which advertising objectives they are designed to support. The main campaign types include Search, Display, Shopping, Video, App, Demand Gen and Performance Max campaigns.

=== Project Bernanke ===
Google ran a years-long program called "Project Bernanke" that used data from past advertising bids to gain an advantage over competing for ad services. The project benefited Google by adjusting bids from advertisers with an advertising history when they would lose the bid to a competitor.

== Lawsuits ==
Google Ads have been the subject of lawsuits relating to Trademark Law (Google, Inc. v. American Blind & Wallpaper Factory, Inc. and Rescuecom Corp. v. Google Inc.), fraud (Goddard v. Google, Inc.), and click fraud.

Overture Services, Inc. sued Google for patent infringement in April 2002 in relation to the AdWords service. The suit was settled in 2004 after Yahoo! acquired Overture; Google agreed to issue 2.7 million shares of common stock to Yahoo! in exchange for a perpetual license under the patent.

In 2006, Google settled a click-fraud lawsuit for US$90 million.

In March 2010, Google was involved with a trademark infringement case involving three French companies that own Louis Vuitton trademarks. The lawsuit concerned if Google was responsible for advertisers purchasing keywords that violate trademark infringement. Ultimately, the Court of Justice of the European Union ruled that AdWords is an "information society service" under EU laws and Google is not obligated to monitor everything that goes on AdWords and they're not liable for trademark misuse but they were required to act promptly to infringement notifications.

In May 2011, Google cancelled the AdWords advertisement purchased by a Dublin sex worker rights group named "Turn Off the Blue Light" (TOBL), claiming that it represented an "egregious violation" of company ad policy by "selling adult sexual services". However, TOBL is a nonprofit campaign for sex worker rights and is not advertising or selling adult sexual services. After TOBL members held a protest outside Google's European headquarters in Dublin and sent in written complaints, Google reviewed the group's website. Google found the website content to be advocating a political position and restored the AdWords advertisement.

In June 2012, Google rejected the Australian Sex Party's ads for AdWords and sponsored search results for the July 12 by-election for the state seat of Melbourne, saying the Australian Sex Party breached its rules which prevent solicitation of donations by a website that did not display tax exempt status. Although the Australian Sex Party amended its website to display tax deductibility information, Google continued to ban the ads. The ads were reinstated on election eve after it was reported in the media that the Australian Sex Party was considering suing Google. On September 13, 2012, the Australian Sex Party lodged formal complaints against Google with the US Department of Justice and the Australian competition watchdog, accusing Google of "unlawful interference in the conduct of a state election in Victoria with corrupt intent" in violation of the Foreign Corrupt Practices Act.

In December 2019, France fined Google €150 million for advertiser suspensions on Google Ads, arguing it had "abused its dominant position by adopting opaque and difficult to understand rules" which it was then free to "interpret and modify" at its own discretion.

In 2019, the European commission began its fining of Google of €1.49 Billion due to its abuse of its dominant market position, stating that it infringed ‘exclusivity clause’, ‘placement clause’ and ‘prior authorisation clause’ (as referenced by the European General court). However, in 2024, the General Court ruled that Google was not guilty on the grounds that the European commission had not taken the circumstances into proper consideration.Despite this, the legal process is still ongoing as of 2026, with the case having been appealed.

In early 2022, Google suspended all ad sales in Russia in response to the ongoing invasion of Ukraine. Over 1,000 Russian businesses that had purchased pre-paid ads, which were neither delivered nor refunded, joined the bankruptcy proceedings of the Russian Google subsidiary.

In January 2023, the United States Department of Justice (DOJ), along with the attorneys general of several states, filed a civil antitrust lawsuit against Google, alleging that it had monopolised key digital advertising technologies relied upon by website publishers to buy and sell advertisements. Following a 15-day trial in September 2024, the U.S. District Court for the Eastern District of Virginia ruled on 17 April 2025 that Google had illegally monopolised open-web digital advertising markets, finding that Google had "harmed Google's publishing customers, the competitive process, and, ultimately, consumers of information on the open web". The court found that Google had unlawfully tied its DoubleClick for Publishers (DFP) ad server and its AdX ad exchange in violation of the Sherman Antitrust Act. The DOJ subsequently proposed remedies including the sale of AdX and a phased divestiture of DFP. Google stated it disagreed with the verdict and intended to appeal.

In a separate case, on 5 August 2024 U.S. District Judge Amit Mehta ruled in United States v. Google LLC that Google held monopoly power in general search engine services and search text advertising, and had unlawfully used that power to exclude competitors in violation of Section 2 of the Sherman Act. A remedies trial was held in May 2025, and on 2 September 2025 Judge Mehta ordered that Google be prohibited from entering or maintaining exclusive distribution contracts relating to Google Search, Chrome, Google Assistant, and the Gemini app, and required Google to offer search and search text ads syndication services to competitors.

== Controversies ==
=== Trademarked keywords ===
Google has come under fire for allowing AdWords advertisers to bid on trademarked keywords. In 2004, Google started allowing advertisers to bid on a wide variety of search terms in the US and Canada, including trademarks of their competitors and in May 2008 expanded this policy to the UK and Ireland. Until 2023, advertisers were restricted from using other companies' trademarks in their advertisement text if the trademark has been registered with Advertising Legal Support team.

In some American jurisdictions, the use of a person's name as a keyword for advertising or trade purposes without the person's consent has raised Right to Privacy concerns.

In 2013, the Tenth Circuit Court of Appeals held in 1-800 Contacts, Inc. v. Lens.com, Inc. that online contact lens seller Lens.com did not commit trademark infringement when it purchased AdWords and other search advertisements using competitor 1-800 Contacts' federally registered 1800 CONTACTS trademark as a keyword. In August 2016, the Federal Trade Commission filed an administrative complaint against 1-800 Contacts alleging that its search advertising trademark enforcement practices have unreasonably restrained competition in violation of the FTC Act. 1-800 Contacts has denied all wrongdoing and is scheduled to appear before an FTC administrative law judge in April 2017.

=== Use by fossil fuel companies for greenwashing ===
Fossil fuel companies, funders and public relations agencies including ExxonMobil, Shell, Aramco, McKinsey, and Goldman Sachs are among the largest customers of Google Ads. One in five Google Ads for climate-related terms (e.g. net zero, carbon storage, carbon capture and energy transition) were paid by fossil fuel companies. A study by The Guardian and InfluenceMap found that Shell's ads appeared on 86% of searches for "net zero". Over half of users in a 2020 survey could not tell the difference between a normal Google result and a Google Ad. One of the study's authors, InfluenceMap stated "Google is letting groups with a vested interest in the continued use of fossil fuels pay to influence the resources people receive when they are trying to educate themselves. The oil and gas sector has moved away from contesting the science of climate change and now instead seeks to influence public discussions about decarbonization in its favor."

=== Use by Israel ===
In 2024, Israel (during its war on Gaza) was reported to have bought ads to discredit UNRWA.

=== Anti-abortion clinics ===
A report conducted by the Tech Transparency Project found that women from low-income areas in US cities are more likely to be targeted by anti-abortion crisis pregnancy centers than women in wealthier areas of the city. Many of these crisis centers have portrayed themselves as abortion clinics while advocating anti-abortion measures for pregnant women.

The research was conducted in Atlanta, Miami, and Phoenix with women from three different income brackets, using the phrases "abortion clinic near me" and "I want an abortion." According to the results, Phoenix showed a 16% increase in crisis center recommendations from low to middle income, while there was a 49% difference when compared to high-income areas.

=== Funding of misinformation and hate speech ===
A study by the Center for Countering Digital Hate found that The Gateway Pundit, an American far-right fake news website, had earned up to $1.1 million in Google Ad revenue between November 2020 and July 2021. The website was demonetized in September 2021; the decision took place a few days ahead of the airing of a French documentary in which a Google representative was confronted with printouts of ads on the site.

In October 2022, ProPublica reported that Google Ads was a major source of revenue for purveyors of disinformation in Africa, Europe and Latin America. The websites funded by Google promoted Jair Bolsonaro's false claims about voting system integrity in Brazil and COVID-19 and climate change misinformation in French-, German- and Spanish-speaking countries.

In May 2024, non-profit organization Check My Ads reported that Google Ads is funding OpIndia, an Indian far-right website known for promoting conspiracy theories and Islamophobic rhetoric.

=== Malvertising and phishing ===
Google Ads has been exploited by malicious actors to conduct phishing and malvertising campaigns. In January 2025, security researchers reported a campaign in which attackers impersonated Google Ads itself, placing fraudulent advertisements in Google Search results that directed users to fake login pages designed to steal advertiser account credentials and two-factor authentication codes. In response, Google stated that it expressly prohibits ads designed to deceive users and that its teams were investigating the issue.

Google publishes an annual Ads Safety Report detailing its enforcement actions against policy-violating advertisements. According to its 2025 Ads Safety Report, published in April 2026, Google blocked or removed over 8.3 billion ads globally in 2025, up from 5.1 billion the previous year, and suspended 24.9 million advertiser accounts. The company attributed the improved detection rates to its Gemini AI systems, which it said caught over 99% of policy-violating ads before they were shown to users. Of the suspended accounts, 602 million ads and 4 million accounts were linked to scams.

== See also ==
- Google AdSense
- List of Google products
- Search engine marketing
- Advertising network
- Performance-based advertising
- Digital marketing
