= Lynda Carter =

American actress, singer, and beauty pageant titleholder (born 1951)

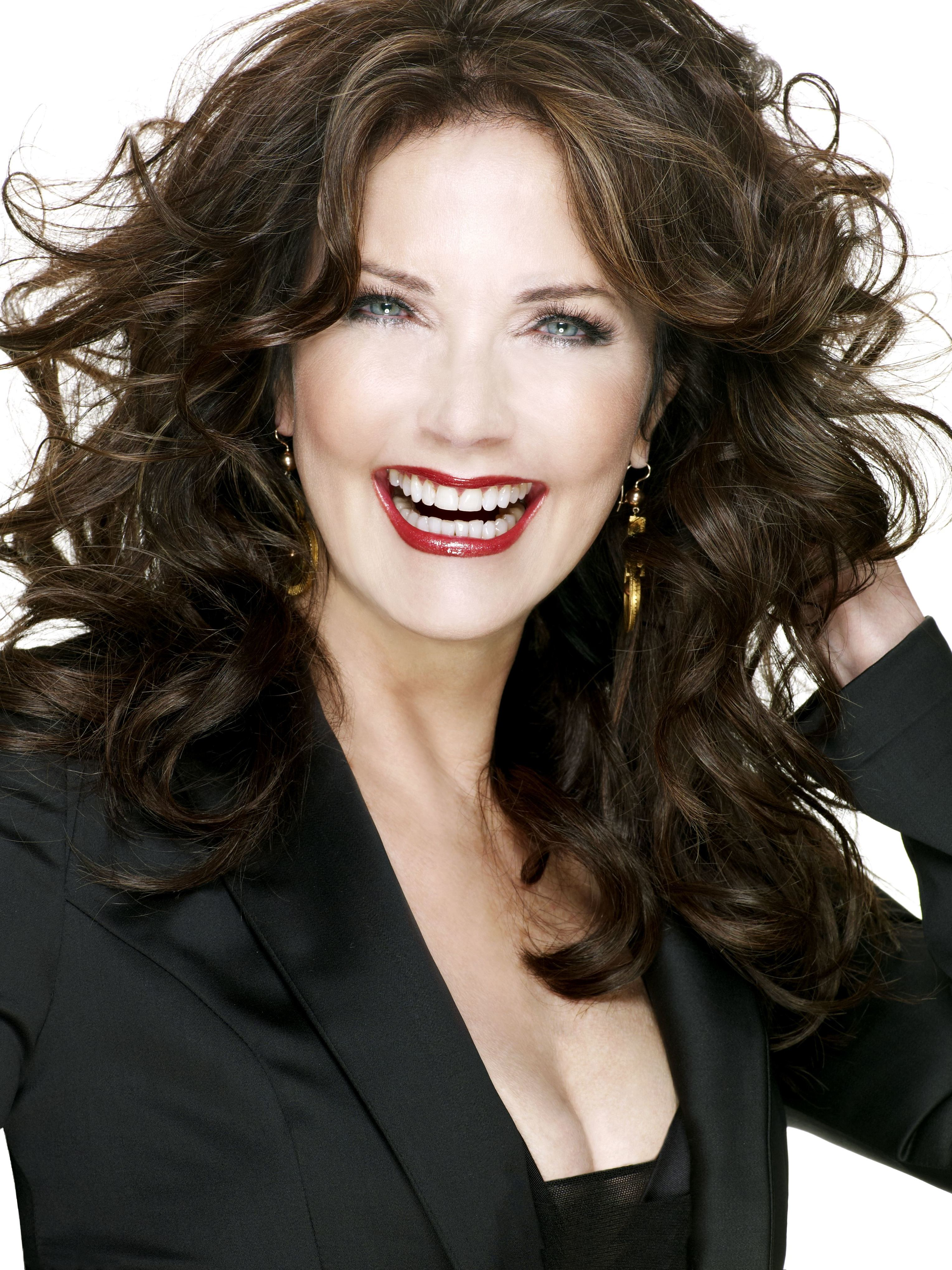
- Carter in 2012
- Born: Lynda Jean Carter; July 24, 1951 (age 75); Phoenix, Arizona, U.S.
- Occupations: Actress; singer
- Years active: 1968–present
- Known for: Miss World USA 1972; Wonder Woman (1975–1979); Maybelline commercials Lens Express commercials
- Political party: Democratic
- Spouses: Ron Samuels (m. 1977; div. 1982) Robert A. Altman (m. 1984; died 2021)
- Children: 2
- Awards: Hollywood Walk of Fame
- Website: lyndacarter.com

Lynda Jean Carter (born July 24, 1951) is an American actress, singer, and beauty pageant contestant, best known for her portrayal of Wonder Woman in the television series Wonder Woman (1975–1979). Before her acting career, she was crowned Miss World USA in 1972, and she finished in the top 15 at the Miss World 1972 pageant.

Carter has appeared in a wide range of films and television series. She appeared in films such as Super Troopers (2001), and Sky High (2005), Super Troopers 2 (2018), and Wonder Woman 1984 (2020), where she made a cameo appearance as Asteria. She also had a recurring role as U.S. President Olivia Marsdin on the series Supergirl (2016–2018). Additionally, she has participated in various television specials and series, including Two and a Half Men (2013), and The Muppet Show (1980).

Carter has received several honors throughout her career. In 2014, she was awarded a Golden Palm Star on the Palm Springs Walk of Stars. In 2016, she received a Lifetime Achievement Award at the Gracie Awards. Carter was also honored with a star on the Hollywood Walk of Fame in 2018. In 2022, she was recognized with the Sor Juana Legacy Award by the National Museum of Mexican Art for her contributions to the arts, and later that year, she was inducted into the California Hall of Fame.

== Early life ==
Carter was born in Phoenix, Arizona, the daughter of Juana (Maiden Name Córdova) and Colby Carter. Her father is of English and Irish ancestry, and her mother, whose family came from Chihuahua, Mexico, is of Mexican, Spanish, and French descent. She has one brother, Vincent, and one sister, Pamela. Carter made her public television debut on Lew King's Talent Show at age 5. During high school, Carter performed in a band called Just Us. The band included a marimba, a conga drum, an acoustic guitar, and a stand-up bass which was played by another girl in the group. At age 15, Carter began singing in the local pizza parlor to earn extra money. When she was 16, she joined two of her cousins in another band called The Relatives. Actor Gary Burghoff was the drummer for the band. The group opened at the Sahara Hotel and Casino lounge in Las Vegas for three months; because Carter was under 21 she had to enter through the kitchen.

In 1970, Carter successfully auditioned for and then sang on tour with The Garfin Gathering and bandleader Howard (Speedy) Garfin. Their first performance together was at the Holiday Inn Chinatown, a San Francisco hotel so new that it had no completed sidewalk entrance. Consequently, they played mostly to the hotel staff and hotel guests who parked their cars in the underground garage. The Garfin Gathering toured the Nevada "Silver Circuit", playing shows in many of the state's casino lounges between Lake Tahoe, Carson City, Reno, and Las Vegas. In 1972, Carter decided to leave the Garfin Gathering to pursue an acting career, returning to Arizona.

== Career ==
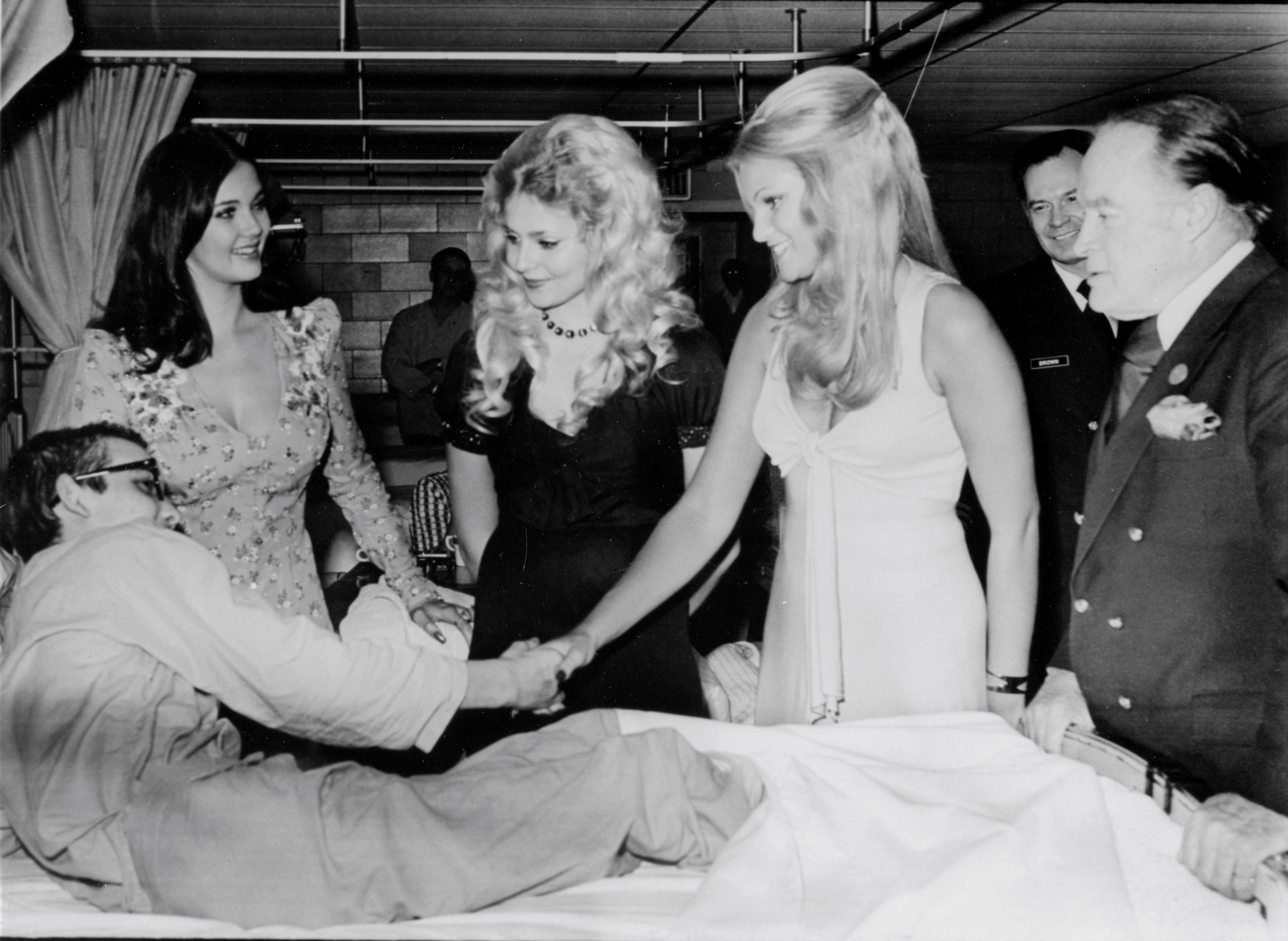
Left to right: Carter as Miss World USA 1972, Priscilla Barnes, Betty Jo Grove, with Bob Hope at the National Naval Medical Center, Bethesda, Maryland

In 1972, Carter won a local Arizona beauty contest and gained national attention in the United States by winning Miss World USA 1972, representing Arizona. In the international Miss World 1972 pageant, representing the United States she reached the Top 15. She took acting classes at several New York acting schools during the early 1970s. One of her acting partners during this time was future CBS president Les Moonves. Carter made her first acting appearance in "Roots of Anger", an episode of the 1974 police drama Nakia. She began making appearances on such TV shows as Starsky & Hutch and Cos, as well as appearances in several "B" movies including the cult classic Bobbie Jo and the Outlaw.

=== Wonder Woman ===
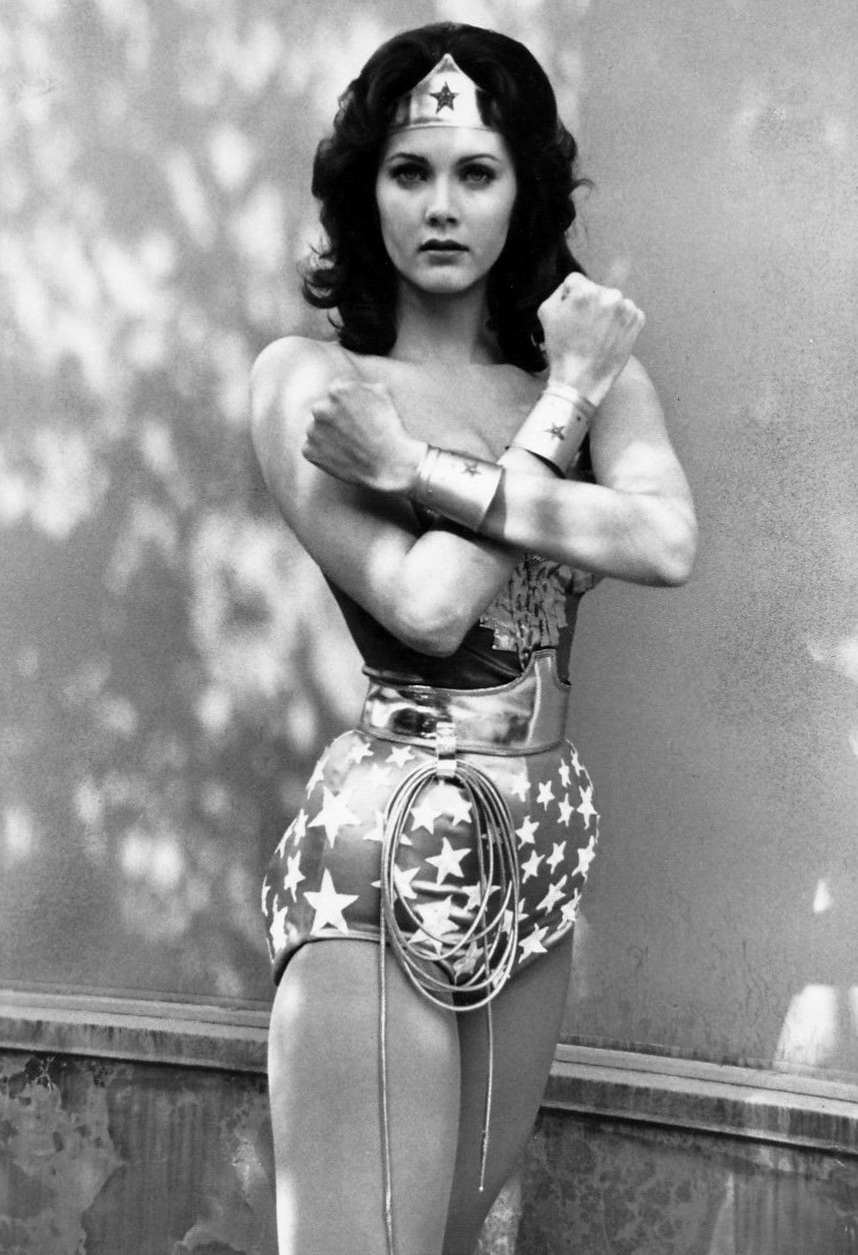
Carter as Wonder Woman in 1976

Carter's acting career took off when she landed the starring role on Wonder Woman in 1975, as the title character and her secret identity, Diana Prince. The savings she had set aside from her days of touring on the road with her band to pursue acting in Los Angeles were almost exhausted. Carter has publicly stated that, on the day she got the part, she had $25 in the bank. She was close to returning to Arizona when her manager informed her that Joanna Cassidy had lost the role and Carter had the part of Wonder Woman. Carter's earnest performance greatly endeared her to both fans and critics. As a result, she continues to be closely identified with Wonder Woman.

The Wonder Woman series lasted for three seasons, from 1975 to 1979. It first aired on ABC, and later on CBS. Carter's performance, rooted in the character's inherent goodness combined with a comic-accurate costume and a catchy theme song, made for a depiction that was considered iconic. After the show ended, Carter told Us that "I never meant to be a sexual object for anyone but my husband. I never thought a picture of my body would be tacked up in men's bathrooms. I hate men looking at me and thinking what they think. And I know what they think. They write and tell me." The 2018 journal article "Casting a Wider Lasso: An Analysis of the Cultural Dismissal of Wonder Woman Through Her 1975-1979 Television Series" argued that the show strongly adapted Wonder Woman's ideals but "was suppressed, undone, and discredited" by American culture as part of a larger legacy suppressing the character.

In 2017, Carter explained her perspective of portraying the Diana Prince/Wonder Woman character. Carter says she got the role back in 1975 largely because she looked the part, which was both a blessing and—as one of the show's producers warned her—a curse, saying that "Oh, women are going to be so jealous of you." Carter had responded, "Not a chance. They won't be, because I am not playing her that way. I want women to want to be me, or be my best friend!". As Carter describes portraying Wonder Woman, "There is something about the character where in your creative mind for that time in your life where you pretended to be her, or whatever the situation was, that it felt like you could fly".

In 1985, DC Comics named Carter one of the honorees, in the company's 50th anniversary publication Fifty Who Made DC Great, for her work on the Wonder Woman series.

In 2007, DC Direct released a 13-inch (330 mm) full-figure statue of Carter as Wonder Woman, limited to 5,000 pieces; it was re-released in 2010. Also in 2010, DC Direct began selling a 5 1/2 in (140 mm) bust of Carter's Wonder Woman to celebrate the 75th anniversary of DC Comics.

During production of the 2017 Wonder Woman feature film, director Patty Jenkins approached Carter to appear in a cameo role in the film, as Carter confirmed, "Patty asked me to do a cameo in this. She was in England, and I was doing my concerts," explaining she had singing engagements that made her unavailable. "At that time we couldn't get our timing together. So, this next time, if she writes me a decent part, I might do it." Carter did make a cameo in the post-credits scene of the sequel film, Wonder Woman 1984 where she plays Asteria, the "Golden Warrior" of the Amazons.

Carter holds dear the new film and the character introduced more than 75 years ago. "Many actresses or actors, they want to divorce themselves from a role because we are actors, we really aren't the people that we play. But I knew very early on that this character is much more than me certainly, and to try to divorce myself from the experiences that other people have of the character is silly," she said.

=== Music and promotional work ===
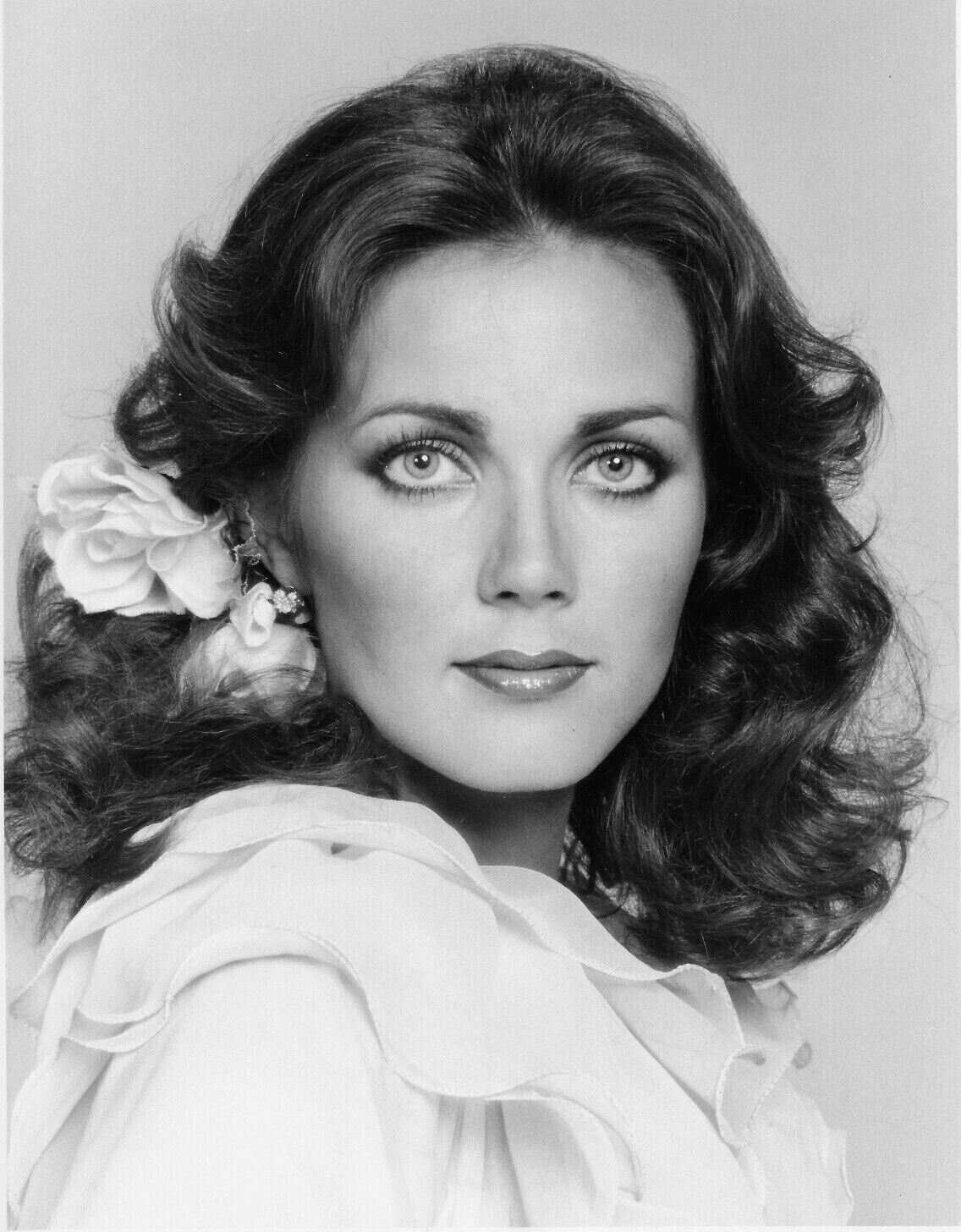
Carter in 1977

While Wonder Woman was being produced, Carter was well recognized and in demand for promotional work. In 1978, Carter was voted "The Most Beautiful Woman in the World" by the International Academy of Beauty and the British Press Organization. She had also signed a modelling contract with Maybelline cosmetics in 1977. In 1979, she appeared in a Diet 7Up commercial along with comedian Don Rickles.

Carter was the first woman to provide a voiceover for a movie trailer, as she did for the 1975 film The Drowning Pool.

Carter continued to pursue her interest in music. During the late 1970s she recorded the album Portrait. Carter is credited in several variety television programs for being a co-writer on several songs and making numerous musical guest appearances. She also sang two of her songs in a 1979 Wonder Woman episode, "Amazon Hot Wax".

In 1977, Carter released a promotional poster through Pro Arts at the suggestion of her then-husband and manager, Ron Samuels. The poster was very successful despite Carter's dissatisfaction with it. In 1981 during an interview on the NBC television special Women Who Rate a 10, she said:

It's uncomfortable because I just simply took a photograph. That's all my participation was in my poster that sold over a million copies, was that I took a photograph that I thought was a dumb photograph. My husband said, "Oh, try this thing tied up here, it'll look beautiful". And the photographer said "the back-lighting is really terrific". So dealing with someone having that picture up in their... bedroom or their... living room or whatever I think would be hard for anyone to deal with.

For Apocalypse Now (1979) she was originally cast in the role of Playboy Playmate Bunny, but the filming of her scenes was interrupted by the storm that wrecked the theater set prompting a delay of nearly two months for rebuilding. By the time director Francis Ford Coppola was ready to shoot again, Carter's contractual obligations to Wonder Woman had forced her back to the States and her scenes were reshot with Colleen Camp. The only evidence remaining of Carter's involvement are the Playboy centerfolds that were specially shot by the magazine as movie props, and a glimpse of Carter's pinup in the Redux version.

=== Life after Wonder Woman: music, film and television ===
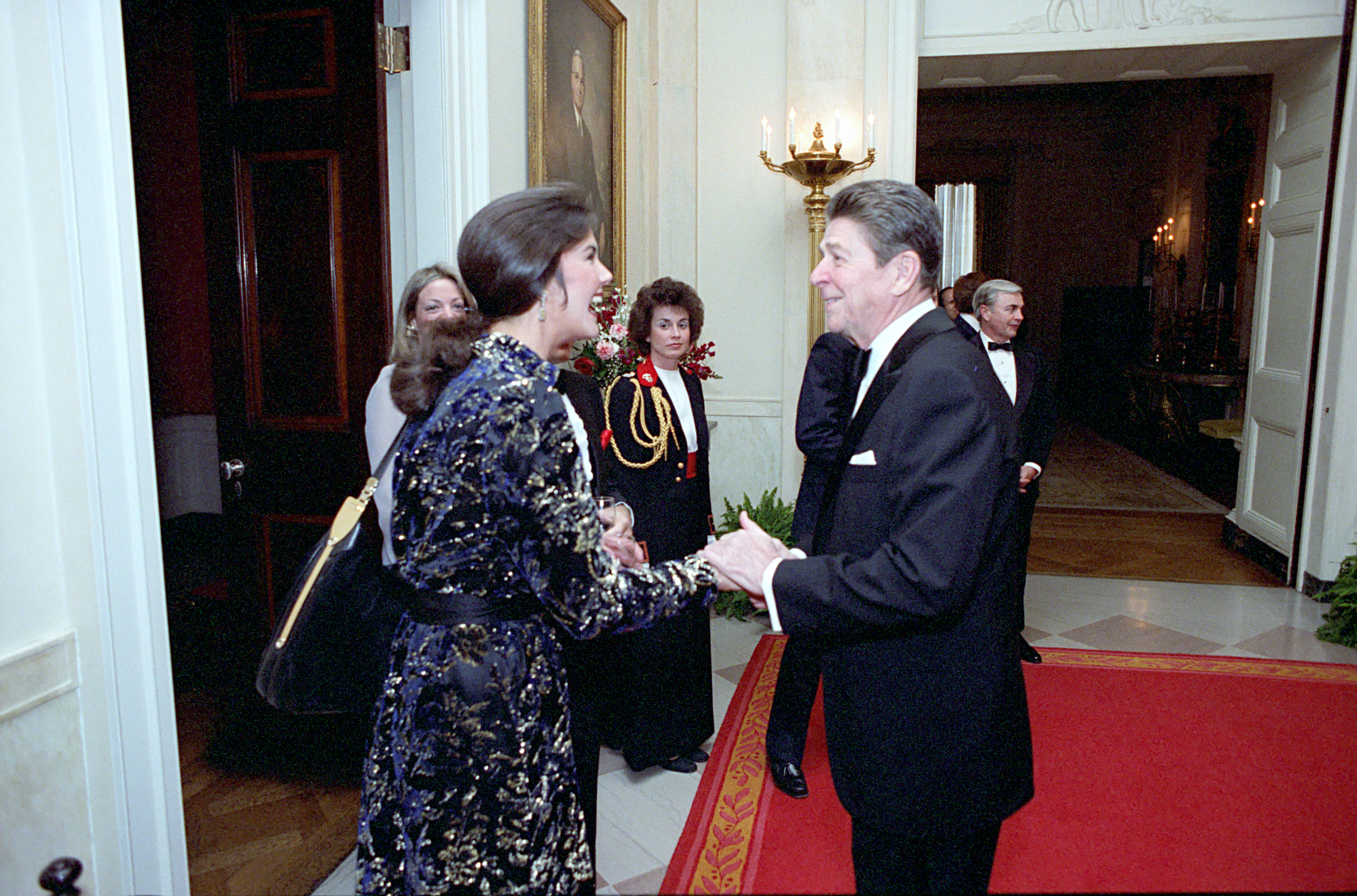
Carter greeting President Ronald Reagan in 1981

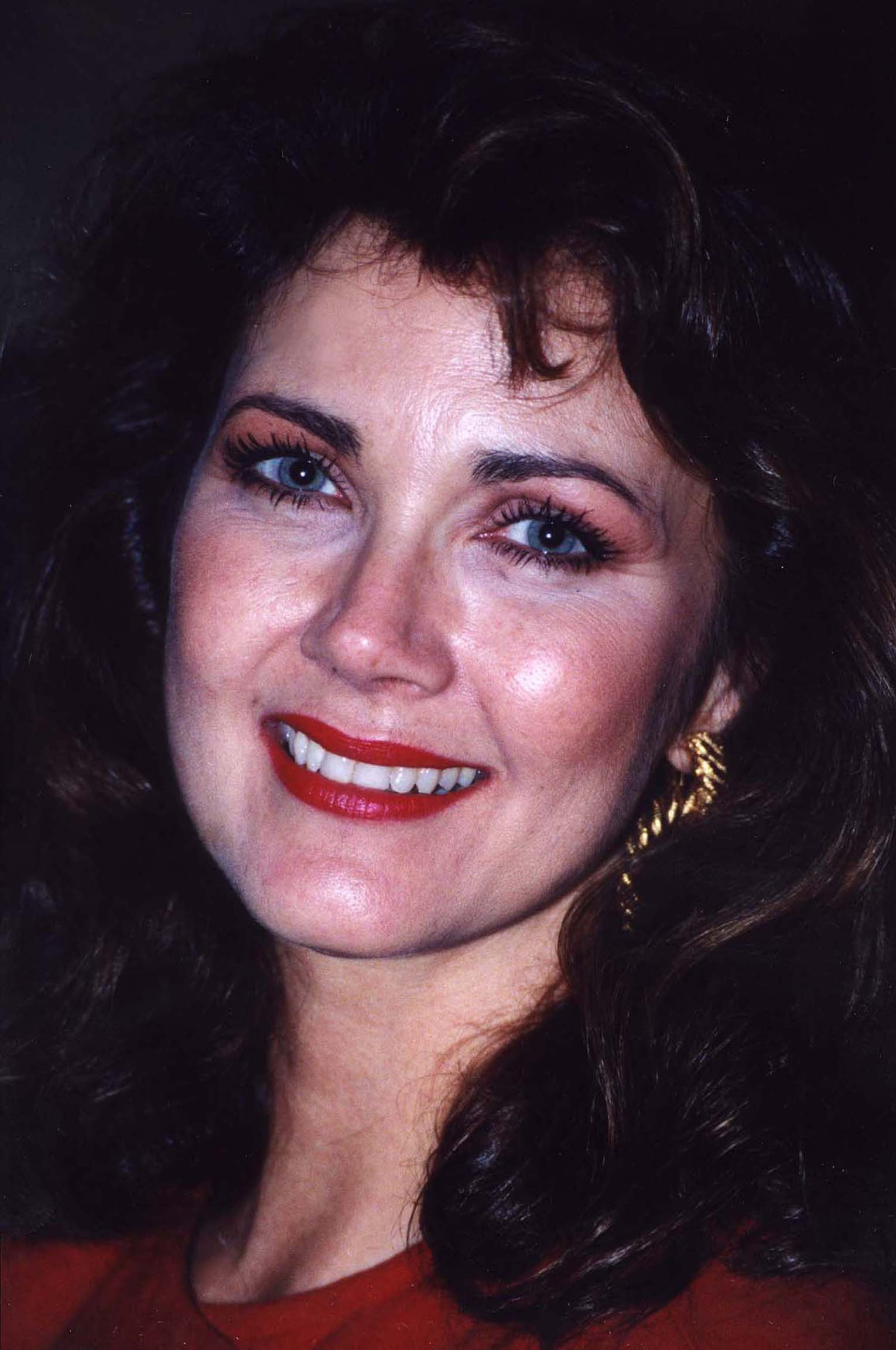
Carter at Larry King's birthday party in 1993

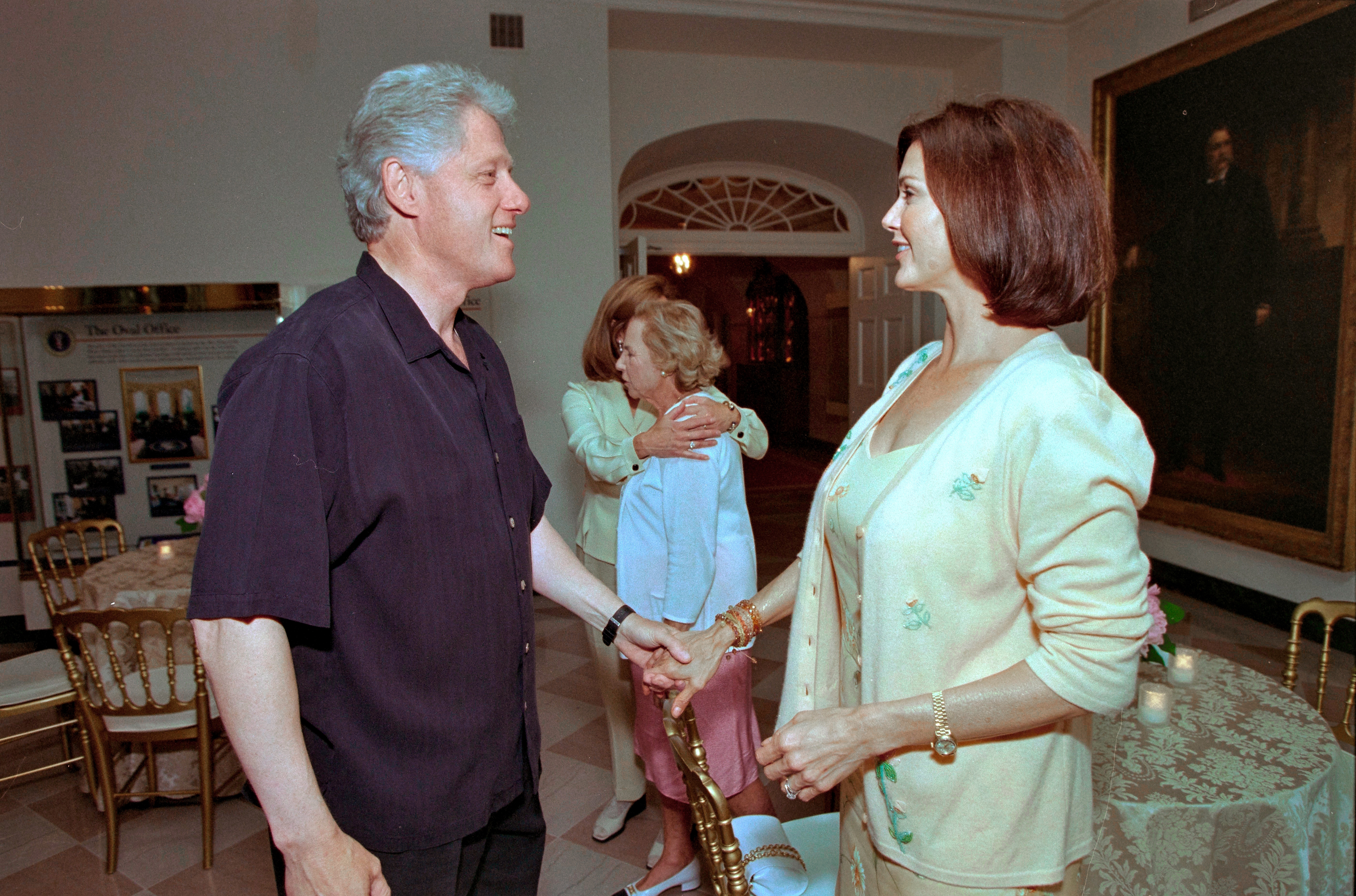
Carter greeting President Bill Clinton at a movie screening outside the Family Theatre of the White House in 2000

After Wonder Woman ended, Carter had many opportunities in music, film, and television. In 1980 Carter initially made a guest appearance on The Muppet Show. In the episode's running gag, Kermit the Frog repeatedly reminds the other Muppets that their guest is Carter and not Wonder Woman. This is to no avail as the Muppets ineptly attempt to become superheroes by taking a correspondence course and Miss Piggy portrays "Wonder Pig", a spoof of Carter's television character.

She was quickly given a variety of her own musical TV specials, including Lynda Carter's Special (1980), Encore! (1980), Celebration (1981), Street Life (1982), and Body and Soul (1984). She landed the title role in a biographical film about actress Rita Hayworth (born Margarita Carmen Cansino) titled Rita Hayworth: The Love Goddess (1983).

Carter's next major role after Wonder Woman was in the crime drama television series Partners in Crime with Loni Anderson in 1984. She then portrayed Helen Durant in the 1989 CBS television film Mike Hammer: Murder Takes All where she booby-traps Las Vegas entertainer Johnny Roman (Edward Winter), her husband Doctor Carl Durant, and his employee accountant Brad Peters (Jim Carrey) causing their deaths.

Throughout the 1990s, Carter appeared in a string of television movies which resulted in a resurgence in television appearances for her. She appeared in commercials for Lens Express (now 1-800 Contacts). Around that time Carter created her own production company, Potomac Productions. In 1993, Carter expanded her performance resume to include voice-over work as the narrator for the Sandra Brown book Where There's Smoke.

=== 21st century ===
Because of the resyndication of Wonder Woman on cable networks like FX and SyFy, Carter participated in two scheduled on-line chat sessions with fans. In 2000, Carter hosted the I Love 1978 episode of BBC2's I Love the '70s. In 2004, she won an award for being the "Superest Superhero" on the Second Annual TV Land Awards the same year. When an announcer reported that an invisible plane was double-parked illegally and needed to be moved before it was towed, she performed her spinning transformation once again after 25 years, although a younger actress wore the star-spangled outfit at that moment.

Carter performed in a variety of film roles, making up a majority of her film work in the 2000s. In 2001, she was cast in the independent comedy feature Super Troopers, as Vermont Governor Jessman. The writers and stars of the film, the comedy troupe Broken Lizard along with the director Jay Chandrasekhar had specifically sought Carter for the role. Inspired by the character detour from her usual roles, she agreed to play a washed-up, former beauty queen in The Creature of the Sunny Side Up Trailer Park (2004) which was directed by Christopher Coppola.

Carter made her first appearance in a major feature film in a number of years in the big-screen remake of The Dukes of Hazzard (2005), also directed by Chandrasekhar. She appeared in Disney's action-comedy film Sky High (2005) as Principal Powers, the headmistress of a school for superheroes. The script allowed Carter to poke fun at her most famous character when she states: "I can't do anything more to help you. I'm not Wonder Woman, y'know." In 2006, she guest-starred in the made-for-cable vampire film Slayer. The following year Carter returned to the DC Comics' television world in the Smallville episode "Progeny" (2007), playing Chloe Sullivan's Kryptonite-empowered mother.

Carter's voice-over work included video games, performing voices for the Nord and Orsimer (Orc) females in two computer games of The Elder Scrolls series beginning in 2002, and including The Elder Scrolls III: Morrowind, The Elder Scrolls IV: Oblivion, and The Elder Scrolls V: Skyrim, as well as playing a singer in a subway-converted bar in 2015's Fallout 4. These games were developed by Bethesda Softworks; her husband Robert A. Altman was chairman and CEO of Bethesda's parent company, ZeniMax Media.

From September to November 2005, Carter played "Mama Morton" in the West End London production of Chicago. In 2006, her rendition of "When You're Good to Mama" was officially released on the Chicago: 10th Anniversary Edition CD box set. In May 2007, Carter began touring the U.S. with her one-woman musical cabaret show, An Evening with Lynda Carter. She played engagements at such venues as Feinstein's at Loews Regency in New York, Jazz at Lincoln Center, the Kennedy Center in Washington, D.C., the Razz Room in San Francisco, and the Catalina Jazz Club in Los Angeles. In June 2009, her second album, At Last was released and reached No. 10 on Billboard's Jazz Albums Chart. In June 2011, Carter released her third album, Crazy Little Things which she describes as a delightful mix of standards, country, and pop tunes. In 2015, Carter wrote and recorded five original songs for the video game Fallout 4 in which she herself stars. An EP of the songs from the game's soundtrack was released on iTunes on November 6, 2015. The song "Good Neighbor" from the EP was nominated by NAVGTR for best song under the category of Song, Original or Adapted. In 2018, Carter released her fourth album titled Red, Rock n' Blues with her All-Star Band which featured two vocals with her daughter, Jessica Altman. She continues to perform her concerts nationally at venues including The Kennedy Center in Washington, D.C., Catalina Jazz Club in Hollywood, Feinstein's at the Nikko in San Francisco, the Franklin Theater in Nashville, and Jazz at Lincoln Center in NYC. Carter performs with her All-Star Band and presents her special guest, Jessica Altman. Jessica released her own EP No Rules in early 2020.

=== Recent work ===
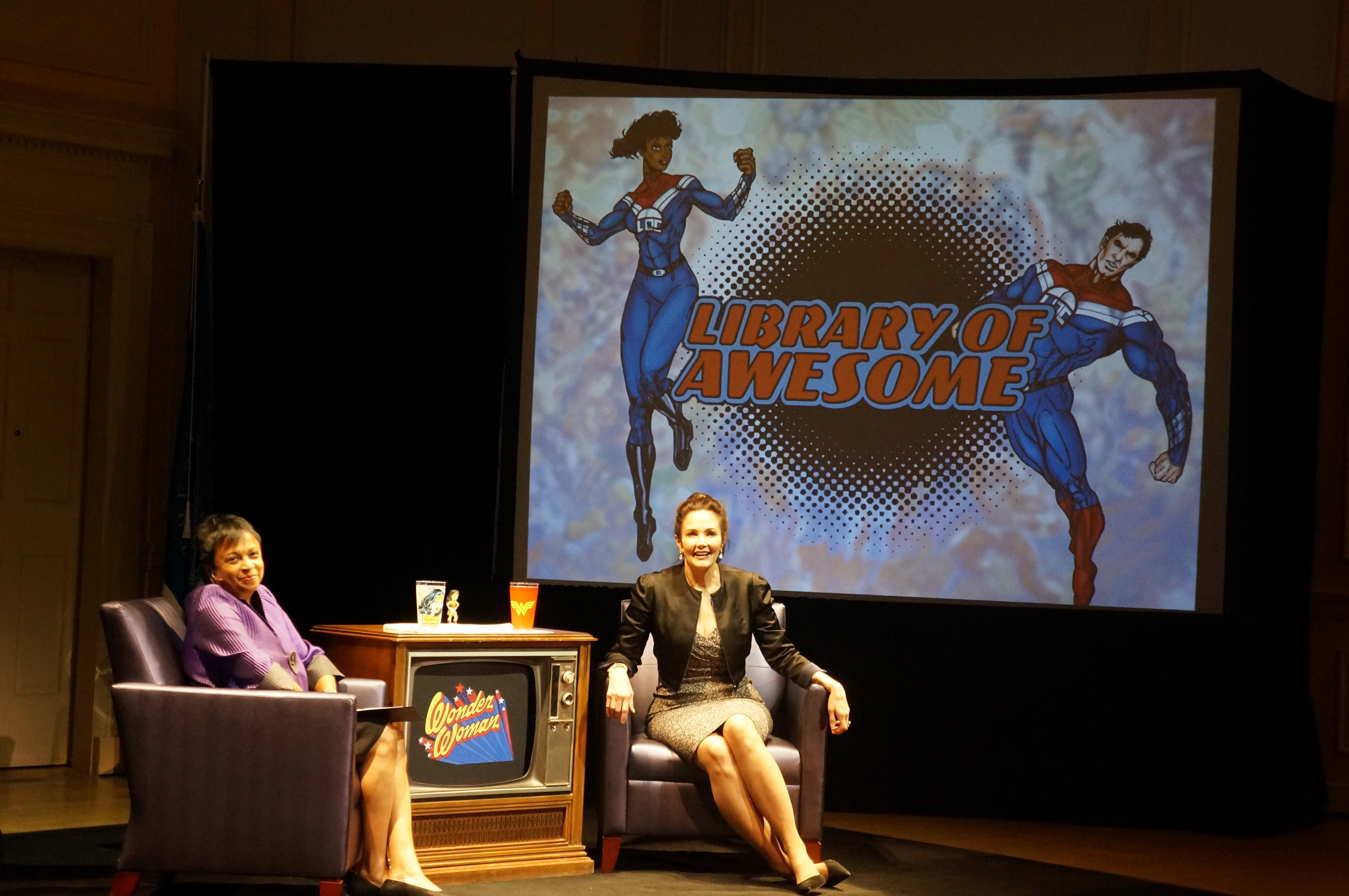
Carla Hayden and Carter at the Library of Congress's Library of Awesome event on the United Nations, the 2017 film Wonder Woman, and feminism (2017)

Carter is among the interview subjects in Superheroes: A Never-Ending Battle, a three-hour documentary narrated by Liev Schreiber that premiered on PBS in October 2013.

Carter, fellow Wonder Woman actress Gal Gadot, DC Entertainment President Diane Nelson, Wonder Woman director Patty Jenkins, and U.N. Under-Secretary General Cristina Gallach appeared at the United Nations on October 21, 2016, the 75th anniversary of the first appearance of Wonder Woman to mark the character's designation by the United Nations as its "Honorary Ambassador for the Empowerment of Women and Girls". The gesture was intended to raise awareness of UN Sustainable Development Goal No. 5, which seeks to achieve gender equality and empower all women and girls by 2030. However the decision was met with protests from UN staff members who stated in their petition to UN secretary-general Ban Ki-moon that the character is "not culturally encompassing or sensitive", and served to objectify women. As a result, the character was stripped of the designation and the project ended on December 16.

In 2017, Carter rejoined the Warner Bros./DC Comics film and television family on the second season of The CW's Supergirl television series in the role of President Olivia Marsdin. Executive producer Andrew Kreisberg described Carter's presence on the show as "a big stand to necessitate Supergirl (Melissa Benoist) and the DEO protecting her".

== Personal life ==
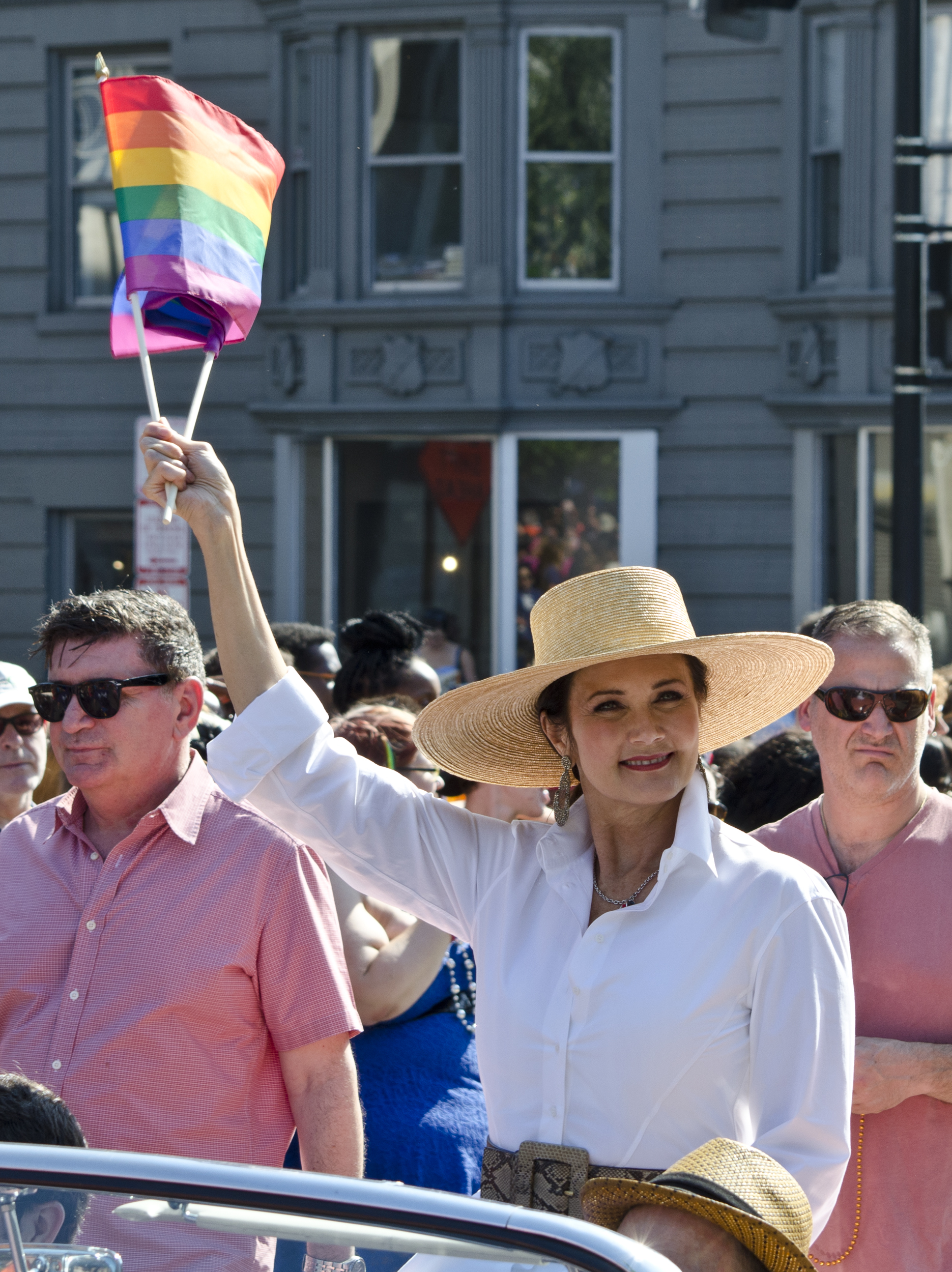
Carter as the Grand Marshal at the Gay Pride parade in Washington, D.C. in 2013

Lynda Carter and French singer Michel Polnareff had a romantic relationship in 1973 before she played the role of Wonder Woman.

Carter has been married twice. Her first marriage was to Ron Samuels, her former talent agent, from 1977 to 1982, a period in which she has publicly stated that she was very unhappy. On January 29, 1984, she married attorney Robert A. Altman, law partner of Clark Clifford and later co-founder CEO of ZeniMax Media. She left Hollywood in 1985 to join her husband in Washington, D.C., for a few years. Carter and her husband have two children including Jessica Carter Altman. The couple lived in a Potomac, Maryland home they built in 1987, shortly before the birth of their son. The 20,000-square-foot (1,800 sq.meters) Georgian-style mansion was profiled in the premiere issue of Closer magazine in November 2013, as well as on HGTV.

Altman's involvement with the Bank of Credit and Commerce International and its secret acquisition of First American Bankshares Inc. led to a lengthy investigation and jury trial though he was ultimately acquitted in 1993. Carter was seen on the TV news with her arm around him, declaring, "Not guilty! Not guilty!" to the gathered reporters.

On February 3, 2021, Altman died at a hospital in Baltimore owing to a battle with myelofibrosis, a rare form of leukemia. He was 73.

Carter is a Democrat who campaigned for Hillary Clinton during the 2016 United States presidential election. She also endorsed Joe Biden in the 2020 presidential election and Kamala Harris in the 2024 presidential election.

In 2003, Carter revealed how her mother had suffered from irritable bowel syndrome for over 30 years, leading to Carter touring the country as an advocate and spokeswoman. Carter is also a staunch advocate and supporter of Susan G. Komen for the Cure, abortion rights, and legal equality for LGBT people. She was the grand marshal for the 2011 Phoenix Pride Parade, the 2011 New York Pride Parades, and the 2013 Capital Pride Parade in Washington, D.C. In 2010 she served as Grand Marshall for the Washington, D.C., AIDS Walk.

In a June 4, 2008, interview with People magazine, Carter stated she had in the past entered a rehabilitation clinic for treatment of alcoholism and had been sober for nearly 10 years. When she was asked what the recovery process had taught her, Carter said that the best measure of a human being is "how we treat the people who love us, and the people that we love".

== Honors ==
In 1985, DC Comics named Carter as one of the honorees in the company's 50th anniversary publication Fifty Who Made DC Great for her work on the Wonder Woman series.

In 2014, a Golden Palm Star on the Palm Springs, California, Walk of Stars was dedicated to Carter's career. Carter's dedication is the 369th honoree on the Palm Springs Walk of Stars.

In 2016, Carter received a Lifetime Achievement Award at the Gracie Awards. The Gracie Awards ceremony is presented by the Alliance for Women in Media Foundation (AWM), since 1975.

On April 3, 2018, the Hollywood Chamber of Commerce (HCC) proudly honored Carter with the 2,632nd star on the Hollywood Walk of Fame. The star is at 6562 Hollywood Boulevard in the television section. HCC President and CEO Leron Gubler unveiled the star with the assistance of guest speakers, director Patty Jenkins and former CBS chairman Leslie Moonves.

On September 17, 2022, the National Museum of Mexican Art in Chicago honored Carter with the Sor Juana Legacy Award for her outstanding contributions to the arts. The Sor Juana Legacy Award recognizes women of Mexican descent for their lifetime achievements.

On December 13, 2022, Carter was inducted into the California Hall of Fame.

== Filmography ==
=== Film ===
Year	Film	Role	Notes
1976	Bobbie Jo and the Outlaw	Bobbie Jo Baker	
1993	Lightning in a Bottle	Charlotte Furber	
2001	Super Troopers	Governor Jessman	a.k.a. Broken Lizard's Super Troopers
2004	The Creature of the Sunny Side Up Trailer Park	Lynette	a.k.a. Creature
2005	Sky High	Principal Powers	
2005	The Dukes of Hazzard	Pauline Powers	
2006	Tempbot	Mary Alice	Short film
2007	Tattered Angel	Hazel Anderson	
2018	Super Troopers 2	Governor Jessman	a.k.a. Broken Lizard's Super Troopers 2
2020	Wonder Woman 1984	Asteria	Cameo; mid-credits scene
2021	The Cleaner	Carlene Briggs	
2026	Super Troopers 3	Governor Jessman	a.k.a. Broken Lizard's Super Troopers 3

=== Television ===
Year	Show	Role	Notes
1974	Nakia	Helen Chase	1 episode
1975	Matt Helm	Bobbi Dee	1 episode
1975	The New Original Wonder Woman	Lead role: Diana Prince / Wonder Woman	TV pilot to the show
1975–1979	Wonder Woman	Diana Prince / Wonder Woman	59 episodes
1976	A Matter of Wife... and Death	Zelda	TV movie
1976	Starsky & Hutch	Vicky	"The Las Vegas Strangler" 2 episodes
1976	Break the Bank	Herself - panelist	TV series, 1 episode
1976	Cos	Herself	TV series, 1 episode
1976–1980	Dinah!	Herself - Guest	TV series, 6 episodes
1976	Battle of the Network Stars	Herself - ABC Team	TV special
1976	A Special Olivia Newton-John	Herself - Wonder Woman	TV special
1976	The Hollywood Squares (Daytime)	Herself - Panelist	TV series, 1 episode
1977	Circus of the Stars	Herself - Performer	TV special
1977	The 34th Annual Golden Globe Awards	Herself	TV special
1977	The Jacksons	Herself - Musical Guest	TV series, 1 episode
1977	CBS Galaxy	Herself - Guest	TV Special, 1 episode
1977	The 29th Annual Primetime Emmy Awards	Herself - Presenter	TV special
1977	Circus of the Stars #2	Herself - Performer	TV special
1978	The 35th Annual Golden Globe Awards	Herself	TV special
1978	Happy Birthday, Bob	Herself	TV special
1978	Grease Day USA	Herself - Premiere Guest	TV special
1978	The 30th Annual Primetime Emmy Awards	Herself - Nominee	TV special
1978	People	Herself	TV series, 1 episode
1979	The 6th Annual American Music Awards	Herself - Presenter	TV special
1979	The Lynda Carter Special	Herself - Host & Singer	TV special
1980	Lynda Carter Encore!	Herself - Host & Singer	TV special
1980	The Last Song	Brooke Newman	TV movie
1980	The Muppet Show	Herself	1 episode
1981	Born to Be Sold	Kate Carlin	TV movie
1981	Lynda Carter's Celebration	Herself - Host & Singer	TV special
1982	Lynda Carter: Street Life	Herself - Host & Singer	TV special
1982	Hotline	Brianne O'Neill	TV movie
1983	Rita Hayworth: The Love Goddess	Rita Hayworth	TV movie
1984	Lynda Carter Body and Soul	Herself - Host & Singer	TV special
1984	Partners in Crime aka Fifty-Fifty	Carole Stanwyck	TV series, 13 episodes
1987	Stillwatch	Patricia Traymore	TV movie
1989	Mike Hammer: Murder Takes All	Helen Durant	TV movie
1991	Daddy	Charlotte Sampson	TV movie a.k.a. Danielle Steel's Daddy
1991	Posing: Inspired by Three Real Stories	Meredith Lanahan	TV movie a.k.a. I Posed for Playboy
1994–1995	Hawkeye	Elizabeth Shields	22 episodes
1996	When Friendship Kills	Kathryn Archer	TV movie a.k.a. A Secret Between Friends: A Moment of Truth Movie
1996	She Woke Up Pregnant	Susan Saroyan	TV movie a.k.a. Crimes of Silence
1997	A Prayer in the Dark	Emily Hayworth	TV movie
1998	Someone to Love Me	Diane Young	TV movie a.k.a. Someone to Love Me: A Moment of Truth Movie a.k.a. Girl in the Backseat
1999	Family Blessings	Lee Reston	TV movie a.k.a. LaVyrle Spencer's 'Family Blessings'
2002	20/20	Herself	TV series, 1 episode
2003	Terror Peak	Dr. Janet Fraser	TV movie
2003	Hope & Faith	Summer Kirkland	1 episode
2005	Law & Order: Special Victims Unit	Lorraine Dillon	2 episodes
2005	Law & Order	Lorraine Dillon	2 episodes
2006	Fox & Friends	Herself	TV series, 1 episode
2006	Slayer	Colonel Jessica Weaver	TV movie
2007	Smallville	Moira Sullivan	Episode: "Progeny"
2007	Where Are They Now?	Guest - Herself (Wonder Woman)	TV series, Australia, 1 episode
2013	Two and a Half Men	Herself	1 episode
2013	Superheroes: A Never-Ending Battle	Herself	Documentary series
2014	Skin Wars	Guest judge	1 episode
2016–2018	Supergirl	U.S. President Olivia Marsdin	Recurring role; 5 episodes
2016, 2020	CBS This Morning	Herself - Guest	TV series, 2 episodes
2017, 2020	Access Hollywood	Herself - Guest	TV series, 3 episodes
2020, 2022	NBC Today Show	Herself - Guest	TV series, 3 episodes
2021	GMA3: What You Need To Know	Herself	TV series, 1 episode
2021	DC FanDome 2021	Herself	TV special
2021	Tamron Hall	Herself - Guest	TV series, 1 episode
2021	The 15th Annual CNN Heroes All-Star Tribute	Herself - Presenter	TV special
2023	The Morning Show	Guest - Herself	TV series, Australia, 1 episode

=== Video games ===
Year	Game	Role	Notes
2002	The Elder Scrolls III: Morrowind	Female Nords	
2003	The Elder Scrolls III: Bloodmoon	Female Nords	
2006	The Elder Scrolls IV: Oblivion	Female Nords, Female Orcs	
2011	The Elder Scrolls V: Skyrim	Gormlaith Golden-Hilt, Azura	
2014	The Elder Scrolls Online	Azura	
2015	Fallout 4	Magnolia	
2017	The Elder Scrolls Online: Morrowind	Azura	
2019	Rage 2	Phoenix	

== Discography ==
=== Studio albums ===
Year	Album title	Label	Catalogue No.	Format
1978	Portrait	Epic Records	JE 35308	LP, MC, CD, Digital Download
2009	At Last	Potomac Productions	PP 4001	CD, Digital Download
2011	Crazy Little Things	Potomac Productions	PP 4003	CD, Digital Download
2015	Fallout 4 (Original Game Soundtrack)	Bethesda Softworks	B01MUFVB97	Digital Download
2018	Red Rock N' Blues	Potomac Productions	PP 4005	CD, Digital Download

=== Singles ===
Year	Title	Label	Catalogue No.	Format
1973	"It Might As Well Stay Monday"/"I Believe In Music"	EMI Records UK	EMI 2005	7" Vinyl
1978	"Toto (Don't It Feel Like Paradise)"/"Put on a Show"	Epic Records	EPIC 8–50569	7" Vinyl
1978	"All Night Song" (Promo)	Epic Records	EPIC 8–50624	7" Vinyl
1980	"The Last Song"/"What's a Little Love Between Friends"	Motown Records UK	TMG 1207	7" Vinyl
2021	"Human and Divine"	Potomac Productions		Digital Download
2023	"Rise Up"	Potomac Productions		Digital Download
2024	"Letters from Earth"	Potomac Productions		Digital Download
2024	"Pink Slip Lollipop"	Potomac Productions		Digital Download

Awards and achievements
Preceded by Brucene Smith	Miss World USA; 1972	Succeeded by Marjorie Wallace
