= Lens Express =

American company

Lens Express, Inc.
- Industry: Direct-mail-order
- Founded: 1985 in Pompano Beach, Florida
- Founders: Engin Yesil and Yalie Golan
- Defunct: 2002
- Fate: Acquired by 1-800 Contacts
- Successor: 1-800 Contacts
- Headquarters: Deerfield Beach, Florida, United States,
- Key people: Lynda Carter, spokesperson
- Products: Contact lenses

Lens Express was a direct-mail-order company that sold contact lenses that were available over-the-phone, and also offered a free catalog. The company was well known for Lynda Carter (TV's Wonder Woman) appearing in its ads, including her famous trademark sayings such as "I wouldn't trust these baby blues to just anyone!" and "Make your life a whole lot easier!". In 2002, Lens Express was acquired by 1-800 Contacts.

== History ==
In 1986 a business administration and finance student of University of Florida, Engin Yesil and his friend Yalie Golan started Lens Express from their Fort Lauderdale apartment. Engin was to have returned to Turkey to manage his father's shoe business, but saw a greater venture in Florida. Unlike other states, Florida provided a better opportunity for growth while still operating within state rules and regulations. This became important since Lens Express, as a company, was breaking ground for consumerism.

In the 1980s the world of contact lens usage was exploding due to the growth of the soft contact lens market. However, access to contact lenses as a product was restricted as it was unsafe for people to purchase products from anyone other than the eye doctor.

On April 2, 1985, WCBS-TV, New York Consumer Editor Betsy Ashton, interviewed by Meredith Vieira, reported on the optometric industry's battle against mail-order contact lens firms. Representing the American Optometric Association, Dr. Paul Farkas argued that mail order contact lenses were unsafe. Conversely, USA Lens founder Dr. Joseph Seriani extolled the virtues of his firm while arguing that many eye doctors' services were superfluous for otherwise healthy patients. The report also mentioned that certain states, including Hawaii, West Virginia, North Carolina, and Minnesota had restraint of trade laws in effect to prevent advertising for contact lenses.

== Launch ==
Until the Federal Trade Commission ruled in 1985, eye doctors (Ophthalmologists and Optometrists) had to provide contact lens prescriptions to their patients so that the patient may shop for contact lenses as a consumer; withholding a contact lens prescription would be considered restraint of trade.

Linda J. Kaplan, an Ophthalmologist, advocated for patient consumerism and joined Lens Express in 1987. As Director of Quality Assurance, the company located to Pompano Beach. No contact lenses were sold to first time users, rather only replacement lenses were sold. Kaplan's advertising campaign for Lens Express was directed at educating the American consumer: "I endorse the Lens Express program because they guarantee to deliver the exact same lenses your own doctor prescribed, while making the purchase of new, fresh replacement lenses, easy and convenient for thousands of men and women across America" Linda Kaplan, MD, PA, FAAO. The message impact of safety, quality and convenience was strong.

In the 1990s Joe Seriani filed a lawsuit against Lens Express charging that founders, Yalie Golan and Engin Yesil, used drug proceeds to start Lens Express. It is unclear if Golan had been involved with USA Lens, but it seems the Florida Attorney General's Office did investigate that company as well. As a result, Kaplan resigned from Lens Express and withdrew her endorsement. Concomitantly, Lynda Carter's husband, Robert A. Altman, a former attorney, made the acquaintance of Engin Yesil. This lead Lens Express to procure the services of former Wonder Woman actress Lynda Carter for the new national television campaign: "I wouldn't trust these baby blues to just anyone!" In 1992 with the withdrawal of older management, Lens Express had developed a business model that could not fail.

== Ownership changes ==
May 1996, Summit Technology acquired Lens Express for $32 million.

In the 1990s Summit Autonomous Inc., was bereft with patent and other business litigation related to their excimer laser systems and procedures. (In 1995, they were the first excimer laser company to receive FDA approval for its excimer laser system for the correction of mild to moderate myopia in the U.S.) Their business model plan for expansion included the owning and operating of vision correction centers, via their subsidiary, Refractive Centers International, Inc. There were 19 such centers in the U.S. many of which were affiliated with prestigious national teaching hospitals. It was thought that additional to the positive cash flow of Lens Express, the acquisition of Lens Express' market base could create a channel for patient flow to convert contact lens wearers into Laser patients.

May 2000 Summit Technology entered into an agreement to sell its Lens Express business unit to Strategic Optical Holdings, Inc. for $31 million cash, plus a minority equity interest in the acquiror.

September 1, 2000 Summit Autonomous, Inc. was acquired by Alcon. and.

November 26, 2002 – Lens 1st, a leading direct to consumer contact lens replacement company owned by Camelot Ventures, a Southfield, Michigan-based investment firm, acquired Lens Express. At that time, Lens Express had sold over 100 million contact lenses to over two million consumers.

December 16, 2002, 1-800 CONTACTS, Inc. signed a letter of intent with Southfield, Michigan-based Camelot Ventures to acquire select assets of Lens Express and Lens 1st, the two leading U.S. mail-order contact lens retailers. Under the terms of the agreement, 1-800 CONTACTS acquired certain assets of Lens Express and Lens 1st, including databases, customer information, web addresses, phone numbers, and intellectual property rights. In addition, acquired assets included certain property, equipment, inventories and other tangible assets with an expected total value at closing of more than $5 million. The consideration to be paid included 900,000 restricted shares of common stock, $6.5 million in cash and the assumption of current liabilities with an expected value at closing of approximately $4.8 million.

January 17, 2008 Wal-Mart Stores Inc. (NYSE: WMT) announced a long-term agreement with 1-800 CONTACTS. The alliance aligns the independent eye doctors located in nearly 3,000 Wal-Mart Stores and Sam's Clubs with 1-800 CONTACTS.
