= Jessica Carter Altman =

American singer-songwriter, lawyer and performer (born 1990)

Jessica Carter Altman (born October 7, 1990) is an American singer-songwriter, lawyer, and performer. She is the daughter of actress Lynda Carter, best known for portraying Wonder Woman in the 1970s television series, and the late Robert A. Altman, a prominent lawyer and video game executive. Blending influences of pop, rock, and soul, Altman has established herself in the music industry with a growing discography and performances at major venues including the Kennedy Center, the Lincoln Center, and the Troubadour, as well as opening concerts for O-Town, the British pop group BBMak and One Tree Hill’s Tyler Hilton.

Her musical output has garnered recognition through national and regional television performances and interviews on the CBS, NBC, ABC, and FOX networks, including appearances on The Today Show, The Tamron Hall Show, and Sharon Osbourne’s The Talk. She was named as one of People Magazine’s “Ones to Watch” in 2021 and has been featured in celebrity magazines and fashion media including OK!, Access Hollywood, Page Six and InStyle.

== Early life and education ==
Jessica Carter Altman was born in Potomac, Maryland, to Lynda Carter and Robert A. Altman. She grew up in a creative household, with her mother being a celebrated actress and singer and her father a successful attorney and founder of ZeniMax Media, the owners of Bethesda Softworks and their Fallout and Elder Scrolls video game franchises. As a child, she would play with her mother's Wonder Woman memorabilia, including the Lasso of Truth and the Bracelets of Submission, which were kept in a family display cabinet.

== Music career ==
She released her debut EP, No Rules, in 2020, showcasing a blend of modern pop with introspective songwriting. She then left law to pursue music full time and a series of singles and EPs followed, leading up to the release of her debut album Aftermath in 2024. Earlier that year she completed tours opening for BBMak (whom she'd met through opening for O-Town in 2021) as well as Tyler Hilton.

Her collaborations have included studio and live duets with Lynda Carter, as well as working with the American alternative rock band Wheatus on an acoustic rendition of their 1990s signature hit “Teenage Dirtbag”.

== Law and advocacy ==
Carter Altman practiced law at Gibson, Dunn & Crutcher and has remained active in philanthropic legal efforts since leaving the firm in 2020.

== Personal life ==
She married Dr. Ross Martin Uhrich, an oral and maxillofacial surgeon turned biotechnology investor, in May 2023 at Villa del Balbiano in Ossuccio, Italy. The couple had met in 2017.

== Discography ==
=== Studio Albums ===
- Aftermath (2024)

=== EPs ===
- Aftermath I (2023)
- Aftermath II (2024)
- For You (2022)
- No Rules (2020)

=== Singles ===
- “Trick Of The Light” (2025)
- “Mirror Mirror” (2025)
- “Clumsy (Wedding Version)” (2024)
- “Fake It” (2024)
- “Bad Energy” (2024)
- “Naïve” (2023)
- “Pieces” (2023)
- “Blood Moon” (2022)
- “For You” (2022)
- “Cherry Blossoms” (2022)
- “Lucky One” (2022)
