= DITTO =

Ditto
- Type: Private
- Industry: Software
- Founded: 2011
- Founder: Kate Endress, Sergey Surkov, Dmitry Kornilov
- Headquarters: Oakland, CA,
- Products: Virtual try-on software
- Website: luna.io

Ditto (stylized as DITTO) was a company that sold software that enabled eyewear companies to sell their products online using virtual fitting. Originally Ditto was a retailer that sold designer prescription eyeglasses and sunglasses. The company was originally based in San Francisco, CA before moving to Oakland, CA in 2018. It used virtual fitting technology to let customers try on eyeglass frames from a computer. The technology measured a customer's face by homing in on pupils, ears, cheekbones, ears and other facial landmarks, and then produced images of dozens of different pairs of glasses that might be a good fit.

== History ==
Ditto was founded in 2011 in Mountain View, CA by Kate Endress, Sergey Surkov, and Dmitry Kornilov.

In April 2012, the company announced that it had picked up $3 million in funding from a group of investors led by August Capital.

At the end of February 2017, Ditto sent an email to its customers explaining that its online eyewear e-commerce and eyewear distribution would be closing down. They continued to license their virtual try-on technology to other eyewear retailers.

In 2021, the company was acquired by 1-800 Contacts and rebranded as Luna Solutions, LLC.

In October 2023, Ditto Technologies, Inc. was acquired by Fittingbox, a French company specializing in eyewear virtual try-on technology.

== Products ==
Ditto's product line included prescription and non-prescription designer eyeglasses and sunglasses. The company carried brands such as Ray-Ban, Persol, Chloé, TAG Heuer, and Vera Wang, as well as niche fashion and boutique brands like Jason Wu, Selima Optique, Alain Mikli, Anglo American, and John Varvatos.

== Patent infringement lawsuits ==
In May 2013, Ditto was sued by 1-800 Contacts and Lennon Imaging Technology for patent infringement.

The Electronic Frontier Foundation claimed that 1-800 Contacts abused patent law by acting like a patent troll in its lawsuit against Ditto. In a blog post, the EFF accused 1-800 Contacts of "leveraging the massive expense of patent litigation to squelch the competition" and asked its followers to help Ditto by crowdsourcing prior art.

The lawsuit by Lennon Imaging Technologies was dismissed on October 7, 2013, without prejudice.
