= Jonathan C. Coon =

American businessman

- Born: 1970 (age 55–56)
- Education: Brigham Young University (B.A.)
- Occupations: CEO and co-founder of 1-800 Contacts
- Relatives: Jeremy Coon (brother)

Jonathan C. Coon is an American businessman who is the former CEO and co-founder of 1-800 Contacts. He received his B.A. in Advertising and Public Relations in 1994 from Brigham Young University. While a student there, Coon created a small business selling contact lenses to other students. In 1995, his business model helped him win the 1995 Business Plan Competition hosted by BYU's Marriott School of Management, which awarded him capital to help grow his business (originally named 1-800-LENS-NOW) into 1-800 Contacts. Coon is a member of The Church of Jesus Christ of Latter-day Saints.

Coon was the recipient of the 2000 Ernst & Young National Entrepreneur of the Year Award and served on the Utah Valley State College Board of Trustees. He is also a founding member of the BYU Center for Entrepreneurship.

Coon sold 1-800 Contacts for $900 million in 2012, financed Napoleon Dynamite, and later founded Austin Capital Partners, which is currently developing Four Seasons Private Residences Lake Austin.
