= Portrait (Lynda Carter album) =

Studio album by Lynda Carter
- Released: May 1978
- Recorded: Late 1977-Early 1978
- Genre: Pop
- Label: Epic
- Producer: Vini Poncia

Lynda Carter chronology
Portrait (1978)	At Last (2009)

Portrait is the first album by the American actress Lynda Carter. It was released in 1978 on vinyl LP, 8-track and cassette as well as a limited edition picture LP. Carter co-wrote three of the songs: "Want to Get Beside You," "Fantasy Man" and "Toto (Don't It Feel Like Paradise)". The album also included the cover songs "She's Always a Woman" by Billy Joel and "Just One Look" by Doris Troy. Promotional singles were released for "All Night Song" and "Toto (Don't It Feel Like Paradise)."

Two of the songs were featured in and performed by Carter's character, Diana Prince in the 1979 Wonder Woman episode, "Amazon Hot Wax": "Want to Get Beside You" and "Toto (Don't It Feel Like Paradise)". The latter song makes mention of several elements from the Wizard of Oz stories, and quotes dialogue from the 1939 film.

Portrait was issued on CD by Wounded Bird Records in 2013 with two previously unreleased bonus tracks. The LP is downloadable on iTunes

Carter did not release another album for over 30 years, due in part to focusing on her acting career and family life though she did occasional singing gigs. Her second album At Last containts jazz and blues standards, was released in June 2009. A third album, Crazy Little Things followed in 2011.

== Reception ==
In a retrospective review for AllMusic, Timothy Monger wrote that Carter possessed enough talent as a vocalist to be taken seriously beyond her Wonder Woman fame: "Her voice is tuneful and pleasantly husky and the material is delivered with confidence." Monger ranked the album 3 stars out of 5 and wrote its main failing, however, was too many mediocre songs that made the album competent but undistinguished.

== Track listing ==
1. "All Night Song" (Bob Siller) – 4:47
2. "She's Always a Woman" (Billy Joel) – 3:09
3. "Tumbledown Love" (Don Dunn, Bob Siller) – 4:44
4. "Just One Look" (Gregory Carroll, Doris Payne) – 2:34
5. "Fantasy Man" (Lynda Carter, C. Siller) – 4:39
6. "Lines" (Don Dunn, Art Munson) – 4:20
7. "Want to Get Beside You" (Lynda Carter, Don Dunn, Art Munson) – 4:06
8. "You're the Only One Who Understands" (Charles Clinton Smith) – 4:22
9. "Put On a Show" (Bob Siller) – 3:44
10. "Toto (Don't It Feel Like Paradise)" (Lynda Carter, C. Siller, Bill Cuomo) – 3:31

== Personnel ==
- Lynda Carter – vocals

with:

- Bill Cuomo – keyboards
- Clark Garman – guitar
- Art Munson – guitar
- Colin Cameron – bass
- Ralph Humphrey – drums
- Don Dunn – backing vocals
- The Faragher Brothers – backing vocals
- Wendy Haas – backing vocals
- Brie Howard – backing vocals
- Jeanie Arnold Saviano – backing vocals
- Bob Siller – backing vocals
- Chuck Smith – backing vocals
- Barry Fasman – arranger, conductor
- Tom Saviano – arranger
- Bob Schaper – engineer
- Vic Anesini - Mastering and remastering.
