= Lens.com, Inc. v. 1-800 Contacts, Inc. =

2012 US Supreme court case

- Court: United States Court of Appeals for the Federal Circuit
- Full case name: Lens.com, Inc., Appellant, v. 1-800 Contacts, Inc., Appellee.
- Decided: August 3 2012
- Citation: 686 F.3d 1376

Case history
- Prior history: 92,049,925 (USPTO (2011))

Holding
- A trademark granted in connection with "computer software" can be considered abandoned if the registered holder merely uses the computer software in a manner that is "incidental" to its retail sales of other goods. Computer software used in that manner may, as a determination of fact, not be considered a "good" that is "sold or transported in commerce" for the purposes of 15 U.S.C. § 1127.

Court membership
- Judges sitting: Pauline Newman, Richard Linn, Kimberly Ann Moore

Case opinions
- Majority: Linn, joined by a unanimous court

Laws applied
- 15 U.S.C. § 1064, 15 U.S.C. § 1127 (Lanham Act)

Lens.com, Inc. v. 1-800 Contacts, Inc., 686 F.3d 1376 (Fed. Cir. 2012), is a decision by the United States Court of Appeals for the Federal Circuit which ruled that when software merely acts as a "conduit" for providing services over the internet, and does not have an independent value per se, it does not constitute a "good" being "sold or transported in commerce" for the purposes of establishing whether or not a trademark for "computer software" has been "abandoned" under 15 U.S.C. § 1064 and 15 U.S.C. § 1127 (the relevant sections of the federal Lanham Act.)

The case was important because it clarified the Federal Circuit's view of the "use in commerce" requirement for trademarks when a non-traditional use of the trademark was employed. This had implications for trademark holders who held "computer software"-related intellectual property and sold goods over the internet. This also affected trademark holders who used their marks in non-traditional manners, or those whose marks were inappropriately described in the trademark filing.

== Background of the case ==
The parties were both competing retailers of contact lenses and related products. In 2001, Lens.com had attempted to register the trademark LENS in connection with "retail store services featuring contact eyewear products rendered via a global computer network." The United States Patent and Trademark Office (USPTO) rejected the application, citing the prior registration of the same trademark by another company in connection with "computer software featuring programs used for electronic ordering of contact lenses in the field of ophthalmology, optometry and opticianry." Lens.com was eventually assigned this prior-registered trademark by the other company as part of the settlement of a lawsuit. However, Lens.com did not proceed to register the trademark LENS in connection with retail store services as it had previously attempted to do. It continued selling contact lenses to consumers through its website.

In 2008, the appellee/plaintiff 1-800 Contacts filed an application with the Trademark Trial and Appeal Board (TTAB) to cancel the LENS trademark, alleging among other things that the appellant/defendant Lens.com had abandoned the trademark because it had never sold or engaged in the trade of "computer software". In 2010, the TTAB agreed, stating that Lens.com's "software [wa]s merely incidental to its retail sale of contact lenses, and [wa]s not a ‘good in trade,’ i.e., "solicited or purchased in the market place for [its] intrinsic value."

Lens.com's motion for a reconsideration of its decision was denied by the TTAB later in 2010, and the USPTO shortly thereafter proceeded to cancel the trademark. Lens.com appealed the cancellation decision to the Federal Circuit Court, which issued its decision on August 3, 2012.

== Decision ==
The Court found in favour of the appellee/plaintiff, 1-800 Contacts, affirming the decision of the TTAB below it.

The fact that Lens.com did not sell software was not contested in the appeal. Thus, under 15 U.S.C. § 1127(1)(B), the only way in which Lens.com could prove it was using the trademark and had not abandoned it would be to prove that its software was "transported in commerce." Citing In re Shareholders Data, 495 F.2d 1360, 1361 (CCPA 1974), the Court found that an article would not qualify as such when that article is "simply the conduit through which [the applicant] renders services." Further, it recalled the "well-established" principle from Shareholders Data that when an article "has no independent value apart from the services, such article is not likely to be an independent good in trade."

Despite a glut of precedent regarding "goods in trade" used in conjunction with services, the Court noted the lack of precedent in the internet services context on the issue of whether such service providers' software was an "independent good in commerce", and therefore properly the subject of a trademark in its own right, or "merely incidental" to the services over the internet, and therefore not. The Court stated that the case of Planetary Motion, Inc. v. Techsplosion, Inc., 261 F.3d 1188, 1194 (11th Cir. 2001), showed that in some cases the distribution of software over the internet could satisfy the requirement. However, it held that such a determination should be made on a factual, case-by-case basis. The Court also affirmed that the applicable test was "whether the software: (1) is simply the conduit or necessary tool useful only to obtain applicant's services; (2) is so inextricably tied to and associated with the service as to have no viable existence apart there from; and (3) is neither sold separately from nor has any independent value apart from the services".

Applying these principles to the case at hand, the Court found that Lens.com's software was "merely the conduit" for its online retail sales services, and was "inextricably intertwined" with it. The Court found "no evidence" that the software had any "independent value." It distinguished Planetary Motion because the nature of the software at issue, a webmail site called "Coolmail", was different than any "software" used by Lens.com to sell its contact lenses over the internet. In Planetary Motion, consumers associated the mark Coolmail with the software itself, whereas in Lens.com's case, consumers associated the mark LENS with the contact lens service, not the software. Thus, it concluded that Lens.com's trademark was not in "use in commerce" in association with software, thereby affirming the decision of the TTAB below to cancel the trademark.

Finally, the Court did not accede to Lens.com's second avenue of argument, that the TTAB had erroneously relied on only part of Lens.com's application file in making its decision. Based on the record of the decision below, the Court found that the TTAB had properly considered the entire application file.

== Subsequent developments ==
While this case was ongoing, the two parties were also embroiled in other trademark litigation. Approximately one year following this decision, the Court of Appeals for the Tenth Circuit decided another controversy between 1-800 Contacts and Lens.com, this time over the latter's use of its competitor's trademark in Google adwords as a means of redirecting customers to its own website. The Tenth Circuit held that Lens.com did not commit trademark infringement when it purchased search advertising using 1-800 Contacts' federally registered 1800 CONTACTS trademark as a keyword.

In August 2016, the Federal Trade Commission filed an administrative complaint against 1-800 Contacts alleging, among other things, that its search advertising trademark enforcement practices have unreasonably restrained competition in violation of the FTC Act. 1-800 Contacts has denied all wrongdoing and is scheduled to appear before an FTC administrative law judge in April 2017.

== See also ==
- 1-800 Contacts
