= At Last (Lynda Carter album) =

Studio album by Lynda Carter
- Released: June 2009
- Genre: Jazz
- Label: Potomac Productions
- Producer: Lynda Carter

Lynda Carter chronology
| Portrait (1978) | At Last (2009) | Crazy Little Things (2011) |

At Last is the second studio album by actress and singer Lynda Carter, released on June 9, 2009, her first album in 31 years.

== Track listing ==
1. "You Send Me" (Sam Cooke) – 3:47
2. "Where Did Our Love Go" (Lamont Dozier, Brian Holland, Eddie Holland) – 3:44
3. "'Deed I Do" (Walter Hirsch, Fred Rose) – 2:10
4. "Million Dollar Secret" (Helen Humes, Justin Taub) – 3:34
5. "Cry Me a River" (Arthur Hamilton) – 3:56
6. "Secret of Life" (James Taylor) – 3:01
7. "Blues in the Night" (Harold Arlen, Johnny Mercer) – 3:41
8. "Come Rain or Come Shine Medley" (Harold Arlen, Kern Hammerstein, Johnny Mercer) – 3:38
9. "At Last" (Mack Gordon, Harry Warren) – 2:51
10. "Summer Time" (George Gershwin, Ira Gershwin, DuBose Heyward) – 2:30
11. "Cloudburst" (Jimmy Harris) – 2:39
12. "Oldies Medley" (Dorothy Fields, Herman Hupfeld, Jerome Kern, Ray Noble) – 3:39

== Personnel ==
- Wayne Bergeron – trumpet
- Lynda Carter – executive producer
- John Carter Cash – producer
- Johnny Harris - producer
- Charlie Chadwick – bass
- Pete Christlieb – clarinet, saxophone, woodwind
- Melodie Crittenden – backing vocals
- Robert O' Donnell – trumpet
- Peter Erskine – drums
- Daniel Fornero – trumpet
- Larry Hall – trumpet
- Tony Harrell – organ, guitar, piano, keyboards
- Johnny Harris – arranger
- Jim Hoke – flute, arranger, saxophone, woodwind
- David Hungate – bass
- Alexander Iles – trombone
- Munyungo Jackson – percussion
- Alan Kaplin – bass trombone
- Kyle Lehning – engineer, mixing
- Paul Leim – percussion, drums, producer, project coordinator
- Kimberly Levitan – package design
- Kerry Marks – guitar
- Keith Munyan – photography
- Sangwook "Sunny" Nam – mastering
- Robert O'Donnell, Jr. – trumpet
- Dean Parks – guitar
- Andy Reiss – guitar
- Michael Rhodes – bass
- Lisa Silver – backing vocals
- Harry Stinson – drums
- Chuck Turner – engineer
- Cindy Walker – backing vocals
- Ken Wild – bass
- Casey Wood – assistant

== Charts ==
| Chart (2009) | Peak position |
|---|---|
| Billboard Jazz Albums | 6 |
