= Superheroes: A Never-Ending Battle =

- Genre: Television documentary
- Developed by: Michael Kantor
- Written by: Michael Kantor
- Screenplay by: Michael Kantor
- Story by: Michael Kantor
- Directed by: Michael Kantor
- Narrated by: Liev Schreiber
- Music by: Christopher Rife
- Country of origin: United States
- Original language: English
- No. of episodes: 3

Production
- Executive producer: Michael Kantor
- Producers: Michael Kantor, Sally Rosenthal
- Cinematography: Mead Hunt (Episode 1)
- Editors: Kris Liem (2 episodes, 2013) Pamela Scott Arnold (1 episode, 2013)
- Running time: 3 hours
- Budget: $2 million

Original release
- Network: PBS
- Release: October 15, 2013

Superheroes: A Never-Ending Battle is a 2013 three-part American television documentary series about superheroes written and directed by Michael Kantor and narrated by actor Liev Schreiber. The production company was Ghost Light Films and Oregon Public Broadcasting and funded in part by the National Endowment for the Humanities. The three-hour series features interviews with over fifty comic book artists, creators and actors. The series was originally broadcast over a single evening.

== Interviewees ==
- Stan Lee (comic book writer and publisher)
- Mark Waid (comic book writer)
- Grant Morrison (comic book writer)
- Jim Lee (comic book artist)
- Todd McFarlane (comic book creator and artist)
- Andrea Romano (voice director)
- Marv Wolfman (comic book writer)
- Neal Adams (comic book artist)
- Daniel Fingeroth
- Bradford Wright
- Denny O'Neil (comic book writer and editor)
- Jim Steranko (comic book artist)
- Jenette Kahn (comic book editor and publisher)
- Arlen Schumer
- Carmine Infantino (comic book artist)
- Michael Chabon (author)
- Len Wein (comic book writer and editor)
- Joe Quesada (comic book writer and artist)
- Adam West (actor)
- Jules Feiffer (cartoonist and author)
- Ramona Fradon (comic book artist)
- Gerry Conway (comic book writer)
- William F Foster III
- Lynda Carter (actress)
- Trina Robbins (comic book artist)
- Adriane Lenox (actress)
- Gerard Jones (author and comic book writer)
- Jeph Loeb (comic book writer and author)
- Geoff Johns (comic book writer)
- Jerry Robinson (comic book artist)
- Louise Simonson (comic book writer and editor)
- Walt Simonson (comic book writer and artist)
- Ashley Miller (screenwriter)
- Paul Dini (comic book writer and creator)
- Irwin Hasen (cartoonist)
- Zack Snyder (film maker)
- Chris Claremont (comic book writer)
- Larry Hama (comic book writer and artist)
- Christina Strain (comic book colorist and writer)
- Mark Evanier (comic book and television writer)
- Joe Simon (comic book artist, writer and creator)

== Home media ==
Superheroes: A Never-Ending Battle was released on DVD on October 15, 2013.

== Book ==
Superheroes!: Capes, Cowls, and the Creation of Comic Book Culture by Laurence Maslon and Michael Kantor is the companion book to the series. It was published by Crown Archetype and released on October 1, 2013. The book, according to director and producer Michael Kantor, "covers lots of characters and stories...we had to cut from the film."

== Reception ==
The New York Daily News noted that "'Superheroes' brings PBS into the comic book world the way its pledge-drive specials bring PBS into the pop music world, with quality productions that keep things clean and tidy." Washington Post reviewer Michael Cavna called the series "engaging" and noted that "[the] filmmakers smartly set their narratives against the shifts in American life", while The Hollywood Reporter noted that the series was "[a]n engaging historical survey of comics."

Staff writer Jessica Fisher of the Kennesaw State University official student newspaper The Sentinel recognized that its a "fascinating study for fans of comics".
