= People (TV series) =

Canadian documentary television series

- Genre: Documentary
- Country of origin: Canada
- Original language: English
- No. of seasons: 1

Production
- Producer: David Marcus-Roland
- Running time: 30 minutes

Original release
- Network: CBC Television
- Release: 9 July – 3 September 1955

People is a Canadian documentary television series that aired on CBC Television in 1955.

== Premise ==
Topics featured in this series included neighbourhood life in Toronto's Chinatown and Rosedale areas, Montreal's Saint Joseph's Oratory, the development of the Saint Lawrence Seaway and a Toronto veterinary clinic.

== Scheduling ==
This half-hour series was broadcast Saturdays at 7:00 p.m. from 9 July to 3 September 1955.
