= 1-800 Contacts =

American contact lens retailer

1-800 Contacts Inc.
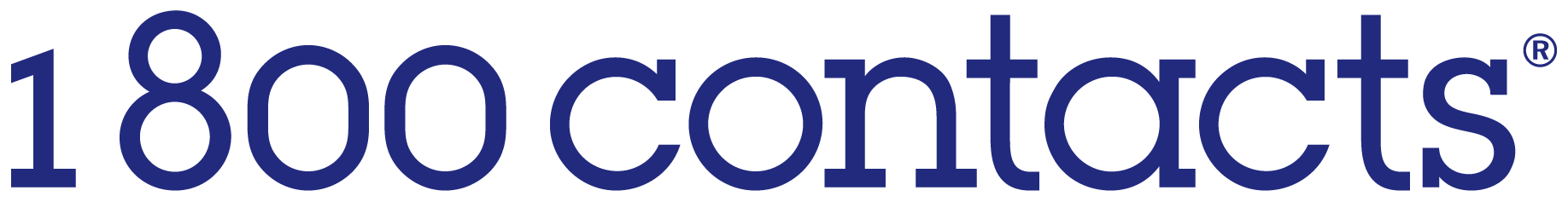
- Type: Private
- Industry: Contact lens retail
- Founded: February 1995; 31 years ago
- Founders: Jonathan C. Coon; John F. Nichols
- Headquarters: Draper, Utah, U.S.
- Key people: John Graham, CEO; Phil Bienert, President, CMO; Brett Gappmayer, CFO; Douglas Harris, COO; Amy Larson, President, New Business; Roy Montclair, General Counsel
- Products: Contact lenses
- Revenue: $237 million (2005)
- Operating income: $5.7 million (2005)
- Net income: $2.6 million (2005)
- Owners: KKR
- Website: 1800contacts.com

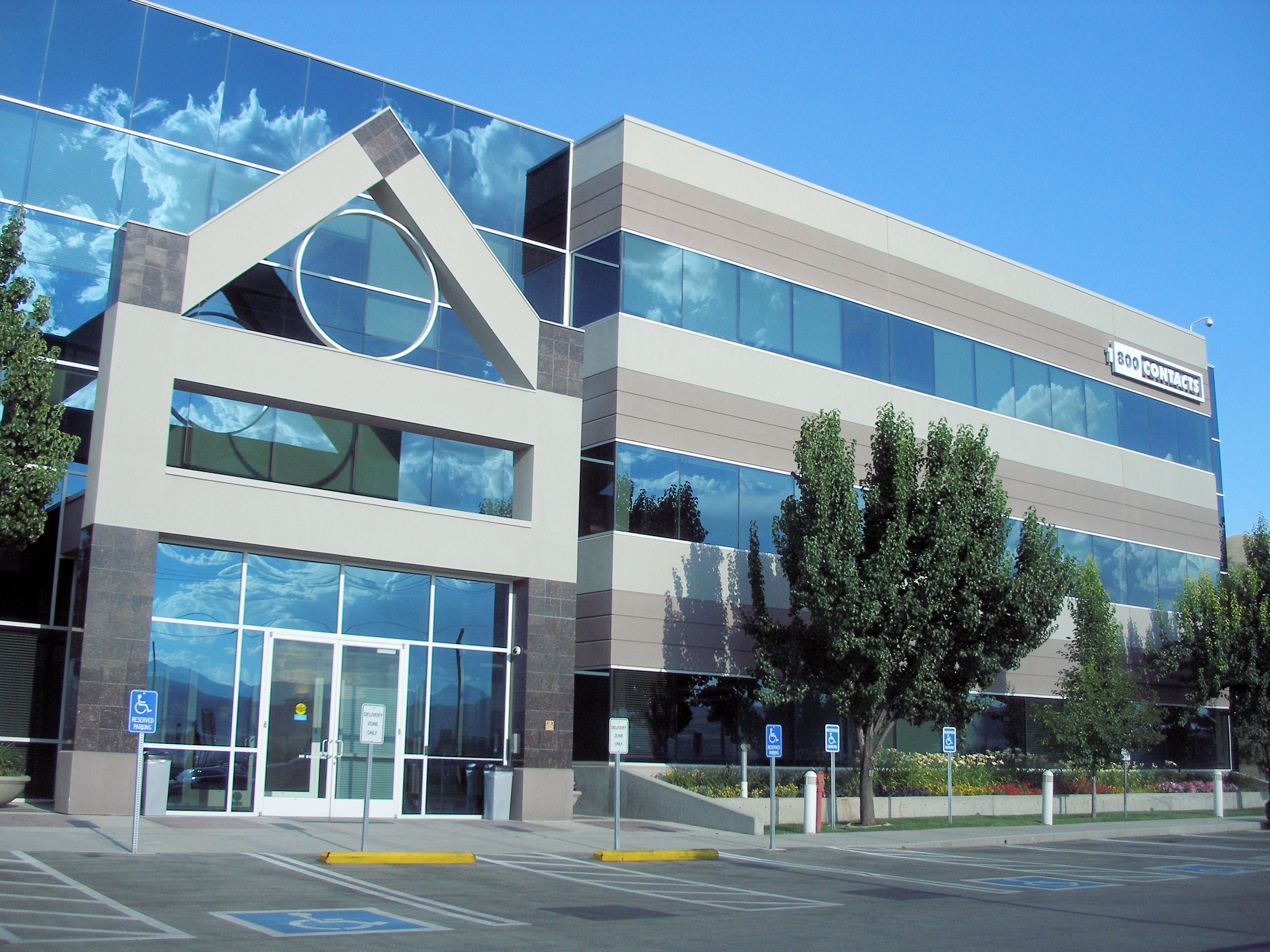
Former 1-800 Contacts headquarters in Draper

1-800 Contacts Inc. is an American contact lens retailer based in Draper, Utah. The brands that 1-800 Contacts sells include Johnson & Johnson Vision Care, Alcon, Bausch & Lomb and CooperVision. The company was founded as the industry's first way to buy contacts online and has since expanded to provide online prescription renewals, glasses, lens replacements, and the in-house AquaSoft Daily contact lenses brand. In 2006, its last year as a public company, the company reported net sales of US$247 million.

== History ==
1-800 Contacts was founded in 1995 by Jonathan C. Coon and John F. Nichols, and was incorporated in February that year. The company held an IPO in 1998 on NASDAQ with the symbol CTAC with an offer price of $27.5M and share price of $12.50. They acquired Lens Express in 2002.

Over the years, 1-800 Contacts has been owned by several companies. In June 2007, 1-800 Contacts was acquired by Fenway Partners for $24.25 per share. In June 2012, 1-800 Contacts was sold to WellPoint (now Anthem). In 2013 Wellpoint sold 1-800 Contacts to Thomas H. Lee Partners and glasses.com to Luxottica. AEA Investors acquired a majority interest in 1-800 Contacts in December 2015.

In 2008, 1-800 Contacts entered into a partnership with Walmart to integrate phone and Internet orders for contact lenses with eye-doctor services and operations in Walmart's stores, The agreement ended in 2013. In June 2013, 1-800 Contacts launched glasses.com, a domain which the company has held since 1999.

== Acquisitions ==
=== Liingo ===
In 2017, 1-800 Contacts acquired Liingo, which is an eyewear brand. Liingo Eyewear was founded in October 2016, in Draper, Utah.

=== 6over6 ===
In 2019, 1-800 Contacts acquired 6over6, which is a digital healthcare technology that enables consumers to perform their own vision tests from anywhere using a computer or smartphone.

=== Ditto ===
In 2021, 1-800 Contacts acquired Ditto. Ditto's technology allows shoppers to realistically try-on eyewear and receive frame recommendations.

== Lawsuits ==
=== WhenU lawsuit ===
1-800 Contacts sued WhenU over pop-up advertisements in 2002. In the suit against WhenU, which also named Vision Direct as a co-defendant, 1-800 Contacts alleged that the advertisements provided by WhenU, which advertised competitors of 1-800 Contacts (such as Vision Direct) when people viewed the company's web site, as "inherently deceptive" and one that "misleads users into falsely believing the pop-up advertisements supplied by WhenU.com are in actuality advertisements authorized by and originating with the underlying Web site".

In December 2003, Judge Deborah Batts of the United States District Court for the Southern District of New York granted a preliminary injunction, barring WhenU from delivering the advertisements to some web surfers, on the grounds that it constituted trademark infringement violating the Lanham Act. WhenU appealed, and the United States Court of Appeals for the Second Circuit held that WhenU's actions did not amount to the "use" that the Lanham Act requires in order to constitute trademark infringement.

The appeals court reversed the preliminary injunction and ordered the dismissal of all claims made by 1-800 Contacts that were based upon trademark infringement, leaving the claims based upon unfair competition and copyright infringement. The district court had already found that 1-800 Contacts was unlikely to prevail in its copyright infringement claims, finding that "the conduct neither violated [the] plaintiff's right to display its copyrighted website, nor its right to create derivative works therefrom".

The Electronic Frontier Foundation criticized the case, stating that it was "not to help [people] fight off adware and spyware" but was rather intended to allow companies "to gain control over [a computer's] desktop", where the legal principles being employed "would create a precedent that would enable trademark owners to dictate what could be open on your desktop when you visit their websites". At the time of the appeal, it filed an amicus curiae brief urging the Appeals Court to limit the reach of the "initial interest confusion" doctrine that had been applied by the District Court.

In addition to the WhenU case, 1-800 Contacts has been involved in other trademark infringement suits revolving around the issue of keyword advertising. On March 8, 2010, 1-800 Contacts sued Contact Lens King, Inc. Ezcontacts.com for trademark infringement based on their use of "1-800 CONTACTS" trademarks as keywords to trigger sponsored ads directing consumers to Contact Lens King's website and products.

=== Lens.com lawsuit ===
1-800 Contacts was also involved in several lawsuits against Lens.com, Inc., including a trademark cancellation case in the United States Court of Appeals for the Federal Circuit, Lens.com, Inc. v. 1-800 Contacts, Inc., in which the Court determined that Lens.com's trademark "LENS", held in connection with "computer software", had been abandoned because Lens.com merely used software to sell contact lenses over the internet, while consumers had no association between the trademark and computer software.

In 2013, the Tenth Circuit Court of Appeals held that Lens.com did not commit trademark infringement when it purchased search advertisements using 1-800 Contacts' federally registered 1800 CONTACTS trademark as a keyword. In August 2016, the Federal Trade Commission filed an administrative complaint against 1-800 Contacts alleging, among other things, that its search advertising trademark enforcement practices have unreasonably restrained competition in violation of the FTC Act. 1-800 Contacts has denied all wrongdoing. On June 11, 2021, the Second Circuit vacated the FTC's request.

=== DITTO and FTC lawsuits ===
On April 17, 2013, the Electronic Frontier Foundation claimed that 1-800 Contacts abused patent law by acting like a patent troll in its lawsuit against DITTO. In a blog post, the EFF accused 1-800 Contacts of "leveraging the massive expense of patent litigation to squelch the competition" and asked its followers to help DITTO by crowdsourcing prior art.

On August 8, 2016, the Federal Trade Commission filed an administrative complaint charging that 1-800 Contacts, the largest online retailer of contact lenses in the United States, unlawfully orchestrated a web of anti-competitive agreements with rival online contact lens sellers that suppress competition in certain online search advertising auctions and that restrict truthful and non-misleading internet advertising to consumers.

According to the administrative complaint, 1-800 Contacts entered into bidding agreements with at least 14 competing online contact lens retailers that eliminate competition in auctions to place advertisements on the search results page generated by online search engines such as Google and Bing. The complaint alleges that these bidding agreements unreasonably restrain price competition in internet search auctions, and restrict truthful and non-misleading advertising to consumers, constituting an unfair method of competition in violation of federal law.

In an initial decision entered on October 27, 2017, and announced on October 30, 2017, Chief Administrative Law Judge D. Michael Chappell upheld a Federal Trade Commission complaint against 1-800 Contacts, ruling that the FTC has proved that the nation's largest online retailer of contact lenses unlawfully orchestrated a web of anti-competitive agreements with rival online contact lens sellers.

An order Judge Chappell included with the initial decision would bar 1-800 Contacts from agreeing with a marketer or seller of any contact lens product to restrict, prohibit, regulate or otherwise limit that seller's participation in search advertising auctions, and would also bar 1-800 Contacts from instructing search engines to restrict or prohibit any seller's use of any keyword (a word or phrase used to instruct a search engine to display specified search advertising), or to require any seller to use any negative keyword (a word or phrase used to instruct a search engine not to display specified search advertising).

Also under the order, 1-800 Contacts would be barred from agreeing with a seller to restrict, prohibit, regulate or otherwise limit that seller's use of truthful, non-deceptive, and non-trademark-infringing advertising or promotion. The order would also require the company to stop enforcing or attempting to enforce any and all provisions, terms, or requirements in any existing agreement or court order that impose a condition on a seller that would be inconsistent with the order.
