= Robert A. Altman =

American businessman (1947–2021)

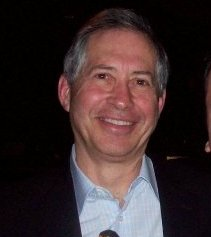
- Altman in 2009
- Born: Robert Alan Altman; February 23, 1947; Washington, D.C., U.S.
- Died: February 3, 2021 (aged 73); Baltimore, Maryland, U.S.
- Education: University of Wisconsin (AB); George Washington University (JD)
- Occupations: Businessman, lawyer
- Known for: ZeniMax Media
- Spouse: Lynda Carter (m. 1984)
- Children: 2

Robert Alan Altman (February 23, 1947 – February 3, 2021) was an American lawyer and video game executive. He worked as a lawyer in Washington, D.C., and was involved in a scandal surrounding the Bank of Credit and Commerce International. In 1999, he and Christopher Weaver founded ZeniMax Media as the parent holding company for Bethesda Softworks, a video game developer Weaver had founded earlier. Altman served as ZeniMax Media's chief executive officer and chairman until his death. He was also a member of the advisory board of the George Washington University Law School.

== Early life ==
Robert Alan Altman was born in Washington, D.C., on February 23, 1947. His father, Norman S. Altman (–1997), was a graduate of Harvard Law School, a real estate lawyer and investor, a government lawyer during the New Deal, and a co-founder of the law firm Krooth and Altman. His mother, Sophie B. Altman (née Robinson; –2008), was a graduate of Yale Law School, a television producer, and created the program It's Academic in 1961. Robert A. Altman had three sisters: Janet R. Spragens (–2006), Susan Altman, and Nancy Altman.

Robert A. Altman was raised in the Cleveland Park neighborhood of Washington, D.C., and graduated from Woodrow Wilson High School. He obtained a bachelor's degree in political science at the University of Wisconsin in 1968 and returned to D.C. to attend George Washington University Law School, where he was editor of its law review and earned a Juris Doctor degree in 1971.

== Career ==
=== Law office ===
Altman practiced law for many years in Washington, D.C., as a partner of Clark Clifford, a former United States Secretary of Defense in the law firm of Clifford and Warnke. Altman later opened his own law firm, the Law Offices of Robert Altman where Clifford was of counsel. As a Washington, D.C., attorney, Altman represented major companies before federal regulatory agencies, before Congress, or in litigation.

From 1978 to 1982, Altman and Clifford represented a group of wealthy Arab businessmen, including members of the royal family from Abu Dhabi and Saudi Arabia in their efforts to acquire a multi-state bank holding company, Financial General Bankshares. The Arab investors used a British bank, Bank of Credit and Commerce International (BCCI) as their financial advisor in this transaction. Following the acquisition, Altman became President of Financial General which was renamed First American Corporation.

=== BCCI trial ===
In 1991, it was alleged that BCCI, the financial adviser to the Arab shareholders and their "communications link" had acquired by means of offshore loans that were in default, the shares of the Arab investors in First American. Questions were raised whether the Arab investors had falsely represented to bank regulators the true ownership of First American. During the ensuing investigations, Altman and Clifford testified at length before Congress, federal and state grand juries, and the Federal Reserve. Audits of First American by the Federal Reserve, Office of the Comptroller, and state banking agencies confirmed that the bank had been operated under Altman's management without any BCCI influence.

In 1992, Clifford and Altman were charged in indictments by the New York District Attorney and the Department of Justice, as well as being named in a civil suit by the Federal Reserve. Clifford, then in poor health, was severed from the case as he was physically unable to go to trial. Altman maintained his innocence, refused offers of a plea to resolve the cases, and insisted on going to trial. In the summer of 1993, after a five-month trial, the court dismissed the central count in the indictment of bribery, saying no evidence had been presented by the government to support it. Altman declined to present a defense case and was acquitted by the jury of all remaining charges. The Department of Justice dismissed the companion federal indictment. The civil suit by the Federal Reserve was settled with Altman agreeing to be banned permanently from banking. He was defended by the famous white-collar criminal defense lawyer Gustave Newman.

Altman and Clifford's BCCI defense cost was $10 million. The cost of the BCCI investigation by the government was $20 million.

=== ZeniMax Media ===
After the BCCI trial, Altman resumed his Washington, D.C., legal practice. In 1999, he co-founded ZeniMax Media with Bethesda Softworks founder Christopher Weaver as a new parent company of Bethesda. Altman was brought in as CEO with Weaver serving as CTO. Weaver was pushed out of an operational role in 2002, and he filed a related lawsuit that was settled out of court.

Altman being the partner of Clark Clifford used his connections as a lawyer to stack ZeniMax's advisory board with such high-profile political figures like Terry McAuliffe, George J. Mitchell and Tony Coelho with McAuliffe and Mitchell joining the advisory board in 2000 while Coelho joined in 2001.

== Personal life ==
Lynda and I first met along with Robert and Bill when we were privileged to be house guests together at the governor’s mansion in Kentucky during the Kentucky Derby.

— Hillary Clinton

Altman was Jewish. On January 29, 1984, he married former Wonder Woman actress Lynda Carter. Together they had two children: Jessica and James. They lived in Potomac, Maryland. James Altman worked at his father's ZeniMax subsidiary Bethesda Softworks as the Director of Publishing Operations.

In 1999, both Robert and Lynda were Democratic National Committee Dinner Co-Hosts.

In 2015, both Robert Altman and his wife endorsed Hillary Clinton for president. Altman and Carter have been family friends with the Clintons since 1983–1984.

=== Death ===
On February 3, 2021, Altman died at a hospital in Baltimore of myelofibrosis, a rare type of leukemia, at the age of 73. Bethesda Softworks announced his death the day after.

== Publications ==
- Altman, Robert A. (1970). The Upper Division College. Jossey-Bass. ISBN 9780875890654.
