= Burn rate (disambiguation) =

Burn rate is another term for negative cashflow in economics. It may also refer to:

- Burn rate (chemistry), the rate at which a reactant is consumed
- Burn rate (rocketry), the rate at which a rocket is burning fuel
- Burn Rate, a nonfiction book
