= Web banner =

Type of advertising

A web banner or banner ad is a form of advertising on the World Wide Web delivered by an ad server. This form of online advertising entails embedding an advertisement into a web page. It is intended to attract traffic to a website by linking to the website of the advertiser. In many cases, banners are delivered by a central ad server. This payback system is often how the content provider is able to pay for the Internet access to supply the content in the first place. Usually though, advertisers use ad networks to serve their advertisements, resulting in a revenue-sharing system and higher quality ad placement.

Web banners function the same way as traditional advertisements are intended to function: notifying consumers of the product or service and presenting reasons why the consumer should choose the product in question, a fact first documented on HotWired in 1996 by researchers Rex Briggs and Nigel Hollis. Web banners differ in that the results for advertisement campaigns may be monitored real-time and may be targeted to the viewer's interests.

Many web surfers regard web advertisements as annoying because they distract from a web page's actual content or waste bandwidth. In some cases, web banners cover screen content that the user wishes to see. Newer web browsers often include software "adblocker" options to disable pop-ups or block images from selected websites. Another way of avoiding banners is to use a proxy server that blocks them, such as Privoxy. Web browsers may also have extensions available that block banners, for example Adblock Plus for Mozilla Firefox, or AdThwart for Google Chrome and ie7pro for Internet Explorer.

== History ==
The banner ad played a significant role in enabling the rapid development of paid advertising on the Internet.

The pioneer of online advertising was Prodigy, a company owned by IBM and Sears at the time. Prodigy used online advertising first to promote Sears products in the 1980s, and then other advertisers, including AOL, one of Prodigy's direct competitors. Prodigy was unable to capitalize on any of its first mover advantage in online advertising. The first clickable web ad (which later came to be known by the term "banner ad") was sold by Global Network Navigator (GNN) in 1993 to Heller, Ehrman, White, & McAuliffe, a now defunct law firm with a Silicon Valley office. GNN was the first commercially supported web publication and one of the first commercial websites.

For many years, HotWired was regarded as the inventor of the digital banner ad, and the first web site to sell banner ads in large quantities to a wide range of major corporate advertisers. Andrew Anker was HotWired's first CEO. Rick Boyce, a former media buyer with San Francisco advertising agency Hal Riney & Partners, spearheaded the sales effort for the company. HotWired coined the term "banner ad" and was the first company to provide click through rate reports to its customers. The first web banner sold by HotWired was paid for by AT&T Corp. and was put online on October 27, 1994. Another source also credits HotWired and October 1994, but has Coors' "Zima" campaign as the first web banner. In May 1994, Ken McCarthy mentored Boyce in his transition from traditional to online advertising and first introduced the concept of a clickable/trackable ad. He stated that he believed that only a direct response model—in which the return on investment of individual ads was measured—would prove sustainable over the long run for online advertising. In spite of this prediction, banner ads were valued and sold based on the number of impressions they generated.

However, Time Warner's Pathfinder (website), which launched on October 24, 1994, the same week as HotWired, but three days earlier included banner ads. Walter Isaacson, then President of Time Inc. New Media, and the Columbia Journalism Review, both credit Bruce Judson, then General Manager of Time Inc. New Media, with inventing the concept of the banner ad. In an interview for Harvard's Shorenstein Center for Media, Politics and Public Policy, on the history of the Internet, Isaacson discussed Judson's contribution, saying, "It really transformed everything. Immediately, Madison Avenue decided, 'Oh my God, we’ve got to understand this. We have to hire a lot of young people.' They would send us money. It was almost like you could look out of the Time-Life Building to Madison Avenue, and watch people walking with bags of money, to dump it on our desk, or Bruce Judson’s desk, to buy banner ads."

The first central ad server was released in July 1995 by Focalink Communications, which enabled the management, targeting, and tracking of online ads. A local ad server quickly followed from NetGravity in January 1996. The technology innovation of the ad server, together with the sale of online ads on an impression basis, fueled a dramatic rise in the proliferation of web advertising and provided the economic foundation for the web industry from the period of 1994 to 2000. The new online advertising model that emerged in the early years of the 21st century, introduced by GoTo.com (later Overture, then Yahoo! and mass marketed by Google's AdWords program), relies heavily on tracking ad response rather than impressions.

== Standard sizes ==
IAB standard ad sizes. This illustration has been reduced in size. See actual sizes.

Ad sizes have been standardized to some extent by the IAB. Prior to the IAB standardization, banner ads appeared in over 250 different sizes. However, some websites and advertising networks (outside the Eurosphere or North America) may not use any or all of the IAB base ad sizes. The IAB ad sizes as of 2007 are:

Standard web banner sizes, entries highlighted in green are part of the IAB's original Universal Ad Package. Entries in red with a dagger suffix (†) were delisted after the update in 2011
Name	Width / px	Height / px	Aspect ratio
Rectangles and Pop-Ups (Note: This group was added around the beginning of 2000.)
Medium Rectangle	300	250	6∶5
Square Pop-Up†	250	250	1∶1
Vertical Rectangle†	240	400	3∶5
Large Rectangle†	336	280	6∶5
Rectangle	180	150	6∶5
3:1 Rectangle† (Note: Added in 2007 update.)	300	100	3∶1
Pop-Under†	720	300	24∶10
Banners and Buttons
Full banner†	468	60	39∶5
Half banner†	234	60	39∶10
Micro button	88	31	88∶31
Button 1†	120	90	4∶3
Button 2	120	60	2∶1
Vertical banner†	120	240	1∶2
Square button†	125	125	1∶1
Leaderboard (Note: Added in 2003 update.)	728	90	364∶45
Skyscrapers
Wide skyscraper	160	600	4∶15
Skyscraper†	120	600	1∶5
Half page ad (Note: Added in 2004 update.)	300	600	1∶2

Notes

In 2015, IAB announced advertising creative guidelines for display & mobile, considering HTML5.

In 2017, IAB also introduced the new guidelines, featuring adjustable ad formats, as well as the guidelines for new digital content experiences such as augmented reality (AR), virtual reality (VR), social media, mobile video, emoji ad messaging, and 360-degree video ads.

Fixed size ad specification
Ad Unit Name		Size (px)			Aspect ratio	Pixels
Billboard		970	×	250	97:25	242,500
Smartphone Banner		300	×	50	6∶1	15,000
Smartphone Banner		320	×	50	32:5	16,000
Leaderboard		728	×	90	364∶45	65,520
Super Leaderboard/Pushdown		970	×	90	97:9	87,300
Portrait	3:	300	×	1050	2:7	315,000
Skyscraper		160	×	600	4:15	96,000
Medium Rectangle		300	×	250	6∶5	75,000
—		120	×	160	3:4	19,200
Mobile Phone Interstitial	S:	640	×	1136	≈9:16	727,040
Mobile Phone Interstitial	M:	750	×	1334	9:16	1,000,500
Mobile Phone Interstitial	L:	1080	×	1920	9:16	2,073,600
Feature Phone Small Banner		120	×	20	6∶1	2,400
Feature Phone Medium Banner		168	×	28	6∶1	4,704
Feature Phone Large Banner		216	×	36	6∶1	7,776

Standard web banners included into the IAB's Universal Package and Ad Units Guidelines are supported by major ad serving companies. This is particularly relevant for IAB members such as Adform, AppNexus, Chitika, Conversant, Epom, HIRO, Mixpo, SpotXchange, ZEDO, and many others. Additionally, ad serving providers may offer other, non-standard banner sizes and technologies, as well as the support of different online advertising formats (e.g. native ads).

However, standard banner ad sizes are constantly evolving due to consumer creative fatigue and banner blindness. Ad companies consistently test performance of ad units to ensure maximum performance for their clients. IAB has updated its guideline bi-annually. Some publishers that are known for their unique, custom executions include BuzzFeed, CraveOnline, Quartz (publication), Thought Catalog, Elite Daily, Vice Media, Inc., Mic (media company), and many others. According to media research firm eMarketer, such types of custom executions through publisher direct buys are on the rise, with Native advertising spending to hit over $4.3 Billion by the end of 2015.

== Other types ==
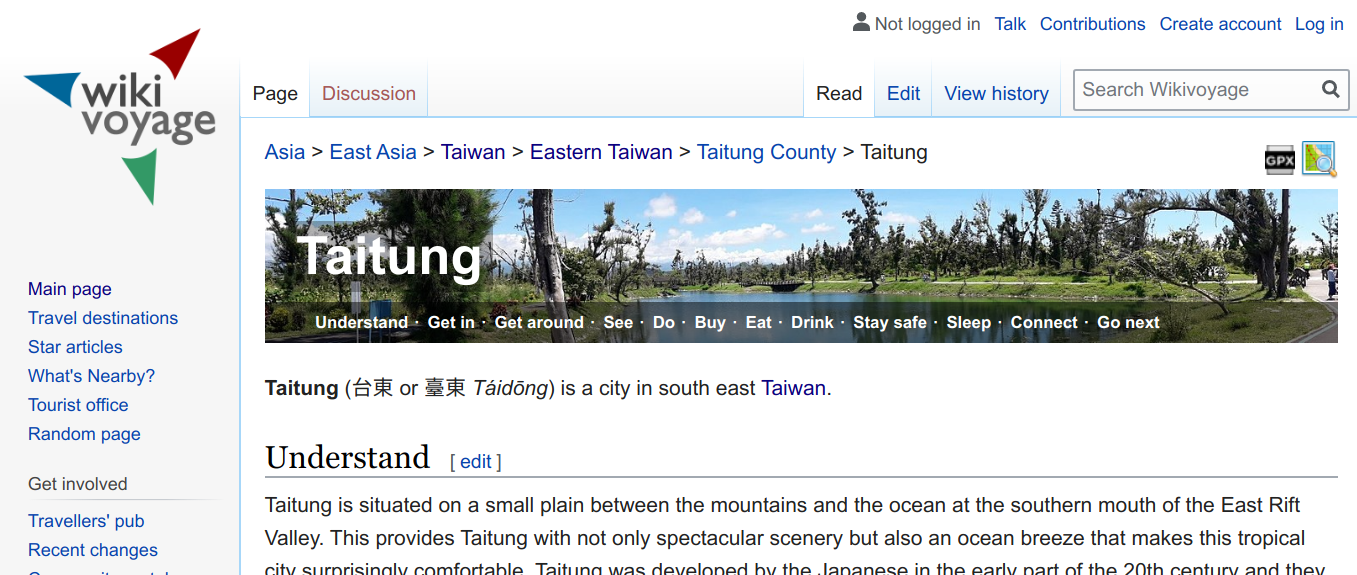
Banner on Wikivoyage

The use of web banners is not restricted to online advertising. Website designs often use non-advertising banners, also known as "hero images" or "hero headers" for aesthetic reasons. Hero images are represented by large photos, graphics, or videos that are placed in the prominent sections of a website.

A "live banner" is a banner ad which is created dynamically at the time of display, instead of being pre-programmed with fixed content. Live banners usually employ animation together with text, images, graphics, sounds and video to catch the viewer's attention. Depending on the banner design, any of these multimedia elements may be defined as dynamic and therefore variable. Formerly, they were built using technologies such as Adobe Flash, Java, or Microsoft Silverlight.

== See also ==
- Advertising network
- Cost per impression
- Digital display advertising
- Hover ad
- Digital marketing
- Pay-per-click
- Pop-up ad
- View-through rate
- Web analytics
- Web badge
