= Bruce Judson =

- Born: New York City
- Occupations: Author, Public Policy Analyst
- Spouse: Nancy Judson
- Children: 2

Bruce Judson (born 1958 in New York City) is an American author, media innovator, and public policy analyst.

== Education ==
Judson attended Dartmouth College and received a bachelor's degree in Policy Studies in 1980. In 1984, he received a Juris Doctor from the Yale Law School and an MBA from the Yale School of Management. At the Yale Law School, he was the co-founder and editor-in-chief of the Yale Journal on Regulation and was a Senior Editor of the Yale Law Journal in 1984.

== Career ==
=== Time warner ===
Judson started his career as a consultant and founding member of the New York office of the Boston Consulting Group. In 1989, the Time Inc. Magazine Company appointed him as its first corporate Director of Marketing. After the merger of Time Inc. and Warner Communications led to the creation of Time Warner Inc., Judson's corporate marketing department served as the focal point for Time Warner's initiative to provide advertisers with advertising programs.

With the creation of Time Inc. New Media, Judson was appointed general manager, where he was one of the co-founders of the Pathfinder (website). Both Walter Isaacson, then President of Time Inc. New Media, and The Columbia Journalism Review credit Judson with inventing the concept of the Web banner ad, which established the standardized system that enabled the rapid growth of Internet advertising.

Judson's activities at Time Inc. New Media are described in Michael Wolff’s book, Burn Rate.

=== Yale & independent businesses ===
Judson left Time Inc. in 1997. He became a Faculty Fellow at the Yale School of Management, and by 2007 was a Senior Faculty Fellow. Yale School of Management announced that he would run a management "clinic," offering free consulting to small businesses. He taught on the Yale Publishing Course and as the first entrepreneur-in-residence at the Yale Entrepreneurial Institute. Judson was also active in developing independent businesses, including Web-Clipping (co-founder), (an early online news clipping service for businesses), the business broadband marketplace Speed Anywhere, and a mobile web site development firm. As of December 2015, Judson was a Senior Adviser to Tern Plc.

=== Britepool, inc. ===
After working starting in telehealth in 2017, Judson returned to the media business in 2019, joining BritePool, Inc. as Vice President of Communications.

== Author ==
In 1996, Judson's first book NetMarketing was published. He was named by Advertising Age as one of the nation's "Cybermarketing Leaders."

In 1999, Scribner published, HyperWars which Judson co-authored. The book asserted that significant changes in corporate strategies would be required for success in the coming Internet era.

In 2004, HarperBusiness published Judson's book, Go it Alone! which argued that the combination of software-as-a-service, automation, and outsourcing, enabled by the Internet would fundamentally alter the nature of entrepreneurship and small business success. In the book, Judson also asserted that as a result of automated leverage created by the Internet, small groups of people or individuals, working on their own, would be able to build high-revenue businesses. The book was recognized by Library Journal as one of the best business books published in the year of its release, while Judson's ideas on the future of entrepreneurship was the subject of interviews in The Wall Street Journal and Entrepreneur magazine. Judson partnered with HarperBusiness to test the value of making the full text of Go It Alone! available free online, with advertising support. This first-of-its-kind effort in book publishing was featured in a U.S. News & World Report cover story. In 2012, Entrepreneur magazine dedicated a feature story to the book, and its continuing popularity writing "In a time when the half-life of business books" is [short]...Go It Alone! has remained popular and relevant."

Judson's book, It Could Happen Here, was published in 2009 by HarperCollins. The book argued that growing and extreme economic inequality in the United States was a societal danger. Judson worked with historical and social science research to construct a model which indicated that highly unequal societies are characterized by political polarization, anger, lack of trust, political paralysis, a collapsing middle class and potentially political instability. The book appeared two years before Occupy Wall Street led economic inequality to be considered a mainstream political issue, and at the time the significance of growing economic inequality was often disregarded or seen as unlikely to continue.

Judson was subsequently appointed a Braintruster at the Roosevelt Institute, where he launched a column titled Restoring Capitalism for the institute's website. Articles from the column were syndicated in online media including The Business Insider and The Huffington Post.

== Publications ==
- NetMarketing: Your Guide to Profit and Success on the Net (Wolff New Media/Random House, 1996) ISBN 0-679-77031-3
- HyperWars: 11 Strategies for Survival and Profit in the Era of Online Business (with Kate Kelly) (Scribner, 1999) ISBN 0-684-85564-X
- Go It Alone! The Secret to Starting a Successful Business on Your Own (HarperBusiness, 2004) ISBN 0-06-073113-3
- It Could Happen Here: America on the Brink (HarperCollins, 2009) ISBN 978-0-06-188591-4
