= Richard Boyce =

Richard Boyce may refer to:

- Richard Boyce (bishop) (1928–2020), bishop in the Anglican Church in North America
- Rick Boyce, early marketeer in the commercialization of the World Wide Web
- Dick Boyce, Canadian political candidate
- Sir Richard Boyce, 2nd Baronet (1929–1968), of the Boyce baronets
- Richard Boyce, professionally known as Dickie Beau

== See also ==
- Boyce (disambiguation)
