= Landslide: The Final Days of the Trump Presidency =

2021 book by Michael Wolff

- Author: Michael Wolff
- Publisher: Henry Holt and Company
- Publication date: July 13, 2021
- ISBN: 978-1-250-83001-2
- Preceded by: Siege: Trump Under Fire
- Followed by: All or Nothing: How Trump Recaptured America

Landslide: The Final Days of the Trump Presidency is a nonfiction book by Michael Wolff. It was published by Henry Holt and Company in 2021. This book is the third in a nonfiction trilogy by Wolff updating information on the presidency of Donald Trump and focuses on the final days and the ending of Trump's presidency. The title come from the typical false claim parroted by Trump himself, that he won ''in a landslide'' in the 2020 election.

The two preceding books of the trilogy are Fire and Fury: Inside the Trump White House and Siege: Trump Under Fire.

== Reception ==
Dwight Garner, reviewing for The New York Times, praised the book as "smart, vivid and intrepid"; he viewed it as "more vivid and apt" than I Alone Can Fix It by Washington Post journalists Carol Leonnig and Philip Rucker, a book covering the same time period and released about the same time. Garner wrote that the "impudent and inquisitive qualities" of Landslide were similar to Joe McGinniss' The Selling of the President 1968 and that Wolff effectively "zeros in on the chaos and the kakistocracy, on how nearly everyone with a sense of decency fled Trump in his final months, and how he was left with clapped-out charlatans like Sidney Powell and Rudy Giuliani."

== See also ==
- List of The New York Times number-one books of 2021
