= Ken McCarthy =

American activist and internet marketer

- Born: Ken McCarthy; September 20, 1959 (age 66); New Haven, Connecticut, US
- Education: Princeton University
- Occupation: Internet marketer
- Employer(s): Amacord, Inc.
- Known for: Promotion of Internet marketing, alternative media
- Website: http://www.kenmccarthy.com

Ken McCarthy (born September 20, 1959) is an American activist, educator, entrepreneur, and Internet commercialization pioneer.

== Contributions to the Internet industry ==
McCarthy is best known for his pioneering work in the movement to commercialize the Internet in the first part of the 1990s, including early experiments with legitimate e-mail advertising, contributions to the development of the banner ad, practical applications of pay-per-click advertising and Internet video. He is credited in Time magazine with originating the idea of using click-through rates as the key metric of website performance.

In 1994, he organized and sponsored the first conference ever held on potential commercial applications of the World Wide Web. Marc Andreessen, co-founder of Netscape and developer of the first commercially successful Web browser, was the keynote speaker. Other Internet pioneers who acknowledge the impact McCarthy's ideas had on their own work include Ed Niehaus, Rick Boyce, and Steve O'Keefe. In a talk at Pacific Bell in 1994, McCarthy described in detail the new content marketing and distribution model the Internet was making possible, a model now sometimes referred to as the long tail.

In 1998, he sold his company E-Media (a term he coined and for which he owned the federal trademark) to an investment group that rolled it up into Nine Systems, which in turn was absorbed by Akamai Technologies. He remains active in the Internet industry as an advisor, investor and entrepreneur operating under the name Amacord, Inc.

He worked as a consultant to NEC's Biglobe, Japan's largest online service, from 1996 to 2001. He wrote the first book on Internet entrepreneurship published in Japan: The Internet Business Manual.

== Activism ==
In 1995, McCarthy organized and sponsored a conference on the topic of using the web as a local publishing medium to assist community building.

Projects that came out of that conference include one of the first detailed studies of an election fraud to appear in any medium (the 1997 49er Stadium bond issue in San Francisco); a virtual museum dedicated to recovering the forgotten story of one of San Francisco's most historically important neighborhoods (the Fillmore); and documentation of the largest and most successful maritime evacuation in history (New York City on September 11, 2001.)

McCarthy has also worked with challenged communities—Hudson, New York, and New Orleans, Louisiana—to develop strategies to use the web to organize citizens and engage in public education and outreach. His work in Hudson resulted in the defeat of a plan to build what would have been North America's largest coal-fired cement plant on the banks of the Hudson River.

Since 2006, McCarthy has worked with Levees.org, the New Orleans-based organization dedicated to ensuring that New Orleans' levees are rebuilt correctly and that levees in other parts of the country with similar engineering flaws are tended to and repaired.

== Internet video publishing ==
In the summer of 1994, McCarthy commissioned Hank Duderstadt, then head of the Video SIG for the San Francisco chapter of the International Interactive Communications Society (IICS), to write a cover story for the Internet Gazette on the potential of streaming video on the Internet.

The Internet Gazette, a short-lived print publication distributed for free in the San Francisco Bay Area, was founded and published by McCarthy to serve as a vehicle for disseminating practical advice to members of the Bay Area digital interactive communications community on how to use the Internet as a publishing and marketing tool.

In 2005, inspired by the launches of YouTube and Google Video, McCarthy began an online publication on Internet video called The System Video Blog. In this publication, McCarthy tracked the development of the Internet video industry and reported on his own experiments in Internet video publishing.

The projects included providing support for Levees.org, the New Orleans-based non-profit and creating an online video encyclopedia about the city of New Orleans, FoodMusicJustice.org; a searchable compilation of clips from television newscasts and independent video makers, BrasscheckTV.com; a search engine for videos of jazz performances, JazzontheTube.com; and an educational site on nutrition and food safety issues, TheRealFoodChannel.com.

== Other activities ==
In addition to his work in the Internet industry, McCarthy has been involved in the music industry, as a concert producer and promoter; in the film industry, as co-founder of one of New York City's first digital film audio post production studios (When We Were Kings, Like Water for Chocolate); and on Wall Street, as a technical communications consultant to Bankers Trust and First Boston.,

In the 1980s, while still in his twenties, he guest lectured at the business schools of Columbia University, MIT and New York University as part of a project called Optimal Learning, which was based on practical applications of his academic studies in psychology and neuroscience at Princeton University.

Over the years, McCarthy has published a large number of articles on a wide variety of subjects, including business, eCommerce, the history of media, economics, the business cycle, financial markets, geopolitics, U.S. politics, political dissidents in China and other countries, medicine and public health, agriculture, and military science. These articles have been a mix of investigative journalism, analysis and prediction. Some of these articles have been posted to brasscheck.com and brasschecktv.com

The content of Brasscheck is the property of the First Amendment Defense Trust. This organization was created after McCarthy's investigation of the San Francisco 49ers stadium bond issue election.

BrasscheckTV features videos on a wide range of contemporary topics, available via e-mail subscription. Ken McCarthy has been an advocate of alternative media. He is quoted in an interview on July 9, 2007, with Wes Unruh, of Alterati.com, describing traditional news reporting as "so incredibly inept", and asserting that "...for that small percentage of people that really wants to know, the Internet's been a blessing and I think it will be very persistent."

Speaking specifically of BrasscheckTV.com, he said, "I'm putting the videos into context and giving people background on the significance of what they're actually seeing..."

In 1999, McCarthy collaborated with filmmaker Rick Goldsmith to create an online archive of the work of American investigative journalist George Seldes (1890–1995) in support of Goldsmith's Academy Award-nominated film Tell the Truth and Run: George Seldes and the American Press.

The name McCarthy gave to his own investigative efforts—"Brasscheck"—came from a book by Upton Sinclair about which George Seldes commented: "In 1920, Upton Sinclair, an outsider to journalism, wrote The Brass Check, the first book exposing the press. It was this book, plus a friendship with the author lasting many years, that influenced me and the books I wrote on the press, beginning in the 1930s."

McCarthy is the founder and publisher of JazzontheTube.com, the high-ranking jazz and blues video compilation website.

== Early life and education ==
Born in New Haven, Connecticut, McCarthy's father Francis W. McCarthy (1922–2003) was a pioneer in the practical applications of data processing technology for the insurance industry.

McCarthy's maternal grandfather, Andrew Paretti of the Bronx, New York, was the pre-eminent granite masonry contractor in the New York City area from 1936 to 1955. His firm did the stonework for the chapel at West Point, Keating Hall at Fordham University, and the Peace Plaza of the United Nations, as well as numerous public works projects during the Robert Moses era.

McCarthy spent his formative years in North Haven, CT, Palos Verdes, CA, San Francisco, CA, the Kingsbridge section of the Bronx, NY, and Upper Montclair, NJ. He graduated from Regis High School in Manhattan in 1977 and Princeton University in 1981. At Princeton he hosted a jazz program for WPRB-FM. While at university and immediately afterwards, he produced numerous concerts, including several for his college roommate, who later became a multi-Grammy nominee Stanley Jordan. His studies at Princeton included neuroscience, cognitive psychology and anthropology.

== See also ==
- Internet marketing
