= James Kinsella (entrepreneur) =

American technology executive and journalist

- Born: October 10, 1959 (age 67); St. Louis, Missouri, U.S.
- Education: Haverford College
- Occupation: Tech entrepreneur
- Notable work: Covering the Plague, 1989

James Kinsella (born October 10, 1959) is an American tech entrepreneur and former journalist who worked on some of the earliest commercial web ventures in the United States and Europe. He served as president of MSNBC.com in the 1990s and as CEO at Interoute Communications, Ltd.

== Early life and education ==
James Kinsella was born in St. Louis, Missouri and graduated from Lindbergh High School in St. Louis County, Missouri and Haverford College.

== Career ==
=== Business and journalism ===
Kinsella worked as a journalist for several U.S. media companies, including the Los Angeles Herald Examiner and Time. While on sabbatical from the Herald Examiner, where he was the editor of the editorial pages, Kinsella was a fellow at Columbia University's Garnett Center for Media Studies. His research of media coverage of the AIDS epidemic, first published by the New England Journal of Public Policy in 1988, formed the basis of his 1989 book Covering the Plague, which tells how the media and medical experts "fumbled" the AIDS story.

Kinsella was a founder of the first major media company's web-based venture, Time's Pathfinder. He later managed Microsoft's joint media venture with NBC, MSNBC, launched in 1996. He served as a vice president at Microsoft and president of the Microsoft-managed part of the venture, MSNBC.com.

In June 2000, Kinsella became chairman and CEO of World Online, the European equivalent of AOL owned by the Sandoz Family Foundation. The company had gone public in the spring of that year but was quickly dogged by the revelation that its founder and chairwoman, Nina Brink, had secretly sold shares at a drastic discount to the flotation price. Kinsella replaced Brink as chairman and CEO and quickly set about cutting costs, including cancelling the private plane Brink had leased as well as stopping a multimillion-euro ad campaign featuring Sarah, Duchess of York. Kinsella eventually merged World Online with its Italian competitor, Tiscali, in a sale valuing World Online at $5.1 billion.

Following the merger, Kinsella became chairman and CEO of the Sandoz Family Foundation's other major investment in European technology, Interoute Communications Ltd. The company was launched in 1996 to develop a pan-European digital infrastructure for the booming web-based sector but suffered from the collapse of the dotcom bubble. In 2002, Kinsella brought Interoute out of bankruptcy. The move was controversial because it resulted in the loss of hundreds of jobs. A subsequent partnership with Greek operator OTE to provide high-speed bandwidth to Greece in the run-up to the Olympics helped the company survive.

After the dot-com bubble and 2008 financial crisis, Interoute acquired a series of heavily discounted European assets, including the failed KPNQwest's Ebone network and one of the world's first business-to-business Internet service providers, PSINet Europe.

In response to the rise of data-privacy concerns and the emerging General Data Protection Regulation (GDPR), Kinsella launched a European-based competitor in the data storage and sharing industry, called Zettabox. The company was described by the European Commission as "an example of a genuinely European cloud storage solution" and a "GDPR by design" alternative. He was widely referenced in the media as a GDPR entrepreneur.

Interoute was sold to GTT in March 2018 for $2.3 billion (€1.9 billion).

=== Non-profit and foundation work ===
Kinsella was a founder in 1996 of the Internet Content Coalition, a not-for-profit association of producers and distributors of original content on the Internet. Its primary role was to help create a responsible and business-friendly environment through advocacy, education, standardization and policy, with the secondary goal of preventing laws that might block the development of the Internet's creative potential.

Two decades later, as a tech executive in the European Union, Kinsella worked to develop privacy tools to combat rampant violation of individual users' data. He also lobbied the European Union on implementation of the GDPR. He subsequently pushed for the adoption of a US version of the GDPR.

The Robert McNeal and James Kinsella Family Fund supports efforts to close the income inequality gap, including scholarship programs and a student emergency fund, as well as support of LGBTQ rights, such as funding the Spectrum Club at the United States Air Force Academy.
