= Zettabox =

Online cloud storage and team-sharing tool

Zettabox was a pan-European online cloud storage and team-sharing tool, created by co-founders James Kinsella and Robert McNeal. The company's operational headquarters was located in Prague, whilst the Sales and Marketing decisions are headed up in London.

At the time when Zettabox was founded, the total amount of worldwide data saved on networks had surpassed 1,000 Exabytes and entered a new era of sizing storage – Zettabytes (1 x 1021).

The company seems to be out of business.

== EU Data Law Regulation ==
With the cloud team sharing and storage market heavily dominated by American-domiciled companies, such as Dropbox and Box.com, Zettabox was launched as the European alternative. The launch coincided with the news of the impending General Data Protection Regulation (part of the Digital Single Market strategy) which requires all companies doing business in Europe, to know where their data is stored and be able to communicate this information to their customers.

More recently, in 2018 and 2019, a series of privacy violations at Facebook and other social media companies has renewed calls for greater scrutiny of how the largest companies use and misuse users' data.

Zettabox has been described as being 'an example of a genuinely European cloud storage solution' in "The EU Data Protection Reform and Big Data Factsheet". The European Commission cited Zettabox as the first major pan-European alternative to the US-based cloud storage products like Google Drive and Dropbox.
