= Yale Journal on Regulation =

- Discipline: Law review
- Language: English
- Edited by: Jonah Hirsch & Ava Johnson

Publication details
- History: 1983–present
- Publisher: Yale Law School (United States)
- Frequency: Biannual

Standard abbreviations
- Bluebook: Yale J. on Reg.
- ISO 4: Yale J. Regul.

Indexing
- ISSN: 0741-9457
- LCCN: 84646898
- OCLC no.: 10212254

Links
- Journal homepage

The Yale Journal on Regulation (JREG) is a biannual student-edited law review covering regulatory and administrative law published at Yale Law School. The journal publishes articles, essays, notes, and commentaries that cover a wide range of topics in regulatory, corporate, administrative, international, and comparative law. According to the 2015 Washington and Lee University law journal rankings, the journal is ranked first in Administrative Law, in Corporations and Associations, in Commercial Law, in Communications Law, Media and Journalism, and in Health, Medicine, Psychology and Psychiatry. The 2007 ExpressO Guide to Top Law Reviews ranked the journal first among business law reviews based on the number of manuscripts received.

== History ==
The journal was established in 1983 by Mark Goldberg and Bruce Judson. It has featured symposia and special issues on environmental law, federalism, and telecommunications. In 2009, it was a sponsor of the Weil, Gotshal & Manges Roundtable on the "Future of Financial Regulation," where legal academics and panelists evaluated the causes of the subprime mortgage crisis and proposed solutions.

In 2008, the journal launched the Walton H. Hamilton Prize (in honor of the former Yale Law professor, New Deal economic advisor, and antitrust division official Walton Hale Hamilton), awarded to the most outstanding accepted manuscript on the study and understanding of regulatory policy.

== Notable alumni ==
- Alok Ahuja – Judge, Missouri Court of Appeals
- Alena Allen – Dean of Louisiana State University School of Law
- Boris Bershteyn – Acting Administrator of the Office of Information and Regulatory Affairs
- Sergio Campos – Professor of Law at Boston College Law School
- Daniel C. Esty – Commissioner of the Connecticut Department of Energy and Environmental Protection and professor at Yale Law School
- Elizabeth Esty – U.S. Representative for Connecticut's 5th congressional district
- Dabney Friedrich – United States district judge for the District of Columbia
- Jack Goldsmith – Henry L. Shattuck Professor of Law at Harvard Law School; Co-Founder of Lawfare
- Diane Gujarati – United States district judge of the United States District Court for the Eastern District of New York
- Daniel Hemel – John S.R. Shad Professor of Law at NYU Law School
- Robert Hockett – Professor of Law at Cornell University Law School
- David Huebner – United States Ambassador to New Zealand and Samoa
- Bruce Judson – author and media innovator
- Robin Kelsey – Professor of Photography and Dean of Arts and Humanities at Harvard University
- Lina Khan – Chairperson of the Federal Trade Commission
- Jeff Lee – CEO and co-founder of DIBS Beauty
- Claire Priest – Simeon E. Baldwin Professor of Law at Yale Law School
- Alex Raskolnikov – Wilbur H. Friedman Professor of Tax Law at Columbia University Law School
- Gabriel Rauterberg – Professor of Law at University of Michigan Law School
- Adriana Robertson – Donald N. Pritzker Professor of Business Law at the University of Chicago Law School
- Gene Schaerr – Associate Counsel to President George Bush
- Richard J. Sullivan – United States circuit judge for the United States Court of Appeals for the Second Circuit
- Bryan Townsend – Delaware State Senator
- Kevin K. Washburn – Dean of University of Iowa College of Law; Former Assistant Secretary, Bureau of Indian Affairs
