= Fire and Fury =

2018 book by Michael Wolff

Fire and Fury: Inside the Trump White House
- First edition cover
- Author: Michael Wolff
- Language: English
- Subject: Presidency of Donald Trump
- Published: January 5, 2018
- Publisher: Henry Holt and Company
- Publication place: United States
- Media type: Print, e-book, audiobook
- Pages: 336
- ISBN: 978-1-250-15806-2 (Hardcover)
- Followed by: Siege: Trump Under Fire

Fire and Fury: Inside the Trump White House is a 2018 book by journalist Michael Wolff which according to Wolff, details the behavior of U.S. President Donald Trump, the staff of his 2016 presidential campaign, and the White House staff. The title refers to a quote by Trump about the conflict with North Korea. The book became a New York Times number one bestseller. Reviewers generally accepted Wolff's portrait of a dysfunctional Trump administration, but were skeptical of many of Wolff's particular claims.

The book highlights descriptions of Trump's behavior, chaotic interactions among senior White House staff, and derogatory comments about the Trump family by former White House Chief Strategist Steve Bannon. Trump is depicted as being held in low regard by his White House staff, leading Wolff to claim that "100% of the people around him" believe Trump is unfit for office.

== Background ==
According to Michael Wolff, when he approached Donald Trump about writing a book on his presidency, Trump agreed to give him access to the White House because he liked an article Wolff wrote about him in June 2016 for The Hollywood Reporter. However, Trump later claimed that he had never authorized access for Wolff and never spoke to him for the book.

External videos
- Wolff arrival at Trump Tower, Manhattan, November 15, 2016, C-SPAN
- Wolff arrival at Trump Tower, Manhattan, January 12, 2017, C-SPAN

Starting in mid-2016, Wolff interviewed campaign and transition staff. After Trump's inauguration and continuing through most of the first year of his presidency, Wolff was allowed access to the West Wing of the White House, conducting research for his book through interviews and as a "fly on the wall" observer. He said he conducted over 200 interviews with Trump and his associates including the senior staff and was allowed to witness events at the White House without his presence being managed. This allowed Wolff to be present the day of the dismissal of James Comey. Wolff reportedly audiotaped some of the conversations mentioned in the book. The working title for Wolff's book was The Great Transition: The First 100 Days of the Trump Administration, leading many in the White House to believe the book he was writing would be sympathetic to the Trump administration.

== Content ==
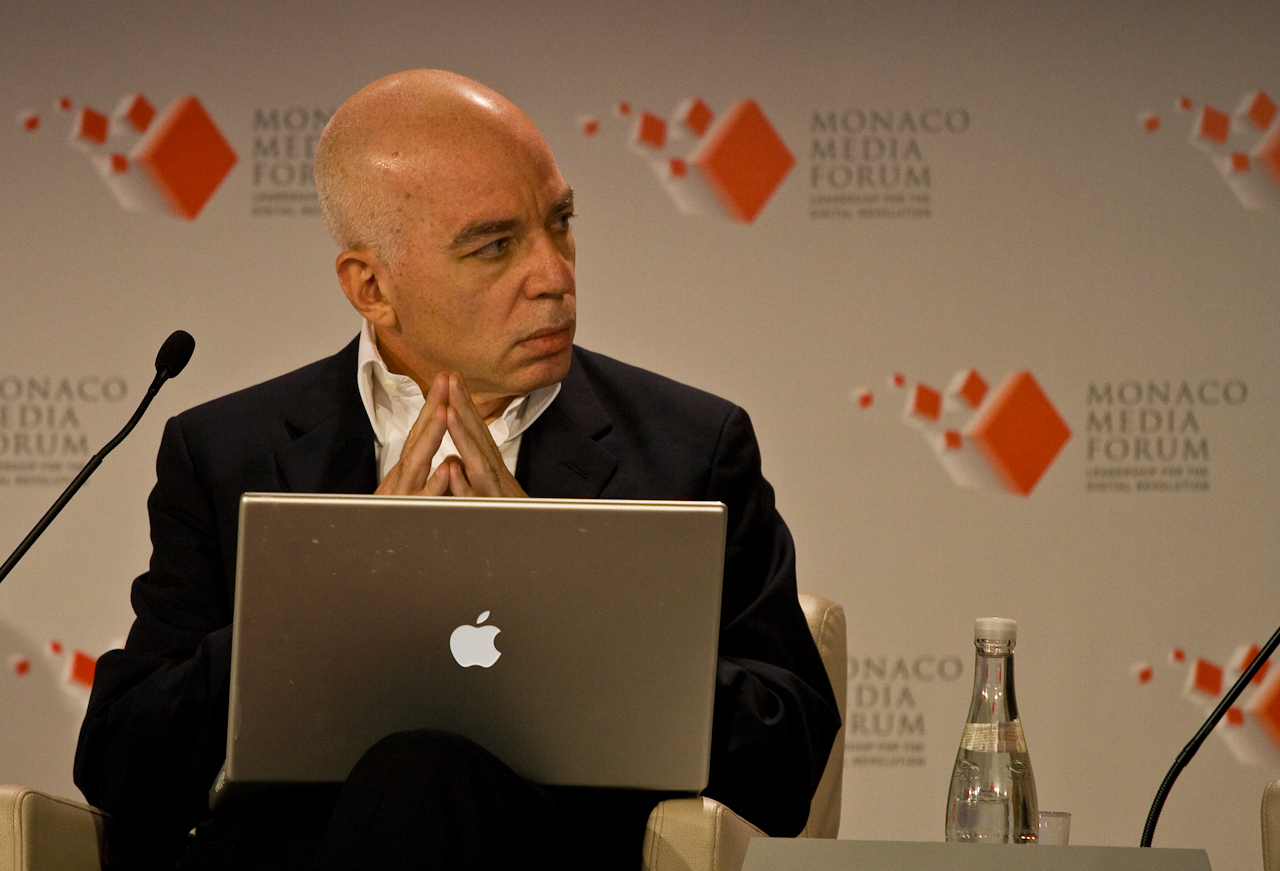
Michael Wolff (pictured) said he conducted more than 200 interviews with Donald Trump and White House staff during his writing of the book.

Wolff chose the title after hearing Trump refer to "fire and fury" when discussing the conflict with North Korea. According to the book, nobody in the presidential campaign team expected to win the 2016 presidential election, including Donald Trump (who reportedly did not want to win) and his wife. Donald Trump Jr. said his father "looked as if he had seen a ghost" on the night of the election, and Melania Trump was "in tears—and not of joy."

Many of the most controversial quotes in the book came from Steve Bannon, the chief executive of the Trump campaign in its final months and White House Chief Strategist from January to August 2017. Bannon referred to the meeting during the presidential campaign of Donald Trump Jr. and Jared Kushner with Russian officials as "treasonous" and "unpatriotic," described Ivanka Trump as "dumb as a brick", and—referencing the now-completed Special Counsel investigation being led by Robert Mueller—said, "they're going to crack Don Junior like an egg on national TV." Bannon also said that Mueller's investigation would likely uncover money laundering involving Kushner from loans received by his family business from Deutsche Bank. Another quote from Bannon was that lawyer Marc Kasowitz had gotten Trump "out of all kinds of jams [...] on the campaign—what did we have, a hundred women? Kasowitz took care of all of them."

Wolff said Trump himself was characterized by "wide-ranging ignorance." For example, Sam Nunberg, a campaign advisor, reportedly tried to explain the United States Constitution to Trump but could not get past the Fourth Amendment. Wolff also claims that Kushner and Ivanka Trump discussed having Ivanka run in a future presidential campaign.

== Release ==
The book was originally scheduled to go on sale on January 9, 2018, but the publisher, Henry Holt and Company, moved up the release date to January 5 due to "unprecedented demand." An excerpt of the book was released by New York magazine on January 3, 2018. The same day, other media outlets reported on further content of the book; for example, The Guardian reported "explosive" highlights, stating they were based on the full book. That day, preorders of the book made it the number 1 bestseller in the country. Fire and Fury debuted at number one on The New York Times Best Seller list, and within a week had become the fastest selling book in the publisher's history, with over 700,000 orders shipped and 1.4 million orders placed.

== Reception ==
=== White House reaction and fallout ===
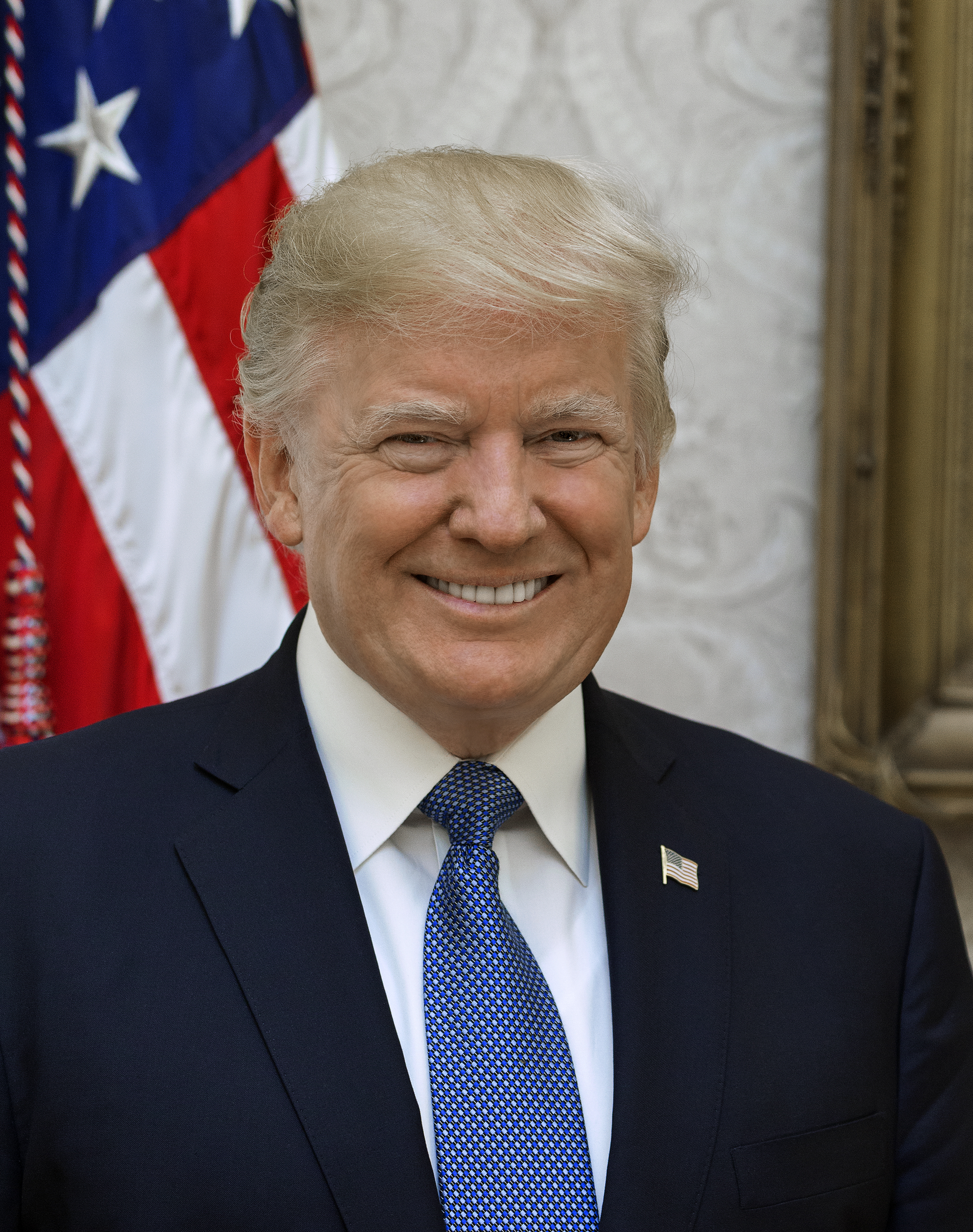
Trump denied many of the assertions made in the book, calling it "a complete work of fiction."

At her daily press briefing on 3 January 2018, Sarah Huckabee Sanders, the White House Press Secretary, called the book "trashy tabloid fiction" and "filled with false and misleading accounts." The White House released a statement saying that Bannon had "lost his mind" and Charles Harder, a lawyer for Trump, sent a cease-and-desist letter to Bannon, allegedly for violating a non-disclosure agreement. On January 4, Harder sought to stop the release of the book, sending a cease-and-desist letter to the author and publisher with the threat of a lawsuit for libel.

His lawyers also said that the book "appears to cite no sources for many of its most damaging statements about Mr. Trump." Henry Holt's attorney, Elizabeth McNamara, later responded to Harder's allegations with an assurance that no apology or retraction would be forthcoming. McNamara also noted that Harder's complaint cited no specific errors in Wolff's text. Some legal experts and historians said that Trump's threats of imminent legal action against the author and publisher were unprecedented for a sitting president attempting to silence criticism.

On January 5, the day of the book's publication, Trump tweeted:

Donald J. Trump
(@realDonaldTrump)
tweeted:

I authorized Zero access to White House (actually turned him down many times) for author of phony book! I never spoke to him for book. Full of lies, misrepresentations and sources that don't exist. Look at this guy's past and watch what happens to him and Sloppy Steve [Bannon]!

January 5, 2018

In response, Wolff stated in an interview later that day:

One of the things we have to count on is that Donald Trump will attack. [...] My credibility is being questioned by a man who has less credibility than perhaps anyone who has ever walked on Earth at this point.

According to Wolff, Trump himself encouraged him to write a "fly-on-the-wall account of Trump's first hundred days." Wolff has also stated that he has "dozens of hours" of taped interviews which back up the claims made in the book.

On January 6, Trump continued to attack the book, calling it "a complete work of fiction" and "a disgrace", and labeling Wolff a "fraud." That same day, in a move interpreted as a response to the book's raising questions about Trump's competence for office, Trump tweeted that his "two greatest assets have been mental stability and being, like, really smart." From his successes in business, television, and politics, Trump concluded that he was in fact "a very stable genius."

On January 7, Bannon issued a statement calling Trump's son Donald Trump Jr. a "patriot and a good man," saying that his comments were directed at Paul Manafort, not Trump Jr. The next day, on MSNBC's Morning Joe, Wolff denied that Bannon had been talking about Manafort.

Also on January 7, White House senior policy adviser Stephen Miller, speaking on CNN's State of the Union, said: "The book is best understood as a work of very poorly written fiction, and I also will say that the author is a garbage author of a garbage book." In a January 8 interview with Dana Loesch, Vice President Mike Pence described Fire and Fury as a "book of fiction." He stated that he had not read it, and would not read it, but that reports concerning its contents did not accord with his experience of working with Trump. Over the weekend of January 6–7, Rebekah Mercer, a conservative donor who worked with Bannon on Trump's 2016 campaign and as a part-owner of Breitbart News, distanced herself from Bannon, saying she would no longer provide him with financial backing. On January 9, Bannon announced that he would leave Breitbart News.

On January 8, the lawyer representing Wolff and his publisher issued a legal letter defying the cease and desist order and defamation claim, stating that "my clients do not intend to cease publication, no such retraction will occur, and no apology is warranted."

=== Reviews ===
External videos
- Discussion with Wolff on Fire and Fury, January 18, 2018, C-SPAN

Reviewing the book for CNN, Trump biographer Michael D'Antonio attested that Wolff's overall portrait of Trump accorded with his own understanding and that of others, specifically drawing attention to details concerning Trump's short attention span, issues of misogyny and White supremacy, as well as Trump's opinion that "'expertise' is 'overrated.'" He added that Wolff's descriptions of the people around Trump present "a credible picture." D'Antonio criticized Wolff's "tabloidy prose" and reminded the reader to treat the book with a degree of skepticism, but concluded that it was "essential reading" that will provide a framework on which future writers may build. D'Antonio also stated: "Some of what Wolff presents is so speculative that his critics, and the President's most ardent defenders, will be able to pick his work apart. These excesses will diminish the book's impact and, ultimately, do a disservice to the historical record."

Speaking on the PBS NewsHour, David Brooks said that, because Wolff had been known not to check facts, he was "very dubious about accepting everything" in the book. "Nonetheless, the general picture confirms what we already knew. And I think there is a general sense the president is unfit. They treat—they do treat him like a child." Mark Shields agreed and expressed deep concerns that other than Katie Walsh, who briefly worked as deputy chief of staff to Reince Priebus, there did not appear to be any "counteroffensive" in the White House, which Shields described as "the political equivalent of the dog not barking in the night," i.e., conspicuously absent.

Jake Tapper of CNN said that Fire and Fury "should be met with skepticism" as it was "riddled with errors and rumors", while Isaac Chotiner in Slate wrote that "Wolff is not merely out of his depth—he frequently seems confused by even basic matters of political ideology."

Reviewing for The Guardian, Matthew d'Ancona, a former commissioner and editor of Wolff's work, stated that the fact that Wolff was admitted to the White House at all indicated significant incompetence within the Trump administration. D'Ancona described Wolff's version of President Trump and his daughter Ivanka as "the world's stupidest King Lear" and a "clueless Cordelia." Warning the reader against distraction by those searching for "minor errors," d'Ancona described Wolff as a "brilliant journalist," who has a "terrier-like pursuit of the truth." He concluded that Wolff had "nailed it," and had "scotched once and for all the nonsensical claim that we should take Trump seriously but not literally."

For The Tyee, Crawford Kilian said the book was "neither fact nor fiction", disputing its characterizations by Miller and Trump as the latter, as it unearthed little to distinguish its picture of Trump from those in many other media reports on him since he initiated his 2016 presidential campaign. Kilian argued that Wolff's book was substantively much like rhetoric he ascribed to Trump, being composed of "mere assertions, rarely attributed to specific individuals", who themselves were "highly unreliable". He predicted that the Mueller special counsel investigation then in progress would be the most likely source for the true inside story of Trump's campaign "and likely far, far more shocking" than Fire and Fury.

Nathan J. Robinson of Current Affairs called it "virtually worthless" as both a critique of Trump and a factual record of his first year in office, as it relied on confirmation bias for much of its impact on its intended audience while the new information it added, such as Trump's expectation that he would lose the 2016 election, was implausible. Robinson also expressed a lack of confidence in Wolff's trustworthiness based on his refusal to share his recordings of interviews to corroborate his claims.

In a Wall Street Journal review, Barton Swaim sees the book as an unverifiable "gossipy" collection of "every unseemly tidbit he could extract from murmuring White House staffers" written as though he "were the omniscient narrator of a novel." Swaim asserts that the reaction to the book, rather than the book itself, will give reason for it to be historically notable. Axios reporters Jim VandeHei and Mike Allen wrote that parts of the book were "wrong, sloppy, or betray[ed] off-the-record confidence. But there are two things he gets absolutely right." They wrote that Wolff's depiction "of Trump as an emotionally erratic president" was accurate as well as his writing of some White House officials having a "low opinion" of Trump. Andrew Prokop wrote in Vox that "we should interpret the book as a compendium of gossip Wolff heard. A fair amount of it does clearly seem to be accurate." Aaron Blake of The Washington Post wrote that "Wolff seems to have arrived at a stunning amount of incredible conclusions that hundreds of dogged reporters from major newspapers haven't. [...] [I]t's worth evaluating each claim individually and not just taking every scandalous thing said about the White House as gospel."

A review by Mick Brown in The Telegraph described the book as "overheated, sensationalist—and completely true to its subject." David Sexton of the London Evening Standard said the book is a political exposé worth reading and is "destined to become the primary account of the first nine months of the Trump presidency."

=== Nikki Haley controversy ===
While being interviewed during Fire and Fury's publicity tour, Wolff told Bill Maher that he was "absolutely sure" President Trump was having an affair, and said that a close reading of his book could reveal who his partner was. Based on a passage from Fire and Fury, some observers believed this was a reference to Nikki Haley, the United States Ambassador to the United Nations. Haley denied Wolff's allegations, calling it "disgusting" and "absolutely not true". Erik Wemple of The Washington Post said that Wolff was engaging in a "remarkable multimedia slime job". The New York Post editorial board called Wolff's claim an "ugly, sexist rumor". Bari Weiss in The New York Times said that Wolff was "gleefully" spreading "evidence-free detail". After several interviewers pressed him about the rumor, Wolff later said that "I do not know if the president is having an affair."

== Television adaptation ==
Endeavor Content, in association with Chernin Entertainment, purchased the film and television rights the same month of the book's publication. Author Michael Wolff is attached to the series as an executive producer, along with former BBC and Channel 4 executive Michael Jackson and The Young Pope alum John Lyons. In March 2018, Emmy-winning director Jay Roach signed on to direct and executive produce the series. As of March 2018, the project has yet to find a network.

== Sequel ==
In June 2018, Wolff announced that he had signed a deal with Henry Holt, the book's publisher, to write a sequel. The sequel, titled Siege: Trump Under Fire, was released on June 4, 2019.

== See also ==
- The New York Times Non-Fiction Best Sellers of 2018
