= All or Nothing: How Trump Recaptured America =

2025 non-fiction book by Michael Wolff

- First edition cover
- Author: Michael Wolff
- Language: English
- Subject: lead up to the second presidency of Donald Trump
- Published: February 25, 2025
- Publisher: Crown Publishing Group
- Publication place: United States
- Media type: Print, e-book, audiobook
- Pages: 400
- ISBN: 978-0593735381 (Hardcover)
- Preceded by: Landslide: The Final Days of the Trump Presidency

All or Nothing: How Trump Recaptured America is a book by Michael Wolff. It was published by Crown Publishing Group in 2025. This book is the fourth in a series by Wolff updating information on the then-upcoming second presidency of Donald Trump and focuses on the lead up to him winning the 2024 United States presidential election.

== Reception ==
The review by Nicolas Niarchos for The New York Times called the book "undeniably gripping", describing it as a "veritable harvest of slime, sycophancy and sleaze", painting Trump 2.0 as an aggrieved pugilist in a life-or-death campaign. Writing for The Guardian, Lloyd Green believed the author is simultaneously mesmerized and disdainful and found the book deeply personal—illuminating marital strife, inner-circle tensions, and personal animosities. Kirkus Reviews said the book was a "mordant, murkily sourced account of the 2024 election".
