= Mixpo =

American software company

- Founded: 2007
- Headquarters: Seattle, Washington
- Key people: Charlie Tillinghast
- Industry: Video advertising
- Website: http://www.mixpo.com

Mixpo is an advertising software company, which provides software that allows companies and agencies to execute multi-screen video advertisement campaigns. The company’s services include software that allows clients to create online video ads and VideoVerify, a tool meant to identify fraudulent web publishers who inflate online ad numbers through the use of bots.

Mixpo launched in 2007 and is headquartered in Seattle, Washington. The company was one of America’s most promising in 2013 according to Forbes. Mixpo was acquired by Netsertive in August 2017.

== History ==
Mixpo began as PiXPO, a Victoria, British Columbia-based company that helped consumers set up online video broadcast sites. PiXPO was funded by $6.5 million in venture capital provided by Madrona Venture Group, Yaletown Venture Partners, Growthworks Capital Ltd and others.

Mixpo president and CEO Anupam Gupta joined the company in 2006. Prior to joining Mixpo, Gupta worked as an executive at Microsoft. Mixpo launched in January 2007 with products designed to make it easier for small businesses to post multimedia online. By 2008, Mixpo expanded to include analytic and video editing tools, which broadened its user base to include ad agencies, publishers and larger businesses.

In 2011, Mixpo introduced SmartVideo, a tool that allows users to create videos in both Adobe Flash and HTML5. The tool also identifies the type of device an end user is using, which ensures that end-users only receive Flash video on devices that support Flash.

Mixpo contributed to Video Player Ad-Serving Interface Definition (VPAID) 2.0, a video format that seeks to standardize online video and provide a common interface between video players and ad units. VPAID 2.0 was developed under the auspices of the Interactive Advertising Bureau. In 2013, Mixpo collaborated with Discovery Communications to launch the first VPAID 2.0-enabled video ad campaign.

Mixpo released a suite of tools that allow syndication across social media platforms in 2013. The service allows users to push ads and content across social media.

Charlie Tillinghast joined Mixpo as president and CEO in 2014. Prior to joining Mixpo, Tillinghast was president and CEO of MSNBC, a joint venture between Microsoft and NBC News, where he led the company for over a decade until it was acquired by NBC News in 2012. Tillinghast served on Mixpo's board of directors for one year prior to becoming the company's CEO.

Mixpo was acquired by Netsertive in August 2017.

== See also ==
- Eyejot
- Video advertising
