= Siege: Trump Under Fire =

2019 non-fiction book by Michael Wolff

- First edition cover
- Author: Michael Wolff
- Language: English
- Subject: Presidency of Donald Trump
- Published: June 4, 2019
- Publisher: Henry Holt and Company
- Publication place: United States
- Media type: Print, e-book, audiobook
- Pages: 352
- ISBN: 978-1250253828 (Hardcover)
- Preceded by: Fire and Fury: Inside the Trump White House
- Followed by: Landslide: The Final Days of the Trump Presidency

Siege: Trump Under Fire is a book by Michael Wolff and which according to Wolff, details the behavior of U.S. President Donald Trump and his administration. The book is a sequel to Fire and Fury: Inside the Trump White House, a New York Times number one bestseller.

== Publication ==
In June 2018, Wolff announced that he had signed a deal with Henry Holt and Company, the publisher of Fire and Fury, to write a sequel. The book was released on June 4, 2019.

== Summary ==
Wolff's narrative begins in February 2018, and ends with the release of the Mueller Report in March 2019. Wolff uses on-the-record comments by Steve Bannon, a former aide to Trump. He claims to have 150 sources for the book. According to Wolff, "Robert Mueller drew up a three-count obstruction of justice indictment against Donald Trump before deciding to shelve it." A week prior to the release of Siege, a spokesperson for Mueller denied that such a document exists.

== Reception ==
Harvard law professor Alan Dershowitz, who was mentioned in the book, criticized Wolff and his publisher's alleged failure to confirm the story, adding that "it is fiction and bad fiction at that."

In an interview, Michael Isikoff questioned Wolff over various factual errors and inconsistencies in the book, such as his claim of an obstruction of justice indictment by Mueller. Wolff did not acknowledge these concerns as significant and argued that the purpose of the book was to offer readers "a sense of what this experience [of Trump world] is."
