= Burn Rate =

1998 book by Michael Wolff

- Author: Michael Wolff
- Language: English
- Genre: Non-fiction
- Publisher: Simon & Schuster
- Publication date: June 24th, 1998
- Publication place: United States
- Media type: Print (hardcover and paperback)
- Pages: 288
- ISBN: 0-684-85621-2
- OCLC: 41672640

Burn Rate: How I Survived the Gold Rush Years on the Internet is a 1998 non-fiction book by Michael Wolff, an account of Wolff's dotcom company, Wolff New Media.

== Content ==
The "burn rate" of the title refers to the cash drain of the startup company. Most of the plot revolves around Wolff's attempts to get funding from various sources: AOL, The Washington Post and Magellan. Wolff recounts a growing animosity with his financial backers: Robert Machinist, Alan Patricof and Jon Rubin. In the end, Wolff decides to abandon the company, resigning his position, cashing his uncollected salary, and returning to his roots as a journalist, by writing a tell-all book.

In side-light chapters to the "burn rate" plot, Wolff discusses his interactions with Internet pioneers such as Louis Rossetto, his confusion about what the Internet is, and where it is headed. In particular, Wolff is concerned with how "media" on the Internet compares to traditional edited media, with interactive "chat" being more important than edited story-line content: "people don't read on the Internet".

== Publication history ==
Burn Rate was excerpted in the June 1998 issue of Wired. The book was released that fall, and has now had four editions and hardback and paperback versions.

== Reactions ==
In October 1998, Wolff wrote that Isabel Maxwell and David Hayden of Magellan complained about their portrayals. He also noted "letters from lawyers" from Jon Rubin and Alan Patricof. From Robert Machinist, whom he labels as the "larger than life anti-hero" of the book, there was satisfaction at Burn Rate's notoriety generating more business.

The Village Voice noted that Wolff had omitted to tell a part of the story of Wolff New Media's implosion: that, while Wolff was deferring his own salary to keep the company afloat, he encouraged his employees to do the same. When Wolff collected his owed salary, he exhausted the company's remaining cash reserves, resulting in the rest of his employees' inability to receive any salary back-pay.

== Reviews ==
- Business Week
- CNN
- Complete Review, The
- New York Times, The (Hafnert)
- New York Times, The (Lehmann-Haupt)
- New York Times, The (Stead)
- "salon 21st". Salon. Archived from the original on June 12, 2008.
- San Francisco Chronicle, The
- Slate
- strategy+business
- Suck
- Writers Write (July 1998)

== Related Interviews ==
- Austin Chronicle, The
- Writers Write (August 1998)
