= Michael Wolff (journalist) =

American writer (born 1953)

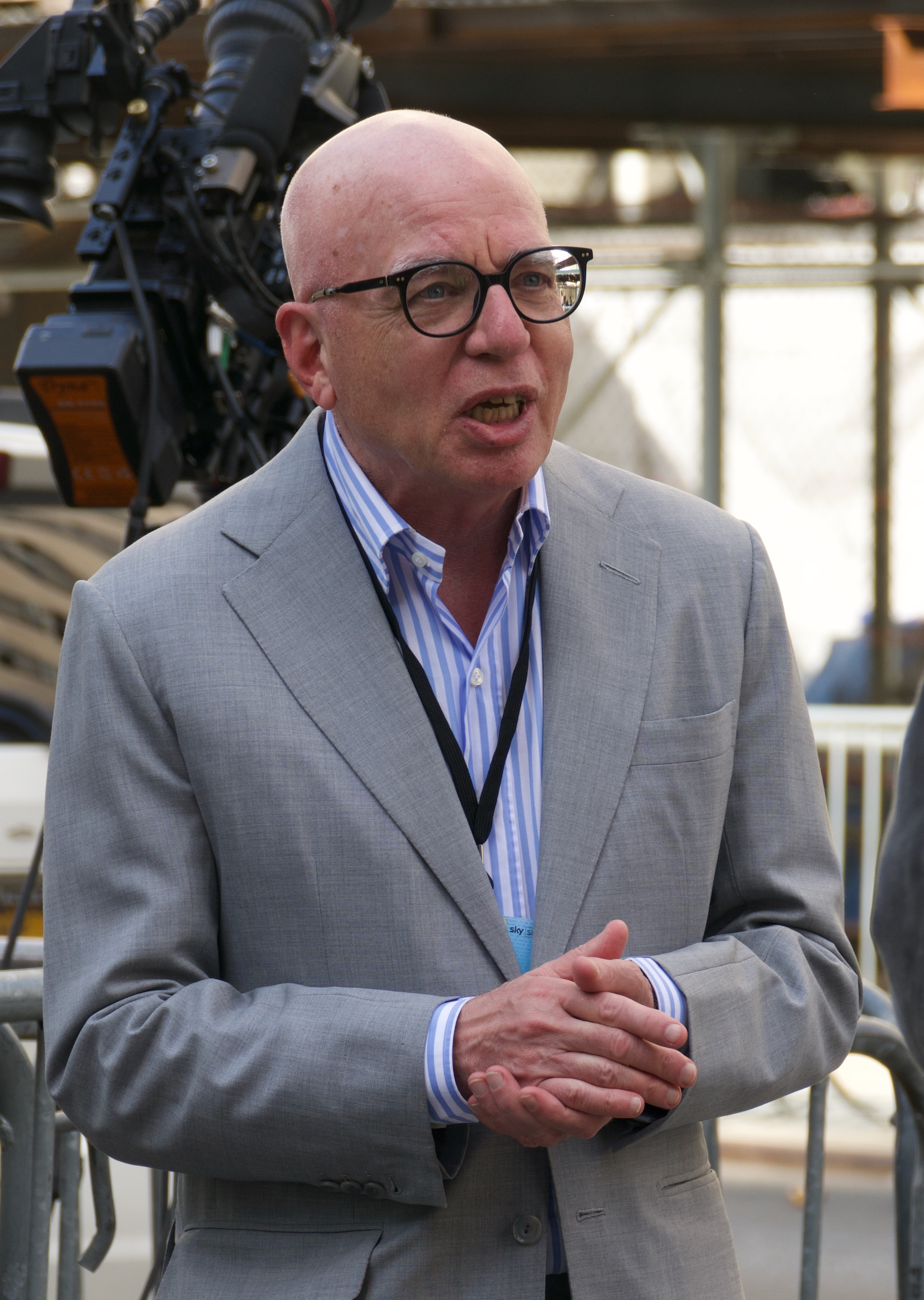
- Wolff in 2024
- Born: August 27, 1953 (age 73); Paterson, New Jersey, U.S.
- Education: Columbia University (BA)
- Occupations: Journalist; media consultant
- Spouses: Alison Anthoine (divorced): Victoria Floethe
- Children: 5
- Writing career
- Notable works: Burn Rate (1998); Fire and Fury (2018)
- Notable awards: National Magazine Award; Mirror Award

Michael Wolff (born August 27, 1953) is an American journalist and media consultant, as well as a columnist and contributor to USA Today and The Hollywood Reporter. He has received two National Magazine Awards, a Mirror Award, and has authored seven books, including Burn Rate (1998) about his own dot-com company, and The Man Who Owns the News (2008), a biography of Rupert Murdoch. He co-founded the news aggregation website Newser and is a former editor of Adweek.

On January 5, 2018, Wolff's book Fire and Fury: Inside the Trump White House was published, containing descriptions of behavior by U.S. President Donald Trump, chaotic interactions among the White House senior staff, and derogatory comments about the Trump family by former White House Chief Strategist Steve Bannon. The book quickly became a New York Times number-one bestseller and was the first of four books about Trump in power, the others being Siege: Trump Under Fire (2019), Landslide: The Final Days of the Trump Presidency (2021) and All or Nothing: How Trump Recaptured America (2025).

Wolff stated on his podcast that he recorded an estimated 100 hours of interviews with Jeffrey Epstein over several years, specifically regarding Epstein's relationship with and assessment of Donald Trump.

== Early life and education ==
Michael Wolff was born on August 27, 1953, in Paterson, New Jersey, the son of Lewis Allen Wolff (1920–1984), a Jewish advertising professional, and Marguerite (Vanderwerf) "Van" Wolff (1925–2012) a reporter for Paterson Evening News. Wolff graduated from Montclair Academy (now Montclair Kimberley Academy) in 1971, where he was student council president in his senior year. He attended Vassar College and transferred to Columbia University, from which he graduated in 1975. While a student at Columbia, he worked for The New York Times as a copy boy.

== Career ==
=== 1970s ===
He published his first magazine article in the New York Times Magazine in 1974: a profile of Angela Atwood, a neighbor of his family who helped kidnap Patricia Hearst as a member of the Symbionese Liberation Army. Shortly afterward, he left the Times and became a contributing writer to the New Times, a biweekly news magazine started by Jon Larsen and George Hirsch. Wolff's first book was White Kids (1979), a collection of essays.

=== 1990s ===
In 1991, Wolff launched Michael Wolff & Company, Inc., specializing in book-packaging. Its first project, Where We Stand, was a book with a companion PBS series. The company's next major project was creating one of the first guides to the Internet, albeit in book form. Net Guide was published by Random House.

In the fall of 1998, Wolff published a book, Burn Rate, which recounted the details of the financing, positioning, personalities, and ultimate breakdown of Wolff's start-up Internet company, Wolff New Media. The book became a bestseller. In its review of Wolff's book Burn Rate, Brill's Content criticized Wolff for "apparent factual errors" and said that 13 people, including subjects he mentioned, complained that Wolff had "invented or changed quotes".

In August 1998, Wolff was recruited by New York magazine to write a weekly column. Over the next six years, he wrote more than 300 columns that included criticism of the entrepreneur Steven Brill, the media banker Steven Rattner, and the book publisher Judith Regan.

=== 2000s ===
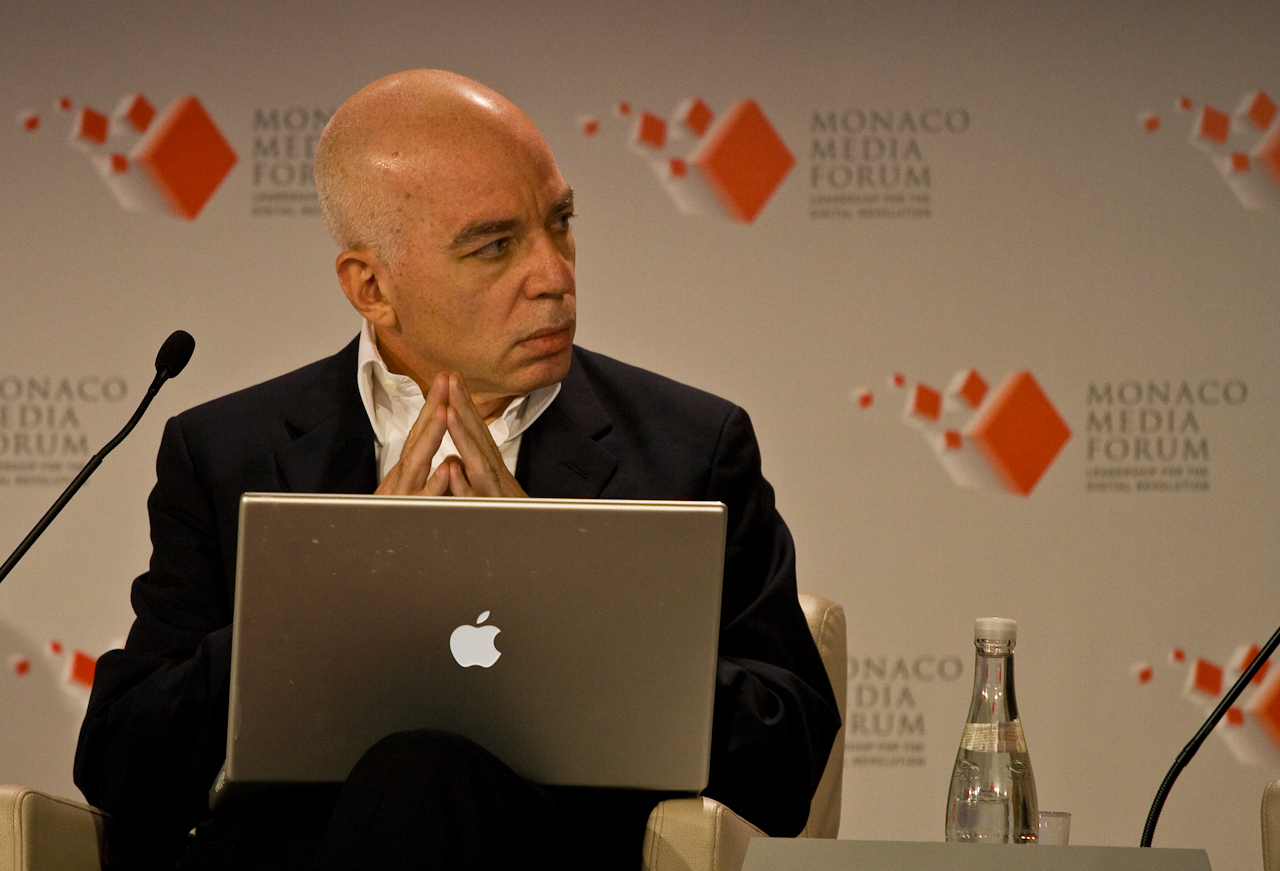
Wolff at the 2008 Monaco Media Forum

Wolff was nominated for the National Magazine Award three times, winning twice. His second National Magazine Award was for a series of columns he wrote from the media center in the Persian Gulf as the Iraq War started in 2003. His book, Autumn of the Moguls (2004), which predicted the mainstream media crisis that hit later in the decade, was based on many of his New York magazine columns.

In 2004, when the owner of New York magazine, Primedia (now Rent Group), put the magazine up for sale, Wolff helped assemble a group of investors, including New York Daily News publisher Mortimer Zuckerman, Hollywood producer Harvey Weinstein, and financier Jeffrey Epstein to back him in acquiring the magazine. Although the group believed it had made a successful bid, Primedia decided to sell the magazine to the investment banker Bruce Wasserstein.

In a 2004 cover story for The New Republic, Michelle Cottle wrote that Wolff was "uninterested in the working press," preferring to focus on "the power players—the moguls" and was "fixated on culture, style, buzz, and money, money, money." She also noted that "the scenes in his columns aren’t recreated so much as created—springing from Wolff’s imagination rather than from actual knowledge of events," calling his writing "a whirlwind of flourishes and tangents and asides that often stray so far from the central point that you begin to wonder whether there is a central point."

In 2005, Wolff joined Vanity Fair as its media columnist. In 2007, with Patrick Spain, the founder of Hoover's, and Caroline Miller, the former editor-in-chief of New York magazine, he launched Newser, a news aggregator website.

That year, he also wrote a biography of Rupert Murdoch, The Man Who Owns the News, based on more than 50 hours of conversation with Murdoch and extensive access to his business associates and his family. The book was published in 2008. Beginning in mid-2008, Wolff briefly worked as a weekly columnist for The Industry Standard, an Internet trade magazine published by IDG. David Carr, in a review Business Insider's Maxwell Tani described as "scathing" wrote that Wolff was "far less circumspect" than most other journalists.

=== 2010s ===
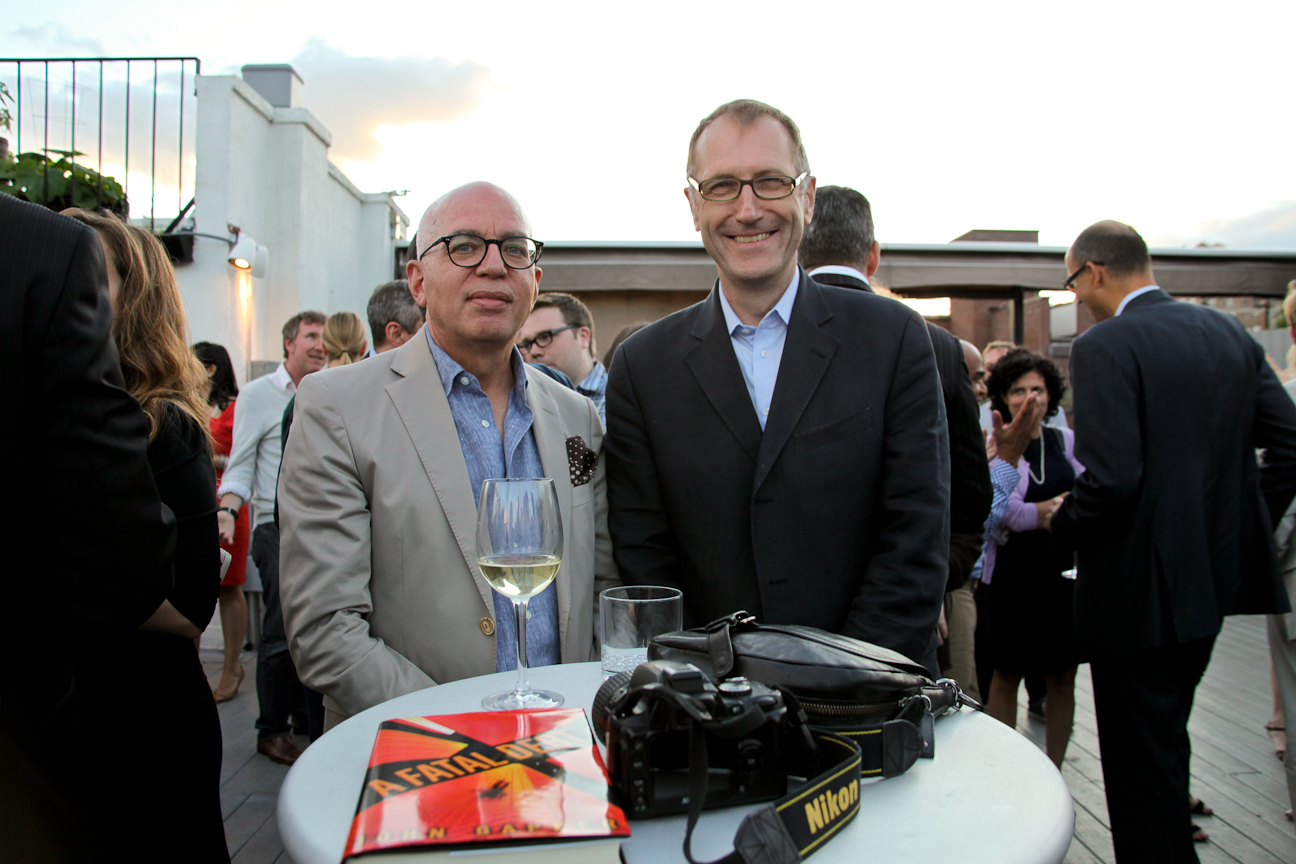
Wolff (left) with John Gapper (right) in 2012

Wolff received a 2010 Mirror Award in the category Best Commentary: Traditional Media for his work in Vanity Fair.

In 2010, Wolff became editor of the advertising trade publication Adweek. He was asked to step down one year later, amid a disagreement as to "what this magazine should be".

The Columbia Journalism Review criticized Wolff in 2010 for suggesting that The New York Times was aggressively covering the breaking News International phone hacking scandal as a way of attacking News Corporation chairman Rupert Murdoch.

=== 2020s ===
From January 2024, Wolff participated in Rewriting Trump, a 90-minute documentary, co-directed by Yasmine Permaul and Arthur Cary, produced by Sky Studios, for Sky Documentaries about Trump's return to the White House, first broadcast on February 28, 2025, and later via NOW TV. Rewriting Trump follows Wolff as he follows the election campaign, while writing his book, All or Nothing: How Trump Recaptured America.

As of 2025, Wolff has grown a following on Instagram, where he discusses and explains Trump's personal life.

Wolff has discussed Epstein and Epstein's relationship with Trump in several interviews. Wolff estimates he recorded around 100 hours of interviews with Epstein over several years. Wolff used Epstein as a source for his book Fire and Fury, and Epstein appeared to want Wolff to write his biography. In his discussions on the Trump–Epstein relationship, Wolff recounts how the President and Epstein socialized in the same New York circles and shared an interest in wealth, status, and women. According to Epstein's statements as recounted by Wolff, he was one of Trump's closest friends for a decade before they had a falling out over real estate in 2004. In November 2024, Wolff released a 2017 tape featuring Epstein discussing Trump's approach to internal politics, whereby he played members of his administration off against each other.

Wolff has alleged that Melania Trump was also acquainted with Epstein. Her legal team has since challenged the claim, and The Daily Beast, who interviewed Wolff, retracted stories referencing her ties to Epstein and apologized to her. After Melania's lawyers reportedly threatened Wolff with a $1 billion damages claim over his comments, Wolff sued her on October 22. Wolff partially covered his expenses in the lawsuit by crowdfunding on GoFundMe. In May 2026, Manhattan federal court Judge Mary Kay Vyskocil, a Trump-appointed Judge, dismissed Wolff's lawsuit, and stated that their dispute must be litigated "according to the same procedures as everyone else.”

Emails released by Congress in November 2025 showed that in the course of their exchanges, Wolff advised Epstein regarding Trump. Some journalists assessed that Wolff's conversations with Epstein violated traditional journalistic ethics, which dissuade reporters from advising their subjects. Ben Smith argued that Wolff was primarily a writer and had never been confined by traditional journalistic ethics. Wolff conceded that some of the exchanges were "embarrassing" in retrospect, but denied advising Epstein, arguing that his approach was necessary to gain Epstein's trust.

== Books ==
=== Burn Rate (1998) ===
Burn Rate: How I Survived the Gold Rush Years on the Internet is a 1998 non-fiction book by Michael Wolff, an account of Wolff's dotcom company, Wolff New Media.

=== Fire and Fury (2018) ===
In early January 2018, Wolff's book Fire and Fury: Inside the Trump White House was published. Excerpts released before publication included unflattering descriptions of behavior by U.S. President Donald Trump, chaotic interactions among the White House senior staff, and derogatory comments about the Trump family by former White House Chief Strategist Steve Bannon. News of the book's imminent publication and its embarrassing depiction of Trump prompted Trump and his lawyer, Charles Harder, to issue on January 4, 2018, a cease and desist letter alleging false statements, defamation, and malice, and to threaten libel lawsuits against Wolff, his publisher Henry Holt and Company, and Bannon, an action that actually stimulated pre-launch book sales. On January 8, Henry Holt's attorney, Elizabeth McNamara, responded to Harder's allegations with an assurance that no apology or retraction would be forthcoming, while also noting that Harder's complaint cited no specific errors in Wolff's text. John Sargent, the chief executive of Macmillan-Holt, informed the publisher's employees that "as citizens, we must demand that President Trump understand and abide by the First Amendment of our Constitution."

According to other lawyers and a historian, threats of a lawsuit by Trump against a book author and publisher were unprecedented by a sitting president attempting to suppress freedom of speech protected by the U.S. First Amendment. Before its release on January 5, the book and e-book reached number one both on Amazon.com and the Apple iBooks Store, and by January 8, over one million books had been sold or ordered.

Many of the book's details and quotes, as well as the book's accuracy as a whole, have been disputed by journalists. Several people have denied quotes published in Fire and Fury, including Tom Barrack, Tony Blair, Katie Walsh, Sean Hannity, and Anna Wintour.

While being interviewed during Fire and Fury's publicity tour, Wolff said he was "absolutely sure" President Trump was having an affair and suggested on two occasions that his partner was Nikki Haley, the United States Ambassador to the United Nations. Haley denied Wolff's allegations, calling them "disgusting". Erik Wemple of The Washington Post said that Wolff was engaging in a "remarkable multimedia slime job". Bari Weiss in The New York Times said that Wolff was "gleefully" spreading "evidence-free detail". In a February 2018 interview on Today, Wolff was asked about his claim that Trump was having an affair behind Melania Trump's back. Stating that he could not hear the question, he promptly walked off the set. The Today show later tweeted a video that included the audio from the ear piece which revealed that the question could be heard. Days earlier, after being pressed about the rumor in a college press tour interview, Wolff conceded, "I do not know if the president is having an affair."

In response to the book numerous journalists and commentators criticized Wolff. Steven Rattner referred to Wolff as an "unprincipled writer of fiction." The View host Meghan McCain criticized Wolff for publishing an off-the-record conversation with Roger Ailes in Fire and Fury. PolitiFact writer Angie Drobnic Holan noted that Fire and Fury contains several minor factual errors, including that Wilbur Ross was Trump's choice for US Secretary of Labor (rather than Secretary of Commerce).

=== Siege: Trump under Fire (2019) ===
Wolff's book, Siege: Trump Under Fire, was released on June 4, 2019. In it he claims that the Justice Department had drafted indictment documents against Trump in March 2018, accusing him of three criminal counts relating to interfering with a pending investigation and witness tampering. Special Counsel Robert Mueller is reported to have sat on these draft indictments for a year before deciding that Justice Department policy would prevent such an indictment. "The documents described do not exist," Mueller spokesman Peter Carr said, referring to the purported three-count charging document against Trump.

=== Too Famous (2021) ===
Too Famous is a collection of Wolff's essays and columns which was published in 2021. The Guardian described its tone as "sneering" and criticized it for the way it portrayed controversial celebrities including Steve Bannon, Jeffrey Epstein, and Christopher Hitchens.

=== Landslide (2021) ===
Landslide: The Final Days of the Trump Presidency, his third book about Trump, was published in 2021.

=== All or Nothing (2025) ===
All or Nothing: How Trump Recaptured America, an account of the Trump 2024 presidential campaign, was published in February 2025.

== Personal life ==
Wolff was formerly married to lawyer Alison Anthoine. The two began divorce proceedings in 2009. They have three children. He is currently married to Victoria Floethe, and they have two children.

His daughter Elizabeth is a documentary director. His daughter Susanna is a script writer and contributor to The New Yorker.

== Publications ==
- White Kids. Simon & Schuster. 1979. ISBN 978-0-671-40001-9.
- Where We Stand: Can America Make It in the Global Race for Wealth, Health, and Happiness?. Bantam Books. 1992. ISBN 978-0-553-08119-0.
- Burn Rate: How I Survived the Gold Rush Years on the Internet. Simon & Schuster. 1998. ISBN 978-0-684-85621-6.
- Autumn of the Moguls: My Misadventures With the Titans, Poseurs, and Money Guys Who Mastered and Messed Up Big Media. HarperCollins. 2003. ISBN 978-0-06-662113-5.
- The Man Who Owns the News: Inside the Secret World of Rupert Murdoch. Broadway Books. 2008. ISBN 978-0-385-52612-8.
- Television Is the New Television: The Unexpected Triumph of Old Media In the Digital Age. Penguin. 2015. ISBN 978-1-59184-813-4.
- Fire and Fury: Inside the Trump White House. Henry Holt. 2018. ISBN 978-1-250-15806-2.
- Siege: Trump Under Fire. Henry Holt. 2019. ISBN 978-1-250-25382-8.
- Landslide: The Final Days of the Trump Presidency. Henry Holt. 2021. ISBN 978-1-250-83001-2.
- The Fall: The End of Fox News and the Murdoch Dynasty. Henry Holt. 2023. ISBN 978-1-250-87927-1.
- All or Nothing: How Trump Recaptured America. Crown. 2025. ISBN 978-0593735381.
