= Charles Harder =

American lawyer (born 1969)

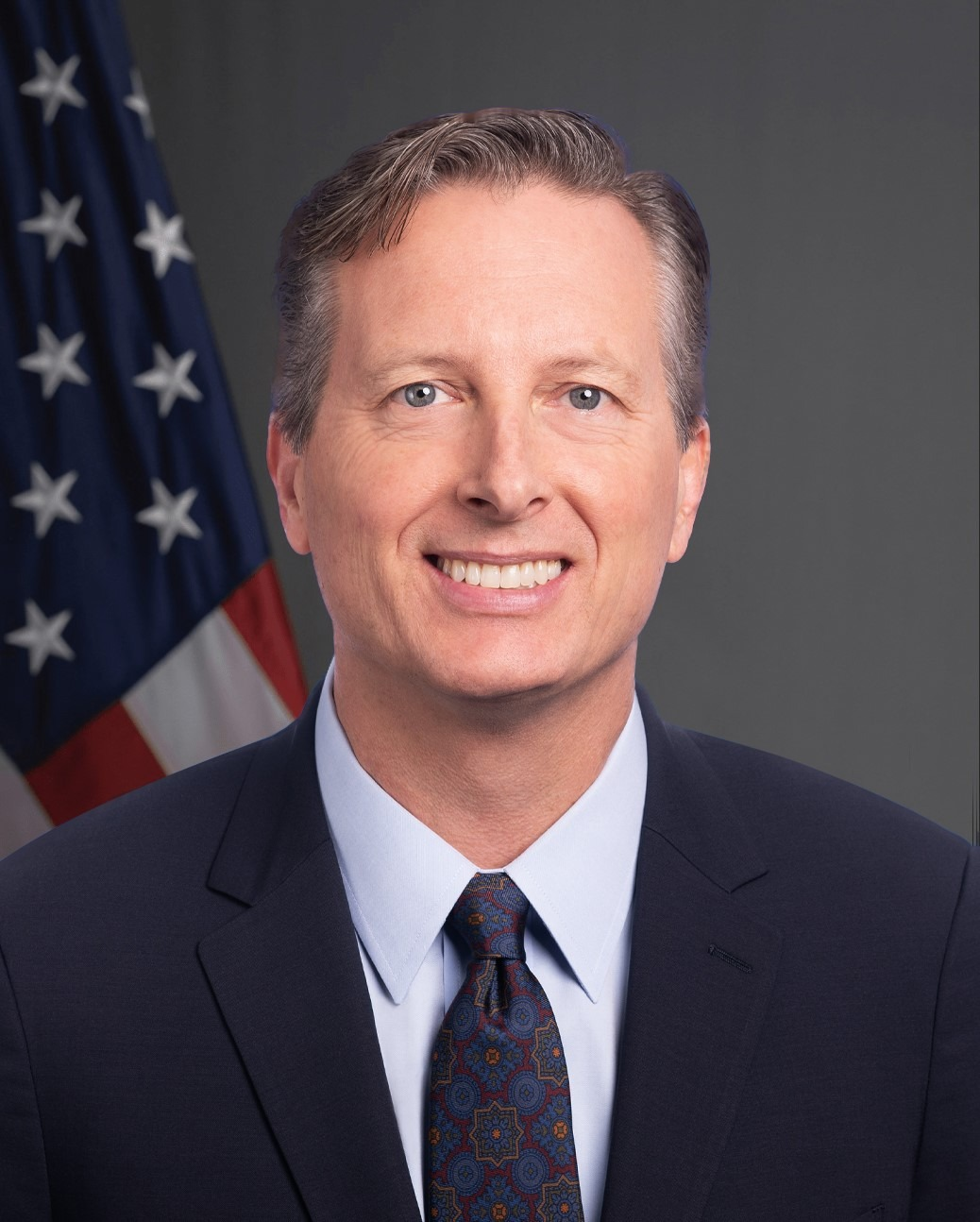
- Official portrait, 2025
- Born: Charles John Harder; November 9, 1969 (age 56); Los Angeles, California, US
- Education: University of California, Santa Cruz (BA); Loyola Marymount University (JD)
- Occupation: Lawyer

Charles John Harder (born November 9, 1969) is an American lawyer at the law firm Harder Stonerock LLP based in Los Angeles, California.

== Early career and education ==
Harder graduated from the University of California, Santa Cruz with a bachelor's degree in 1991. He earned a juris doctor degree from Loyola Law School in Los Angeles in 1996. After completing law school, Harder served as a law clerk to U.S. District Judge A. Andrew Hauk in Los Angeles.

== Notable cases ==
Harder is best known for representing Hulk Hogan (real name Terry Bollea) in the Bollea v. Gawker case. In March 2016, a Florida jury awarded Bollea $140 million in damages. The verdict led Gawker Media to file for Chapter 11 bankruptcy protection in June 2016, and the company's assets were subsequently sold at a bankruptcy court auction to Univision Communications for $135 million.

In 2007, Harder represented video game publisher Ubisoft in a one-week arbitration trial, defeating an $11 million claim by a German video game producer.

Between 2009 and 2016, Harder represented a number of celebrities over misappropriation of their names and likeness, including Sandra Bullock, George Clooney, Bradley Cooper, Jude Law, Mandy Moore, Liam Neeson, Julia Roberts and Reese Witherspoon. Harder also won ICANN arbitrations for Sandra Bullock, Cameron Diaz, Kate Hudson, and Sigourney Weaver.

In 2011, Harder won an $18 million verdict for Cecchi Gori Pictures and defeated a multi-million dollar counter-claim after a four-week trial in Los Angeles state court.

In 2017–18, Harder represented Ivan Aguilera, the heir of Mexican pop icon Juan Gabriel, against Univision and Telemundo in a $100 million defamation suit.

In 2017, Harder represented First Lady Melania Trump in a defamation case against the Daily Mail, which resulted in a $2.9 million settlement payment to Trump, and a public retraction and apology by the Daily Mail to her. In 2018, he also represented President Donald Trump in legal demand letters sent to political consultant/media executive Steve Bannon and author Michael Wolff. Harder also represented Jared Kushner in connection with a Vanity Fair article covering the 2017 Special Counsel investigation. He represented the Trump campaign in a legal action taken against Omarosa Manigault Newman following the publication of her book, Unhinged.

In 2018, Harder represented Trump in a defamation lawsuit filed by Stormy Daniels (real name Stephanie Clifford). On October 15, 2018, the U.S. District Court granted an anti-SLAPP motion filed by Harder, dismissing the lawsuit with prejudice and awarding Trump reimbursement of his attorneys fees against Stormy Daniels. On December 11, 2018, the court ordered Stormy Daniels to pay Trump 75% reimbursement of his attorneys fees or $292,052.33, plus a $1000 sanction on Stormy Daniels as well. "The court’s order," Harder said, "along with the court’s prior order dismissing Stormy Daniels’ defamation case against President Trump, together constitute a total victory for the President, and a total defeat for Stormy Daniels in this case." On July 31, 2020, the Ninth Circuit U.S. Court of Appeals affirmed the U.S. District Court's ruling, in a unanimous 3-0 decision.

In 2019, Harder sent a letter to CNN on behalf of Donald Trump and his campaign, alleging that the network misrepresented itself as a neutral news organization and threatening legal action under the federal Lanham Act. The threatened lawsuit never materialized.

In 2019, Harder sued Oakley on behalf of US Olympic gold medalist Shaun White, for using his name and image beyond the term permitted by an earlier contract between them.

In 2020, Harder sued VICE Media on behalf of BYD, a multi-billion dollar electric vehicle manufacturer based in China backed by Warren Buffett.

In recent years, Harder has also represented Binance and the Winklevoss brothers in lawsuits.

== U.S. Special Envoy for Best Future Generations ==
In June 2025, he was appointed as the U.S. Special Envoy for Best Future Generations at the United States Department of State. In this role, he works on child protection and well-being issues worldwide, including food security, education, healthcare, water and sanitation access, and efforts to end child labor, trafficking, and recruitment of children into gangs and armed conflict.. As of July 7th, 2026, the U.S. Department of State announced that Charity Wallace was sworn in as the new Special Envoy for Best Future Generations, succeeding Charles Harder.

== Publications ==
In 2021, Harder published Gawker Slayer: The Professional and Personal Adventures of Famed Attorney Charles Harder. The book includes accounts of several high-profile cases from his career, including the Bollea v. Gawker case.

- Harder, Charles J. (2011). Entertainment Law & Litigation (2026 ed.). LexisNexis. ISBN 9780769868325.
- Harder, Charles J. (2021). Gawker Slayer: The Professional and Personal Adventures of Famed Attorney Charles Harder. ISBN 9798595872331.

== Personal life ==
Harder bicycled across the US at age of 19.
