= Pathfinder (website) =

Early web portal, 1994-1999

Pathfinder.com
- Website type: Web portal
- Available in: English
- Owner: Time Inc. (Time Warner)
- Website: www.pathfinder.com/pathfinder/
- Launched: 1994; 32 years ago
- Current status: Closed in April 1999; URL redirects to Dotdash Meredith's website

Pathfinder was a landing page with links to various Time Inc. websites. In its initial form, Pathfinder was one of the first web portals, created as Time Warner's entry onto the Internet. The objective of Pathfinder was to be an all-encompassing site that brought the best content from all of Time Warner under one banner. Launched in 1994, the site was closed in April 1999 and was widely considered to be an expensive failure.

== History ==
The site opened on October 24, 1994, with a small content team led by Paul Sagan, Walter Isaacson, James Kinsella, Bruce Judson, Craig Bromberg, Oliver Knowlton, and Curt Viebranz. The team grew rapidly to service a growing list of internal "content partners" - at its highest point, these "content partners" numbered 80. Most of these content partners were Time Inc. magazines such as Time, People, Fortune and others, but others came from the widely distributed Time Warner (now Warner Bros. Discovery) corporate empire.

Pathfinder.com was controversial within Time Warner. Many content partners were unhappy with the fact Pathfinder's existence prevented them from using their own URLs. For example, People Magazine was not allowed to use the domain "people.com," but was instead restricted to a directory on Pathfinder (pathfinder.com/people/). Pathfinder's own staff were shocked when Time Inc. senior manager Don Logan publicly derided Pathfinder.com at an external analyst's meeting as a "black hole" of unprofitability.

Pathfinder went through many managers and editors in its short life, and suffered from high staff turnover rates, especially after it became clear to many that its future was highly uncertain. Many early tech journalists and writers passed through its doors, including Walter Isaacson, James Kinsella (MSNBC), Daniel Okrent, John R. Quain (CBS News Up to the Minute and J-Q on Technology), John Voelcker (GreenCarReports.com), Josh Quittner, Lev Grossman, Maura Johnston and Steven Petrow.

The site was closed in April 1999, and was widely considered to be an expensive failure. Some claim that Pathfinder cost Time Inc. between $100 and $120 million.

Some analysts believe that Pathfinder's failure led Time Warner's senior managers to conclude that it was impossible to run a successful Internet portal, and this judgement led directly to Time Warner pursuing its eventual merger with AOL, a merger which unsuccessfully sought to generate "synergy" between the two corporate giants.

Pathfinder.com transitioned to a landing page, with links to Time Inc.'s other sites.
