= Eyejot =

Eyejot was one of the first video mail web applications. Introduced at DEMO 2007, Eyejot made it possible for its users to create, send and manage video mail. The Eyejot model is similar to other email systems in that it maintains its messages online and doesn't require any special client based software for access, just a web browser. At the time of its introduction Eyejot supported synchronization with iPods and Apple TV through iTunes. When the iPhone was introduced Eyejot quickly added native MP4 support enabling iPhone users to reach their video inbox through the platform's Safari browser.

== Business features ==
In 2008 Eyejot introduced two professional versions for users that wanted additional features or to use the platform for commercial purposes. Eyejot's PRO version extended recording durations from the 60 seconds offered with the free version to five (5) minutes. It also allowed for pre-recorded video to be uploaded and sent instead of recording live video with a webcam. Eyejot's PRO Plus version added the ability for users to brand several interface elements with their logo and color scheme, manage a library of templates and attach common computer files (images, Office documents, PDFs, etc.).
