= Burn rate =

Rate at which a company is losing money

Burn rate is the rate at which a company consumes its cash. It is typically expressed in monthly terms and used for startups. E.g., "the company's burn rate is currently $65,000 per month." In this sense, the word "burn" is a synonymous term for negative cash flow. It is also a measure of how fast a company will use up its shareholder capital. If the shareholder capital is exhausted, the company will either have to start making a profit, find additional funding, or close down.

Burn rate can also refer to how quickly individuals spend their money, particularly their discretionary income. For example, Mackenzie Investments commissioned a test to gauge the spending and saving behavior of Canadians to determine if they are “Overspenders”.

Burn rate is also used in project management to determine the rate at which hours (allocated to a project) are being used, to identify when work is going out of scope, or when efficiencies are being lost. The term is also used in biology, to refer to a person's basic metabolic rate; in rocketry, it refers to the rate at which a rocket is burning fuel; and in chemistry, it refers to the rate at which a compound or substance burns.

== History ==
The term came into common use during the dot-com era when many start-up companies went through several stages of funding before emerging into profitability and positive cash flows and thus becoming self-sustainable (or, as for the majority, failing to find additional funding and sustainable business models and thus going bankrupt). In between funding events, burn rate becomes an important management measure, since together with the available funds, it provides a time measure to when the next funding event needs to take place.

Some entrepreneurs and investors say that part of the reasons behind the dot-com bust was the unsound management and financial investor practices to keep the burn rate up, taking it as a proxy for how fast the start-up company was acquiring a customer base.

== In project management ==
In project management, burn rate is the rate at which a project's budget is being spent, used to flag scope creep or lost efficiencies.
