= Rick Boyce =

American businessman

Rick Boyce was an early marketeer in the commercialization of the World Wide Web.

A media buyer with the San Francisco ad agency Hal Riney & Partners, Boyce was recruited by HotWired's chief executive officer, Andrew Anker, to be HotWired's director of business development when the company was founded in the fall of 1994. Boyce was responsible for organizing the first, widespread effort to sell banner ads. The sale of banner ads was the primary source of income for commercial publishing efforts on the World Wide Web between 1994 and 2000.

When Wired Magazine sold HotWired to Lycos, Boyce was named Lycos' vice president of sales. In 1999, he became the president of Snowball.com, an online entertainment company. In 2002, Snowball.com changed its name to IGN Entertainment, and in 2005 it became a division of Fox Interactive Media, Inc.
