= List of tech companies in the New York metropolitan area =

Technology companies in the New York City metropolitan area represent a significant and growing economic component of the New York metropolitan area, the most populous combined statistical area in the United States and one of the most populous urban agglomerations in the world. New York is a top-tier global high technology hub. Silicon Alley, once a metonym for the sphere encompassing the metropolitan region's high technology industries, is no longer a relevant moniker as the city's tech environment has expanded dramatically both in location and in its scope. New tech establishments include those of Israeli companies in New York City, at a rate of ten new startups per month, and the technology sector has been claiming a greater share of New York City's economy since 2010. Tech:NYC, founded in 2016, is a nonprofit organization which represents New York City's technology industry with government, civic institutions, in business, and in the media and whose primary goals are to attract tech talent to the city and to advocate for policies that will help tech companies grow.

The following is a partial and growing list of notable New York metropolitan area tech companies:

== Apps ==
- FanDuel
- Trello

== Artificial intelligence ==
- Dataminr
- Enigma Technologies
- Hugging Face
- IBM Watson

== Cloud and database services ==
- MongoDB
- BetterCloud
- IBM
- KeyMe
- LiveTiles
- SimpleReach
- SocialFlow
- Zeta Global
- Modal

== Digital media ==
- 33Across
- AppNexus
- Arkadium
- Behance
- Dotdash Meredith
- DoubleClick
- Innovid
- Invite Media
- JW Player
- Kaltura
- Mic
- SoundCloud
- Spotify
- Squarespace
- Stack Exchange
- Taboola
- Vimeo
- Zola Books

== Financial technology (Fintech) ==
- Betterment
- Bloomberg L.P.
- E-Trade
- Finco Services Inc
- Ramp
- SeedInvest
- Stash (company)
- Two Sigma

== Hardware ==
- HTC
- Huawei
- IBM
- LG Electronics
- Nokia Bell Labs
- Samsung Electronics
- TCL Corporation
- ZTE

== Health services technology ==
- Oscar Health
- Elaborate
- Phreesia
- Zocdoc

== Life insurance ==
- Haven Life

== Software ==
- Animoto
- Atavist
- Barnes & Noble Nook
- CA Technologies
- Cockroach Labs
- Cognizant
- ConsenSys
- Datadog
- DigitalOcean
- Enterproid
- Glitch
- Greenhouse Software
- Helix Software Company
- Impelsys
- Infor
- letgo
- LivePerson
- Mediaocean
- MongoDB
- Oscar Health
- Q-Sensei
- Safefood 360°
- Telmar (company)
- Videology
- Yext

=== Software as a service (SaaS) ===
- Diligent
- Medidata Solutions

== Other services ==
- Andela
- Birchbox
- Blue Apron
- Cambridge Analytica
- CARTO
- ClassPass
- Etsy
- Foursquare
- Gilt Groupe
- Integral Ad Science
- Jet.com
- Kickstarter
- LifeBEAM
- littleBits
- Mimeo, Inc
- OkCupid
- Paddle8
- Panjiva
- Rent the Runway
- Seamless
- SeatGeek
- Shapeways
- Sharp Electronics Corporation USA
- ShopKeep
- Shutterstock
- Skillshare
- Squarefoot
- Peloton

== Historical ==
During the 1960s and 1970s, there were a number of technology firms, especially software companies, founded in New York City. These included:

- Advanced Computer Techniques
- Computer Applications, Inc.
- Computer Usage Company (founded 1950s)
- Decision Strategy Corporation
- Information Builders

In addition, there were some companies located outside the city but within the greater New York metropolitan area. These included:

- Applied Data Research
- Concurrent Computer Corporation
- Syncsort

== See also ==
- List of biotech and pharmaceutical companies in the New York metropolitan area
- List of companies based in New York City
- Silicon Alley
- Silicon Hills
- Tech Valley
