= Thomas Frey =

American futurist author and speaker

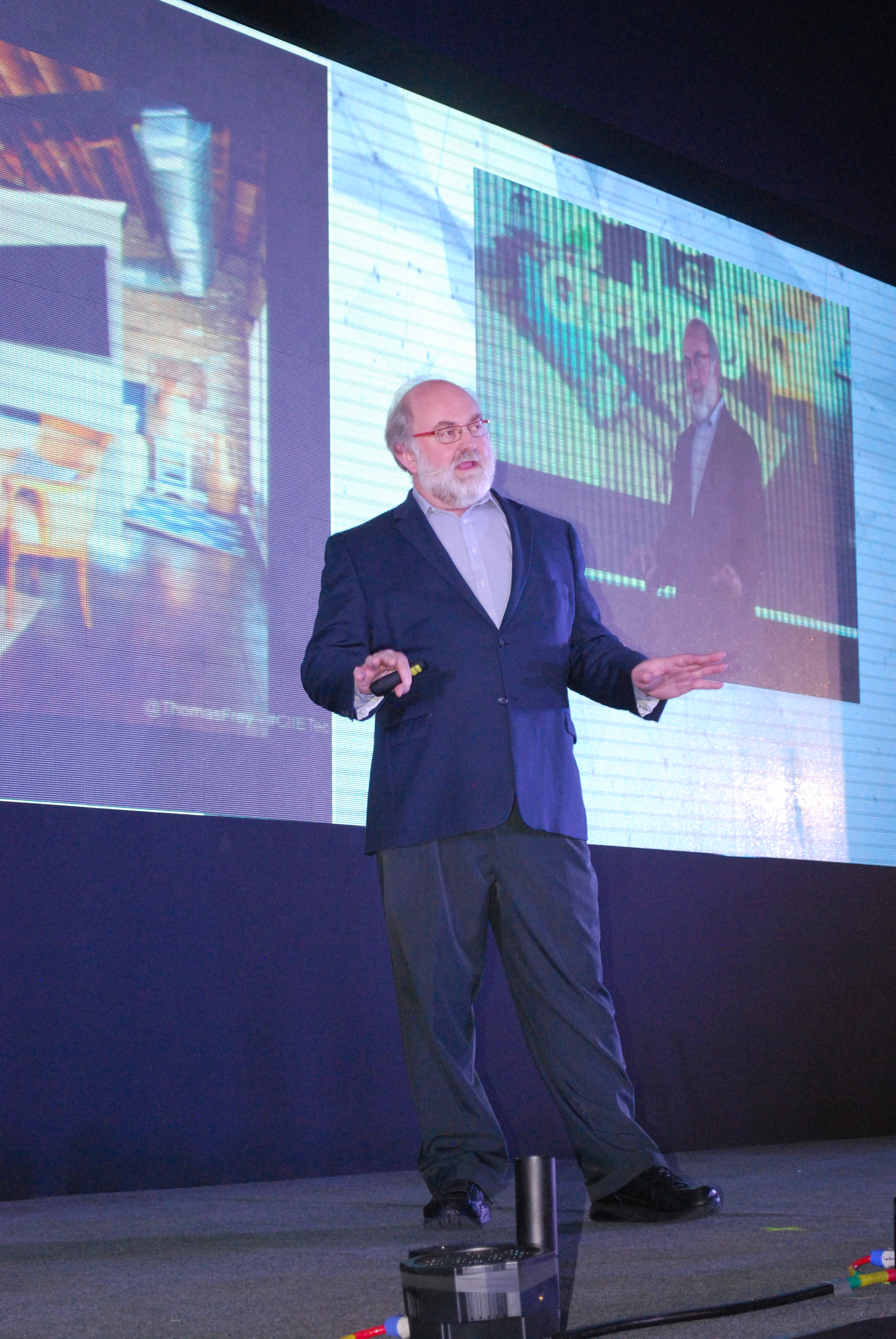
Frey presenting at the Tec de Monterrey, Mexico City campus

Thomas Frey is an American futurist, author, storyteller, and celebrity speaker.

Frey was the founder of the DaVinci Institute in Westminster, Colorado, but currently serves as the executive director and senior futurist of Futurist Speaker Inc. Before this, he was an engineer with IBM for fifteen years, during which he received over 270 awards, the highest number for any IBM engineer at the time.

In 2024, Frey was named “Futurist of the Year” by Copernicus University in Toruń, Poland.

He is part of the celebrity speaking circuit and has shared billing with King Willem-Alexander, Former Finnish Prime Minister Sanna Marin, Rahm Emanuel, Former New Zealand Prime Minister Jacinda Ardern, Ron Klain, Kevin McCarthy, Tom Peters, Muhammad Yunus, Joseph Stiglitz, Jimmy Wales, and Jack Welch. Frey's clients are located both internationally and in the United States, speaking to audiences of high-level government officials such as those of NASA, executives of Fortune 500 companies such as IBM and AT&T, Lucent Technologies, First Data, Boeing, Capital One, Bell Canada, Visa, Ford Motor Company and Qwest. He has travelled to South Korea, Turkey, Saudi Arabia, India, Russia, Germany, China, Mexico and many other countries.

Frey has been interviewed in numerous publications such as The New York Times, The Huffington Post, The Times of India, USA Today, U.S. News & World Report, The Futurist, Morning Calm (in-flight magazine of Korean Air), Skylife (in-flight magazine of Turkish Airlines), ColoradoBiz Magazine, and Rocky Mountain News.

At the institute, he works to develop original research studies in areas not normally addressed by futurists. He has predicted the end of traditional colleges and printed books, but not the library.

Frey is the author of the 2011 book Communicating with the Future , the 2017 book Epiphany Z, 8 Radical Visions for Transforming Your Future, and the 2022 book Future Like A Boss, How Thinking Like a Futurist Will Help You Anticipate the World of Tomorrow.

As a regular podcast guest, Frey has been featured on the KOA Mandy Connell Show, Future Imperfect with Brett King and Katie Schultz, Reimagining Tomorrow with Paul Heller, The Polymath Podcast with Dustin Miller, The Goodstory Podcast with Chitra Raghavan, and many more.

Frey regularly shares his visionary insights through his biweekly column on his blog, FuturistSpeaker.com. These articles delve into some of the most intriguing and thought-provoking aspects of the future, covering a wide range of topics such as technological innovation, societal transformation, and emerging global trends. Frey's columns reflect his deep expertise and unique ability to forecast changes while providing actionable ideas for individuals and organizations navigating an uncertain future.
