= 3 Park Avenue =

Skyscraper in Manhattan, New York

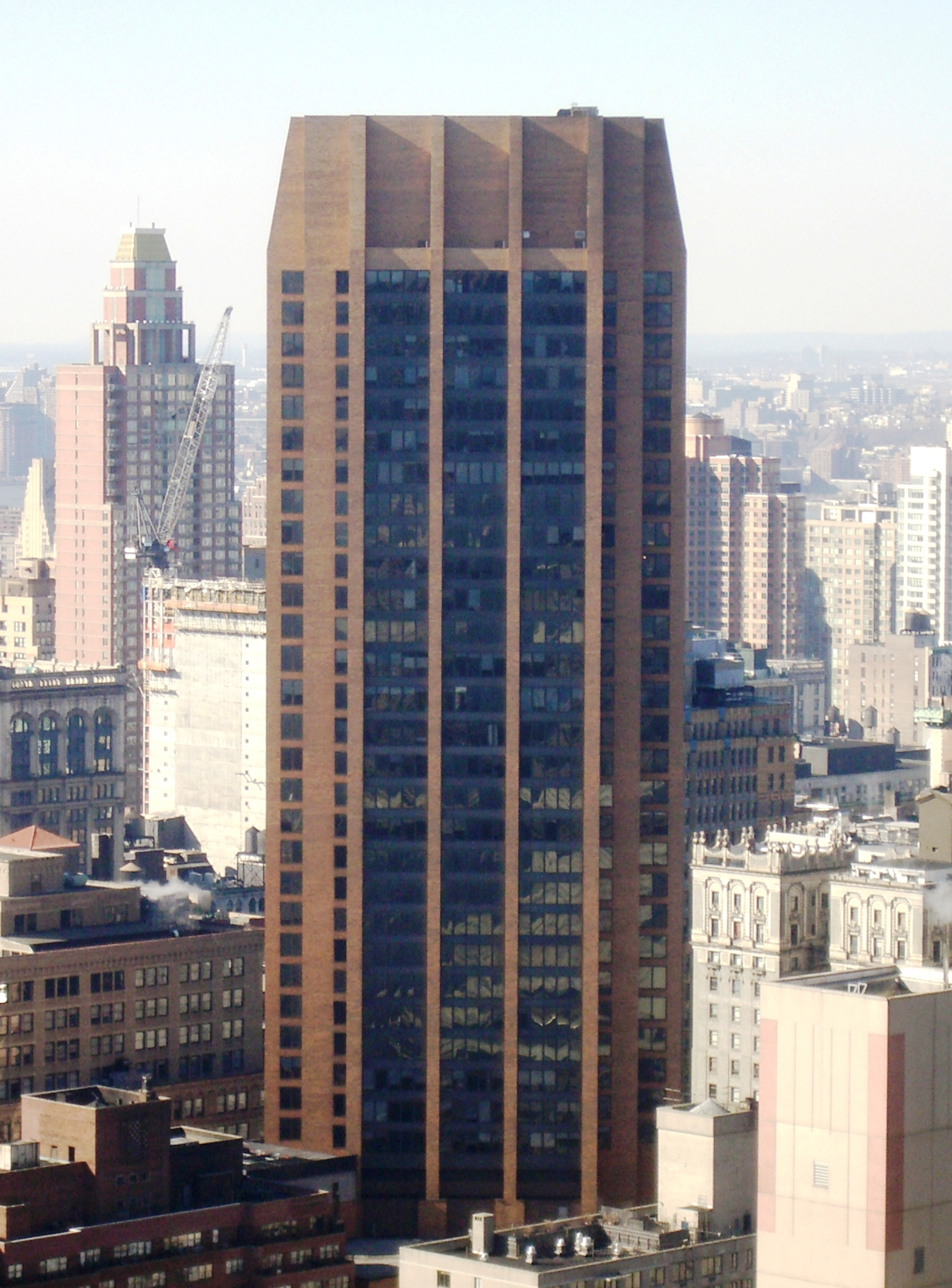
- From the northeast
- Interactive map of the 3 Park Avenue area

General information
- Status: Completed
- Type: Commercial and educational
- Location: 3 Park Avenue; New York, NY 10016; United States
- Coordinates: 40°44′47″N 73°58′52″W
- Opening: 1973
- Owner: Cohen Brothers Realty Corporation (Office); New York City Educational Construction Fund (Lower floors)

Height
- Roof: 556 feet (169 m)

Technical details
- Floor count: 42
- Lifts/elevators: 12

Design and construction
- Architect: Shreve, Lamb and Harmon
- Structural engineer: Rosenwasser/Grossman Consulting Engineers, P.C.

3 Park Avenue is a mixed-use office building and high school erected in 1973 on Park Avenue in Manhattan, New York City. The building, surrounded on three sides by a plaza, is categorized as a Midtown South address in the Kips Bay, Manhattan, Murray Hill, and Rose Hill neighborhoods. It is located between East 33rd and 34th Streets, close to the 33rd Street subway station (served by the 4, 6, and <6> trains), an entrance to which is built into the building.

== Architecture ==
The building was designed by Shreve, Lamb and Harmon, designers of the Empire State Building. Rosenwasser/Grossman Consulting Engineers, P.C. is listed as the structural engineering firm for the building in 2014. The 42-story building consists of a combination of commercial tenants and several specialty schools including Unity Center for Urban Technologies, Manhattan Academy for Arts and Language, Success Academy High School for the Liberal Arts, and Murray Hill Academy. The Norman Thomas High School was formerly located in the building. The Emporis website documents 12 elevators within the building, a virtual address of "101–111 East 33rd Street" and an architectural height of 169.47 metres (556.0 ft).

The building is notable for its diagonal alignment and the bright light colored bricks used for its construction and the same bricks are used for the small plaza at the building's main entrance. A sculpture titled "Obelisk to Peace", created by Irving Marantz in 1972, is situated at the main entrance and is a height of 23 feet (7.0 m), made from bronze and is set on a polished granite base. The sculpture was Marantz's last outdoor work before his death.

The entrance to the school is on the East 33rd Street side of the building, where arcade and plaza space (which surrounds the three sides of the building facing the street) exists; although a bench is situated at the entrance, New York State Penal Law prohibits trespassing. In 2000, the space on the 34th Street side was almost identical to the 33rd Street arcade and plaza, but lacked a bench and sign.

== History ==
Prior to the construction of 3 Park Avenue, the site contained the armory of the 71st Regiment, New York National Guard. The first armory of the 71st Regiment burnt down in 1902 and a replacement was completed in 1905 on a slightly larger section of land. The architectural firm of Clinton and Russell designed the second armory and in 1935 it was described as "Manhattan's ugly old brownstone" by Time magazine, which was a reflection of a wider perception of the structure. The armory was eventually demolished during the 1960s and a decade passed before the site was redeveloped.

In 2000, the building was owned by Three Park Avenue Building Company LP. By 2014, the property formed part of the Cohen Brothers Realty Corporation's portfolio in June 2014.

The building's lobby was renovated in 2001. In 2016, Cohen Brothers retained César Pelli's Pelli Clarke Pelli architects to design a renovation of the lobby. Changes included new metal canopies, gray granite, and columns at the exterior plaza, renovations of the 25,000 square feet (2,300 m^{2}) of retail space, and new wood paneling, glass walls, lighting, and elevator cabs for the lobby. In December 2018, Citibank provided $182 million in debt to refinance the building. Between 2019 and 2023, the occupancy rate decreased from 85% to 54% after two major tenants, TransPerfect and Icon Capital, moved out. As a result, in 2024, the building's $182 million loan went into special servicing. 3 Park Avenue's loan left special servicing in 2026.

== Tenants ==
As of 2014, the list of tenants in the building includes:

- IEEE Communications Society – 17th floor
- adMarketplace – 27th floor
- Mimeo, Inc – 22nd Floor
- Major League Gaming – 32nd floor
- JCDecaux North America – 33rd floor

== In popular culture ==
The building is featured in the 2005 HBO documentary Left of the Dial, a film about the Air America radio station, a previous tenant of the building.
