= Videology =

- Type: Private
- Industry: Advertising and Software
- Founded: 2007
- Founder: Scott Ferber
- Headquarters: New York City
- Area served: Global
- Key people: Scott Ferber, Chairman and CEO
- Products: Video advertising software
- Number of employees: 300
- Parent: Singtel
- Website: www.videologygroup.com

Videology was an advertising software company based in New York City. It was founded in 2007 as Tidal TV and launched a Hulu competitor in 2008. In 2012, it was rebranded as Videology and now develops software that sends ads to specific demographics within an audience of video viewers, performs analytics, and other functions.

== History ==
The idea for Videology was conceived in 2006 when founder Scott Ferber heard AOL Time Warner CEO Jeff Bewkes express concern that distribution of television content online might reduce cable subscriptions. Videology was initially founded to develop software to stream television programming online. The company officially began operations in 2007 under the name Tidal TV. It was founded in Baltimore by Ferber. In its first year of operation, Tidal TV raised $15 million in venture funding. Beta testing of its video streaming software began in 2008.

In June 2008, the company launched a free television-watching site that competed with sites like Hulu and Joost. According to U.S. News & World Report and Read Write Web, the website had a good selection of channels and ran smoothly, but was not well-known. At the time Hulu was still in beta and shortly afterwards introduced a user interface similar to Tidal TV's. Tidal TV served 84,000 viewers in its first month, compared to Hulu's 9.7 million viewers during the same time period. However, Tidal TV continued to expand its programming and staff. By 2009, it was selling specific demographic audiences to advertisers using algorithms and analytics. The company had just 40 employees in 2010 and 80 by 2011. Another $30 million in funding was raised in March 2011 and by 2012 it had $200 million in revenues.

In 2012 Tidal TV was renamed to Videology. With the rebrand, it introduced new software products for content publishers selling advertising. Later that year it acquired an advertising marketplace, LucidMedia, for an undisclosed sum, and a data management company, Collider, for $13.2 million. Videology raised another $60 million in 2013, reaching a total of $120 million in funding. By 2014, it had operations in 28 countries, up from three in 2011. In 2014, Videology said half of its revenues were coming from television advertising budgets and it created a TV division within the company. Its headquarters were moved to New York City in August 2016.

Videology announced chapter 11 bankruptcy in May 2018, and was subsequently acquired by the Singtel Group that owns the Amobee brand.

== Software ==
Videology developed software for advertisers, content publishers and viewers that uses algorithms and analytics to target different demographics with different ads while watching television programming or other digital video content. Advertising space for targeted demographics is then sold at a premium. Its revenue model is a mix of software licensing and deals where it is paid a percentage of advertising spend. According to the company's website, it sells software products for advertising analytics, optimization (revenue and scenario planning), and management respectively. Its software is integrated with AT&T and Adobe advertising systems to allow advertisers to send custom ads to different demographics. The software is also licensed by Canadian broadcasters Bell Media and Rogers Media.

=== History ===
Videology released an update called Descartes in 2013, which introduced a new user interface, as well as more advertising management and targeting features. In 2014, it announced a partnership with Mediaocean in order to integrate Videology software with Spectra, a common software application used by advertisers to shop for placements.

In January 2016 Videology added data from third-party vendors DoubleVerify, Integral Ad Science and Moat, to verify the number of people viewing an advertisement and allow advertising to be purchased based on the number of verified impressions. In April 2016, Videology increased its use of Nielsen data. Videology's data is matched to Nielsen's in order to observe the behavior of audiences across television and internet mediums.

== Operations ==
The company publishes a quarterly "U.S. Video Market At-A-Glance" report, based on data from the advertisements running on its software.

== See also ==
- Tech companies in the New York metropolitan area
