= Mimeo =

Mimeo (possibly derived from the Greek word mimema for "something imitated") may refer to:

- M.I.M.E.O. – an experimental music group
- Mimeograph machine
- Mimeo – an unpublished academic paper, formerly often distributed with the aid of mimeograph machines.
- Mimeo, Inc - an online publishing company
