= Impelsys =

Technology company located in New York

- Type: Private
- Industry: IT Services
- Founded: January 2001; 25 years ago
- Headquarters: New York City
- Area served: Worldwide
- Key people: Sameer Shariff; Founder & CEO Vinod Kumar TV; Chief operating officer (COO) Deepak Kaushik; Chief financial officer (CFO)
- Services: Software as a Service
- Website: www.impelsys.com

Impelsys is a global technology company founded in January 2001. The company is headquartered in New York and operates in the United States, European Union, and India. It supports businesses worldwide in their transition to digital-first, data-driven operations.

== History ==
Sameer Shariff founded Impelsys in January 2001 in New York. He is an alumnus of the University of Pennsylvania and the Wharton School of Business. Initially, the company developed digital platforms for e-books and learning management systems. In 2009, they built the ipublishcentral product. This platform allowed publishers to have a digital warehouse to store all their content, which could then be distributed to various retail outlets like Amazon, Barnes and Noble, and many others. Impelsys expanded into healthcare, publishing, information services, and education.

In 2020, the company launched its iPC Health platform, which provided training and skill development programs for healthcare staff, along with a learning management system for hospitals. In 2021, the company spun off iPC Health into a separate entity and rebranded it as MedLern. In April 2021, MedLern partnered with RCNi, a unit of the Royal College of Nursing UK, to provide the CPD Certification programs to Indian hospitals. Impelsys also launched iPC Scholar in 2021, which utilizes AI and machine learning infrastructure to develop e-learning tools. In 2023, Impelsys opened an advanced medical device testing lab in Mangaluru, Karnataka, and partnered with Laerdal. In March 2023, Anand Ramachandran was appointed as CRO and Barry Bealer as Vice President for Publishing, Information, and Education.

== Corporate affairs ==
=== Leadership ===
Impelsys is managed by CEO and Founder, Sameer Shariff.

Other key executives are:

- Deepak Kaushik, Chief Financial Officer
- Anand Ramachandran, Chief Revenue Officer
- Uday Majithia, Vice President – Solutions and Service Delivery
- Vinod Sundaresan, Vice President – Technology Services
- Vipin Chandran, Vice President – Head of Business Unit, Heart Bangalore
- Barry Bealer – Vice President – Americas Sales
- Puneet Agrawal, Vice President – Europe Sales
- Swaroop Chandra BS, Vice President – Marketing and Communications
- Kavitha Nandagopal, Vice President – Human Resources and Talent Acquisition

=== Clients ===
Impelsys has a customer base of over 200 publishers globally. MIT Press, Wolters Kluwer and Sesame Street were early adopters of iPublishCentral. Other major clients include McGraw-Hill Education, HarperCollins, and Encyclopædia Britannica, Inc.

Impelsys also serves customers from other industries such as healthcare, information services and education. Notably their customers include the American Heart Association, Laerdal, Prognos, NCUK, RCNi, Informa, Elsevier, and more.

== Awards and recognition ==
2021

- Impelsys was declared the winner of the AWS ISV Innovation Cup 2021 during the Amazon AI Conclave.

2023

- Won the Diamond Award for the Best eLearning Project category at the LearnX Awards 2023.
- The company secured the Bronze Award in the Learning and Development category for "Best Advance in Creating a Learning Strategy" at the Brandon Hall Group HCM Excellence Awards.
- The company has also received the Great Place To Work® certification for three consecutive years.

== See also ==
- Tech companies in the New York metropolitan area
