= Lenddo =

- Type: Private
- Industry: Finance and software
- Founded: 2011
- Fate: Defunct
- Headquarters: Singapore
- Website: include1billion.com

Lenddo (subsequently LenddoEFL) was a Singapore-based software-as-a-service company which used nontraditional data comprising social media and smartphone records in order to ascertain customers' financial stability. Its vision was “to improve financial inclusion for at least a billion people" in developing countries around the world. In October 2013, Lenddo had more than 350,000 members globally. In October 2017, Lenddo merged with company Entrepreneurial Finance Lab (EFL), and was subsequently named, LenddoEFL.

== History ==
Founded in 2011 by co-founders Jeffrey Stewart and Richard Eldridge, Lenddo initially operated an online lending operation in three countries: the Philippines (since 2011), Colombia (since 2012) and Mexico (since 2013). The company started when Stewart and Eldridge were running technology companies in the Philippines and several other emerging markets. "Their skilled young staff often asked for loans ... With repayment rates in microfinance as high as 98% in multiple regions, the opportunity seemed obvious." By January 2011 the company was launched, and by March they had issued their first loan.

Lenddo closed a Series A round of funding in venture capital in May 2012 from investors including Accel Partners, Blumberg Capital, Inovia Capital and Omidyar Network. In 2013, Lenddo received an additional $6 million funding from investors including Kickstart Ventures, Golden Gate Ventures and the co-founder of Skype, Toivo Annus, to fund its planned expansion across Southeast Asia.

In January 2015, Lenddo announced expanding its credit scoring and identity verification solutions to third parties globally. By October 2015, the company raised capital in series B1 and by January 2016, confirmed its international exposure by opening offices in India. At the peak of its global operations, the company had an extended presence across Latin America, South Asia and Southeast Asia and had onboarded more than 200,000 applicants every month.

In October 2017, Lenddo merged with the Boston-headquartered startup Entrepreneurial Finance Lab (EFL).The merged entity was known as LenddoEFL. Lenddo CEO Richard Eldridge continued on as the CEO of the company.

A year following the merger, in April 2019, a new CEO was appointed, Paolo Montessori with founder Richard Eldridge stepping down to a non-executive role. This new regime led to scandal for LenddoEFL as a news article published in TechinAsia in June 2020 hinted at culture clashes with former EFL employees, organizational structure and funding issues and the connection of Nordaq company to Paul L Devine, formerly the CEO of NordAq Energy Inc (NordAq). Paul L Devine had, just two years prior been embroiled in court litigation with NordAq over allegations of fraud. The charges were subsequently dismissed with prejudice in early 2019. The news article cited Paul L Devine as being actively involved in the internal operations of LenddoEFL as CFO, leading employees to not receive compensation for several months, for vendors not to be paid, and for numerous lay offs including closure of offices in other countries.

Following the first article, a follow-up story was published by TechinAsia in August 2020. SenaHill APAC had indicated that LenddoEFL had failed to pay fees amounting to $600,000 following a $1,000,000 undisclosed financial transaction of the company. The article also indicated the quiet departure of CEO, Paolo Montessori, leaving Paul L Devine CFO and simultaneously Chairman of the Board at the helm alongside James Hume, COO, formerly of eServGlobal alongside Paolo Montessori.

By April 2021, continued trouble in the company lead to an internal announcement over email by COO James Hume for LenddoEFL to cease its Verification services by the end of July 2021. The LenddoEFL verification and psychometric services on its website has then since been taken down.

== Strategy ==
Lenddo's target credit customers are primarily subject to emerging economies, in which financial records are limited, while social data is prevalent. According to Golden Gate Ventures partner Vinnie Lauria, there are nearly 610 million individuals in Southeast Asia to whom banks are hesitant to lend. Lenddo bypasses the need for a historical credit score through its own scoring system, based on social data. In order to apply, one must first accumulate a minimum score (called "LenddoScore") of 300. The user is scored based on 3 main factors—their social network activity (using data from Facebook, LinkedIn, Twitter, Gmail, and Yahoo accounts), a user's "Trusted Connections" (character references that will vouch for the borrower), and financial performance, if the person is a repeat borrower.

Mother Jones published an article in September 2013 which discusses a concern that credit companies who use social media like Lenddo, LendUp, Moven, Neo, Kabbage, and Kreditech may "be discriminating against applicants who essentially appear socially undesirable." David Jacobs, of the Electronic Privacy Information Center, states that there is a "general risk caused by using personal information to clarify and sort people and determine who is a high-value consumer and who is not worth engaging with." Furthermore, he is worried about the possibility of "digital redlining," referring to the practice of banks refusing to issue loans in poor or minority neighborhoods, despite the fact that the eligibility of a person to get a loan is decided by algorithms. In response, Jeff Stewart defended the use of social media to assess borrowers by stating that the ability to provide financial assistance to people who would otherwise not be served outweighs the possibility of inaccuracy in credit-making decisions.

== Awards ==
Lenddo was a winner of a FinTech Startup Award in 2011 and recognized as one of the top 15 global most innovative financial services companies in 2012 at Sibos. The World Economic Forum recently recognized Lenddo as one of its Technology Pioneers for 2014.

Lenddo was awarded with the Mondato Asian MFC Innovation of the Year Award in October 2015 that acknowledges the MFC provider whose product or service exhibited the most innovation in their given market in Emerging Asia during 2015–2016.
