= Telmar (company) =

American multi-nation advertising company

TelmarHelixa
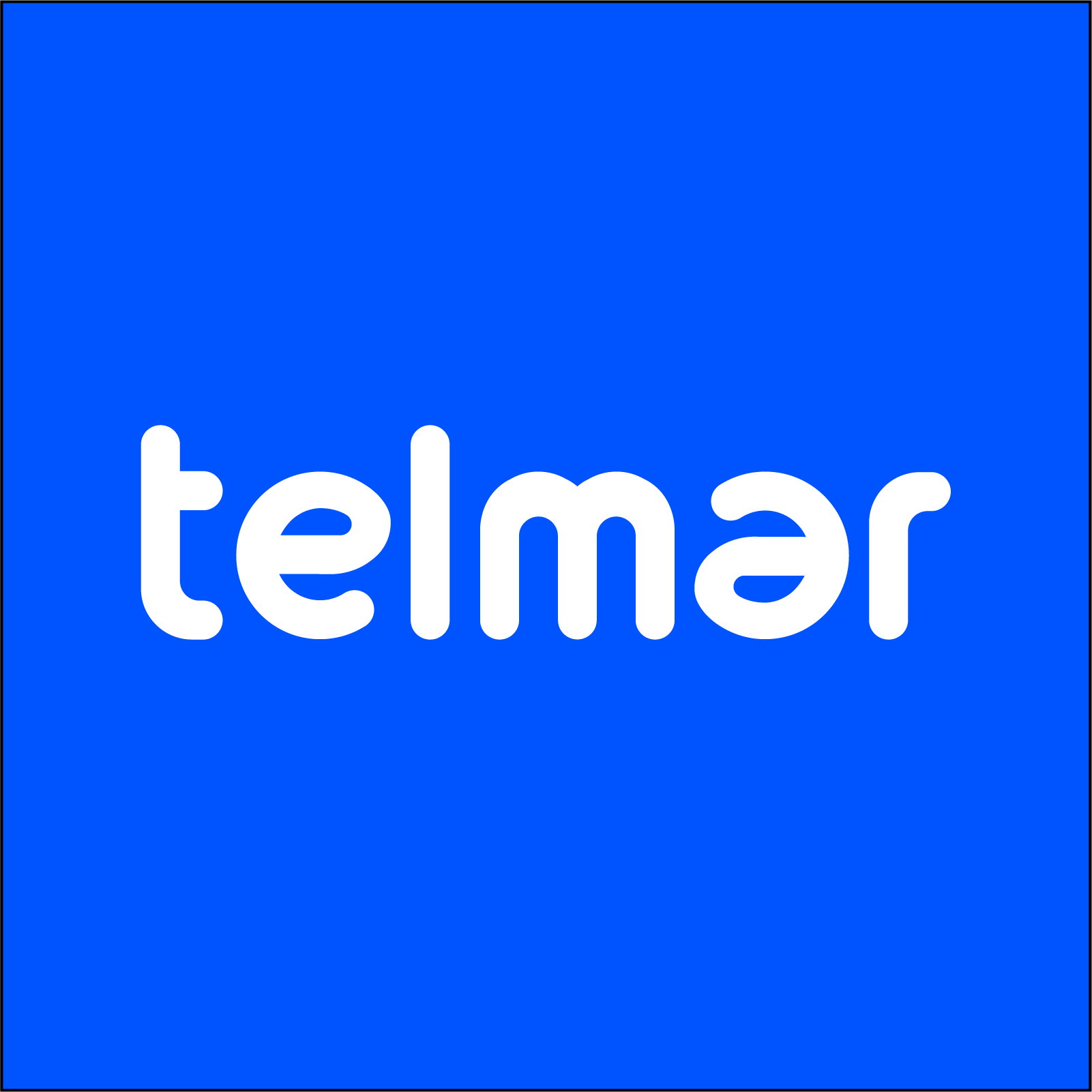
- Type: Private
- Industry: Media, advertising, data analytics
- Founded: 1968
- Headquarters: New York City
- Key people: James Ingram (CEO), Sam Williams (COO)
- Products: Media planning services
- Website: www.telmarhelixa.com

TelmarHelixa is a multinational SaaS media technology company headquartered in New York City providing media planning, data analytic services to advertising and media FTSE 100, FTSE 250, Nasdaq 100 and S&P 500 companies and broadcasters including the BBC, Canal+, Discovery and EuroSport. The company was founded in 1968 and operates in North America, EMEA and APAC.

Telmar’s SaaS provide the media and advertising sector with tools to analyse large amounts of data and plan campaigns through advanced targeting, analysis, and reporting, data integration and visualization, media/multi media campaign planning, custom data loading and consultative data integration services such as multibasing across audio, video, out-of-home advertising and digital.

== Company history ==
=== Early days ===
In 1968, at age 29, Stanley Federman left Young & Rubicam and founded Telmar.

=== History ===
Telmar was the first independent supplier of computerized media information services for the advertising industry in addition to working with consumer research and media audience data. Telmar offered computer analyses of media performance, costs, selection and scheduling.

Telmar’s clients entered data into an acoustic data coupler which allowed the data to then be transmitted to Telmar’s computers through phone lines using a Teletype.

In 1998, Telmar introduced the first PC-based media planning software in 1983 and launched the Web-based media planning system, e-Telmar. In 1983, Telmar was appointed IBM’s first Value Added Dealer for PC and made its systems on the IBM PC with MRI and Simmons data available for clients who bought the data from MRI and Simmons. Telmar filed a lawsuit to seek an injunction against MRI and Simmons to prevent the companies from offering their data via PC based systems and limiting Telmar's offering.

In 2004, Telmar acquired Peaktime, a TV planning and yield management system which expanded Telmar’s client base of advertisers, agencies and media from 25 to 30 countries. The system enabled users to track real-time performance of TV audience delivery in a graphic interface.

Telmar’s Outdoor Planning System debuted in 2005, replacing the widely used Telmar’s Outdoor Synergy tool. The new tool was designed to incorporate new research data including GPS and support the role of the Traffic Audit Bureau for Media Measurement.

Telmar released the MultiBasing tool in 2005 allowing users to combine separate databases into a single set of results.

In 2007 came the introduction of Telmar’s Web-based research tool Research Guru, which simplified the process of analyzing relevant media information for advertising agencies.

Telmar announced an alliance with Cuende Infometrics S.A., Spain’s leading Outdoor software engineers, in 2010 for the launch of TOPS 2.0, an improvement over the previously released TOPS 1.0 since it brought the formerly US-based tool worldwide.

Telmar Matterhorn ROI was released in 2011, a cross media planning tool developed as the result of collaboration with ROI research firm Marketing Evolution. Matterhorn incorporates data analyzing the effectiveness of marketing campaigns and changes in media plans on ROI.

In 2010, Telmar launched traffic counts, a system that keeps track of the number of message viewers of a particular advertiser through the combination of auto and pedestrian traffic counts with interviews. In 2011, Telmar integrated data from the Traffic Audit Bureau’s Out of Home Rating out-of-home media measurement system into Telmar’s media planning tools, granting media planners metrics for measuring the effectiveness of outdoor ad campaigns.

In 2012, Telmar started to supply broadband satellite communication for the fleet of the Essberger Group.

On October 10, 2019, Telmar was acquired by Liiv, a holding company, founded by James Ingram and Benoit Lagarde.

== See also ==
- Tech companies in the New York metropolitan area
