= Enterproid =

American software company

Divide (previously Enterproid)
- Industry: Enterprise mobility management
- Founded: 2010
- Founder: Andrew Toy (CEO); Alexander Trewby (COO); David Zhu (CTO)
- Headquarters: New York City
- Number of locations: London, Hong Kong
- Products: Divide dual-persona BYOD platform
- Website: www.divide.com

Enterproid is an enterprise mobility management software company that helps business customers manage employee-owned smartphones and tablets, a trend known as Bring Your Own Device (BYOD). Enterproid is best known for its dual-persona platform called Divide, which separates iOS and Android devices into two personas for work and play.

== Product ==
Divide provides a workspace container that encrypts business data and applications and keeps them separate from personal data on an employee's mobile device. Enterproid was one of the first companies to introduce a dual-persona approach for enterprise mobility management and BYOD. Separating a device into two personas allows companies to protect only the business apps and data without having to manage or restrict the personal use of the device Divide, which also includes a number of business apps for email, calendar and contacts, is available for both iOS and Android devices.

== History ==
Enterproid was founded in 2010 by former Morgan Stanley mobile security and IT executives. The founding team includes CEO Andrew Toy, COO Alexander Trewby and CTO David Zhu. The company, which debuted Divide at the Demo Spring 2011 conference, established a headquarters in New York with offices in London and Hong Kong.

On May 20, 2014, the company was acquired by Google. Following the acquisition, Divide became Android for Work.

== Funding ==
In October 2013, Enterproid rebranded as Divide and announced closing a $12M funding round led by Google Ventures. The company raised $25 million, including an $11 million series A round in June 2011 from Google Ventures, Qualcomm Ventures and Comcast Ventures. It raised a $2 million seed round from Genacast Ventures, NYC, High Peaks Venture Partners and BOLDstart Ventures in October 2010.

== Awards ==
Date	Award	Description
Feb. 2011	Qualcomm Venture QPrize	Grand Prize Winner
Jan. 2012	GSMA Global Mobile Awards	Nominated for best enterprise mobile service and most innovative mobile app
April 2012	Gartner Cool Vendor	Recognized as a top vendor in security: infrastructure protection
May 2012	Time Inc.'s 10 NYC Startups to Watch	Listed as one of the top New York startups

== See also ==
- Tech companies in the New York metropolitan area
