= Q-Sensei =

Q-Sensei Corp.
- Type: Private company
- Industry: Information technology Search-based applications Search technology
- Founded: 2007
- Headquarters: San Francisco, California, United States
- Key people: Ute Rother (co-founder and CEO); Wolfram Kerber (co-founder and SVP Software Development); Jason Simon (VP Product Development)
- Products: Q-Sensei Spark; Q-Sensei Fuse
- Website: www.qsensei.com

Q-Sensei is a privately owned software company developing search technology and search-based applications for searching through unstructured and structured data. They make searching through diverse types and sources of data faster, easier, and more powerful. They developed enterprise search applications and are developing analytic features.

Q-Sensei is based on multi-dimensional search, which combines full text with faceted search and content analysis to present data organized and correlated along multiple facets or "dimensions" (e.g. date, tag, author, source, language, content type, etc.). This lets the end user dive deeper into a search query on multiple fronts. The company is product-focused and develops nearly plug and play applications that companies can deploy mostly on their own. Previous projects included: a “next generation” enterprise search platform; an RSS feed aggregator and reader; and an online service for searching scholarly literature.

Q-Sensei was formed in 2007 through the merger of German-based social knowledge network Lalisio and the US search technology company, QUASM. The company is headquartered in San Francisco, CA. Its European office is in Erfurt, Germany.

Its name is derived from the Japanese word Sensei, meaning "master" or "mentor".

== Products/applications ==
- Q-Sensei Spark -- plug-ins that integrate enterprise search into existing business applications. Available for Atlassian Confluence and JIRA.
- Q-Sensei Fuse -- algorithm-driven search and index program wrapped in an easy-to-install service layer.

== Awards ==
- Initiative Mittelstand: "Spark: Best Of Solution 2014, Apps category" (PDF). & "Fuse: Best Of Solution 2014, IT-Service category" (PDF).
- "KMWorld "100 Companies That Matter in Knowledge Management" 2014". March 2014.
- "KMWorld "100 Companies That Matter in Knowledge Management" 2013". March 2013.
- Frost & Sullivan 2012 Global Enterprise Search Price Performance Value Award
- "KMWorld "Trend-Setting Products of 2012"". September 2012. (for Q-Sensei Enterprise)
- "2012 Innovationspreis IT, Wissensmanagement". (IT Innovations Award Winner, Knowledge Management category)
- "Frost & Sullivan 2011 North American Enterprise Search New Product Innovation Award".
- "2011 Innovative Business Analytics Companies Under $100M to Watch". Archived from the original on 2011-10-28.

== See also ==
- Tech companies in the New York metropolitan area
