= Jason Hsiao =

Jason Hsiao is the president and co-founder of Animoto, an online video creation service, and a former television producer. Hsiao graduated from Dartmouth College.

== Television career ==
Hsiao pursued a career in entertainment and produced television and live-event comedies. He was the creator and co-executive producer of Dirty Stinkin' Politics, a political comedy series for Comedy Central, which he developed with Eddie Feldman. He also produced Comedy Central's Showbiz Show with David Spade, and MTV2's sketch comedy show Stankervision and MTV's Viva La Bam. Jason worked with comedians Jimmy Fallon (2002 MTV VMA's), Chris Rock (2003 MTV VMA's), and Colin Quinn (Comedy Central's Tough Crowd).

At Tough Crowd, Jason produced segments for comics including Jerry Seinfeld, George Carlin, Dave Chappelle, Sarah Silverman, and Jon Stewart. He made his television debut in a sketch with Denis Leary playing his dream role as a beaten and tied-up Vietnamese villager. He was the creator and producer of New York's Sketch Fights, a live-event competition between TV comedy writers at Carolines Comedy Club. In 2003, Jason produced the stage comedy Matt & Ben which was featured at the HBO Aspen Comedy Festival and then toured across the United States in 12 cities. The play's 11-month Off-Broadway run in New York City was listed among the top five shows of 2003 by Time Magazine.

== Animoto ==
In 2006, Hsiao founded Animoto along with Steve Clifton, Tom Clifton and Brad Jefferson. He currently resides in Brooklyn, where he guides the company’s strategy, product development and innovation for online video creation service.
