= LGC Ltd =

British analytical company

Coordinates: 51°25′25″N 0°20′32″W

LGC Limited
- Type: Private limited company
- Industry: biotechnology industry
- Predecessor: Laboratory of the Government Chemist; origins in 1842
- Founded: February 1996
- Headquarters: Teddington, England
- Area served: Global
- Key people: Euan O'Sullivan (Chief Executive)
- Revenue: £156 million (2022)
- Operating income: £5 million (2022)
- Net income: (£22 million) (2022)
- Number of employees: 1,166 (2022)
- Parent: Consortium led by Cinven and Astorg
- Website: www.lgcgroup.com

LGC Group, formerly the Laboratory of the Government Chemist, is an international life sciences measurement and tools company. It provides the role and duties of the UK Government Chemist, a statutory adviser to the government. LGC also hosts the UK's National Measurement Laboratory (NML) for chemical and bio-measurement, which performs measurements for diagnostics, advanced therapeutics, safety and security, among others.

== UK Government Chemist ==
The Government Chemist is a person appointed with statutory duties prescribed in seven acts of Parliament, supported by the Laboratory of the Government Chemist. In addition, this person is an advisor to the government on relevant matters. Since 2023, both these functions have been funded by the Department for Science, Innovation and Technology, but LGC is a private company, and the Government Chemist is an employee of LGC. As of August 2023, this position is held by Dr Julian Braybrook.

== History ==
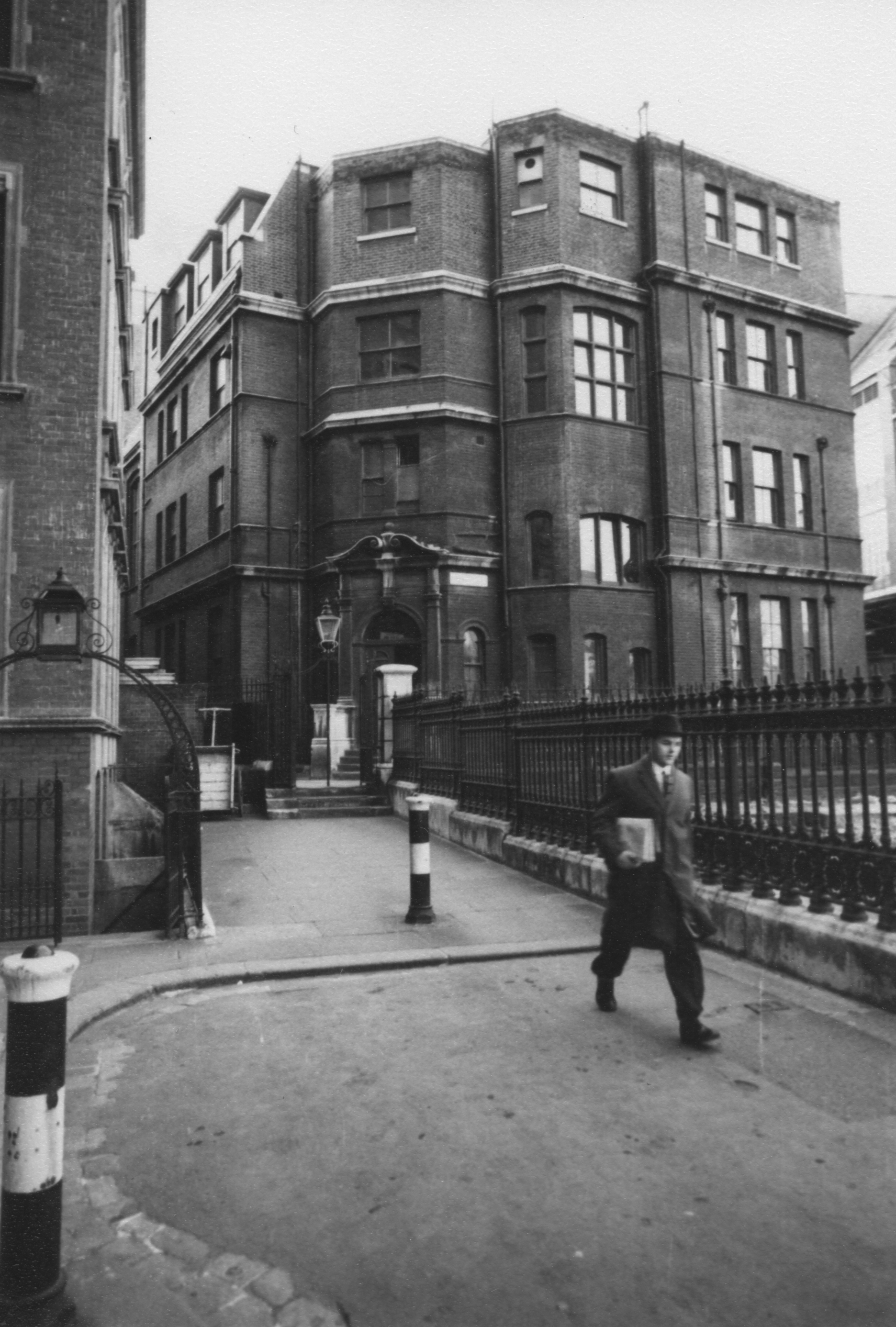
Clement's Inn Passage c1965

In 1842, the Department of Excise set up a laboratory in its Broad Street headquarters to check tobacco for adulteration, i.e. the addition of other substances to increase profits and evade duty, (the amount of tobacco sold was much greater than imported). One employee, George Phillips, used a microscope and chemical tests, most of which he had developed himself. The work of the laboratory expanded to check for adulteration in pepper, beer and coffee with additional staff being employed under Phillips, and a new laboratory was opened in Somerset House in 1859, by which time Excise had joined the Inland Revenue. In 1861, it dealt with 11,000 samples. The work also expanded to include foodstuffs and soap, and in 1874 Phillips had 12 permanent staff. The Inland Revenue Laboratory, as it was now known, was appointed a Referee Analyst under the Sale of Food and Drugs Act 1875 (38 & 39 Vict. c. 63), i.e. one whose findings were accepted in a court of law. This greatly added to the number of samples being submitted.

In 1894, an official Government Laboratory was set up, combining both the Inland Revenue Laboratory and a separate Customs Laboratory which had been set up in 1860, moving to purpose-built premises in Clement's Inn Passage in 1897. The head was Dr Edward Thorpe, with the title of Principal Chemist, who expanded its activities to include health problems caused by the match and lead-glazing industries. His report of 1907 states that 173,606 analyses and examinations were made on behalf of the departments of Customs & Excise, other departments, and in connection with two acts, the Food and Drugs Act and the Fertilisers and Feeding Stuffs Act.

=== First Government Chemist ===
In 1911, the Government Laboratory became an independent government department, the Department of the Government Chemist. The Principal, Dr James Dobbie, was the first to be given the new title of Government Chemist. The analysis of tobacco remained a substantial part of the work, being greatly increased during World War I because of supplies to troops. Demand increased with interwar legislation, and the Laboratory had to do considerable original research to develop new and better analysis methods. The number of routine samples between 1920 and 1939 went from 199,388 to 430,314. It was also asked by the government to look into methods associated with the carriage of dangerous goods, atmospheric pollution, and the possible dangers to health arising from the use of tetraethyllead in motor fuel. World War II produced a peak demand of 560 354 samples.

=== Creation of the Laboratory of the Government Chemist ===
In 1959, the Government Laboratory ceased to be a separate department but instead was brought under the Department of Scientific and Industrial Research. In 1963 it moved to new premises in Cornwall House, Waterloo, London as the Laboratory of the Government Chemist. In 1989 it was changed into an Executive Agency under the Department of Trade and Industry. This gave it the remit to seek outside work (which it already did to a significant extent) and earn income to fully cover costs, while having more management autonomy. It also moved to new premises in Teddington.

=== Privatisation ===
As part of a general programme of privatisation of public services by the government, Michael Heseltine announced that Laboratory of the Government Chemist would become an independent, non-profit company limited by guarantee, or could possibly be bought by a company or institution which could show that it would remain sufficiently independent to fulfil its statutory duties. However, the undertakings required to meet these obligations indefinitely meant that 40 initial expressions of interest produced only three considered suitable to bid, and no actual bids. A consortium of Laboratory employees, the Royal Society of Chemistry and 3i put together a bid in 1995, which was accepted, taking the form of a management buyout. It became LGC Ltd in February 1996.

=== Post privatisation ===
Since privatisation, LGC has changed ownership and significantly expanded its activities. Valued at £3 million when privatised, it was sold for £80 million in 2003 to LGV, part of Legal & General, who sold it in 2010 to Bridgepoint Capital for £257 million, who in turn sold it in 2015 to KKR. In 2020, KKR sold LGC to a consortium led by private equity companies Cinven and Astorg.

Employee numbers have risen from 270 in 1996 to about 4,350 in 2021, as the company has grown organically and through multiple acquisitions. Acquisitions since 1996 include:

- KBioscience
- AGOWA
- Forensic Alliance Limited
- Mikromol
- Promochem
- University Diagnostics Ltd
- HFL Sport Science (HFL)
- Analytical Reference Materials International (ARMI)
- VHG Labs
- Quotient Bioanalytical Sciences
- Dr. Ehrenstorfer
- Biosearch Technologies
- Thistle QA
- Maine Standards
- Prime Synthesis
- immunsuppressive Eignungstests (PT)-Programm von ASI
- BRC Global Standards
- o2si
- Seracare Life Sciences
- Lucigen
- Bioautomation
- Berry & Associates
- MBH Analytical
- Toronto Research Chemicals
- CDN Isotopes
- the Native Antigen Company
- Safefood 360
- Technopath Clinical Diagnostics
- Paragon Scientific

Outsourced analytical services for BNG and Sentinel Performance Solutions

== See also ==
- ISO/IEC 17025
- Good Laboratory Practice (GLP)
- Good manufacturing practice (GMP)
- Reference values
