= 33Across =

Publisher monetization company

- Founded: 2007
- Founder: Eric Wheeler
- Headquarters: Remote
- Website: 33across.com

33Across is an American digital advertising company based in Sunnyvale, California that offers monetization services for online publishers.

== History ==
33Across was founded in 2008 by Eric Wheeler. In 2011, Flybridge Capital Partners led a Series B round that supported the acquisition of Tynt, a San Francisco–based sharing technology.

== See also ==
- PeakBiety Branding + Advertising
