= Animoto =

Cloud-based video creation service

- Screenshot of online Animoto video editor
- Type: Private
- Industry: Photo Slideshow Software
- Founded: August 2006
- Founders: Jason Hsiao, Brad Jefferson, Stevie Clifton, Tom Clifton
- Headquarters: New York City, U.S.
- Number of employees: 100 (2020)
- Website: animoto.com

Animoto is a cloud-based video creation service that produces video from photos, video clips, and music into video slideshows, and customized web-based presentations. Animoto is based in New York City with an office in San Francisco.

== History ==
Animoto was founded in August 2006 by Jason Hsiao, Brad Jefferson, Stevie Clifton and Tom Clifton because of the poor video quality found on the internet. Animoto’s patented Cinematic Artificial Intelligence technology allows users to turn photos, video clips and music into video slideshows. Animoto’s founders include former producers of ABC, MTV, VH1, Comedy Central and the Documentary Group.

Animoto launched a Facebook application during the 2008 SXSW Interactive Festival. The application experienced viral growth in April 2008. According to The New York Times, by mid-April, Animoto's Facebook application had nearly 750,000 people sign up in three days. At the peak, almost 25,000 people tried Animoto in a single hour. Animoto decided to use Amazon's cloud computing servers in order to meet the growing number of subscribers. The surge of its growth required it to increase its previous IT infrastructure 100-fold. The use of cloud services allowed it to cope with the uptick in demand but also scale back services easily and cost-efficiently when demand slackened. In June 2009, the Animoto launched an iPhone app, allowing users to create video using pictures on their mobile phone.

By January 2013, the company had reached 6 million users and received a patent for its Cinematic Artificial Intelligence technology. In July 2018, the company was hacked, leading to unauthorized access of Animoto user personal information.

Previous logo

In 2020, Animoto released its social media insights in a report, consisting of an online survey of 1000 consumers and 500 marketers who are producing videos. Animoto has partnerships with social media platforms like Facebook, Instagram, YouTube, Twitter and LinkedIn.

== Products ==
It is considered one of the scalable web applications that were developed from the early phases of cloud computing by companies with limited IT infrastructure. It is available in both online and mobile platforms and offers both free and paid upgraded accounts.

== Awards ==
In 2009 Animoto received the Webby Award as Best Web Service & Application of the year.

== See also ==
- Tech companies in the New York metropolitan arena
