= PeakBiety Branding + Advertising =

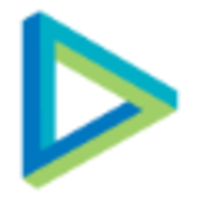
- Company type: Private
- Industry: Branding, Marketing, Advertising
- Founded: Tampa, Florida, USA (1990)
- Founder: Glen Peak and Mike Biety
- Headquarters: Tampa, United States
- Area served: Worldwide
- Website: www.peakbiety.com

PeakBiety Branding + Advertising is an advertising agency focusing on brand perception. The headquarters are located in Tampa, Florida and the agency serves a variety of sectors including healthcare, technology, financial services, manufacturing and professional services.

== History ==
The company was founded on March 1st, 1990, by Glen Peak and Mike Biety. They then applied to join American Association of Advertising Agencies (4As). That same year they received collateral-only assignments from Nokia (U.S.), which was then based in Largo, Florida and went on to develop the first U.S. network cable TV campaign. Over the next two years they also worked with "Florida Interchange Group", better known as the "Honor EFT" system, to build the concept of debit transactions, with Kawasumi Labs, a medical device company. In 1992, PeakBiety became a full-fledged member of the 4A's after a 2-year wait.

In March, 1997 Donette Arcos joined the team as promotions specialist and would later become media director. In the late 1990s and early 2000s, PeakBiety projects included work with the H. Lee Moffitt Cancer Center and Research Institute, pro-bono work for American Cancer Society for their development of Hope Lodge on the University of South Florida Campus, and collaboration with Nokia Latin America conduct a Shakira Tour. In 2001 they acquired their first software company assignment with HTE (now SunGard) and in 2003 they began work with Tampa Electric Company (TECO) to promote adoption of energy conservation programs.

The late 2000s and early 2010s saw several new hires and role changes. In 2005 Amy Phillips joined PeakBiety as associate creative director and eventually became creative director. In 2006, original partner, Mike Biety retired. In 2009 the agency moved offices to downtown Tampa and hired Kathryn Clark as art director. In 2013, David Alonso joined the creative team as an art director. In 2018, James Greenwood joined the creative team as an art director.

== Awards ==
- 2006 - National ADDY Awards for Moffitt Cancer Center; Gold District ADDY Awards; 17 ADDY Awards from the Tampa Bay Advertising Federation
- 2008 - 1 Gold and 8 Silver ADDY Awards from the Tampa Bay Advertising Federation
- 2009 - Gold District ADDY Awards for interactive campaign created for the Cancer Research Alliance; 4 Silver ADDY Awards from the Tampa Bay Advertising Federation
