= Moven =

- Industry: Fintech
- Founded: 2011
- Founder: Brett King, Alex Sion
- Headquarters: United States
- Products: Integrated PFM; BaaS; Companion Apps

Movencorp Newco Inc. also referred to as Moven, is a New York City-based fintech company working with banks, credit unions and other fintechs. The company specializes in consumer spending analytics.

Moven technology is integrated into financial applications to provide alerts and suggestions on spending habits. Moven is commonly used to monitor month to month spending habits, such as in TD Bank's MySpend mobile app or Westpac's CashNav mobile app.

== History ==
Moven was co-founded in 2011 by Brett King, author of the Bank 2.0, Bank 3.0 and Bank 4.0 books and others.

In August 2012, Moven announced that it had closed a $2.4 million seed investment round, funded by Moven's founders, Anthemis Group, Raptor Ventures, Kevin Plank (CEO of Under Armour), and a syndicate of Singaporean investors. In 2013, a fintech VC fund Life.SREDA invested $2 million in the Movenbank. Also in 2013, Moven launched its mobile banking and mobile payment services.

In 2020, Moven closed its Neobank operations to refocus its efforts on white label B2B efforts with financial institutions and fintechs. The company continues to operate as a digital banking and financial technology application developer, providing financial institutions and fintechs with APIs and SDKs.

in 2021 a new management team was formed with Richard Radice transitioning to CEO and fintech veteran Bryan Clagett, joining as CRO.

== Media coverage ==
Moven has been featured in American Banker, BetaKit, BRW, and PSFK.

Brett King also hosts the #1 Fintech radio show and podcast Breaking Banks.
