= Chitra Raghavan =

Clinical psychologist

- Occupation: Professor of Psychology

Academic background
- Education: Yale University School of Medicine University of Illinois at Urbana-Champaign (Ph.D.) Smith College (B.A.) Université Paris

Academic work
- Institutions: John Jay College of Criminal Justice
- Website: https://www.craghavan.com/

Chitra Raghavan is a clinical psychologist in New York City, specializing in domestic violence, sex trafficking, sexual harassment, rape, and other types of violent acts against humans. Raghavan focuses her research on both the tactics used by the perpetrators and the traumatic outcomes it causes the survivors.

Raghavan is a tenured professor of psychology at John Jay College of Criminal Justice and the CUNY Graduate Center. She has served as Director of the Forensic Mental Health Counseling Program and Coordinator of Victimology Studies in Forensic Psychology at John Jay. She believes research should only be conducted if it has value that leads to activism, change, and or improves the lives of others. She shares this belief to help her students conduct research that has positive real world application. Her own advances in advocacy and human rights and human trafficking research earned her the title of "New York's New Abolitionists" in 2014 by the New York State Anti-Trafficking Coalition.

== Education ==
Raghavan received her BA in French Language and Literature and Psychology from Smith College in 1992. She attended graduate school at University of Illinois at Urbana-Champaign where she obtained her MA (1995) and PhD (1998) in Clinical and Community Psychology and Quantitative Methods and Personality/Social Ecology. From there she complete a post-doctoral fellowship at Yale University School of Medicine, Department of Psychiatry from 1998–1999.

== Career ==
After completing her Ph.D., Raghavan became a research associate at the National Center on Addiction and Substance Abuse at Columbia University in 2001. Since then she has worked at the John Jay College of Criminal Justice. In 2005, she took the Professional Practice in Psychology (EPPP) examination and received her clinical licensure. She received tenure in 2007 as a Professor of Psychology. She was appointed Director of the Forensic Mental Health Counseling Program and Coordinator of Victimology Studies in Forensic Psychology. Raghavan's teaching focuses on the psychological analysis of criminal behavior, trauma, and violence, often with an emphasis on gender and multicultural issues.

== Research ==
Her research examines how coercion, manipulation, and psychological abuse contribute to intimate partner violence. She studies psychological tactics used by perpetrators to control their partners such as intimidation, degradation, microregulation, and threats, as well as their impact on survivors. More specifically she investigates how coercion operates across gay and heterosexual populations with a focus on Brazilian, Spaniard, and Moroccan cultures. This work emphasizes how cultural expectations around gender roles and relationship dynamics can exacerbate vulnerabilities to abuse, especially in marginalized communities. She has also researched trauma bonding, which has shed light on why victims struggle to leave abusive relationships, even when experiencing intense harm.

Additionally Raghavan has studied the psychological methods traffickers use to exploit and control their victims. This includes grooming, manipulation, threats, and violence. Her research demonstrates how traffickers employ strategies such as false promises, debt bondage, and emotional manipulation to entrap victims. Common trauma responses like dissociation, learned helplessness, and PTSD, are also explore in her research.

== Books ==
- Raghavan, C. and Cohen, S.J. (Eds.) (2013). Domestic Violence: Methodologies in Dialogue. Northeastern Series on Gender, Crime, and Law. Northeastern University Press.
- Raghavan, C. and Levine, J. (Eds.). (2012). Self-Determination and Women’s Rights in the Muslim World. HBI Series on Gender, Culture Religion, and Law. Brandeis University Press.
