= AdMarketplace =

Search advertising marketplace

adMarketplace, Inc
- Company type: Privately held
- Founded: 2000, New York City, NY
- Headquarters: New York City, New York, U.S.
- Area served: Worldwide
- Founder: Jamie Hill
- Key people: Jamie Hill (Founder, Chairman, Co-CEO); Adam J. Epstein (Co-CEO, President)
- Industry: Digital advertising, advertising technology
- Services: Custom Search Media Integrations for Publishers, Performance Media and Measurement for Advertisers
- Employees: 198
- Website: admarketplace.com
- Launched: 2000
- Current status: Active

== adMarketplace ==
adMarketplace, Inc. is a privately held advertising technology company headquartered in New York City. It operates as an independent third-party marketplace that places brand advertisements on publisher platforms in native ad formats, designed to be relevant to users and non-disruptive to the browsing or shopping journey. The company works with Fortune 500 brands and places ads on major publisher partners across browsers, Buy Now Pay Later apps, AI platforms, and content websites. Since 2025, adMarketplace has extended its business into monetizing AI chat and conversational search surfaces.

== History ==
Founding and Early Growth (2000–2016)

adMarketplace was founded by Jamie Hill in 2000. From 2003 to 2006, the company served as the exclusive search advertising platform for eBay, after which adMarketplace opened its platform to other advertisers and publishers.

By 2012, adMarketplace had grown to about 100 employees and was ranked the eighth-fastest-growing company in New York by Crain's New York Business. In early 2014, adMarketplace introduced BidSmart, an algorithmic bidding tool for its advertising platform, which received a Best Practices Award from the Data Warehousing Institute and a Discover Award from Hewlett-Packard that same year. Deloitte also named adMarketplace to its Technology Fast 500 list of fastest-growing North American technology companies in 2014. In 2016, adMarketplace became one of the first 100 companies approved for the Trustworthy Accountability Group (TAG) registry, an industry anti-fraud initiative.

== Business Model ==
adMarketplace is an independent, third-party marketplace, allowing it to place ads across a broad range of platforms and match advertisers with inventory across those surfaces. Rather than interstitial or display-style formats, the company's placements are built to appear within the native design of each publisher's platform, a model the company says keeps ads relevant to what consumers are looking for and prevents ads from interrupting that shopping journey. This reflects the company's foundational belief that advertising only works when it earns consumer trust.

The company's pricing model has historically been cost-per-click (CPC), so advertisers pay only for actual clicks through to their site. adMarketplace states that it reaches more than 1 billion consumers annually across its global media network and drives over $6 billion in consumer spend.

== Expansion Into AI-Native Advertising (2025–2026) ==
In October 2025, adMarketplace launched an alpha program placing sponsored ads inside Aria, the AI assistant built into the Opera browser. The company and trade press described it as the first large-scale deployment of cost-per-click paid ads within an AI chat interface. Over roughly six months, the alpha reportedly surfaced more than two million sponsored placements across about 700,000 AI queries.

On April 28, 2026, adMarketplace announced the beta launch of AI Discover, expanding the program to additional publishers. The product is built on two proprietary technologies: a consumer intent extraction layer the company calls the Context & Intent Vector (CIV), which identifies commercial intent within a query, and an ad-matching engine called Arena, which matches that intent against an inventory the company says exceeds 200 million indexed product listings and ranks sponsored results in real time. adMarketplace has stated that AI Discover operates separately from the AI model’s underlying reasoning process, a distinction it has framed as important to maintaining user trust.

== Public Commentary on Search Antitrust Litigation ==
On August 5, 2024, Judge Amit Mehta ruled in United States v. Google LLC that Google had violated Section 2 of the Sherman Act by illegally maintaining a monopoly in two search-related markets. adMarketplace filed an amicus brief in the case, and in September 2024, published a memo proposing that Google be required to license, or "syndicate," its search results and advertising data to competitors as part of any remedy.

During the remedy phase of the case, Co-CEO Adam J. Epstein testified before Judge Mehta on April 28, 2025, arguing that a syndication and data-sharing remedy would restore competition and encourage innovation in search advertising. Epstein also discussed the case in trade and business press, including multiple appearances on Bloomberg and BBC, an episode of the Marketecture podcast, and AdExchanger's "Antitrust Soul Searching" episode.

On September 2, 2025, Judge Mehta issued a remedy ruling ordering Google to syndicate portions of its search data and restricting the company's ability to enter into exclusivity agreements. The court's final judgment, issued December 5, 2025, directed Google to begin sub-syndicating its search text ads feed in 2026.

== Leadership ==
adMarketplace is led by co-chief executive officers Jamie Hill and Adam J. Epstein. Hill founded the company in 2000 and serves as Chairman. Epstein joined adMarketplace in 2003 and was named President and Chief Operating Officer in 2006; in February 2024, he was named Co-CEO alongside Hill. Other key executives include John Nitti, Global Chief Business Officer, Sam Cox, Chief Product Officer, and Cindy Curry, Chief Finance Officer.
