= Brett King (businessman) =

American businessman

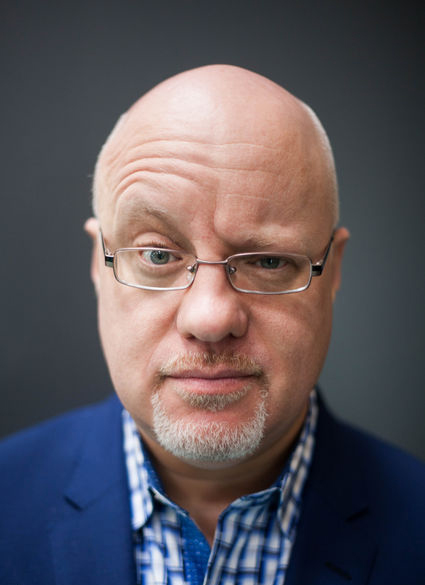
- Born: Melbourne, Australia; April 24, 1968 (age 58)
- Education: Monash University
- Occupations: Futurist and author

Brett King (born 24 April 1968 in Melbourne, Australia) is an Australian futurist, author, and co-founder of Moven, originally a New York City-based mobile banking startup. He is regarded as an influencer in financial services globally, and Augmented, his book about artificial intelligence, was recommended by Xi Jinping. His book Bank 4.0 was awarded Top Book by a Foreign Author in Russia for the year 2019, as judged by an independent panel audited by PricewaterhouseCoopers. He was inducted into the Fintech Hall of Fame in 2020 for his contribution to the industry.

== Education ==
King studied at Monash University, and taught the MBA program for the Australian Graduate School of Management in Hong Kong.

== Other work ==
In addition to writing for the BBC, King guest blogged for Huffington Post. He has also appeared as an industry commentator on cable and network news, and hosts a radio show "Breaking Banks" on VoiceAmerica, with about nine million monthly listeners and with WVNJ 1160 in New York.

== Moven ==
In 2011 King co-founded Moven (formerly Movenbank) app that provides real-time updates for debit card purchases. The company raised an initial $2.4m of seed money in 2012 and released the Beta version in February 2013. The app was named "Best in Show" at Finovate 2013 in London and raised a Series A investment round of $8m for product development and international expansion in July 2014. The company is headquartered in New York City and has partnered with banks, including TD Bank, in its app's operation. In 2012, King was named "Bank Technology News Innovator of the Year" by American Banker.

== Books ==
- Bank 2.0 (2010) mapped technological innovations being used by banks to better use things like social media, mobile devices, and business intelligence while pointing out that the world's banks were adapting at a relatively slow pace as compared to the evolution of the technologies involved. Information Age wrote of the work that "King's overall argument is that the credit crunch and ensuing recession have intensified the need for innovation in the financial services sector."
- Branch Today, Gone Tomorrow (2011) further discusses how banks are not innovating fast enough to stay relevant against their competitors. One of the key arguments King uses is that disruptive technologies change consumer behavior, which can lead consumers to leave their traditional institutions.
- BANK 3.0. Why Banking Is No Longer Somewhere You Go But Something You Do (2012) King has said that the difference between this work and Bank 2.0 was that the former work was an awareness-raising effort, and in Bank 3.0, King provides solutions to everyday banking problems—partially inspired by his app Moven. He also provides questions for banks to answer in terms of how they can regain their competitive edge.
- Breaking Banks: The Innovators, Rogues, and Strategists Rebooting Banking? (2014) named for his radio show, has the central premise that the banking system is broken and that banking innovators are fixing the system rather than breaking it down themselves. Jane Haskin of Banking Exchange wrote that "every banker should read this book" and that "After I read one of Brett King's books, I am always uneasy because it makes me realize how fast banking is changing."
- Augmented: Life in the Smart Lane (2016) describes how society will be impacted by technologies that will change the world more in the next 20 years than it has in the last 250 years. It topped the Top 10 non-fiction bestsellers in North America. In 2018, it was noted that Xi Jinping had Augmented on his bookshelf.
- Bank 4.0: Banking Everywhere, Never at a Bank (2018)
- The Rise of Technosocialism: How Inequality, AI and Climate Will Usher in a New World Order (2021), with Richard Petty
