= Safefood 360° =

Safefood 360, Inc.
- Type: Private
- Industry: Computer software
- Founded: Dublin, Ireland (2010)
- Founder: George Howlett & Philip Gillen
- Headquarters: Manhattan, New York, U.S.
- Area served: Worldwide
- Key people: George Howlett; (CEO); Philip Gillen; (COO)
- Products: Food Safety Management SaaS Software
- Services: Food Safety Management Consulting
- Number of employees: 23 (2017)
- Website: www.safefood360.com

Safefood 360°, Inc. is a food safety management software company founded in Dublin, Ireland, and now headquartered in Manhattan, New York, United States. The main products of Safefood 360°, Inc. is web-based food safety management system, which is used by food manufacturing businesses for managing food safety programs and supply chains.

== History ==
Safefood 360° was founded by former food industry-consultant George Howlett and Philip Gillen in 2011. The company operates globally on four continents, including Europe, North America, Australia, and Africa.

Safefood 360° was acquired by the LGC Group in 2020 and has become an integral part of LGC Assure, the umbrella brand comprising a quality assurance and safety standards across a range of industries, including BRCGS (a food quality and safety certification scheme), INFORMED (a sport-supplement compliance and quality assurance scheme), and SSAS (Sports and Specialised Analytical Services, a drug surveillance service).

== Integrated software platform ==
The main product of Safefood 360° is an integrated, web-based food safety and supplier management platform. Accessible through both a web browser and its mobile application, it offers a variety of specialized modules to aid in the handling of food-safety related tasks. These include the hazard analysis and critical control points (HACCP), auditing, cleaning, pest control, and over 35 other modules in total.

According to the company, Safefood 360°'s platform is built in accordance with prominent international food safety standards such as: BRCGS (Brand Reputation through Compliance Global Standard), Food Safety Modernization Act (US; FSMA), Global Food Safety Initiative (GFSI), ISO 22000, and Safe Quality Food (SQF). The stated aim of the product is promoting efficient food safety management and adherence to global standards, by streamlining food safety, traceability, and compliance tasks for users.

=== Software modules ===
Safety and quality processes

- HACCP, preventive control plans (PCPs) and food safety plans
- Cleaning
- Code of practice
- Contamination control
- Microbiological control
- Hazard database
- Maintenance
- Management review
- Medical screening
- Nonconformance
- Pest control
- Recall and withdrawal

Compliance and review processes

- Quality management
- Auditing
- Complaints
- Corrective action
- Calibration
- Glass and plastic control
- Monitoring
- Traceability
- Training
- Receiving
- Supplier management
- Supplier portal

Business management

- Business process
- Alerts
- Batching
- Categories
- Contacts
- Document control
- Discussions
- Employee database
- Items
- Products and materials
- Reports
- Tests

=== Software uses ===
The three main uses of Safefood 360° software are: food safety management, food supply chain management, and food safety auditing. A food safety management software is typically used to replace a paper-based system to increase the production efficiency.

== See also ==
- Codex Alimentarius – Collection of internationally recognized food standards relating to food, food production, food labeling, and food safety
- European Food Safety Authority
- Foodborne illness
- Food Standards Australia New Zealand (FSANZ)
- Food system
- List of food safety organisations
