= Integral Ad Science =

American publicly owned technology company

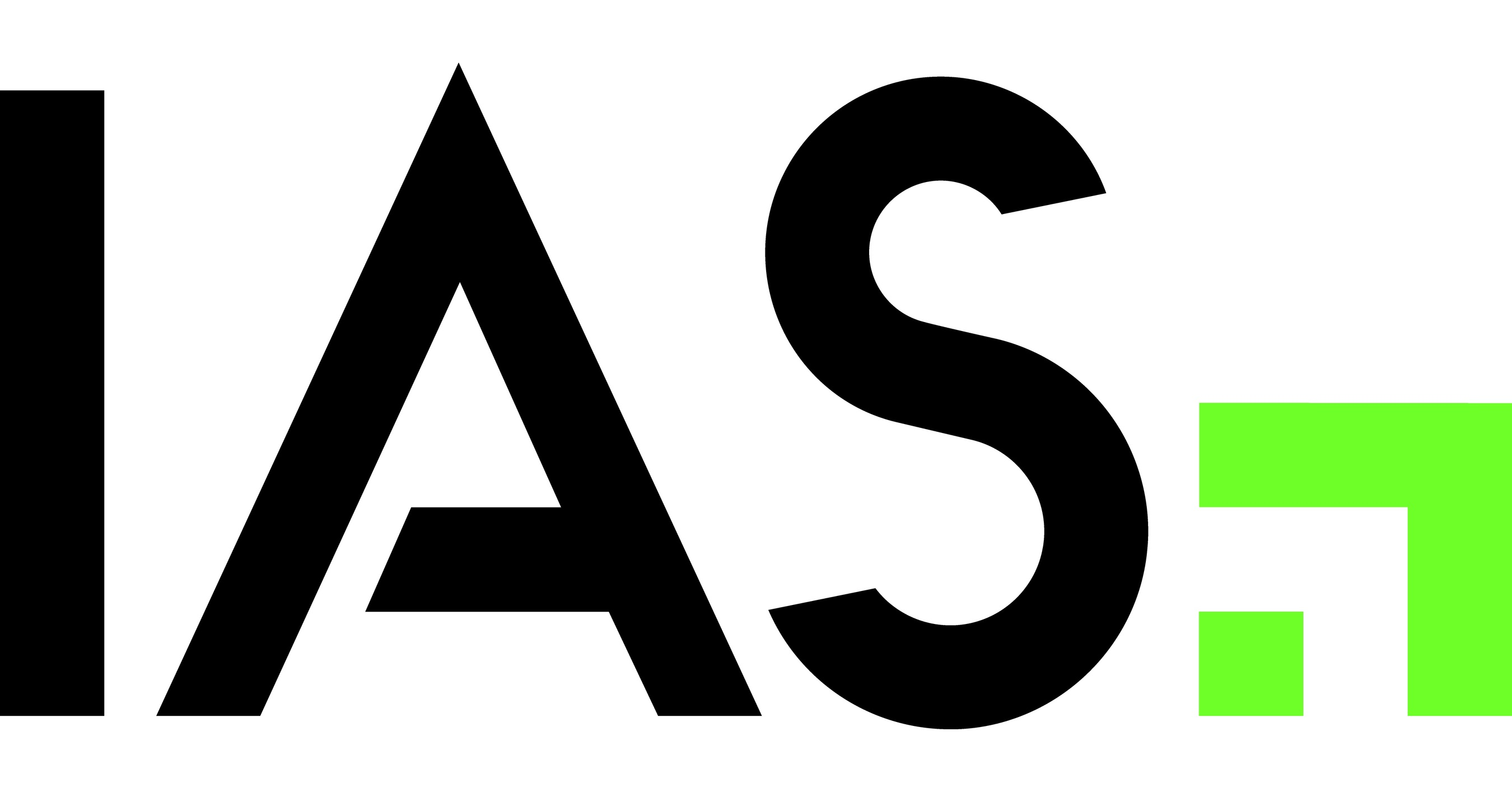
- Formerly: AdSafe Media
- Type: Public
- Traded as: Nasdaq: IAS
- Industry: Ad technology
- Founded: 2009; 17 years ago
- Founder: Will Luttrell; Helene Monat; Foster Provost; Bryan St. John; Josh Attenberg; Kent Wakeford
- Headquarters: New York City, New York, United States
- Area served: Worldwide
- Key people: Lisa Utzschneider (CEO)
- Products: Marketer's Edge; Trader's Edge; Seller's Edge
- Revenue: $408M ($50M as of January 2015)
- Owner: NovaCap
- Website: integralads.com

Integral Ad Science (IAS) is an American publicly traded technology company that analyzes the value of digital advertising placements. Based in New York City, it has locations in Chicago, San Francisco, Berlin, London, Paris, Melbourne, Singapore, Sydney, Tokyo and Pune.

It is known for addressing issues around fraud, viewability and brand risk, as well as TRAQ, a proprietary media quality score. In addition to evaluating the quality of online ad placements between media buyers and sellers, it creates products for agencies and marketers, programmatic players and media sellers.

IAS is a member of the Interactive Advertising Bureau and works with the "Brand Integrity Program Against Piracy" initiative by the Trustworthy Accountability Group.

== History ==
The company was founded by Will Luttrell, Helene Monat, Foster Provost, Bryan St. John, Josh Attenberg and Kent Wakeford in 2009, with initial investment from Coriolis Ventures.

Initially known as an ad verification company called AdSafe Media, it secured over $7 million in Series B funding led by Accomplice a year after its founding. In 2012, it raised an additional $10 million in funding from Pelion Venture Partners, Accomplice and Coriolis Ventures.

In 2013, a year after being rebranded as Integral Ad Science and becoming a media valuation firm, it was recognized by Crain's New York Business as one of the Best Places to Work. In January 2014, its ad verification technology was accredited by the Media Rating Council.

After raising $30 million in a Series D funding round led by August Capital, IAS has raised over $47 million in total funding. In February 2014, a month before announcing international offices in Germany and Singapore, it acquired Simplytics, a UK-based mobile advertising analytics company.

In September 2014, IAS announced Causal Impact, a ROI measurement tool for online advertising. Recognized on Crain's 2014 Fast 50 and Best Places to Work, Integral was named by Forbes as one of America's Most Promising Companies of 2014, as well as being ranked on the 2014 Inc. 5000 list.

In early 2015, in addition to announcing its expansion to Sydney, Australia, it had its video ad viewability technology was accredited by the Media Rating Council. In February, a month before acquiring Veenome, a DC-based video advertising analytics company, IAS opened its Anti-Fraud Lab for research and development of fraud detection and prevention in Seattle, Washington.

In July 2016, Integral acquired Swarm Enterprises, a San Francisco-based bot detection company to bolster their advertising fraud detection product. When its former CEO Scott Knoll moved to an advisory role, Lisa Utzschneider was hired to fill the position at IAS.

In June 2021, the firm held an initial public offering of stock and began trading on the Nasdaq exchange under the ticker symbol IAS. In August, IAS acquired the CTV ad server platform Publica for $220M.

On November 23, 2025, it was reported that the private equity firm NovaCap had completed the purchase of IAS, valued at $1.9 billion.

== TRAQ ==
TRue Advertising Quality, also known as TRAQ, is an ad quality scoring system created by Integral Ad Science. The system gives scores from 250 to 1,000, which buyers and sellers use to value media by assessing metrics including brand safety, ad fraud, page content and structure, time viewed, share of view, and ad clutter.

== Partnerships ==
Integral is partnered with multiple buyers and sellers, including agency holding groups and DSP's. Integral is partnered with Nielsen, which uses Integral's viewability measurement. In August 2014, Integral partnered with TubeMogul for anti-fraud verification and viewability measurement. In January 2015, MediaMath partnered with IAS to use Integral's pre-bid targeting tool, Bid Expert. In June 2019, IAS announced it was partnering with Verizon and multiple connected TV (CTV) publishers, including NBC Universal and CBS Interactive, for a pilot verification program to tackle CTV ad fraud.
