= Mimeo, Inc =

Online publishing company

Mimeo.com, Inc.
- Type: Private
- Industry: Office services
- Founded: 1998
- Headquarters: 3350 MIAC Cove, Memphis, TN, United States
- Area served: Worldwide
- Key people: John Delbridge (CEO), David Uyttendaele (CTO)
- Products: Print on demand, Electronic publishing, digital distribution, Warehousing, Kitting Services
- Number of employees: 800 (2014)
- Subsidiaries: Mimeo LTD, Mimeo GmbH, SPC Verlag, Gateway Publishing
- Website: Mimeo Homepage

Mimeo.com, Inc. is a privately held Print on demand and digital distribution document company. It was the first to offer online printing and overnight delivery of complex documents and marketing materials. The company refers to itself as a technology company that prints. Customers utilize a proprietary online workflow connected to multiple print production, warehouse and distribution centers. Customers include small, mid-sized and large companies. The company was named after the Mimeograph. Printing and distribution centers are located in Memphis, Tennessee, Berlin, Germany and Huntingdon, Cambridgeshire, England.

== History ==
Mimeo was founded in 1998 by Key Compton, Jeff Stewart (Mimeo.com board member and first Mimeo.com chief executive officer) and Dave Meadows. A few months later, David Uyttendaele (Mimeo's Chief technology officer), Scott Klemm and John Delbridge (former Chief operating officer and Chief financial officer, current Mimeo CEO), joined the founding team. Stewart, Delbridge and Uyttendaele first met on the second floor of their freshman dormitory at Rensselaer Polytechnic Institute. They reunited in 1998 after Stewart and Uyttendaele launched and sold Internet consulting company Square Earth to Proxicom, which is now ICrossing. In 1998, the company launched with the goal of becoming the print dial tone for the Internet. The company developed proprietary technology and a proof of concept, leading to the release of a functional version in mid-1999. The first print facility was located next to the FedEx distribution hub in Memphis, Tennessee.

In 2000, the company reported employment levels of 80 people and 422 customers. Unfortunately, Mimeo was spending more than it was taking in, losing $1M per month. To accelerate growth the company hired an experienced sales professional, John F. Lyons as CEO in May 2001, replacing company founder Jeff Stewart. As of 2002, Customers included 300 of the Fortune 2000.

In October 2004, the company's growth was recognized by Inc. (magazine), as one of the fastest-growing companies in the U.S. having been ranked at number 186 on the Inc. 500. The CEO, John Lyons left the company at this time replaced by John Delbridge while a search for a full-time CEO was launched.

In 2005, Adam Slutsky, former COO, CFO and director of Moviefone joined the company as CEO, replacing John F. Lyons. In September 2006, the company purchased three Kodak Nexpress Color printers and reported a total of 328 employees. They also added add several key executives, including Tom Karrat, EVP Sales and Marketing, Charlie Corr, as VP Corporate Strategy and Coleen Smith as Chief People Officer. At the time, Mimeo reported growth rates of 50% over the past four years. The company achieved growth rates of 68% in 2005 versus 2004, reaching $50 million in total revenue.

In December 2008, Mimeo opened a 75,000-square-foot web-enabled print production and distribution facility in Newark, New Jersey, with a capacity of 1,000,000 pages per day. This was the second print and distribution facility owned by the company. By 2008 Mimeo employed more than 500 people, serving 4000 customers, 38% of which are Fortune 500 customers. From 2007 to early 2010, Mimeo.com saw steady growth and expansion with revenues growing from $39.6 million in 2006 to $60 million in 2009. In June 2018 the company announced it would close the facility.

In July 2011 Mimeo expanded into Europe with the acquisition of Cambridgeshire, England-based CLE, led by Jamie Wardley. Wardley was immediately appointed general manager of Mimeo Europe. The acquisition expanded Mimeo's business to include custom products such as school yearbooks via SPC Verlag and on-demand funeral cards via Gateway Funeral Cards. In Q4 2011, CLE moved into a new facility in Huntingdon, Cambridgeshire, England, that serves as the headquarters for Mimeo Europe as well Mimeo's first production and distribution centre in Europe.

In 2013, Mimeo had more than 600 employees and revenues of approximately $100 million. The Memphis facility has 324 people with plans to expand to 514 employees by 2016. The company hires approximately 200 temporary workers to meet holiday season demand for photo greeting cards, calendars and albums. In 2014, Mimeo expanded in Europe with an acquisition of Germany's Koebcke. With this acquisition, the employee count grew to over 800 employees.

In January 2013, John Delbridge took over as the CEO and president, following Adam Slutsky's departure. For the period 2005 to 2012 Mimeo reported an annualized growth rate of +25%.

In 2017, Mimeo launched MimeoPhotos, continuing its expertise from its former white-label relationships with Apple, Snapfish, and American Greetings. MimeoPhotos helps amateur and professional photographers turn photos into premium photo products you can touch, hold, or hang.

== Business ==
=== Products and Services ===
Products

Mimeo offers Print on-demand document printing, print distribution and digital document distribution. Customers can upload files in any format and then use online tools to select and view an online proof and select different binding and finishing options. The company website lists presentations, manuals, brochures, booklets, flyers, newsletters, and posters among the available products. Custom products include funeral cards, school planners, photo books, and bound documents.

Services

Mimeo Marketplace is a customized E-commerce storefront that launched in 2008 integrates with the solution for distribution of printed and digital documents. A product extension, Marketplace TCM was introduced at ASTD 2013 (American Society for Training & Development), as a digital and print and digital document management and distribution solution.

Services include Warehousing and Kitting where multiple items can be stored and then distributed into a kit for distribution. Items can be ordered as a kit through the Mimeo Marketplace or the Mimeo interface. Electronic publishing (called ePublishing) solutions enable document administrators to distribute content as a file, secured document and via an E-book reader.

=== Print Production Technology ===
Mimeo employs its proprietary Adaptive Document Assembly Process (ADAP) software to manage print operations across three digital printing facilities. It uses algorithms to dynamically schedule production and route jobs based on delivery requirements and the workloads on individual pieces of equipment and plants. The company operates Kodak NexPress and Hewlett-Packard Indigo and Xeikon digital color printers, installed across the facilities are a number of Océ and Xerox monochrome devices. For large-format digital printing, Hewlett-Packard DesignJet ink-jet printers drive production. Standard Horizon folding (AFC-544AKT), trimming (HT-30), saddle stitching (StitchLiner 5500) and perfect binding (BQ-270 and BQ-470) equipment is installed in the plants. Mimeo also uses Six Sigma and Lean manufacturing practices. Mimeo operates nine Quality assurance stations with 31 checkers.

=== Competitors ===
The company's competitors in North America include FedEx Office, Staples Inc., OfficeMax, Xerox and many local providers.

=== Clients ===
- Airgas
- Expedia
- gtslearning
- Hewlett-Packard
- Jenny Craig, Inc.
- SAP AG
- Siemens
- SunTrust Banks

== Corporate Affairs ==
=== Investors ===
The venture capital arm of Hewlett-Packard made the first $6 million investment in Mimeo.com. The Hewlett-Packard investment funded the lease for a 140,000 square foot facility in Memphis, Tennessee, across from the FedEx shipping hub in the Memphis International Airport Center. With Hewlett-Packard as an investor, Mimeo was able to interest other venture capitalists such as Draper Fisher Jurvetson and their New York City based affiliate, DFJ Gotham.

On February 9, 2000 Mimeo announced a $10 million joint investment leading to a total equity raise of $21 million. In the same year, Mimeo also raised a $12 million Series B round with investors including Draper Fisher Jurvetson, DFJ Gotham, Hewlett-Packard and several of the founders. In June 2002 Mimeo raised a $6.5M Series C round led by Draper Fisher Jurvetson with participation from Hewlett-Packard and DFJ Gotham. To fund expansion, Mimeo continued to raise money, including a 2004, $5.5M round of financing. The round was led by HarbourVest Partners and included follow on investments from Draper Fisher Jurvetson and DFJ Gotham.

In 2005, Mimeo raised an additional $5.8M in equity led by HarbourVest Partners, followed by Draper Fisher Jurvetson, DFJ Gotham Ventures and additional private investors. GE Commercial Finance Technology Lending provided $3.2 Million in debt financing. In 2007, the company raised an additional $25 million led by Goldman Sachs Principal Strategies Group. Other investors included Draper Fisher Jurvetson, DFJ Gotham Ventures, Harbourvest Partners and Hewlett-Packard.

In 2011, Mimeo raised growth capital through an equity and subordinated debt investment from Patriot Capital.

=== Board Members ===
- John Delbridge, CEO Mimeo.com
- Ross H. Goldstein, DFJ Gotham Ventures
- Peter B. Lipson, Harbourvest Partners, LLC

=== Former Board Members and Board Observers ===
- Jeff Stewart, former Board member, founder Lenddo
- David Uyttendaele, CTO, Board Observer
- Key Compton, Board Observer, President, Data & Distribution, AddThis
- Janet Morrison Clarke, former Board member Asbury Automotive Group

=== Awards and Industry Ranking ===
50th Largest Printing Company in the United States (as of 2012, based on company reported $100M gross revenue) Inc. (magazine) 500/5000 Ranking: (9 Listings)

Year	Rank
2004	186
2005	277
2007	1320
2008	1486
2009	2293
2010	3456
2011	4419
2012	4094
2013	4646

Printing Industries of America “Best in Show” Web2Awards 4 consecutive years (2009, 2010, 2011, 2012) Questex Media Award for Business Transformation Initiatives TrainingOutsourcing.com Top 20 Specialized Learning Process Providers (2006) Crain's New York Business Fast 50 2012

== See also ==
Print on demand

Digital printing

Self-publishing
