= Takero Okajima =

Japanese baseball player (born 1989)

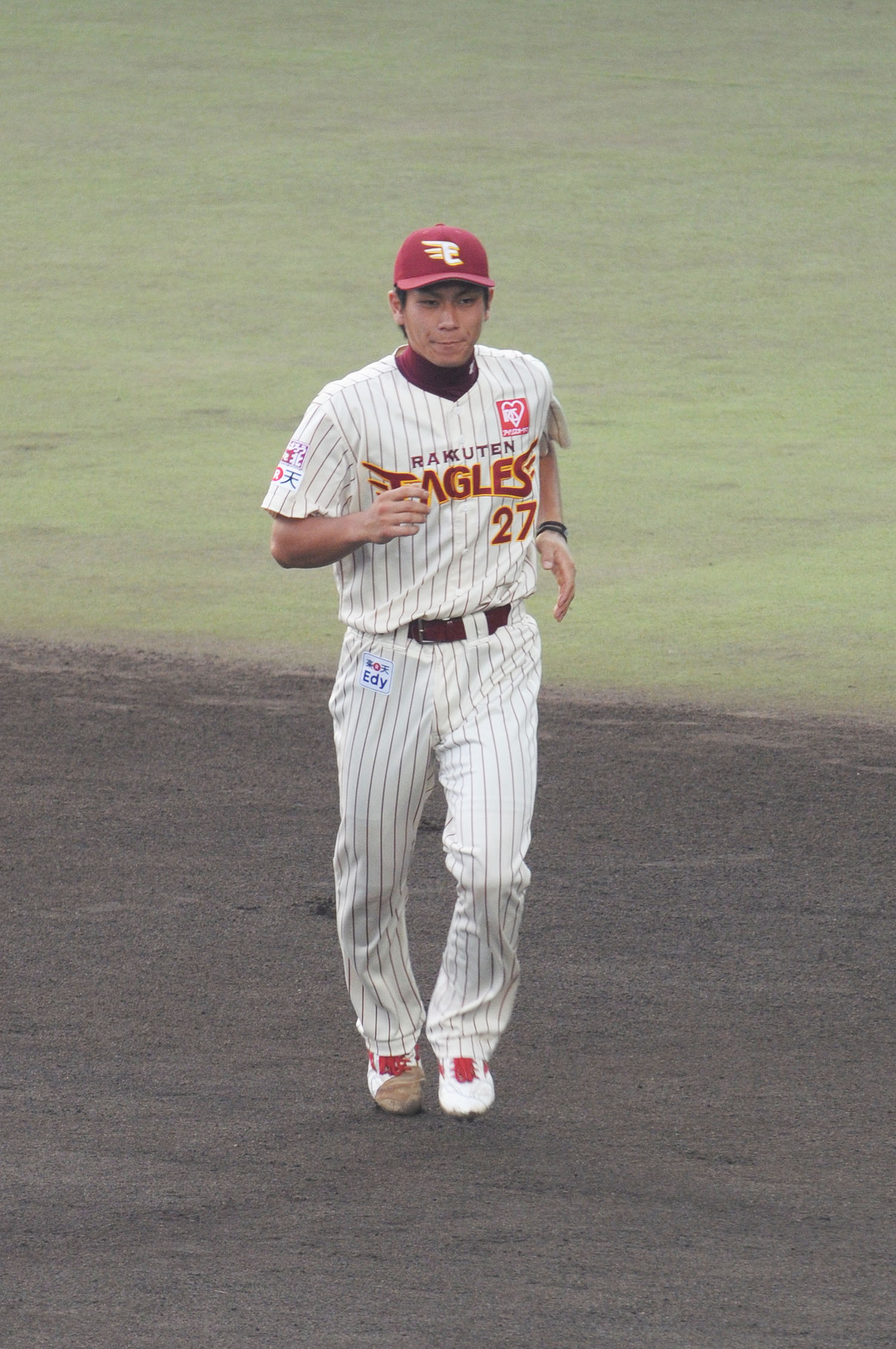
- Okajima with the Tohoku Rakuten Golden Eagles

Tohoku Rakuten Golden Eagles – No. 27
- Catcher / Outfielder
- Born: September 7, 1989 (age 36)
- Bats: Left Throws: Right

NPB debut
- June 20, 2012, for the Tohoku Rakuten Golden Eagles

Career statistics (through 2023 season)
- Batting average: .258
- Hits: 796
- Home runs: 40
- Runs batted in: 305
- Stolen base: 41
- Stats at Baseball Reference

Teams
- Tohoku Rakuten Golden Eagles (2012–present)

Career highlights and awards
- 1× Japan Series champion (2013)

Takero Okajima (岡島 豪郎, Okajima Takerō; born September 7, 1989, in Ōra District, Gunma) is a Japanese professional catcher for the Tohoku Rakuten Golden Eagles of Nippon Professional Baseball.
