= Kazuya Fujita =

Japanese baseball player (born 1982)

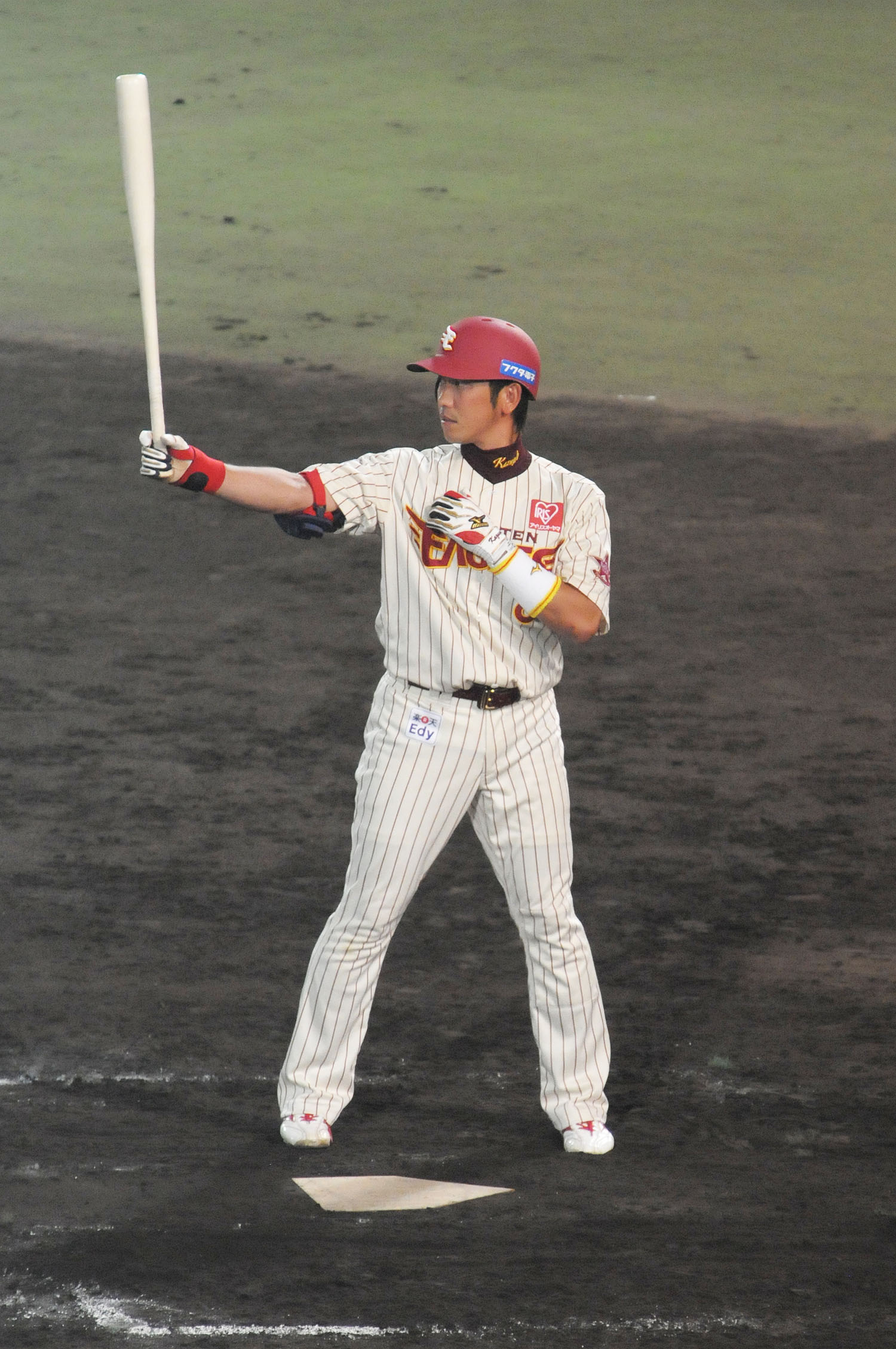
- Fujita with the Tohoku Rakuten Golden Eagles

Yokohama DeNA BayStars – No. 73
- Second baseman / Coach
- Born: July 3, 1982 (age 44)
- Batted: Left Threw: Right

NPB debut
- July 27, 2005, for the Yokohama BayStars

Last NPB appearance
- October 4, 2023, for the Yokohama DeNA BayStars

NPB statistics
- Batting average: .268
- Hits: 1,034
- Home runs: 24
- RBI: 327
- Stolen Bases: 37
- Stats at Baseball Reference

Teams
- As player: Yokohama BayStars/Yokohama DeNA BayStars (2005–2012); Tohoku Rakuten Golden Eagles (2012–2021); Yokohama DeNA BayStars (2022–2023); As coach: Yokohama DeNA BayStars (2024–present)

Career highlights and awards
- 2× Pacific League Best Nine Award (2013, 2014); 3× Pacific League Golden Glove Award (2013, 2014, 2016); 1× Japan Series champion (2013)

Kazuya Fujita (藤田 一也, born July 3, 1982) is a Japanese former professional baseball player. He previously played in Japan's Nippon Professional Baseball with the Tohoku Rakuten Golden Eagles and the Yokohama DeNA BayStars.
