= Tomio Tashiro =

Japanese baseball player (born 1954)

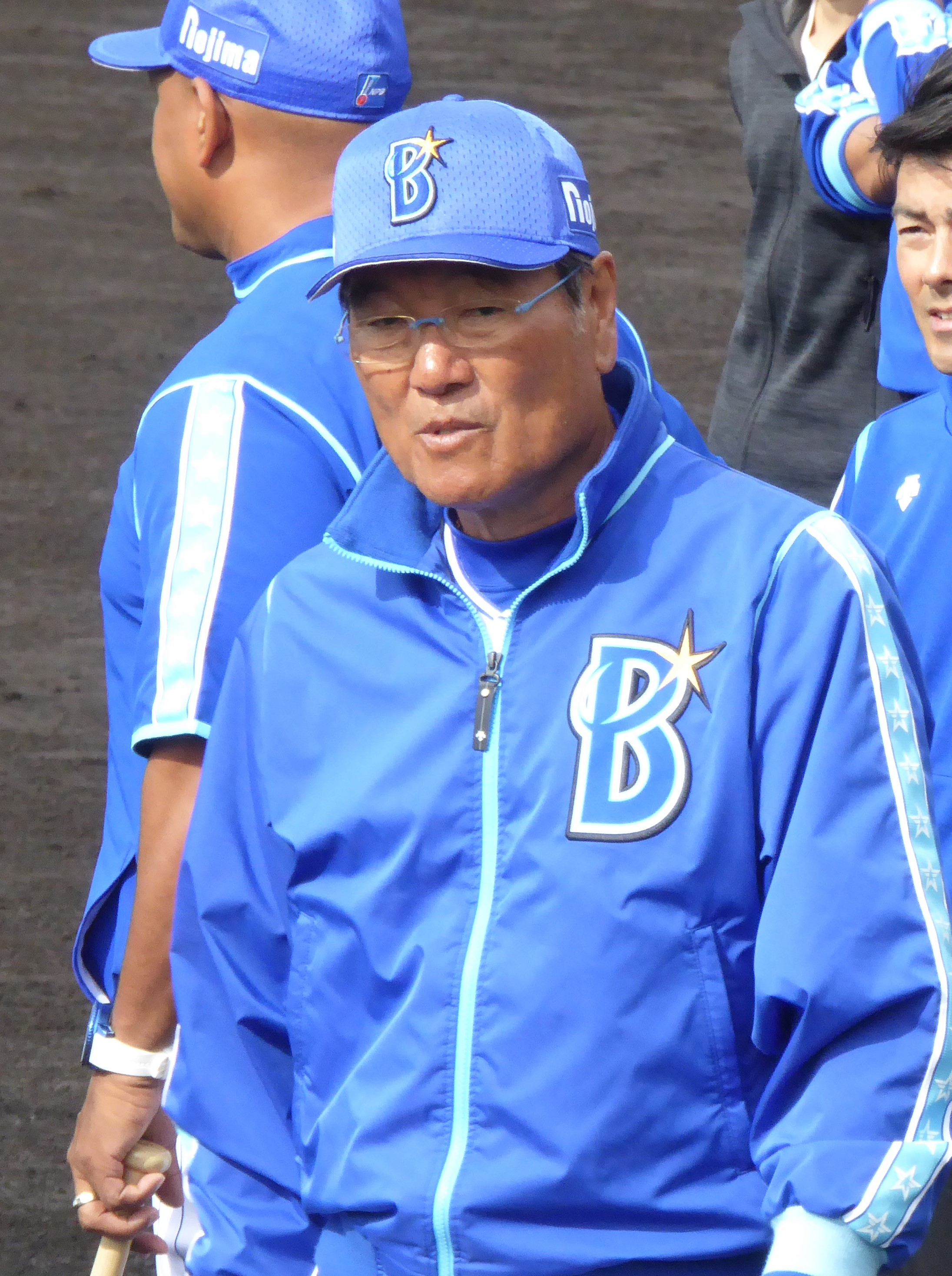
- Tashiro in 2019

Yokohama DeNA BayStars – No. 76
- Infielder / Coach
- Born: July 9, 1954 (age 71); Odawara, Kanagawa, Japan
- Batted: Right Threw: Right

debut
- May 4, 1976, for the Taiyō Whales

Last appearance
- October 10, 1991, for the Yokohama Taiyō Whales

Career statistics
- Batting average: .266
- Home runs: 278
- Hits: 1321
- Stats at Baseball Reference

Teams
- As player: Taiyō Whales/Yokohama Taiyō Whales (1973–1991); As coach: Yokohama BayStars (1997–2010); SK Wyverns (2011); Tohoku Rakuten Golden Eagles (2012–2015); Yomiuri Giants (2016–2018); Yokohama DeNA BayStars (2019–)

Career highlights and awards
- Japan Series champion (2013)

Tomio Tashiro (田代 富雄, Tashiro Tomio; born July 9, 1954 in Odawara, Kanagawa) is a Japanese former Nippon Professional Baseball player and coach who is currently a hitting coach for Yokohama DeNA BayStars of Nippon Professional Baseball (NPB).
