= Manabu Mima =

Japanese baseball player (born 1986)

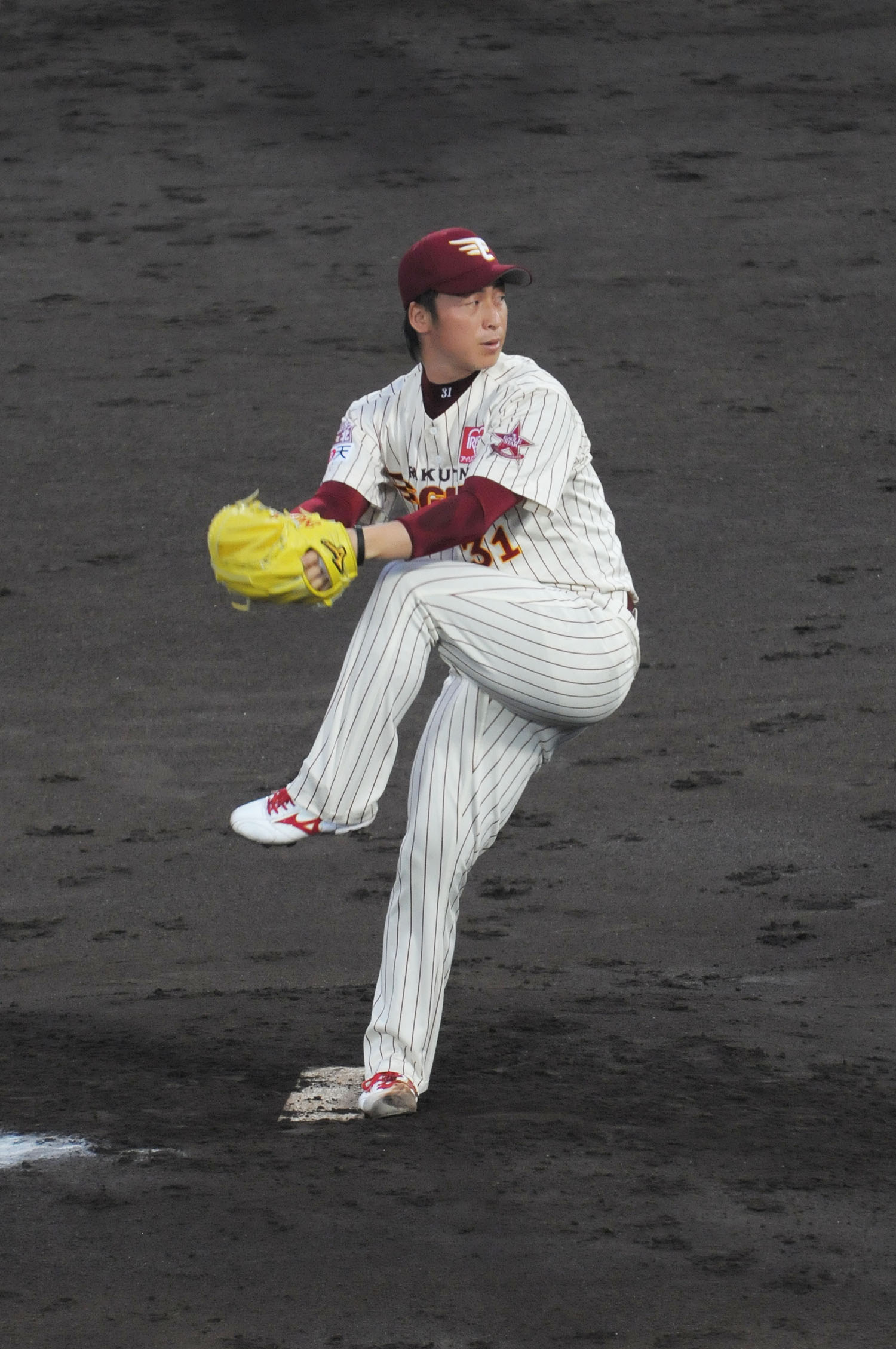
- Mima with the Tohoku Rakuten Golden Eagles

Chiba Lotte Marines – No. 81
- Pitcher / Coach
- Born: September 19, 1986 (age 39); Kitasōma District, Ibaraki, Japan
- Batted: Left Threw: Right

NPB debut
- April 13, 2011, for the Tohoku Rakuten Golden Eagles

Last NPB appearance
- September 30, 2025, for the Chiba Lotte Marines

NPB statistics
- Win–loss: 80–88
- Earned run average: 3.94
- Strikeouts: 1,042
- Stats at Baseball Reference

Teams
- As player: Tohoku Rakuten Golden Eagles (2011–2019); Chiba Lotte Marines (2020–2025); AS coach: Chiba Lotte Marines (2026-present)

Career highlights and awards
- Japan Series champion (2013); Japan Series Most Valuable Player Award (2013); NPB All-Star (2019)

Manabu Mima (美馬 学, born September 19, 1986) is a Japanese former professional baseball pitcher. He played in Nippon Professional Baseball (NPB) for the Tohoku Rakuten Golden Eagles and Chiba Lotte Marines from 2011 to 2025.

== Career ==
Mima attended Fujishiro High School and Chuo University. Mima pitched for Tokyo Gas in the industrial leagues after college. The Rakuten Golden Eagles chose him in the second round of the 2010 NPB draft. He then joined the Japanese national baseball team for the 2010 Asian Games. Mima's repertoire includes a slider, forkball, curveball, shuuto (two-seamer), and a fastball (tops out at 95 mph). He debuted on April 13, 2011, tossing a scoreless 8th to preserve a 5–1 lead over the Chiba Lotte Marines.

In the 2013 season, Mima had a 6–5 win–loss record and a 4.12 earned run average. Mima was the winning pitcher in Games 3 and 7 of the 2013 Japan Series, and was named the Japan Series Most Valuable Player (MVP).

On November 25, 2019, Mima signed with the Chiba Lotte Marines.

On September 9, 2025, Mima announced that he would be retiring following the conclusion of the season.

== Personal life ==
His wife is Japanese singer Anna.
