= Akihisa Makida =

Japanese baseball player and coach (born 1982)

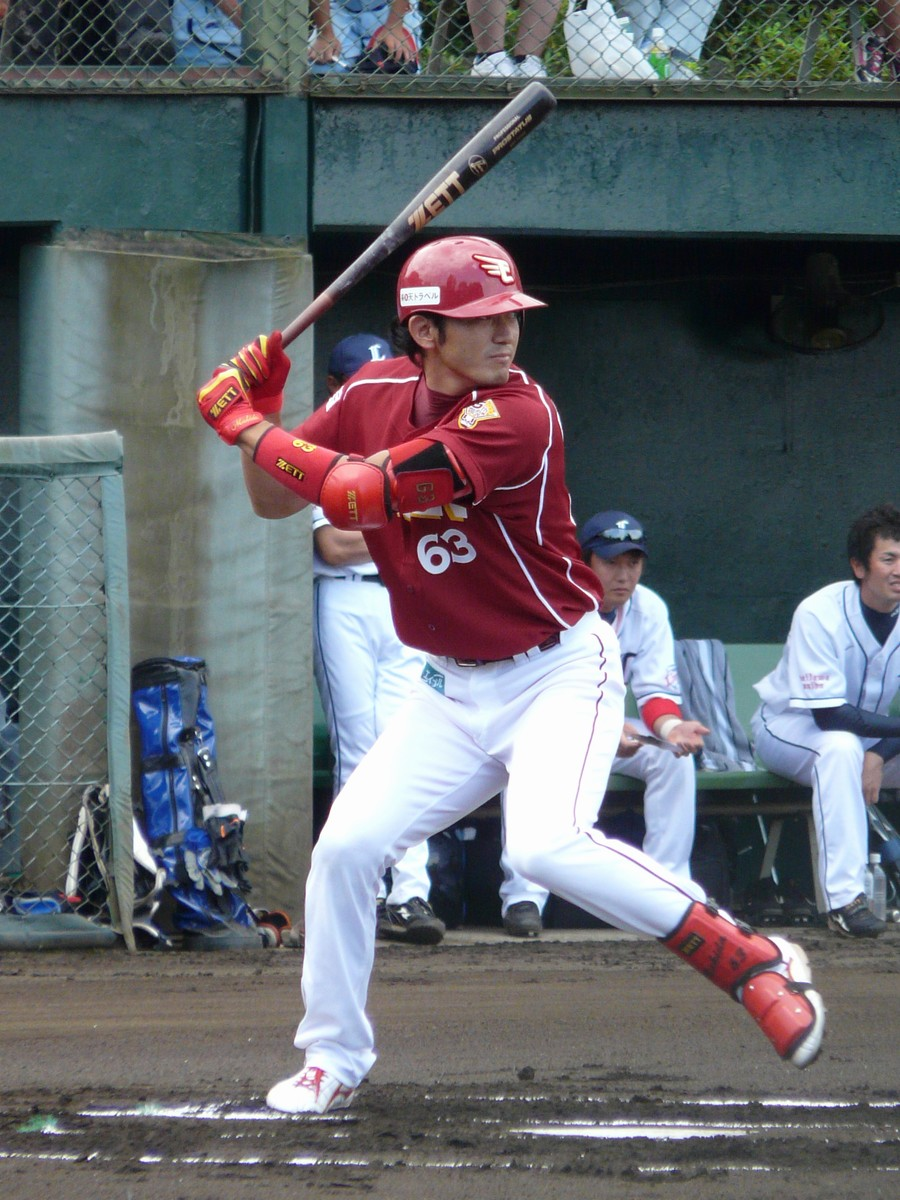
- Makida with the Tohoku Rakuten Golden Eagles

Tohoku Rakuten Golden Eagles – No. 85
- Outfielder / Coach
- Born: June 3, 1982 (age 44); Echizen, Fukui
- Bats: Right Throws: Right

NPB debut
- 2005, for the Tohoku Rakuten Golden Eagles

NPB statistics (through 2016)
- Batting average: .253
- Home runs: 23
- RBI: 150
- Stats at Baseball Reference

Teams
- As player: Tohoku Rakuten Golden Eagles (2005–2007, 2009–2016); As coach: Tohoku Rakuten Golden Eagles (2020–)

Career highlights and awards
- Japan Series champion (2013)

Akihisa Makida (牧田 明久, born June 3, 1982) is a Japanese former professional baseball outfielder and currently second squad coach for the Tohoku Rakuten Golden Eagles of the Nippon Professional Baseball (NPB). He played for the Golden Eagles from 2005 to 2007 and from 2009 to 2016.

On October 14, 2019, Makita become second squad fielding coach for the Tohoku Rakuten Golden Eagles of NPB.
