= Masahiro Tanaka =

Japanese baseball player (born 1988)

Masahiro Tanaka 田中 将大
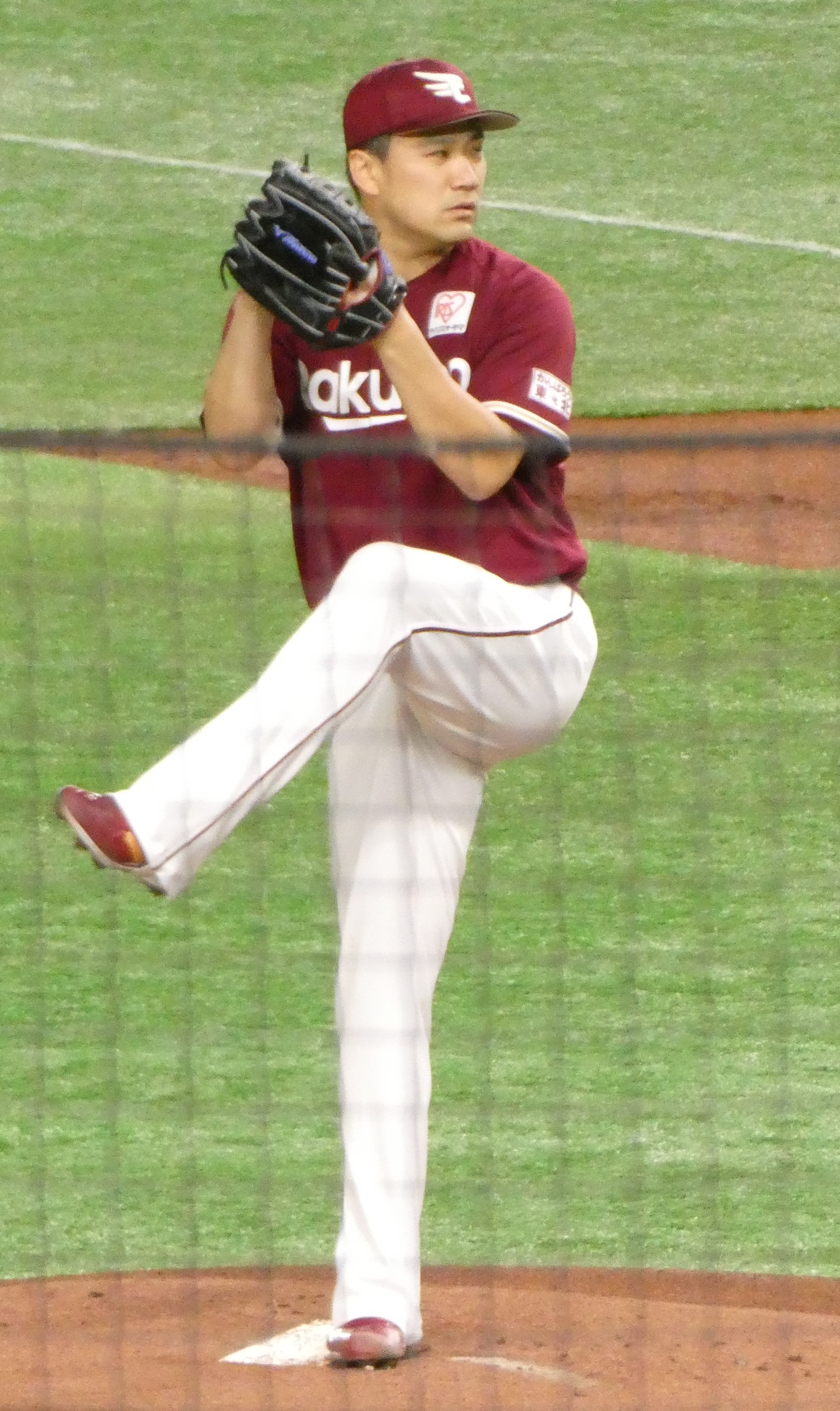
- Tanaka with the Tohoku Rakuten Golden Eagles

Yomiuri Giants – No. 11
- Pitcher
- Born: November 1, 1988 (age 38); Itami, Hyōgo, Japan
- Bats: Right Throws: Right

Professional debut
- NPB: March 29, 2007, for the Tohoku Rakuten Golden Eagles
- MLB: April 4, 2014, for the New York Yankees

NPB statistics (through 2026)
- Win–loss record: 126–76
- Earned run average: 2.76
- Strikeouts: 1,650
- Saves: 3

MLB statistics (through 2020 season)
- Win–loss record: 78–46
- Earned run average: 3.74
- Strikeouts: 991
- Stats at Baseball Reference

Teams
- Tohoku Rakuten Golden Eagles (2007–2013); New York Yankees (2014–2020); Tohoku Rakuten Golden Eagles (2021–2024); Yomiuri Giants (2025–present)

Career highlights and awards
- NPB: Pacific League Rookie of the Year (2007); Pacific League MVP (2013); 2013 PLCS MVP; 8× NPB All-Star (2007–2009, 2011–2013, 2021, 2023); 2× Eiji Sawamura Award (2011, 2013); 2× NPB wins champion (2011, 2013); 2× NPB ERA champion (2011, 2013); NPB strikeout champion (2012); 2× Best Nine Award (2011, 2013); 3× Golden Glove Award (2011–2013); Japan Series champion (2013); Japan Professional Sports Grand Prize (2013); MLB: 2× All-Star (2014, 2019)
Medals
Men's baseball
Representing Japan
Summer Olympics
Gold medal – first place	2020 Tokyo	Team
World Baseball Classic
Gold medal – first place	2009 Los Angeles	Team

Masahiro Tanaka

Japanese name
- Kanji: 田中 将大
- Hiragana: たなか まさひろ
Transcriptions
- Romanization: Tanaka Masahiro

Masahiro Tanaka (田中 将大, Tanaka Masahiro; born November 1, 1988) is a Japanese professional baseball pitcher for the Yomiuri Giants of Nippon Professional Baseball (NPB). He has previously played in NPB for the Tohoku Rakuten Golden Eagles and in Major League Baseball (MLB) for the New York Yankees.

From 2007 through 2013, he played for the Eagles in NPB. Tanaka was posted by the Eagles after the 2013 season to be signed with the New York Yankees in Major League Baseball (MLB) and signed a seven-year, $155 million contract, the fifth-largest deal ever given to a pitcher at the time. He made his major league debut in 2014 and played for the Yankees through the 2020 season, before deciding to return to Japan. Tanaka has said that he decided to return to Japan partly due to anti-Asian racism in the United States during the COVID-19 pandemic.

Tanaka was the Eagles' first-round pick in the 2006 NPB amateur player draft. From 2012 to 2013, he won 26 consecutive decisions, which set a new NPB record. In MLB, Tanaka was the Yankees' Opening Day starter for four seasons and was twice named an All-Star.

== Early life ==
Tanaka was born in Itami, a city in Hyōgo, Japan. He began playing baseball in the first grade as a catcher for the Koyanosato Tigers (a Little League team) alongside current Yomiuri Giants shortstop Hayato Sakamoto, who was then the team's ace pitcher and Tanaka's batterymate. Tanaka and Sakamoto hit third and fourth in the lineup, respectively. He went on to play for the Takarazuka Boys while attending Itami Municipal Matsuzaki Junior High School, being used at both pitcher and catcher because of his strong throwing arm. He was chosen to the Junior All-South Kansai team in his third year of junior high—the equivalent of ninth grade in the United States.

== High school career ==
=== 2004 – spring 2006 ===
Tanaka moved on to Komazawa University Tomakomai High School in Hokkaidō, now playing solely as a pitcher for the team. Armed with a fastball that sat in high-80s and a hard slider, he led his team all the way to a championship in the 87th National High School Baseball tournament held at Koshien Stadium in the summer of his second year (eleventh grade). His very last pitch of the tournament was clocked at 150 km/h (93 mph), the first time a pitcher had ever clocked that speed as a junior in the history of the tournament. Tanaka, already a highly coveted talent by NPB scouts, was chosen to the Japanese team that would play in the IBAF AAA World Junior Championships following the tournament and contributed to the team's title.

Now given the uniform number 1 and officially appointed the team's ace pitcher, Tanaka led Tomakomai High to a regional title as well as a championship in the Meiji Jingu Tournament that fall, hitting home runs in four straight games in the latter himself. While his team was viewed as the favorite going into the 78th National High School Baseball Invitational Tournament to be held the following spring, Tomakomai High was forced to withdraw from the tournament because of allegations of misconduct of some of the players.

=== Summer 2006 ===
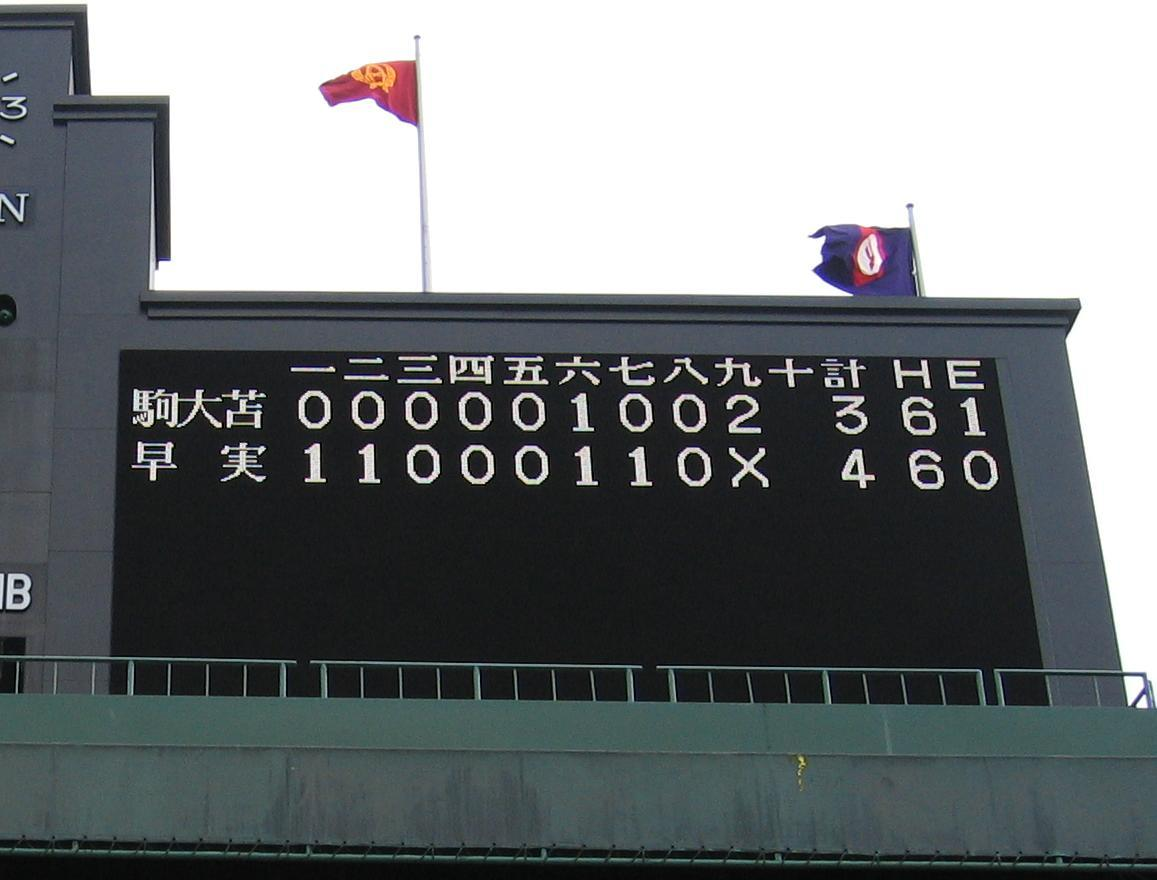
Scoreboard at Koshien Stadium in finals rematch

Tomakomai High earned a berth in the 88th National High School Baseball Championship that summer. Tanaka managed to lead them to their third consecutive appearance in the tournament finals despite being ill prior to the tournament. The team's coach did not start Tanaka in the finals against Waseda Jitsugyo High School (an affiliate school of Waseda University), opting to rest him due to the number of innings he had thrown in the last few games, but he ended up sending Tanaka to the mound in relief midway through the third inning. Tanaka held Waseda Jitsugyo to just one run and struck out 10, but the opponent's ace, Yuki Saito, held Tomakomai High to one run himself on seven hits. The game remained tied 1–1 after 15 innings, forcing a rematch as per tournament regulations. It was the first time in 37 years (since Matsuyama Commercial High School and Misawa High School met in the finals in 1969) that the tournament finals had resulted in a rematch.

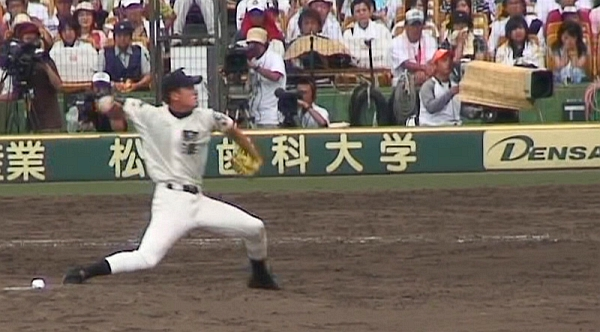
Tanaka as a pitcher for Tomakomai High (taken August 17, 2006, at Koshien Stadium)

In the rematch that ensued the next day, Tanaka again came on in relief in the bottom of the first, but Tomakomai High lost to Waseda Jitsugyo despite his pitching the remaining 7 1/3 innings of the game. (Tanaka was the last batter, striking out to end the game.) The pitchers' duel between Tanaka and Saito in the finals and the rematch that followed became one of the most defining moments in all of sports in Japan that year. Tanaka, dealing with intestinal inflammation, threw 742 pitches in 52 2/3 innings (six appearances) in the tournament, striking out 54 and walking 20 with a 2.22 earned run average (ERA).

Both pitchers were chosen to play for Japan in the United States-Japan High School Baseball Tournament (organized by the Japanese Educational Resource Center in conjunction with the Major League Baseball Urban Youth Academy). Tomakomai High and Waseda Jitsugyo High met one last time in the finals of the Nojigiku Hyōgo National Sports Festival, the last tournament of Tanaka's high school career, but Tomakomai High was shut out by Saito and lost (1–0) to Waseda Jitsugyo, finishing second yet again.

=== Aftermath ===
Tanaka struck out 458 batters over the course of his high school career (2004–2006), surpassing Daisuke Matsuzaka's previous national high school record of 423 with Yokohama Senior High School. He also hit 13 home runs during those three years.

After rival Yuki Saito announced that he would not be declaring for the upcoming draft, opting to go on to Waseda University instead, Tanaka became the single most highly touted high school player eligible to be picked. On September 25, in the 2006 NPB high school draft, the Hokkaido Nippon Ham Fighters, Orix Buffaloes, Yokohama BayStars and Tohoku Rakuten Golden Eagles all selected Tanaka with their first-round picks. The Golden Eagles drew the winning straw, signing him to a base salary of 15 million yen, a signing bonus of 100 million yen and additional performance-based incentives, the equivalent of what a first-round college or industrial league-player would normally receive, on November 2. He was also given the uniform number 18, which typically denotes a team's staff ace in Japanese professional baseball.

== Professional career ==
=== Tohoku Rakuten Golden Eagles ===
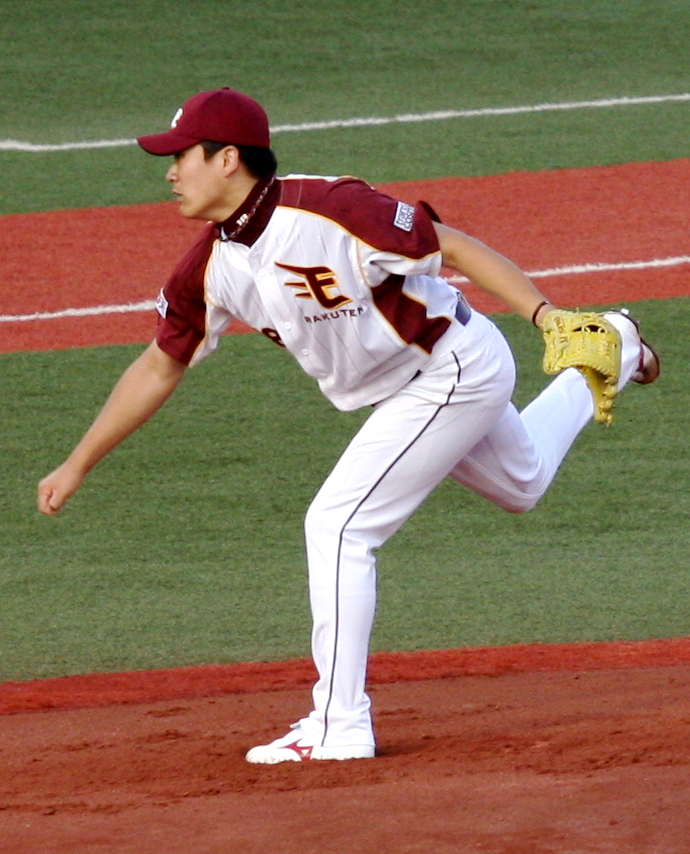
Tanaka pitching for the Tohoku Rakuten Golden Eagles in 2007

==== 2007 ====
Tanaka was named to the Eagles' ichigun (Japanese equivalent of "major league") roster during Spring training of his rookie year, and made his professional debut on March 29, 2007, against the Fukuoka SoftBank Hawks as the starting pitcher, but gave up six runs on six hits and a walk in 1 2/3 innings. Though he was not charged with a loss, as the Eagles made a furious comeback to tie the game up in the fourth, he was seen sitting in the dugout in tears after being taken out of the game.

On April 18, in a home game against the Hawks, he held the team to two runs and struck out 13 in a complete game win, the first win of his professional career. He became the first pitcher since Yu Darvish to throw a complete-game shutout as a rookie out of high school on June 13 in an interleague game against the Chunichi Dragons. He also became the first pitcher since Daisuke Matsuzaka in 1999 to be voted the starter of the NPB All-Star Game (representing the Pacific League) as a rookie out of high school, starting in Game 2 on July 22 and clocking a personal-high 153 km/h (95 mph) (though he gave up six runs in two innings in that start).

On July 10, Tanaka recorded his 100th strikeout of the season in just 96 2/3 innings, tying the record for the fastest to reach 100 career strikeouts (in innings) held by former Hanshin Tigers pitcher Yutaka Enatsu. He became the first pitcher to record double-digit wins in Eagles franchise history (and the first to do so as a rookie out of high school in Japanese professional baseball since Matsuzaka) in a win against the Saitama Seibu Lions on August 31.

Tanaka finished the year with an 11–7 record and a 3.82 ERA, faring particularly well against the Hawks (5–0 in six starts). His 196 strikeouts were the second-most by any pitcher in either league (Pacific or Central) and the fourth-most as a rookie out of high school in Japanese professional baseball history. He was named the Pacific League Most Valuable Rookie, the first player out of high school to win the award since Matsuzaka.

==== 2008 ====
In 2008, Tanaka was penciled into the front end of the Eagles' starting rotation for the second straight season. He earned his first career win at Sapporo Dome, located in his former home of Hokkaido, in a win against the Fighters on May 4, drawing cheers from the crowd despite pitching for the away team. He came on in relief for the first time in his career in an interleague game against the Hiroshima Carp on June 22, recording his first career save.

Tanaka was able to make only 24 starts (as opposed to 28 in his rookie season), missing playing time because of both a brief rehab stint in the minors due to inflammation in his shoulder and his participation in the 2008 Beijing Olympics as a member of the Japanese national team. He entered the last game of the regular season against the Fukuoka SoftBank Hawks with nine wins, looking to both earn his tenth win of the season and prevent the Eagles from finishing in last place. While he held the Hawks to no runs over nine innings, Hawks starter Toshiya Sugiuchi equaled his performance and Tanaka fell short of his goal of reaching double-digit wins. The Eagles eventually won in walk-off fashion in the twelfth inning, finishing one game ahead of the Hawks for fifth place in the regular season standings.

==== 2009 ====
Tanaka got off to an utterly dominant start to the 2009 season, pitching a four-hit complete-game shutout against the Hawks in his first start on April 7, a one-run complete game win against the Chiba Lotte Marines on April 14 (his first career win against the Marines, the only other Pacific League team he had yet to record a win against), a three-hit complete-game shutout against the Marines on April 22, and an 11-strikeout, one-run complete game win against the Fighters on April 29. The fourth win marked the 1,500th of Eagles manager Katsuya Nomura's career and made Tanaka the first pitcher to start the season with four consecutive complete game wins since Satoru Komiyama (then with the Marines) and Shigetoshi Hasegawa (Orix BlueWave) both accomplished the feat in 1993. However, though he went 4–0 with a 0.50 ERA for the month of April, striking out 37 and allowing just 24 baserunners in 36 innings and winning Pacific League monthly Most Valuable Player honors for the first time in his career, he was removed from the active roster on April 30 with a minor shoulder strain as a result of fatigue. He returned to the team on May 13, pitching seven innings of three run-ball against the Fighters for his fifth straight win to start the season.

==== 2013 ====
On September 13, 2013, Tanaka set a new NPB record with his 21st consecutive win in the 2013 season in a 6–2 complete game victory over the Orix Buffaloes at home in Sendai at Kleenex Stadium. This victory was Tanaka's 25th consecutive win, including his final four starts in 2012. It also eclipsed the longest consecutive winning streak for MLB pitchers, set at 24 by Carl Hubbell in the 1936 and 1937 seasons. On September 26, 2013, Tanaka relieved to close the last 2/3 inning. With a one run lead, he sealed the victory and the Eagles' first Pacific League title. It was his first appearance as a closer in the 2013 season.

He ended the regular season with a 24–0 record and 1.27 ERA, tops in both leagues. He also became the second post-war starting pitcher with an undefeated season with minimum innings required for an ERA title since Shigekuni Mashiba.

Tanaka went on to win his second Sawamura Award as the Golden Eagles competed for their first Japan Series title. Taking postseason games into account, his 2013 record was 30–1. The lone loss came in Game 6 of the 2013 Japan Series, a 160-pitch complete game, and he avenged that loss as he picked up the save in the decisive Game 7.

=== New York Yankees ===
Tanaka was repeatedly scouted by MLB representatives during the 2013 season. Through the revised posting system, Rakuten posted Tanaka to MLB during the 2013–14 offseason at a fee of $20 million. On December 26, 2013, all 30 MLB teams were notified that the 30-day period to sign the 25-year-old right-hander began at 8 a.m. EST. Clubs had until 5 p.m. EST on January 24, 2014, to reach an agreement with Tanaka, who was represented by agent Casey Close.

During the month-long period following Tanaka's posting, teams reported to be serious suitors included the New York Yankees, Los Angeles Dodgers, Chicago Cubs, Chicago White Sox, Arizona Diamondbacks, and Houston Astros. On January 22, 2014, Tanaka signed a seven-year contract worth $155 million with the Yankees. The contract contained an opt-out clause after the fourth year and a full no-trade clause.

==== 2014 ====
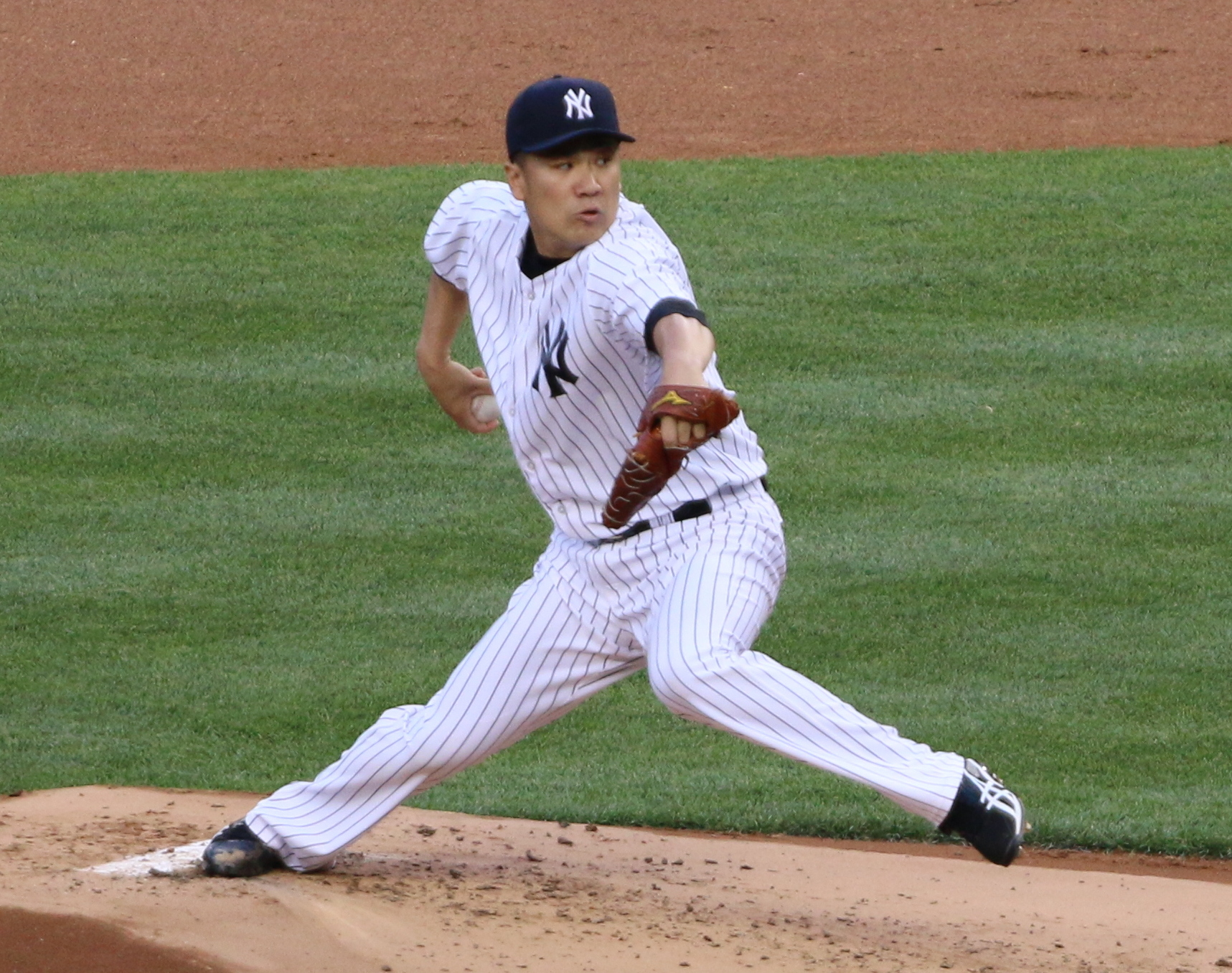
Tanaka in 2014

Tanaka made his Major League debut on April 4, 2014, against the Toronto Blue Jays and gave up a home run to the first batter he faced, ex-Yankee Melky Cabrera. Tanaka would receive his first MLB win in the game, pitching seven innings with eight strikeouts in the Yankees 7–3 win against the Blue Jays. Tanaka made his first Yankees home start on April 9, against the Baltimore Orioles where he struck out ten batters in seven innings but received a no-decision as the Yankees lost the game 5–4. During an interleague game against the New York Mets on May 14, Tanaka recorded his first major league hit off of José Valverde and pitched his first complete game in the majors as the Yankees shut out the Mets 4–0. Tanaka began his American career with a 6–0 record before he received his first loss in MLB on May 20, as the Yankees lost to the Chicago Cubs 6–1; it was his first loss in any professional baseball league since August 19, 2012.

In June, Tanaka recorded his 100th strikeout of the season in a complete game against the Seattle Mariners; his bid for a shutout was ended when former Yankee Robinson Canó hit a two-run home run in the ninth inning. Tanaka began the year with an 11–1 record and a 1.99 ERA in his first 14 starts while striking out 113 batters in 99 innings. He became the first Yankees rookie to win 12 games by the All-Star break and was selected to the Major League Baseball All-Star Game as a reserve for the American League. He and teammate Dellin Betances were the first Yankees rookie pitchers to earn an All-Star Game nod since Spec Shea in 1947.

Following a loss to the Cleveland Indians on July 8, 2014, in which he gave up five runs in 6 2/3 innings, Tanaka began to experience discomfort in his right arm. The next day, Tanaka was placed on the disabled list due to right elbow inflammation. He had compiled a 12–4 record with a 2.51 ERA in 18 starts and was forced to withdraw from the All-Star Game as a result of the injury. An MRI revealed that his elbow had a partially torn UCL. At the behest of several doctors, Tanaka received a PRP shot from Yankees' head team physician Dr. Christopher Ahmad and rested his elbow for 6 weeks instead of having Tommy John surgery to repair his UCL. Tanaka returned on September 21 against the Blue Jays, receiving his 13th win of the season in the Yankees' 5–2 victory over the Blue Jays. He would only pitch one more time during the 2014 season, a loss to the Boston Red Sox in which he gave up seven runs (five earned) in 1 2/3 innings. In the 20 starts of his first major league season in 2014, Tanaka posted a 2.77 ERA with 141 strikeouts in 136 1/3 innings and a 13–5 record.

After his 2014 season, there was much speculation by sports media and fans that Tanaka should have undergone surgery rather than follow his doctors' suggestions and rehab the injury. This was mostly due to the belief that he would need to get the surgery despite the rehab program.

==== 2015 ====
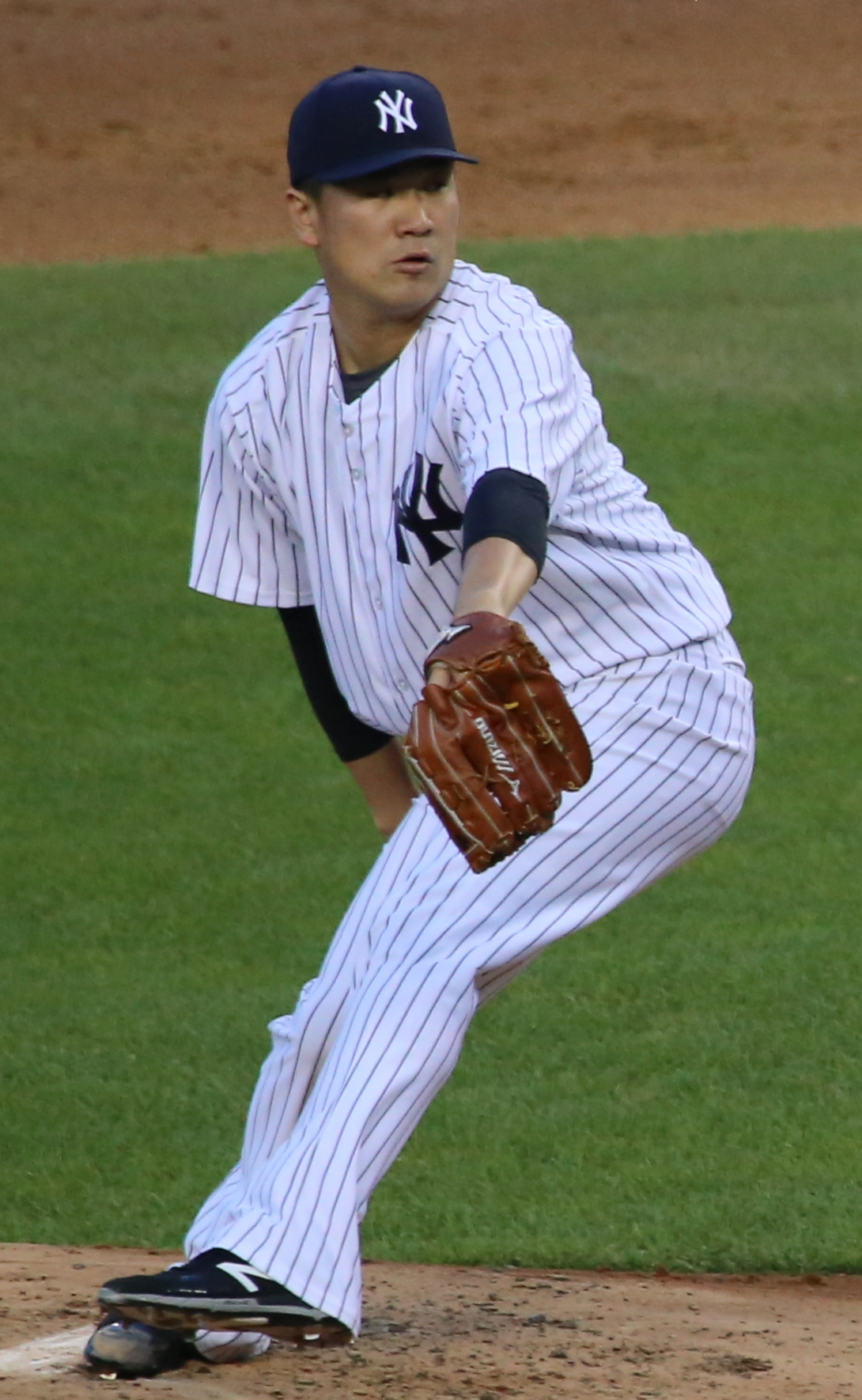
Tanaka pitching for the Yankees in 2015

Tanaka was chosen by Joe Girardi to be the Opening Day starter for the Yankees. He made the Opening Day start on April 6, 2015, against the Blue Jays, surrendering five runs in the third inning, including a home run by Edwin Encarnación, as the Yankees lost. On April 28, Tanaka was placed on the disabled list with forearm and wrist soreness; he had gone 2–1 with a 3.22 ERA in four starts. The injury combined with his poor first outing led many in the sports media to speculate that Tanaka should undergo Tommy John surgery against the wishes of his doctors. After missing a month, he returned on June 3 against the Seattle Mariners, where he pitched seven innings with nine strikeouts as the Yankees won 3–1. In a June 27 start against the Houston Astros, Tanaka gave up a career-high six earned runs.

Tanaka was diagnosed with a Grade 1 hamstring strain on September 20, sustaining the injury during an interleague game against the New York Mets when running to first base after a bunt attempt. He would miss his next start.

Tanaka's season ended with a 3–0 loss to the Houston Astros in the American League Wild Card game, in which he pitched five innings and allowed two earned runs. In 24 starts, Tanaka went 12–7 with a 3.51 ERA in 154 innings, posting a WHIP of only 0.994, the lowest amongst all American League starters with at least 150 innings pitched. One area of struggle for Tanaka in 2015 was the home run: he gave up 25 of them.

==== 2016 ====
Tanaka was named the Yankees' Opening Day starter in 2016 for the second consecutive season. He received a no-decision against the Houston Astros, giving up two runs in 5 2/3 innings. On April 17, Tanaka faced his former Rakuten teammate Hisashi Iwakuma of the Seattle Mariners for the first time in the United States, the first time in MLB history that two former Japanese teammates pitched against each other. Tanaka earned the win, allowing two earned runs in seven innings and striking out six, while Iwakuma took the loss. In his first eight starts, Tanaka compiled a 1–0 record, receiving seven no-decisions, including eight shutout innings against the Baltimore Orioles on May 5. Tanaka tied his career high by giving up six earned runs in six innings in a June 29 start against the Texas Rangers. On July 10, Tanaka pitched his shortest start of the season, lasting only 4 2/3 innings in a no-decision against the Cleveland Indians. Prior to the All-Star Break, Tanaka went 6–2 with a 3.23 ERA in 18 starts, pitching 117 innings and striking out 93.

Tanaka started in the Subway Series for the third straight season, losing to the Mets on August 2 by giving up seven runs (six earned) in 6 1/3 innings. It would be his final loss of 2016, as Tanaka would finish the season strong and end the year by winning seven consecutive decisions in his last ten starts. Tanaka faced Iwakuma again on August 24, throwing seven shutout innings as Tanaka received the win and Iwakuma received the loss again in their second meeting. On September 10, Tanaka struck out a season-high 10 batters in 7 1/3 innings against the Tampa Bay Rays. In his next start, Tanaka pitched seven innings of one-run baseball against the Boston Red Sox, lowering his ERA to 2.97, the best in the American League. After a win against the Rays on September 21 in which he allowed four home runs, Tanaka was diagnosed with a flexor mass strain and was shut down for five days. After the strain healed, it was announced that Tanaka would not pitch in his final scheduled start of the season as the Yankees were already eliminated from postseason contention and the team felt it was not necessary to risk Tanaka's health in a meaningless game. In the second half of 2016, Tanaka pitched to an 8–2 record and a 2.83 ERA in 13 games, throwing 82 2/3 innings and striking out 72.

In 2016, Tanaka made a career-high 31 starts and avoided a disabled list stint for the first time in his MLB career. He finished the year pitching 199 2/3 innings with a 14–4 record, 165 strikeouts and a 3.07 ERA, the third-best in the American League. Tanaka set career-highs in innings pitched, wins, strikeouts and WAR (Wins Above Replacement) (he finished the year with 5.4 WAR, the third most of any pitcher in the league). He finished tied for seventh in the voting for the American League Cy Young with Aaron Sanchez.

==== 2017 ====
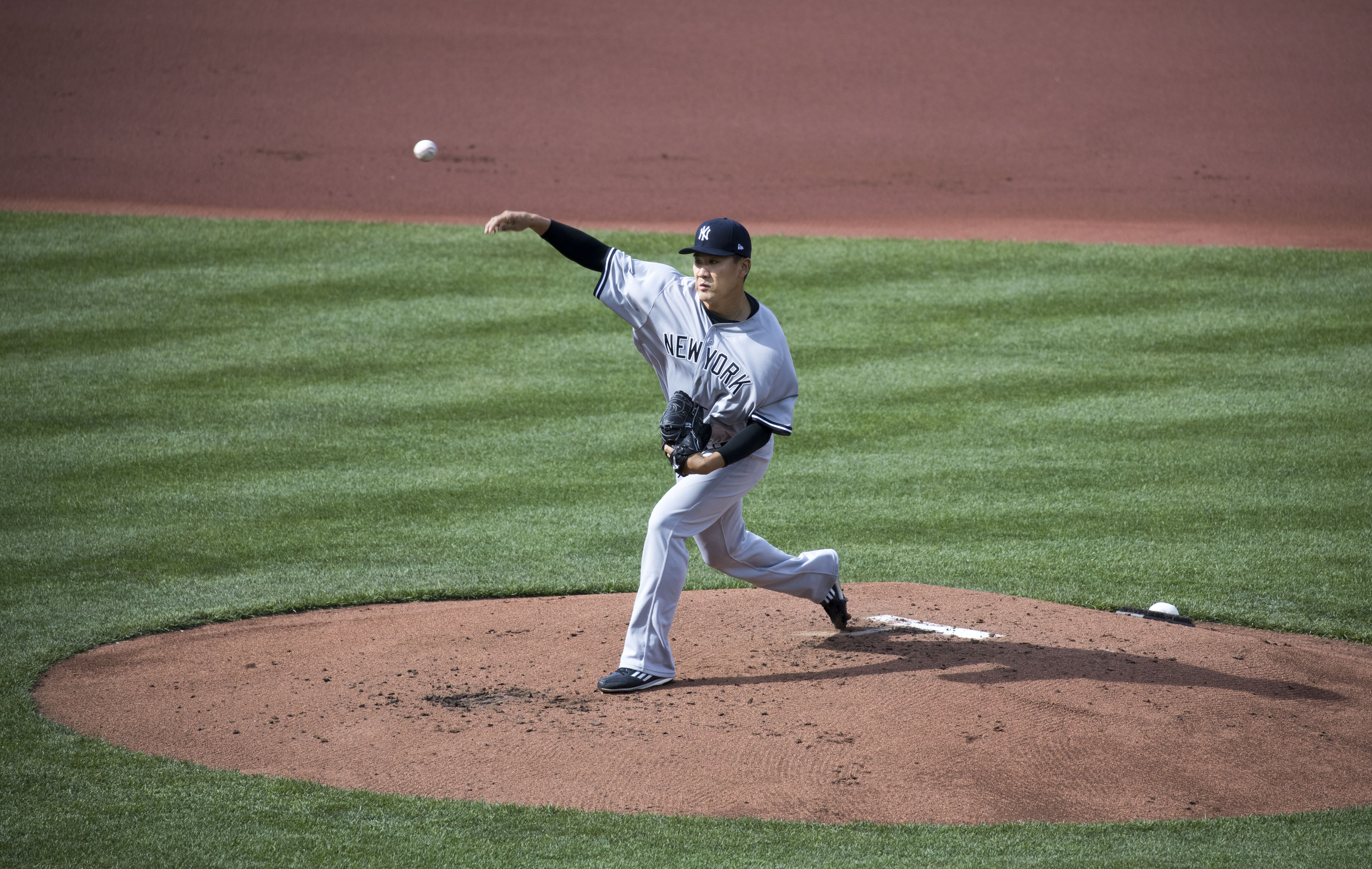
Tanaka pitching in April, 2017

On February 14, 2017, Girardi named Tanaka the Opening Day starter for the third season in a row. Tanaka was dominant in Spring Training, allowing only one earned run in 23 2/3 innings for a 0.38 ERA. Making the Opening Day start against the Tampa Bay Rays on April 2, Tanaka lasted only 2 2/3 innings, allowing a career-high seven earned runs as the Yankees lost by a score of 7–3. Tanaka's season started slowly until pitching a complete-game shutout against the Red Sox on April 27, the second of his career. Tanaka's shutout was notable in that he only threw 97 pitches, pitching what is colloquially referred to as a "Maddux" (a complete-game shutout with fewer than 100 pitches), the first by any pitcher in the 2017 season. Tanaka allowed more than three earned runs only once in the six starts after his Opening Day debacle, lowering his ERA to 4.36 by May 8.

Tanaka was scheduled to start in Game 2 of the May 14 doubleheader against the Houston Astros, notable for being the same game in which Derek Jeter would have his number retired in a pregame ceremony. Tanaka would give up a career-high eight earned runs in 1 2/3 innings, allowing four home runs. Critics blasted Tanaka for "ruining" what was supposed to be a special night for Jeter and the Yankees. In his next start, he allowed six runs in three innings against the Tampa Bay Rays, giving up three home runs in the process. Tanaka appeared to improve in a May 25 start against the Oakland Athletics, as he struck out a career-high 13 batters. However, he would allow seven runs to the Baltimore Orioles and five runs to the Boston Red Sox in his next two starts, both losses, leaving his record at 5–7 and his ERA at 6.55 by June 6. Tanaka rebounded against the Los Angeles Angels in a no-decision but then faltered again versus the Oakland Athletics, as he gave up three more home runs en route to his sixth consecutive loss.

Baseball analysts attempted to uncover the root cause of Tanaka's sudden struggles, which were surprising given his excellent 2016 and his reputation as the Yankees' ace since 2014. Critics pointed to a "flat" slider, missing badly on several pitches and getting buried in favorable hitters' counts. Some raised concerns that he was playing injured and needed Tommy John surgery; however, the Yankees (and Tanaka himself) insisted that Tanaka was at full health. Key to Tanaka's struggles was the home run ball, as he allowed 21 home runs in the first 76 2/3 innings of the season, compared to allowing only 22 home runs in the entire 2016 season. On June 23, Tanaka started against fellow Japanese pitcher Yu Darvish for the first time in the United States, outdueling him by throwing eight shutout innings and striking out nine in a no-decision.

Against the Rays on July 28, Tanaka set a new career-high by striking out 14 batters. Tanaka took a perfect game into the sixth inning and allowed only one run on two hits in eight innings pitched. On August 12, Tanaka was placed on the 10-day disabled list due to right shoulder inflammation. He missed only one start. On August 27, Tanaka earned his tenth win of the season against the Seattle Mariners, making him the first Japanese pitcher in MLB history to have double-digit wins in all of his first four seasons. On September 29 against the Blue Jays, his final start of the regular season, Tanaka again set a new career-high by striking out 15 batters, tied with Stephen Strasburg for the most single-game strikeouts in 2017. In 30 starts of 2017, he finished the year with a 13–12 record, a 4.74 ERA, 194 strikeouts, and 35 home runs allowed in 178 1/3 innings pitched.

In the postseason, Tanaka earned the win in Game 3 of the 2017 American League Division Series against the Indians after throwing seven shutout innings. He started Game 1 of the 2017 American League Championship Series against Dallas Keuchel and the Astros in a rematch of the 2015 AL Wild Card Game, taking the loss after allowing two runs in six innings. However, he faced Keuchel again in Game 5, this time earning the win as he pitched seven shutout innings, striking out eight to help the Yankees take a 3–2 series lead.

On November 3, Tanaka announced that he would not exercise the opt-out clause in his contract, instead staying with the Yankees for the remaining three years and $67 million left on his original deal.

==== 2018 ====
Tanaka's first start of 2018 went smoothly as he retired 13 batters in a row, struck out eight, and allowed one run, which was a solo homer by Randal Grichuk in 6+ innings as the Yankees won 4–2. While playing at Citi Field against the Mets on June 8, Tanaka scored his first career run after a sacrifice fly from Aaron Judge, but shortly after, he left the game after his hamstrings grew stiff. The next day, on June 9, Tanaka wound up on the 10-day disabled list due to mild strains in both hamstrings. In a short time after his return from the DL, he pitched a complete-game shutout in a 4–0 win over the Rays.

==== 2019 ====
Due to Luis Severino's rotator cuff injury, the Yankees tapped Tanaka for his fourth Opening Day start on March 28, 2019. The start gave him the record for most Opening Day starts by a Japanese pitcher with four, passing Hideo Nomo. Tanaka would pitch 5 2/3 innings, allowing 6 hits and 2 runs while striking out 5 in the Yankees 7–2 win vs the Orioles. This was Tanaka's first opening day victory. On 17 June Tanaka threw a complete game two-hit shutout and made 10 strikeouts in the Yankees’ 3–0 victory against Rays on Monday evening at Yankee Stadium. On June 29, against the Red Sox at London Stadium, Tanaka allowed 6 runs in the first inning, and was lifted after 2 outs. It was the first time in his career that he could not complete an inning while starting, but nevertheless, the Yankees won 17–13. On July 6, Tanaka was named to the 2019 Major League Baseball All-Star Game as an injury replacement for Toronto Blue Jays pitcher Marcus Stroman.

July 25 against the Red Sox turned out to be Tanaka's worst outing in professional baseball, as he allowed 7 runs in the first inning and 5 more in the fourth inning, bringing his total to 12 runs, the most he allowed in a single start, while only retiring 10 hitters (4 strikeouts). It was also the most earned runs allowed by a Yankees pitcher since 1923.

Tanaka allowed one run over five innings in the 2019 ALDS. In Game 1 of the 2019 ALCS, Tanaka allowed one hit over six innings against the Astros. On October 24, Tanaka underwent right elbow surgery to remove bone spurs.

==== 2020 ====
On July 4, 2020, in a Yankees simulated game, Tanaka was struck in the head by a line drive off of the bat of Giancarlo Stanton and suffered a mild concussion. Despite this, Tanaka was able to make his first start on August 1 against the Red Sox, where he went 2 2/3 innings, giving up two runs, and striking out 3. The Yankees won 5–2. Tanaka finished the year with a 3–3 record and 3.56 ERA in 10 appearances.

=== Tohoku Rakuten Golden Eagles (second stint) ===
After the 2020 season, Tanaka decided to leave the MLB to return to Japan. Tanaka has said that he decided to return to Japan partly due to anti-Asian racism in the United States during the COVID-19 pandemic. Specifically, he feared for the safety of his wife and children. He said his child who was in kindergarten at the time faced a negative incident, but did not disclose specific details to the media. In March 2021, months after Tanaka had already returned to Japan, Yankees General Manager Brian Cashman commented: "(It is) heartbreaking to hear any of these stories that come out. We need to, as a society, do a better job to make sure that (racism) is unwelcomed in any walk of life."

On January 28, 2021, Tanaka agreed to a two-year contract to return to the Tohoku Rakuten Golden Eagles of Nippon Professional Baseball. The deal was worth 900 million yen ($8.6 million) a year with additional incentives, making him the highest-paid player in NPB history. His uniform number is 18.

On January 7, 2023, Tanaka re-signed with Rakuten on a one-year contract. In 24 games, he posted a 7–11 record and 4.91 ERA with 81 strikeouts in 139 1/3 innings. Following the season, on October 31, Tanaka underwent a right-elbow cleanup surgery.

Tanaka made one appearance for Rakuten in 2024, taking the loss after allowing four runs on six hits in five innings of work. On November 24, 2024, Tanaka and the Eagles parted ways.

=== Yomiuri Giants ===
On December 15, 2024, Tanaka signed with the Yomiuri Giants of Nippon Professional Baseball. On September 30, 2025, he achieved his third win of the season and his 200th career win in the US and Japan combined.

== International career ==
=== 2008 Olympics ===
Tanaka was the only player to be chosen for the Japan national team to play in the 2008 Beijing Olympics from the Eagles, becoming the youngest Japanese baseball player to play in the Olympics as a pro in the history of the event. He pitched in relief in Japan's first game against Cuba in the group stage, throwing one scoreless inning and striking out three. While Tanaka saw limited playing time as a middle reliever for the team, he recorded a 0.00 ERA and the highest strikeout rate of any pitcher on the team.

=== World Baseball Classic ===
Tanaka also played for Japan in the 2009 World Baseball Classic, coming on in relief for Satoshi Komatsu midway through the sixth inning of the seeding match against South Korea in the second round but surrendering a home run to Lee Bum-Ho (Japan won 6–2). He pitched in the semi-finals against the United States, giving up a triple to Jimmy Rollins but striking out David Wright to end the inning, contributing to Japan's second consecutive championship in the tournament.

Tanaka was highly expected to be the staff ace of Japan in the 2013 WBC, but poor form in the build-up to the tournament led to concern over his performance. He started the pool opener against Brazil and conceded an unearned run. He came on as a reliever against Cuba and again conceded a run, before appearing to return to his usual form by striking out 6 batters in 2 innings. Tanaka again came on as a reliever against Chinese Taipei and had 2 good innings, shutting out the side with 4 strike outs, before conceding the equalizer in his third inning at the bottom of the 8th. Up to that point, Tanaka's inconsistency produced an ERA of 3.00, allowing 10 hits and 3 runs (2 earned) in 6 innings while striking out 10.

== Pitching style ==
Tanaka is a right-handed pitcher who throws from a high three-quarter arm slot in a drop-and-drive motion. He throws two fastballs (four-seam, two-seam) usually in the low-90s that top out at 97 mph. He also has a plus 84–88 mph splitter with late downward action, a solid slider in the low to mid-80s, and an occasional curveball. Tanaka has added a high-80s cutter to repertoire in his MLB career. Post-UCL (elbow) injury, Tanaka has taken time to recover his fastball velocity, and he currently favors a two-seamer over the four-seam fastball he used to favor. He also has excellent command, posting a walks per nine innings ratio of 1.8 and a strikeout-to-walk ratio of 4.76 in his MLB career.

== Nickname ==
Tanaka is often affectionately referred to as Mā-kun (マー君, Mā-kun) by both fans and the media. The nickname stuck after Tanaka and Saito told the media that that was what Tanaka was called on the team during the U.S.-Japan High School Baseball Tournament that followed the national tournament in 2006. Eagles manager Katsuya Nomura also often refers to Tanaka as "Mā-kun" in interviews. While older players on the team generally call Tanaka by his surname, some call him by the abbreviated nickname "Mā". While on the Yankees, Tanaka wore the nickname "Masa" on his jersey during Players Weekend in 2017.

== Personal life ==
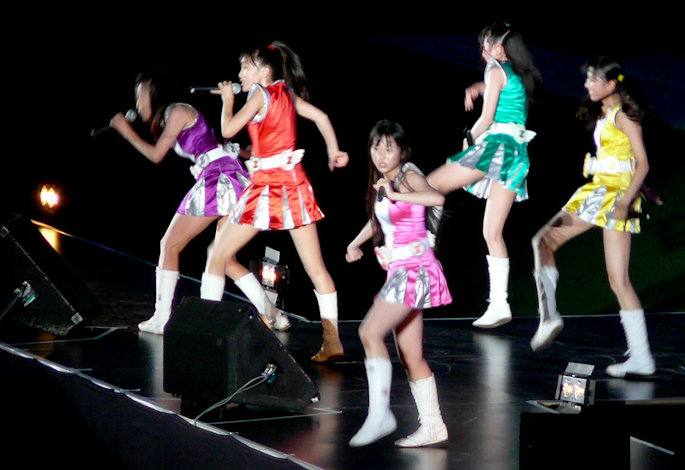
Tanaka's practice gloves reflect five signature colors of Momoiro Clover Z members.

Tanaka has stated that he is an avid fan of Momoiro Clover Z, a popular female idol group in Japan. He has attended the group's concerts multiple times. When practicing he wears custom-made multicolored gloves in the five Momoiro Clover Z member colors (pictured) and he plays official games in gloves embroidered with a clover leaf. When his baseball team presented its fan club members with "cheering goods", the towel saying "Tanaka" used the same five colors. During the game in which he set a new Japanese professional baseball record of 16 consecutive victories in one season, cheer banners of the same color scheme were distributed among the spectators.

He has used the group's songs as his "warm-up song" (music that is played at a baseball game when a pitcher appears on the field and does his warm-up routine). After he joined Yankees, his warm-up song at home games is "My Dear Fellow" by Momoiro Clover Z. This song was specially made for Tanaka and unveiled when he debuted at Yankee Stadium, before it was released in Japan. New York Post said that:

for when the rookie threw his warmup pitches, he did so to the accompaniment of a Japanese pop song — a tune unlike any other ever played here … Who else arrives in town with customized musical accompaniment?

While NJ.com, said:

Like Tanaka, the act is a Japanese sensation. And like Momoiro Clover Z, Tanaka made his presence vociferously known in the Bronx."

On 29 January 2020, Tanaka announced on his Twitter feed that he had created a YouTube channel. In his video, Tanaka stated he would be uploading videos featuring him and his daily life.

=== Marriage ===
Tanaka is married to Mai Satoda, former member and former supervisor of the idol group Country Musume and television personality. The wedding ceremony was held in Hawaii in December 2012. Tanaka's wife gave birth to a boy on February 15, 2016. Satoda is also a fan of Momoiro Clover Z.

== See also ==
- List of Major League Baseball players from Japan
