= 2013 Japan Series =

| Team (Wins) | Managers | Season |
|---|---|---|
| Tohoku Rakuten Golden Eagles (4) | Senichi Hoshino | 82–59–3, (.582), GA: 7.5 |
| Yomiuri Giants (3) | Tatsunori Hara | 84–53–7, (.613), GA: 12.5 |
- Dates: October 26 – November 3
- MVP: Manabu Mima (Tohoku)
- FSA: Hisayoshi Chōno (Yomiuri)

Broadcast
- Television: In Japan: KHB (Games 1, 2 and 7); NTV (Games 3, 4 and 5); TBC (Game 6)

The 2013 Japan Series (known as the Konami Nippon Series 2013 for sponsorship reasons) was the 64th edition of Nippon Professional Baseball's (NPB) championship series known colloquially as the Japan Series. The best-of-seven playoff was won by the Pacific League champion Tohoku Rakuten Golden Eagles in seven games over the Central League champion Yomiuri Giants. It was the Eagles' first Japan Series appearance and their first win since the team's creation in 2005. The series began on Saturday, October 26, 2013 and ended on Sunday, November 3, 2013 at the Miyagi Baseball Stadium in Sendai, Miyagi Prefecture. Eagles' starting pitcher Manabu Mima, who was the winning pitcher in Games 3 and 7, was named the Japan Series Most Valuable Player (MVP). This was also the last Japan Series that Konami would sponsor, as SMBC would take over the naming rights in 2014. Before the 2022 Japan Series, it was the last Japan Series to go the full 7 games, however 2022 would see 1 drawn game, so the 2023 Japan Series would be the latest to be played to a full 7 game series where each game had a winner declared.

== Climax Series ==
First Stage
Central League
2 | Hanshin Tigers | 0
3 | Hiroshima Toyo Carp | 2
Pacific League
2 | Saitama Seibu Lions | 1
3 | Chiba Lotte Marines | 2

Final Stage
1 | Yomiuri Giants | 4
3 | Hiroshima Toyo Carp | 0
1 | Tohoku Rakuten Golden Eagles | 4
3 | Chiba Lotte Marines | 1

Japan Series
CL1 | Yomiuri Giants | 3
PL1 | Tohoku Rakuten Golden Eagles | 4

== Summary ==
Tohoku Rakuten Golden Eagles won the series, 4–3.

| Game | Date | Score | Location | Time | Attendance |
|---|---|---|---|---|---|
| 1 | October 26 | Yomiuri Giants – 2, Tohoku Rakuten Golden Eagles – 0 | Kleenex Stadium | 3:20 | 25,209 |
| 2 | October 27 | Yomiuri Giants – 1, Tohoku Rakuten Golden Eagles – 2 | Kleenex Stadium | 3:16 | 25,219 |
| 3 | October 29 | Tohoku Rakuten Golden Eagles – 5, Yomiuri Giants – 1 | Tokyo Dome | 3:26 | 44,940 |
| 4 | October 30 | Tohoku Rakuten Golden Eagles – 5, Yomiuri Giants – 6 | Tokyo Dome | 4:07 | 44,968 |
| 5 | October 31 | Tohoku Rakuten Golden Eagles – 4, Yomiuri Giants – 2 (10) | Tokyo Dome | 3:49 | 44,995 |
| 6 | November 2 | Yomiuri Giants – 4, Tohoku Rakuten Golden Eagles – 2 | Kleenex Stadium | 3:16 | 25,271 |
| 7 | November 3 | Yomiuri Giants – 0, Tohoku Rakuten Golden Eagles – 3 | Kleenex Stadium | 3:15 | 25,249 |

== Game summaries ==
=== Game 1 ===
Saturday, October 26, 2013, 6:35 pm (JST) at Nippon Paper Kleenex Stadium Miyagi in Sendai, Miyagi Prefecture
| Team | 1 | 2 | 3 | 4 | 5 | 6 | 7 | 8 | 9 | R | H | E |
|---|---|---|---|---|---|---|---|---|---|---|---|---|
| Yomiuri | 0 | 0 | 0 | 0 | 1 | 0 | 0 | 1 | 0 | 2 | 4 | 1 |
| Rakuten | 0 | 0 | 0 | 0 | 0 | 0 | 0 | 0 | 0 | 0 | 9 | 1 |
WP: Tetsuya Utsumi (1–0) LP: Takahiro Norimoto (0–1) Sv: Kentaro Nishimura (1); Home runs: YOM: Shuichi Murata (1); RAK: None

Yomiuri Giants' starter Tetsuya Utsumi and relievers Scott Mathieson, Tetsuya Yamaguchi and Kentaro Nishimura combined on a nine-hit shutout to beat the Tohoku Rakuten Golden Eagles and take one-game lead in the Series. Even though they failed to score in the game, the Eagles had several scoring opportunities. Their leadoff man reached base in six innings and they also ended six innings with at least one runner in scoring position. Eagles' rookie-starter Takahiro Norimoto performed well, holding the Giants to only four hits through eight and a third innings. The Giants' two runs came from a Hisayoshi Chono RBI-single in the fifth inning and Shuichi Murata's solo homerun in the top of the eighth. In the bottom half of the inning, Giants' outfielder Yoshiyuki Kamei stopped a potential game-tying play by making an impressive catch at the wall to retire Kazuo Matsui with runners on first and second with two outs.

=== Game 2 ===
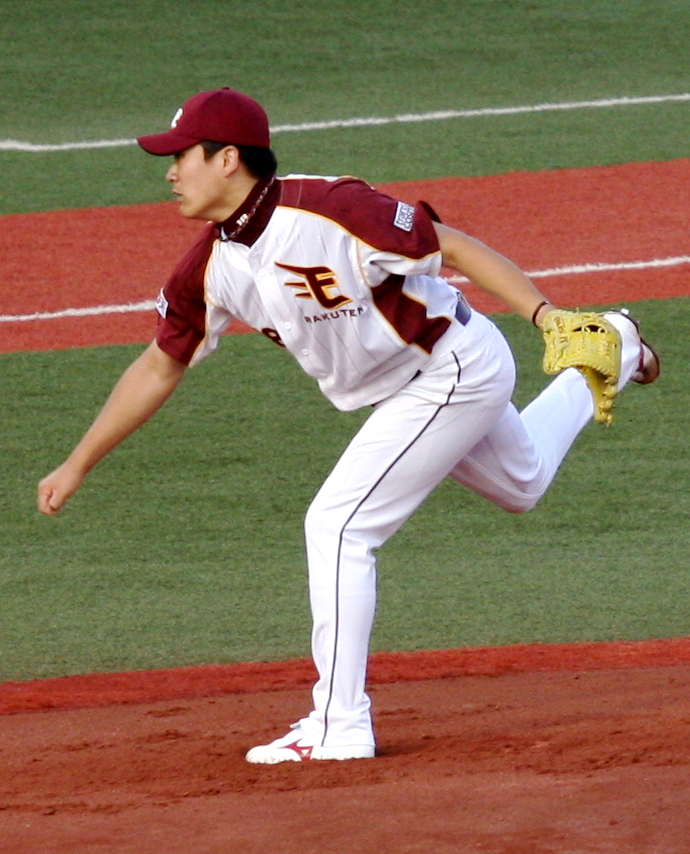
Eagles' pitcher Masahiro Tanaka struck out 12 in his complete game Game 2 victory.

Sunday, October 27, 2013, 6:33 pm (JST) at Nippon Paper Kleenex Stadium Miyagi in Sendai, Miyagi Prefecture
| Team | 1 | 2 | 3 | 4 | 5 | 6 | 7 | 8 | 9 | R | H | E |
|---|---|---|---|---|---|---|---|---|---|---|---|---|
| Yomiuri | 0 | 0 | 0 | 0 | 0 | 0 | 0 | 1 | 0 | 1 | 3 | 0 |
| Rakuten | 0 | 0 | 0 | 0 | 0 | 1 | 1 | 0 | X | 2 | 9 | 0 |
WP: Masahiro Tanaka (1–0) LP: Tomoyuki Sugano (0–1); Home runs: YOM: Takayuki Terauchi (1); RAK: None

Tying the Series at a game a piece, Eagle's ace Masahiro Tanaka earned a victory in Game 2 by striking out 12 in his complete game performance. The game's first run came with Ginji Akaminai's RBI single for the Eagles in the sixth inning. In the bottom of the next inning, with runners on first and third, Kazuya Fujita hit a ground ball to second base. Giants' second baseman Takayuki Terauchi fielded the ball and threw it to first base in an attempt to throw out a head-first-sliding Fujita. First base umpire Kenjiro Mori called Fujita safe, however replays showed that he should have been out as the ball reached the base first. Giants' manager Tatsunori Hara came onto the field to argue the call with Mori but the call stood. Mori's blown call was exaggerated when Terauchi hit what should have been a game-tying solo home run the next inning.

=== Game 3 ===
Tuesday, October 29, 2013, 6:18 pm (JST) at Tokyo Dome in Bunkyō, Tokyo
| Team | 1 | 2 | 3 | 4 | 5 | 6 | 7 | 8 | 9 | R | H | E |
|---|---|---|---|---|---|---|---|---|---|---|---|---|
| Rakuten | 0 | 4 | 0 | 0 | 0 | 0 | 0 | 1 | 0 | 5 | 13 | 1 |
| Yomiuri | 0 | 0 | 0 | 0 | 0 | 0 | 0 | 1 | 0 | 1 | 6 | 0 |
WP: Manabu Mima (1–0) LP: Toshiya Sugiuchi (0–1); Home runs: RAK: None; YOM: Kenji Yano (1)

After collecting only two runs on nine hits in each of the Series' first two games, the Eagles capitalized on 13 hits in Game 3 getting five runs and the victory. Giants' starter Toshiya Sugiuchi was removed from the game in only the second inning after giving up four runs. Eagles' starter Manabu Mima held the Giants to just four singles and no runs through 5 2/3 innings before leaving the game after being hit in the left foot with a ball hit by Shinnosuke Abe. Mima was relieved by Ken Ray, who pitched though the eighth inning and gave up the Giants' only run, a Kenji Yano leadoff, solo home run in the eighth inning.

=== Game 4 ===
Wednesday, October 30, 2013, 6:18 pm (JST) at Tokyo Dome in Bunkyō, Tokyo
| Team | 1 | 2 | 3 | 4 | 5 | 6 | 7 | 8 | 9 | R | H | E |
|---|---|---|---|---|---|---|---|---|---|---|---|---|
| Rakuten | 3 | 1 | 0 | 0 | 0 | 1 | 0 | 0 | 0 | 5 | 10 | 2 |
| Yomiuri | 1 | 0 | 0 | 2 | 2 | 0 | 1 | 0 | X | 6 | 7 | 0 |
WP: Scott Mathieson (1–0) LP: Kohei Hasebe (0–1) Sv: Tetsuya Yamaguchi (1); Home runs: RAK: Andruw Jones (1); YOM: None

=== Game 5 ===
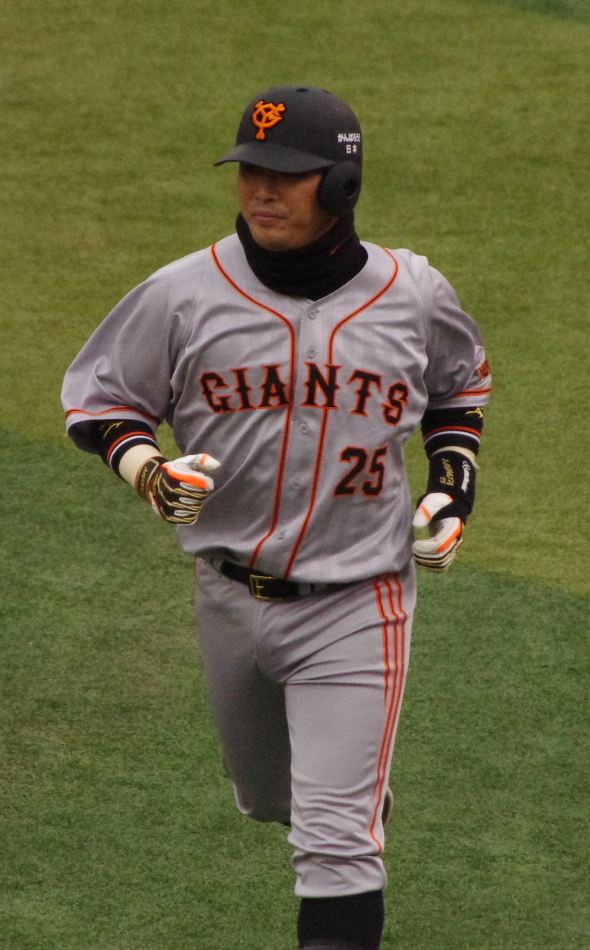
Shuichi Murata collected both of the Yomiuri Giants' RBIs in Game 5, including the game-tying RBI in the ninth inning.

Thursday, October 31, 2013, 6:17 pm (JST) at Tokyo Dome in Bunkyō, Tokyo
| Team | 1 | 2 | 3 | 4 | 5 | 6 | 7 | 8 | 9 | 10 | R | H | E |
|---|---|---|---|---|---|---|---|---|---|---|---|---|---|
| Rakuten | 0 | 0 | 2 | 0 | 0 | 0 | 0 | 0 | 0 | 2 | 4 | 10 | 0 |
| Yomiuri | 0 | 0 | 0 | 0 | 0 | 0 | 1 | 0 | 1 | 0 | 2 | 4 | 1 |
WP: Takahiro Norimoto (1–1) LP: Kentaro Nishimura (0–1); Home runs: RAK: None; YOM: Shuichi Murata (2)

After blowing a save in the ninth inning, the Eagles came back to win Game 5 in 10 innings. They led the majority of the game after scoring two runs off of Tetsuya Utsumi in the second. Rakuten starter Wataru Karashima and Takahiro Norimoto pitched five innings a piece. Karashima got through the first four innings without giving up a hit and allowed his first and only hit in the fifth inning. Relieving Karashima, Norimoto blew the game's save opportunity in the ninth only to earn a win in the tenth inning. Yomiuri's Shuichi Murata scored both of the Giants' runs off of Norimoto. His first RBI came from a solo home run in the seventh inning and his game-tying RBI hit came in the ninth sending the game into extra innings.

In the top of the tenth inning, Norimoto drew a lead off walk from Yomiuri reliever Kentaro Nishimura. He went on to reach second base on a sacrifice bunt by Takero Okajima. Next, Kazuya Fujita was hit in the calf with a pitch and took first base. Rakuten then took the lead with a single from Ginji Akaminai. On Akaminai's single, Fujita went from first to third but was then taken out and replaced by pinch runner Toshihito Abe. Abe then scored on Andruw Jones' infield single giving the Eagles an insurance run. Norimoto pitched a hitless bottom half of the inning to win the game.

=== Game 6 ===
Saturday, November 2, 2013, 6:35 pm (JST) at Nippon Paper Kleenex Stadium Miyagi in Sendai, Miyagi Prefecture
| Team | 1 | 2 | 3 | 4 | 5 | 6 | 7 | 8 | 9 | R | H | E |
|---|---|---|---|---|---|---|---|---|---|---|---|---|
| Yomiuri | 0 | 0 | 0 | 0 | 3 | 1 | 0 | 0 | 0 | 4 | 12 | 2 |
| Rakuten | 0 | 2 | 0 | 0 | 0 | 0 | 0 | 0 | 0 | 2 | 3 | 1 |
WP: Tomoyuki Sugano (1–1) LP: Masahiro Tanaka (1–1) Sv: Scott Mathieson (1); Home runs: YOM: José López (1); RAK: None

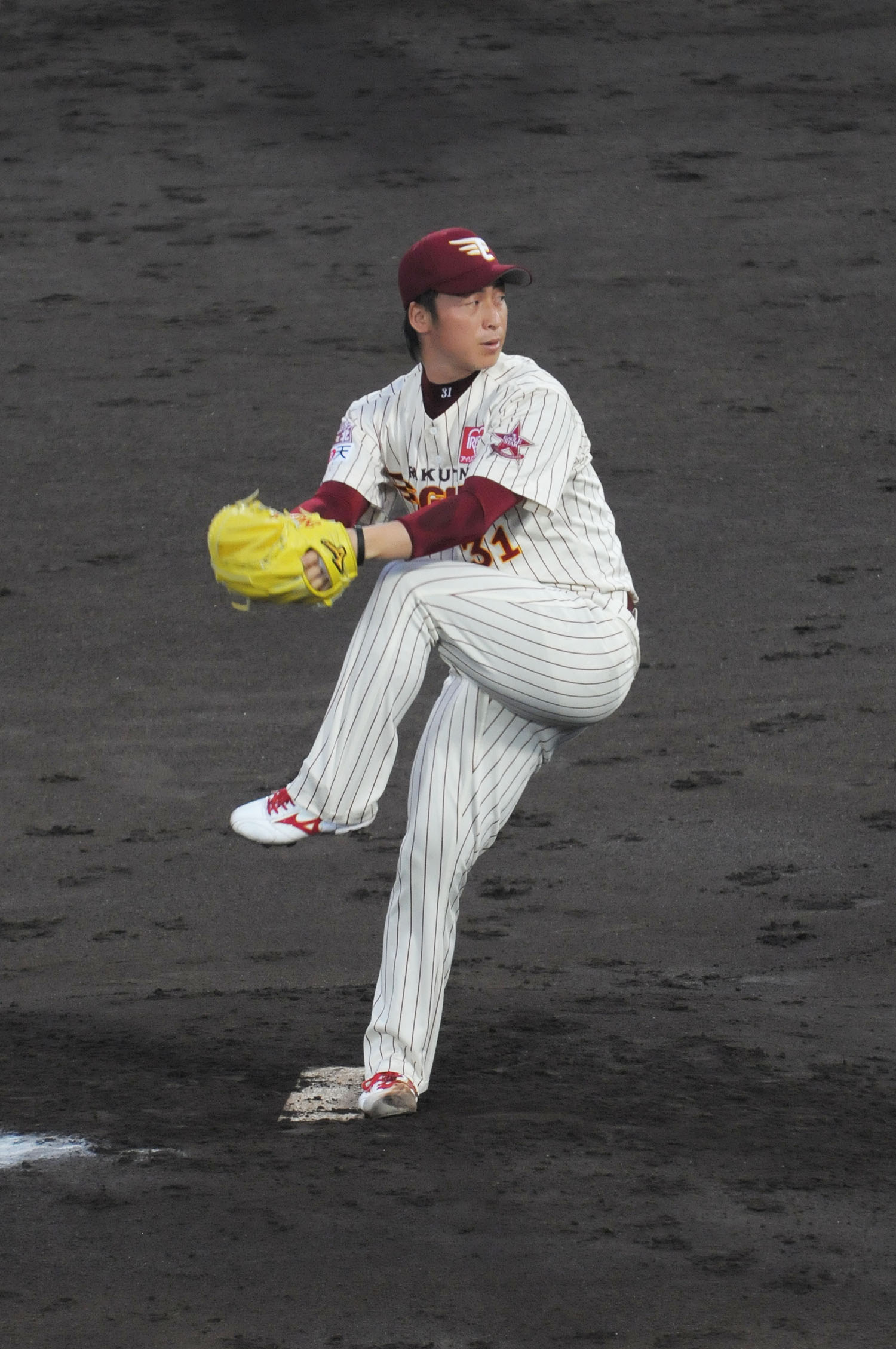
Tohoku Rakuten Golden Eagles' starting pitcher Manabu Mima was named the Japan Series Most Valuable Player after his Game 7 win.

=== Game 7 ===
Sunday, November 3, 2013, 6:35 pm (JST) at Nippon Paper Kleenex Stadium Miyagi in Sendai, Miyagi Prefecture
| Team | 1 | 2 | 3 | 4 | 5 | 6 | 7 | 8 | 9 | R | H | E |
|---|---|---|---|---|---|---|---|---|---|---|---|---|
| Yomiuri | 0 | 0 | 0 | 0 | 0 | 0 | 0 | 0 | 0 | 0 | 5 | 1 |
| Rakuten | 1 | 1 | 0 | 1 | 0 | 0 | 0 | 0 | X | 3 | 8 | 1 |
WP: Manabu Mima (2–0) LP: Toshiya Sugiuchi (0-2) Sv: Masahiro Tanaka (1); Home runs: YOM: None; RAK: Akihisa Makida (1)

Rakuten brought home their first Japan Series win after their Game 7 home win over the Giants. Eagles' starter Mima pitched for six innings and gave up only one hit, struck out five and walked three. Norimoto then relieved Mima to pitch two scoreless innings, and Tanaka came in to close out the ninth earning him a save. Tanaka's one-inning save came the day after he pitched a 160-pitch complete game loss. The Giants' offensive problems throughout the series hurt them again in Game 7 where they hit only 5 singles and were shutout. The Eagles immediately took the lead in the first inning on a run-scoring error by Giants' shortstop Hayato Sakamoto. The following inning, they added to their lead with Takero Okajima’s RBI-double. The final insurance run came with Akihisa Makida's solo home run in the fourth inning.

== See also ==
- 2013 Korean Series
- 2013 World Series
