= Tohoku Rakuten Golden Eagles =

Baseball team in Sendai, Miyagi Prefecture, Japan

- 東北楽天ゴールデンイーグルス

Logo	Cap insignia

Information
- League: Nippon Professional Baseball Pacific League (2005–present)
- Location: Miyagino-ku, Sendai, Miyagi, Japan
- Ballpark: Rakuten Mobile Saikyo Park Miyagi
- Founded: November 2, 2004; 21 years ago
- Nickname(s): Inuwashi (イヌワシ, golden eagles)
- Japan Series championships: 1 (2013)
- PL pennants: 1 (2013)
- Playoff berths: 5 (2009, 2013, 2017, 2019, 2021)
- Colors: Crimson, White, Yellow
- Mascot: Clutch, Clutchena, and Switch
- Retired numbers: 10; 77
- Ownership: Hiroshi Mikitani
- Management: Rakuten Baseball, Inc.
- President: Masayuki Morii
- General manager: Masato Yoshii (acting)
- Manager: Masato Yoshii
- Website: rakuteneagles.jp

Current uniforms

The Tohoku Rakuten Golden Eagles (東北楽天ゴールデンイーグルス, Tōhoku Rakuten Gōruden Īgurusu), often shortened as the Rakuten Eagles (楽天イーグルス, Rakuten Īgurusu), are a baseball team based in Sendai, Miyagi Prefecture, Japan. It has played in Nippon Professional Baseball's Pacific League since the team's formation in November 2004. The team is owned by the Internet shopping company Rakuten.

Through 2026, the franchise's all-time record is 1,412–1,620–85 (.466). The team's acting manager is Masato Yoshii.

== History ==
=== 2004: Origins and formation ===
During Nippon Professional Baseball's (NPB) 2004 season, the Osaka Kintetsu Buffaloes and the Orix BlueWave announced that the two teams planned to merge into one for the start of the 2005 season. Both teams were in the Pacific League (PL), and a merger between the two would result in a team imbalance with the PL's opposing league, the Central League (CL). As a large number of players and personnel were expected to lose their jobs when the merger was finalized, the players conducted a two-day strike on September 18–19, 2004. With the threat of further strikes looming, team representatives agreed to ease the rules of entry for new teams into NPB and that one would be allowed to join the following season. To fill the void left by the merger, internet services companies Livedoor and Rakuten submitted applications to form teams to be based in Sendai, Miyagi Prefecture. NPB selected Rakuten to create a Sendai-based PL team. The team would play its home games in Miyagi Baseball Stadium, which was being renovated by Rakuten. Marty Kuehnert and Yasushi Tao were hired as general manager and manager, respectively, of their newly named "Tohoku Rakuten Golden Eagles" baseball club. The name is derived from the Japanese golden eagle, a large, endangered, predatory bird found in the mountains of Japan's Tōhoku region, and it is the only NPB team that includes the name of an entire Japanese region rather than only a prefecture or city.

Instead of allowing the Eagles to draft players from all 11 NPB teams in an expansion draft, the team had to construct their roster from the 107 players left over from the dissolved Kintetsu and original Orix teams during a special dispersal draft. Orix was allowed to protect 25 players from the distribution process before the draft, thus giving them preferential signing rights. Included in these selections were all free agents and foreign players. Rakuten was then allowed to select 20 unprotected players, not including any first- or second-year players. After that, the first- and second-year players were unprotected and Orix and Rakuten alternated selecting 20 more players for the last round of the draft. The league's decision to employ an unequal dispersal draft to build the Eagles roster was blamed for the team's struggles to come. Rakuten was able to select former Buffaloes outfielder Koichi Isobe because he was left unprotected by Orix after refusing to play for their newly formed team. Similarly, the Eagles were able to acquire Buffaloes star pitcher Hisashi Iwakuma. Despite voicing that he had no intention of playing for the merged team, Orix still protected him. After, negotiations took place between Iwakuma and Orix that resulted in Orix trading him to the Eagles.

=== 2005–2009: Debut and the road to the Climax Series ===
Just over a month into their first season, the Eagles removed Kuehnert as general manager and demoted the head and batting coaches following a 6–22 start. The team finished 51.5 games out of first place and was the first NPB team in 40 years to lose over 90 games in a single season. As a result, ten players were released, and Tao was dismissed despite being signed to a three-year contract. In an otherwise disastrous season, one highlight was the team's home debut. Only five months after being awarded a franchise and without a preseason game as a dry run, Rakuten ran and operated the game smoothly in front of a packed, partially-renovated Miyagi Stadium. It was also estimated that the economic impact of the team in the Tōhoku region was $300 million in the first year. Rakuten planned to spend more than ¥1 billion on enhancing player training and about ¥3 billion on the continuing remodel of the ballpark. The stadium's off-season renovations expanded its seating capacity and added amenities. Mikitani looked to experience to lead the Eagles in its second season when he replaced first-time manager Tao with Hall of Famer and veteran manager Katsuya Nomura, signing him to a three-year contract. The team improved slightly over its first season, and third baseman José Fernández went on to receive the Eagles' first Best Nine Award in his first season with the team. However, the 2006 season also brought the Eagles' their first no-hit loss, and they still finished last in the Pacific League. At the end of the season, Rakuten drafted pitcher Masahiro Tanaka in the first round of the 2006 amateur high school draft.

The Eagles' first real signs of improvement came during the 2007 season, the team's third. Takeshi Yamasaki led the league in home runs through May and was named the PL MVP for the month of May, the team's first. He went on to be selected by fans to the Pacific League All-Star team for the 2007 All-Star Series, receiving the most votes of any player overall. With one of the All-Star games being played at the Eagles' home stadium that year, fans also voted in seven other Rakuten players, including rookie pitcher Tanaka. Rakuten finished the season with a losing record, however, for the first time they did not finish the season in last, instead finishing in fourth. At the end of the season, Yamasaki led the league in both home runs and runs batted in (RBIs) and Tanaka was awarded the PL Rookie of the Year Award. The team finished fifth next season, however, Iwakuma finished with the best earned run average (ERA) and most wins in the league after struck by injuries the previous few years. At season's end, he was presented with his and the team's first PL Most Valuable Player (MVP) and Eiji Sawamura Awards. In the 2008–09 offseason, the Eagles extended Nomura's contract to keep him on as manager for one more year. Rakuten secured second place in the Pacific League the next season and advanced to the Climax Series for the first time. A pair of complete game wins at home both by Iwakuma and Tanaka in the first stage allowed the Eagles to advance but the team lost to the Hokkaido Nippon-Ham Fighters in four games in the second stage, ending their season.

=== 2010–2013: From disaster to championship ===
Rakuten hired American Marty Brown to succeed Nomura as manager. Even though Brown was signed to a two-year contract, he was let go a year later after the Eagles finished the 2010 season in last place. The club looked to Senichi Hoshino next to turn the team around. Kazuo Matsui and Akinori Iwamura, both returning from playing stints in Major League Baseball (MLB), were also added to the roster, and Teppei Tsuchiya was named as the team's first ever captain. On March 11, 2011, two weeks before the first game of the season, the Tōhoku region was struck by the largest earthquake in the country's history. The quake and the subsequent tsunami devastated the region, including the Eagles' home city of Sendai. With the season opener postponed until April 12, the team continued to train in the Kansai region because of the aftermath in Sendai. In addition to Rakuten holding fund-raising events, all 12 teams played charity games to help raise money for earthquake relief. They hosted their first "home" game at Koshien Stadium while restoration work to Miyagi Stadium continued. Baseball returned to Sendai on April 12, when the Eagles played their first game at their home field. Furthermore, the final game of the 2011 All-Star Series was switched from Tokyo Dome to Miyagi Stadium, the second time the Eagles hosted the event since 2007. Rakuten finished the 2011 season in fifth and again missed the playoffs. However, in addition to winning a Golden Glove and a Best Nine award, Tanaka was also named PL MVP of the month three times over the course of the season, a first for the Pacific League.

After the season, Hisashi Iwakuma left the club to play in MLB. Rakuten went deep into the 2012 season as a playoff contender that year, but ultimately missed advancing to the Climax Series by one game and finished fourth. Before the start of the 2013 season, the Eagles signed former MLB players Casey McGehee and Andruw Jones. The Eagles finished April in fifth place, however, the next two months saw Tanaka winning consecutive PL MVP of the month awards, helping the club to finish June in second. The team took sole possession of first place in the Pacific League in early July and never relinquished it, winning the Eagles' their first PL pennant. Over the remaining three months of the season, Tanaka continued to win games and finished the season with 24 wins and no losses. He was awarded a record-setting five consecutive monthly MVPs from May to September. As league champions, the Eagles advanced directly to the final stage of the Climax Series Final where they defeated the Chiba Lotte Marines to advance to their first Japan Series. Rakuten defeated the Yomiuri Giants at home in the final game of a seven-game series to win the franchise's first and only Japan Series championship. Game 6 of that Japan Series would also mark the only loss, including postseason games, that Tanaka would be given, after pitching a 160 pitch complete game in Game 6, but he followed it up in what would be his final game before being posted to the Yankees, a save in Game 7. Starting pitcher Manabu Mima was named the Japan Series MVP after the series, and at the end of the season, Tanaka was presented with the PL MVP and Eiji Sawamura Awards, Norimoto was named the PL Rookie of the Year, and Senichi Hoshino was given the Matsutaro Shoriki Award. After the increased ticket demand during the 2013 season, an expansion project that increased Miyagi Stadium's maximum seating capacity above 28,000 was completed the next year.

=== 2014–2017: Post-Tanaka struggles ===
Following the championship-winning season, Masahiro Tanaka left the Eagles via the posting system to play for the New York Yankees, netting the team a $20 million transfer fee in return. Likewise, McGehee also left for MLB, and the team struggled in the years following their departures, finishing last the next season. This disappointing finish prompted manager Senichi Hoshino to resign despite ownership wanting him to return for a fifth season. Rakuten promoted their farm team manager Hiromoto Okubo to manager. At the end of July, hitting coach Tomio Tashiro abruptly resigned and it was revealed that owner Hiroshi Mikitani had often been interfering in on-the-field decisions, such as dictating the batting order. After Tashiro's resignation, Mikitani began conferring with field personnel before making any decisions, however the team again finished in last and Okubo resigned at the end of the season. The turmoil brought about by Mikitani taking the lead on baseball operations after Hoshino's unexpected resignation forced Rakuten to reevaluate how the team was managed and organized. It was decided that Hoshino, who had been retained as an Eagles vice chairman, would have full authority over baseball operations, similar to the role of an MLB general manager.

In preparation for the 2016 season, Miyagi Stadium underwent its last major renovation during the offseason, increasing its capacity to over 30,000 people. The team, hoping to avoid a third consecutive last-place finish, hired veteran PL manager Masataka Nashida and signed free agent Toshiaki Imae, a two-time Japan Series MVP. During the season, Rakuten formed a training team to help further develop talent by playing against university, corporate, club, and independent teams. The Eagles avoided finishing the season in last, however they placed fifth and again missed the playoffs. The 2017 Eagles, however, found themselves battling the Saitama Seibu Lions near the end of the season for second place. Ultimately, the team secured a first stage Climax Series berth against the Lions with a third-place finish. After losing the first game of the three-game series, Rakuten won the final two to defeat Seibu and advance to the final stage. Against the Fukuoka SoftBank Hawks, the Eagles took the first two games of the series but were eliminated after the Hawks won the next three.

=== 2018–present: Ishii as general manager and Tanaka returns ===
Hoshino died in January 2018. Following the death, Rakuten erected a memorial flower stand in front of the newly named Rakuten Seimei Park Miyagi. Mikitani then announced that Hoshino's uniform number 77 would be retired permanently just before the start of the season. The Eagles struggled immediately that season, falling to 20 games under .500 by mid-June. Taking responsibility for the team's poor performance, Nashida resigned as manager that month and head coach Yosuke Hiraishi acted as interim manager for the remainder of the season. The Eagles went on to finish the season in last, however before it was over Rakuten formally created a general manager (GM) position in Hoshino's absence. Former NPB and MLB pitcher Kazuhisa Ishii was hired in the role to help coordinate the efforts of the front office and field management.

Hiraishi was kept on as full-time manager for the 2019 season and led the Eagles to a third-place finish and a postseason berth. However, the team was defeated by the Hawks in the first stage. After the loss, another managerial change was made and Hajime Miki was promoted from farm team manager. The Eagles failed to make the playoffs in the pandemic-shortened 2020 season, and Ishii sent Miki back to manage the farm team after only one season. To replace him, Ishii appointed himself as manager starting with the 2021 season. Meanwhile, the conclusion of MLB's 2020 season marked the end of Masahiro Tanaka's seven-year contract with the Yankees. Instead of signing with another MLB team, Tanaka chose to return to play in Japan and signed a two-year contract with Rakuten. The next season, a third-place finish secured the Eagles a place in the 2021 PL Climax Series, however a loss and a tie against the Marines ensured that Rakuten would not advance to the final stage.

== Roster ==
Tohoku Rakuten Golden Eagles roster
First team		Second team
Pitchers: 13 Sōta Fujiwara; 18 Kenta Maeda; 19 Kōsei Shōji; 20 Tatsuki Itoh; 21 Takahisa Hayakawa; 22 José Ureña; 23 Yunior Marte; 41 Ren Kajiya; 45 Ryu Kutani; 46 Shōma Fujihira; 49 Masaya Nishigaki; 59 Katsutoshi Tai; 62 Naoto Nishiguchi; Catchers: 2 Hikaru Ohta; 44 Takaya Tanaka; 55 YG Yasuda; 65 Kengo Horiuchi	Infielders: 0 Hiroto Kobukata; 1 Rui Muneyama; 6 Itsuki Murabayashi; 24 Fumiya Kurokawa; 30 Akira Shigenaga; 35 Yoshiaki Watanabe; 48 Ryūya Taira; 73 Kohtarō Komori; Outfielders: 8 Ryōsuke Tatsumi; 32 Daisuke Nakashima; 34 Carson McCusker; 42 Shoya Sakaue; 51 Yūya Ogoh; Manager: 81 Masato Yoshii; Coaches: 86 Tatsuya Shiokawa (Head); 89 Hiroshi Watanabe (Batting); 76 Tatsuya Shimozono (Batting); 84 Yūhei (Batting); 94 Katsumi Yamashita (Batting); 91 Yūya Kubo (Pitching); 80 Takashi Ishii (Pitching); 92 Chikara Onodera (Pitching); 81 Kōji Aoyama (Pitching); 96 Takahiro Shiomi (Pitching); 93 Suguru Ino (Battery); 97 Takahiro Shimotsuma (Battery); 95 Ryōsuke Morioka (Infield defense/base running); 83 Masato Watanabe (Infield defense/base running); 99 Shinichi Kawana (Outfield defense/base running); 85 Akihisa Makida (Outfield defense/base running)	Pitchers: 11 Takayuki Kishi; 15 Roansy Contreras; 17 Tatsuki Koja; 26 Haruto Nakagomi; 28 Tomohito Sakai; 29 Chiharu Tanaka; 31 Shōta Watanabe; 40 Masahiro Ehara; 43 Sung Chia-hao; 47 Masaru Fujii; 52 Taisei Tsurusaki; 53 Haruto Sakai; 54 Naoki Hinata; 56 Sora Suzuki; 57 Ryōta Takinaka; 58 Wataru Karashima; 61 Kōsei Koga; 64 Yūki Hayashi; 66 Ryuta Konno; 67 Seiya Ohuchi; 69 Seiryū Uchi; 71 Daichi Shibata; 79 Taisei Itoh; Catchers: 27 Hikaru Itoh; 70 Tsuyoshi Ishihara; 72 Toshiya Ohsakae	Infielders: 3 Hideto Asamura; 7 Daichi Suzuki; 9 Luke Voit; 39 Yukiya Itoh; 60 Waters; 63 Daiki Irie; 68 Takumi Aono; 75 Yang Po-hsiang; 98 Kyōsuke Kaneko; Outfielders: 25 Kazuki Tanaka; 36 Tsubasa Yoshinoh; 38 Naoki Satō; 50 Atsuki Mutoh; 78 Sōshi Yoshino; Manager: 74 Naoto Watanabe; Coaches: 87 Yasunaga Makishi (General development); 90 Fumitoshi Takano (Development)
Development Players
029 Kazuto Tokuyama (P); 061 Takuma Matsuda (P); 130 Yonawil Florimon (P); 133 Takuma Nakazawa (P); 197 Hsiao Chi (P); 022 Kei Mizukami (C); 122 Taiga Shimahara (C); 132 Yūya Kishimoto (IF); 079 Ginji Maeda (OF); 126 Daita Horomura (OF); 129 Shion Ohtsubo (OF)
Updated October 5, 2026		→ All NPB rosters

=== MLB players ===
Active:

- Yuki Matsui (2024–present)

Former:

- Masahiro Tanaka (2014–2020)

Retired:

- Kazuo Fukumori (2008)
- Hisashi Iwakuma (2012–2017)

== Honors and records ==
=== Honors ===
Japan Series Championship (1): 2013

=== Retired numbers ===
- 10 – Rakuten announced on December 4, 2004, during the early stages of the team's formation, that the uniform number 10 would be retired prior to the Eagles' first season. The number represents Eagles fans and signifies them as the team's 10th member following its nine starting fielders. It has never been worn by an Eagles manager, coach, or player, however, the team's mascot Clutch wears the number on his uniform and acts as the fans' representative.
- 77 – Following Senichi Hoshino's death in early 2018, Rakuten announced on March 26 they would be retiring his uniform number 77. Hoshino managed the Eagles for four season from 2011 to 2014, including during their only Japan Series win in 2013, and stayed with the team as a vice-chairman after his retirement until his death. This number is also the only manager uniform number to be retired in NPB. (Note: Sadaharu Oh's managerial number of 89, although not fully retired by the Fukuoka SoftBank Hawks for which he managed from 1995 to 2008, is honored by that organization.) Other players that went on to manage and subsequently had their numbers retired retained the same uniform number throughout their playing and managerial careers. Hoshino, however, changed his uniform number to 77 when he first started managing the Chunichi Dragons and retained that number throughout his managerial career with the Hanshin Tigers and later the Eagles.

=== Records ===
Tohoku Rakuten Golden Eagles
Year	Manager	Games	Wins	Losses	Ties	Pct.	GB	BA	ERA	Finish	Postseason
2005	Yasushi Tao	136	38	97	1	.281	51.5	.255	5.67	6th, Pacific	Did not qualify
2006	Katsuya Nomura	136	47	85	4	.356	33.0	.258	4.30	6th, Pacific	Did not qualify
2007	Katsuya Nomura	144	67	75	2	.472	13.5	.262	4.31	4th, Pacific	Did not qualify
2008	Katsuya Nomura	144	65	76	3	.461	11.5	.272	3.89	5th, Pacific	Did not qualify
2009	Katsuya Nomura	144	77	66	1	.538	5.5	.267	4.01	2nd, Pacific	Lost in second stage, 1–4 (Fighters)
2010	Marty Brown	144	62	79	3	.440	15.0	.265	3.98	6th, Pacific	Did not qualify
2011	Senichi Hoshino	144	66	71	7	.482	22.5	.245	2.85	5th, Pacific	Did not qualify
2012	Senichi Hoshino	144	67	67	10	.500	7.5	.252	2.99	4th, Pacific	Did not qualify
2013	Senichi Hoshino	144	82	59	3	.582	-	.267	3.51	1st, Pacific	Nippon Series champions, 4–3 (Giants)
2014	Senichi Hoshino	144	64	80	0	.444	17.0	.255	3.97	6th, Pacific	Did not qualify
2015	Hiromoto Okubo	143	57	83	3	.407	33.5	.241	3.82	6th, Pacific	Did not qualify
2016	Masataka Nashida	143	62	78	3	.443	25.0	.257	4.11	5th, Pacific	Did not qualify
2017	Masataka Nashida	143	77	63	3	.550	29.5	.254	3.33	3rd, Pacific	Lost in final stage, 2–4 (Hawks)
2018	Masataka Nashida; Yosuke Hiraishi	143	58	82	3	.414	15.0	.241	3.78	6th, Pacific	Did not qualify
2019	Yosuke Hiraishi	143	71	68	4	.511	15.0	.251	3.74	3rd, Pacific	Lost in first stage, 1–2 (Hawks)
2020	Hajime Miki	120	55	57	3	.491	16.5	.258	4.19	4th, Pacific	Did not qualify
2021	Kazuhisa Ishii	143	66	62	15	.516	5.5	.243	3.40	4th, Pacific	Lost in first stage, 1–1–2 (Marines)
2022	Kazuhisa Ishii	143	69	71	3	.491	6.5	.243	3.47	4th, Pacific	Did not qualify
2023	Kazuhisa Ishii	143	70	71	2	.496	17.0	.244	3.52	4th, Pacific	Did not qualify
Total	--	2545	1150	1319	76	.460	–	–	–	–	-

== Team identity ==
=== Logos and uniforms ===
The Eagles' team color is crimson red, the corporate color of its parent company, Rakuten. Yellow was added as an accent color to represent a golden eagle. The team's logo applies a golden eagle motif to the word "Eagles", which has wings added to its left and right sides. The word "Rakuten" sits at atop in a smaller, simpler font. The winged "E" from this logo also serves as the team's cap insignia. The club's home and away uniforms both include the same crimson caps bearing this insignia. Starting with the 2020 season, '47 supplies the caps for the team. Their glossy helmets mimic the cap design and are created using a traditional Miyagi Prefecture lacquer technique called tamamushi-nuri. The supplier of Rakuten's uniforms has changed several times. At the start of the 2011 season, Descente provided all of the team's uniforms and apparel. Then, from 2014 to 2019, the team had a contract with Majestic Athletic, the then-supplier of MLB. Since the start of the 2020 season, Mizuno Corporation has supplied the uniforms and apparel for the Eagles. The Eagles' uniforms bear the logos of various sponsors on the jersey, pants, cap, and helmet.

==== Home and visitor uniforms ====
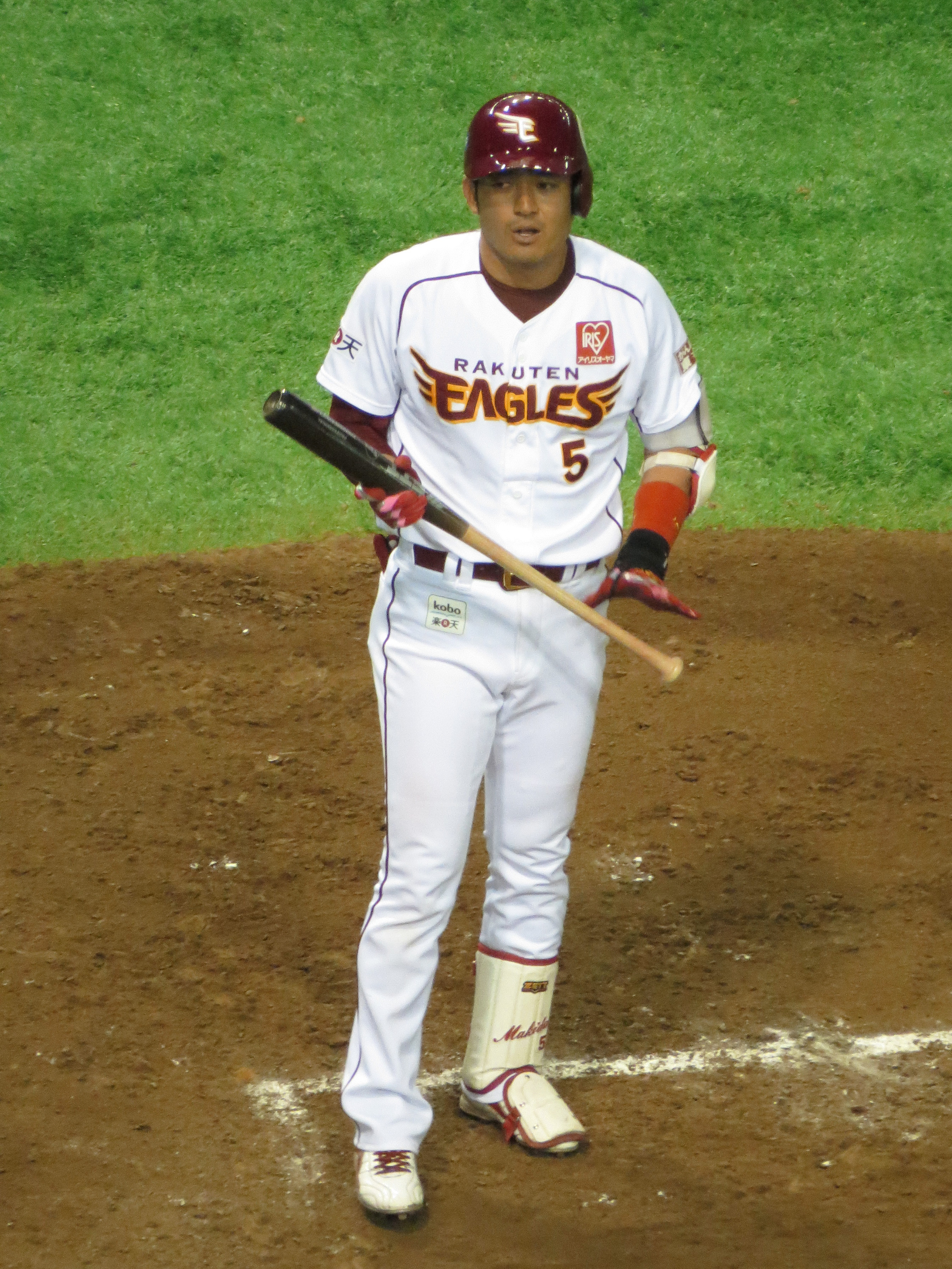
Home uniform, 2014

The Eagles home uniforms are all white. The pants are white with crimson piping from beltline to cuff on each side and have not changed since being introduced. For the team's inaugural season, the front of the white, button-down jersey displayed the team's logo along with the player's number in crimson outlined in yellow. The raglan lines on the shoulders and sides featured crimson piping, and the back displayed the player's name and number in the same style as the front number. The right sleeve displayed Rakuten's corporate logo. The jersey underwent a small design change for the 2011 season when the fonts for the player's name and numbers were simplified to match the font on the visitor jersey. Then, after the Tōhoku earthquake, a patch reading "Ganbaro Tōhoku" (がんばろう東北, 'Let's do this, Tōhoku') was added to the left sleeve as a symbol of support. This patch has been featured on every home and visitor uniform since it was first added. Before the 2018 season, the home jersey design was again tweaked. All of the yellow was changed to gold, including the chest logo, its first change. Additionally, the raglan and side piping was removed in favor of crimson and gold stripes around the collar and sleeves and the font of the player's name and numbers was again modified. The club's current home jersey debuted before the 2020 season and is very similar to its previous iteration, albeit with the crimson and gold collar stripes removed.

Visitor uniforms

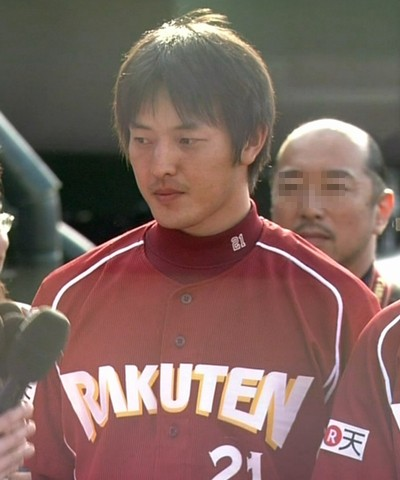
Debut jersey, 2008

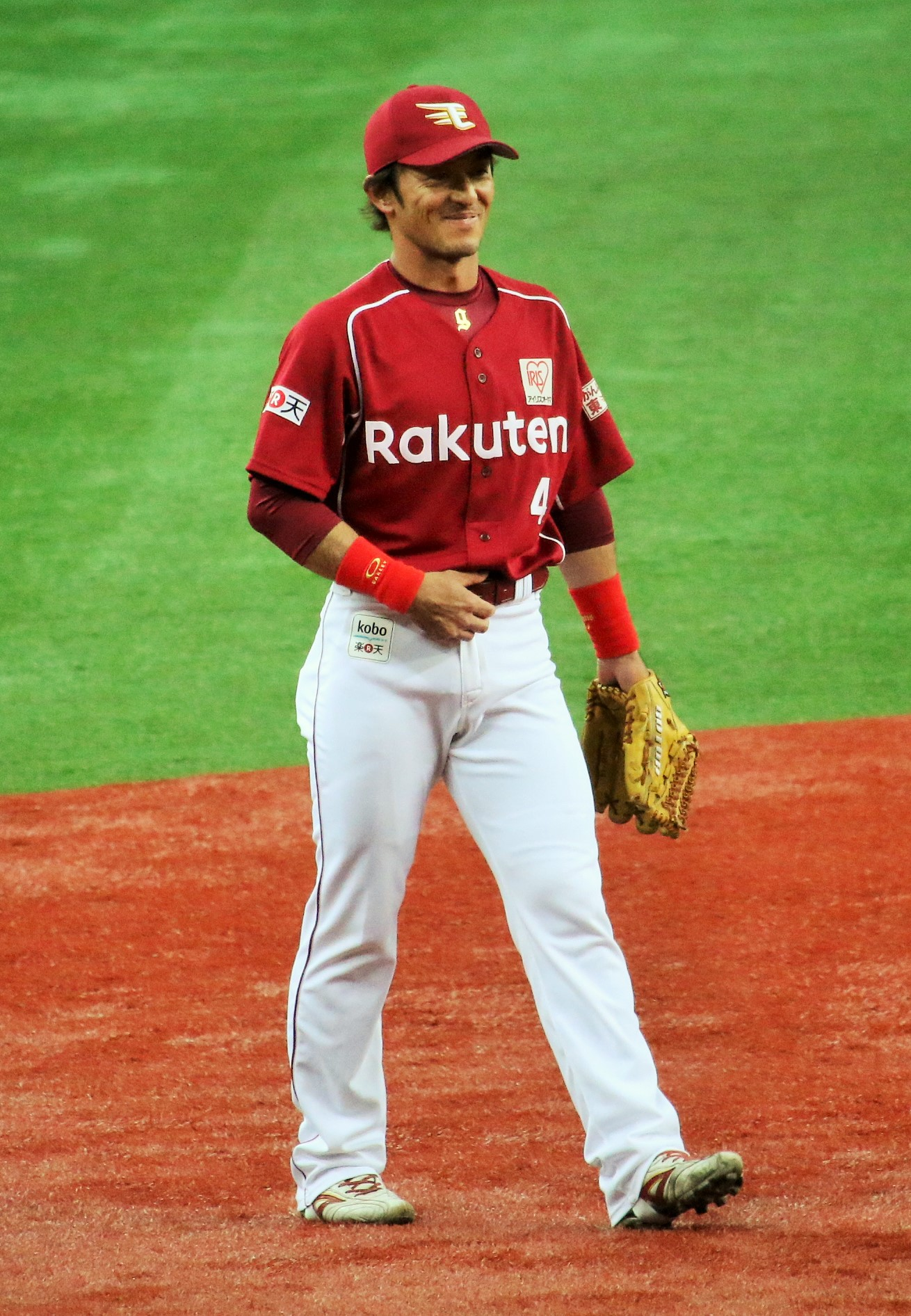
Second design, 2014

The team's visitor uniform has undergone more drastic changes since the first design. The same pants worn with the home jerseys are utilized for the visitor uniforms, however the button-down jersey is crimson red and bears the name of the team's owner "Rakuten" on the chest. In the garment's first iteration, the white Rakuten logo was wholly original and incorporated a yellow drop shadow to give it a 3D effect. White piping along the raglan lines on the shoulders and sides was added and the player's number in white appeared on the front. The back displayed the player's name and number, again in white. As with the home jerseys, the right sleeve displayed Rakuten's corporate logo. Its first design change came one year before the home jersey's when the chest logo was changed in 2009. All yellow was removed leaving the logo completely white, and the font was changed to bring it in line with Rakuten's corporate branding. Additionally, the font of the name and numbers was simplified. The font used for the name and numbers was again modified for the 2014 season. The next change to the visitor jersey occurred in 2018, the same time as the home design change. Again keeping with the changes to the corporate logo, a white line was added under "Rakuten" on the chest. The raglan and side piping was also removed in favor of white stripes around the collar and sleeves. The Eagles' current visitor jersey again debuted alongside the home jersey. Similarly, the stripes around the collar were removed, however a gold stripe was added to the white stripes around the sleeves. Gold outlines were also added to the back name and number and the front chest number was removed for the first time.

==== Third and special uniforms ====
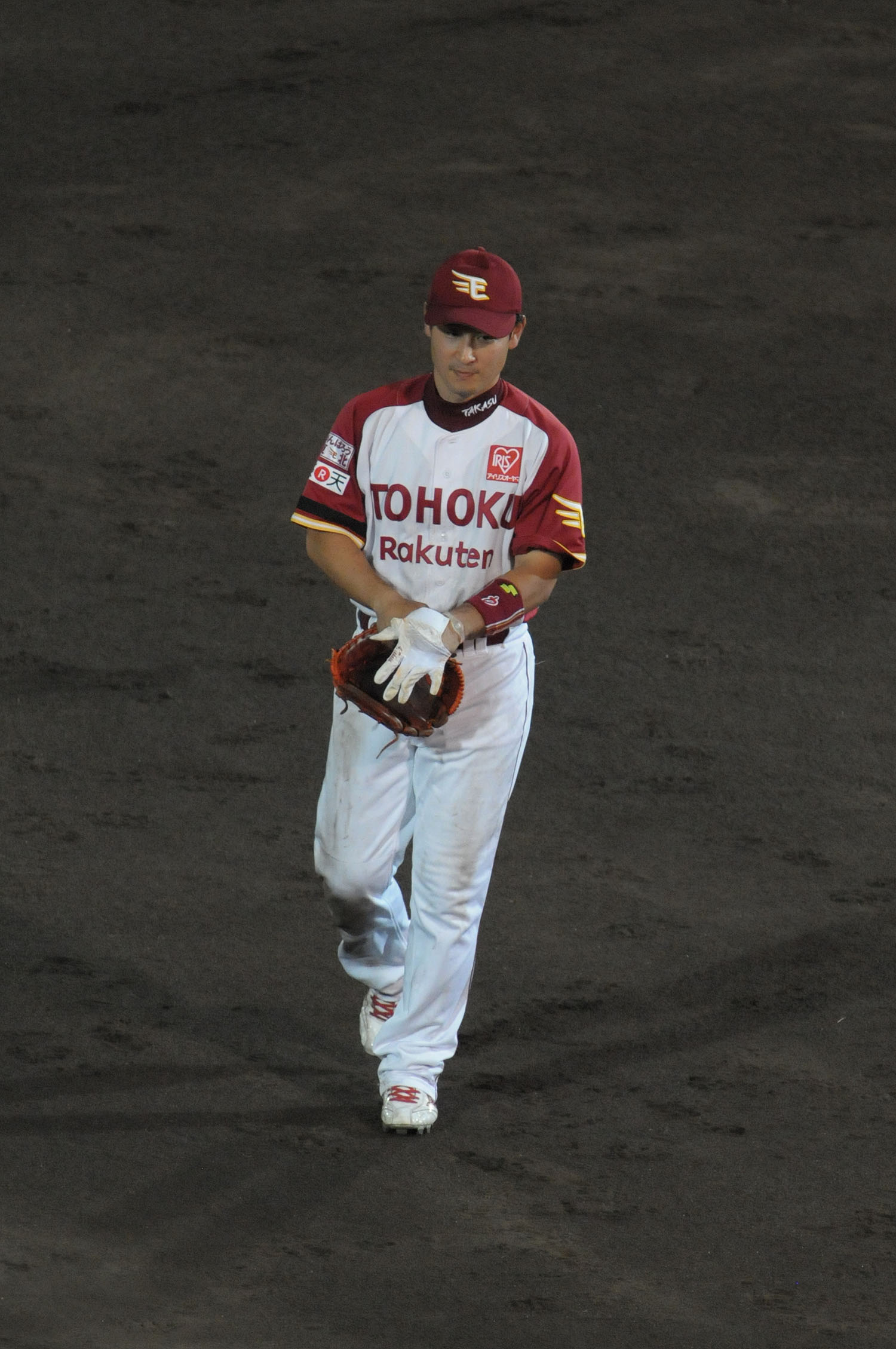
Third uniform, 2011

Throughout the team's history, there have also been several alternate and limited-time uniform designs. A third alternate uniform was introduced in 2006 for home games during interleague play. These were primarily white with crimson sides and shoulders outlined by yellow piping along the raglan lines. The left side of the chest featured the cap emblem, while the right featured the player's number in crimson outlined in yellow. It was redesigned for the 2010 and 2011 seasons and worn at several games played in the Tōhoku region before being discontinued. The chest displayed the words "Tohoku" and "Rakuten" in crimson, with the "E" logo moved instead to the sleeve and the player's chest number removed altogether. The yellow piping was removed in favor of yellow and white stripes around the sleeve cuff.

Other than the third alternate uniform, the Eagles have also worn many limited, seasonal uniforms throughout their history that often have unique designs, colors, and sleeve patches. Starting with the 2007 season, players wore special uniforms during a limited, home-game stretch dubbed "Fan Club Day". From 2007 to 2009, each season's uniform was selected from a pool of fan-submitted designs and were variants of their white, home jersey. After skipping the 2010 season, the event returned in 2011, however the design contest was no longer employed. In an effort to fill the stands with color for the event, the jersey was changed to crimson, a color traditionally used only for road games, for 2012 and 2013. In 2014, these jerseys were rebranded as the "Fans'" uniform and were worn for home games played throughout the Tōhoku region. To reflect this, the Eagles' chest logo was removed from the crimson jersey and instead replaced with the word "Tohoku". A patch was also added to the sleeve that season to commemorate the team's 2013 Japan Series win. This general design continued to be utilized for Fans' Days through the 2018 season. For the 2019 season, Rakuten's fifteenth, the Fans' uniform was changed and again borrowed the home jersey design, however in grey instead of white. The next year, the same design was kept but the base color was changed to black, and it would be worn again in 2021 after the COVID pandemic limited fan attendance in 2020.

Special uniforms

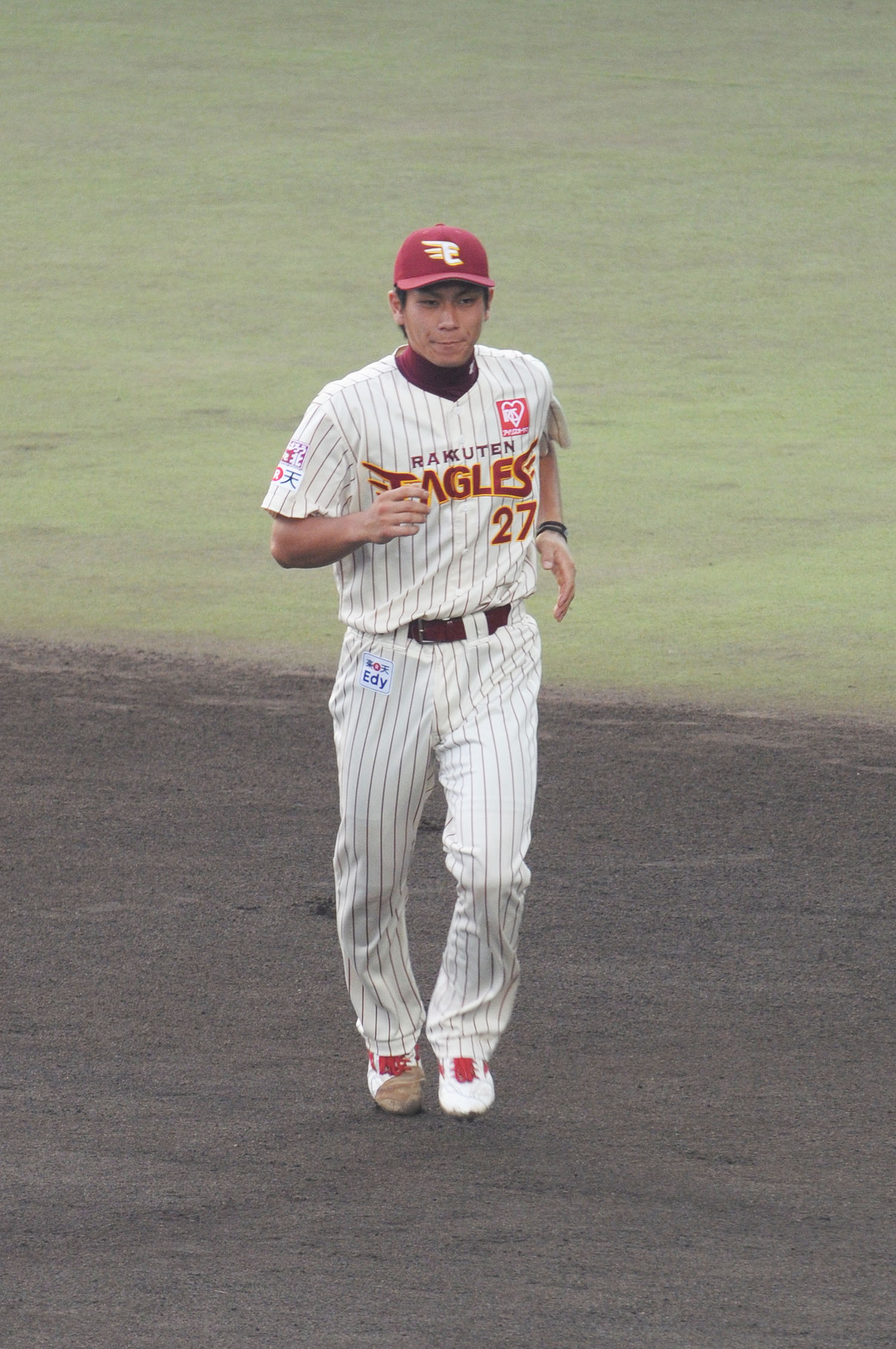
"Eagle Star" uniform, 2012

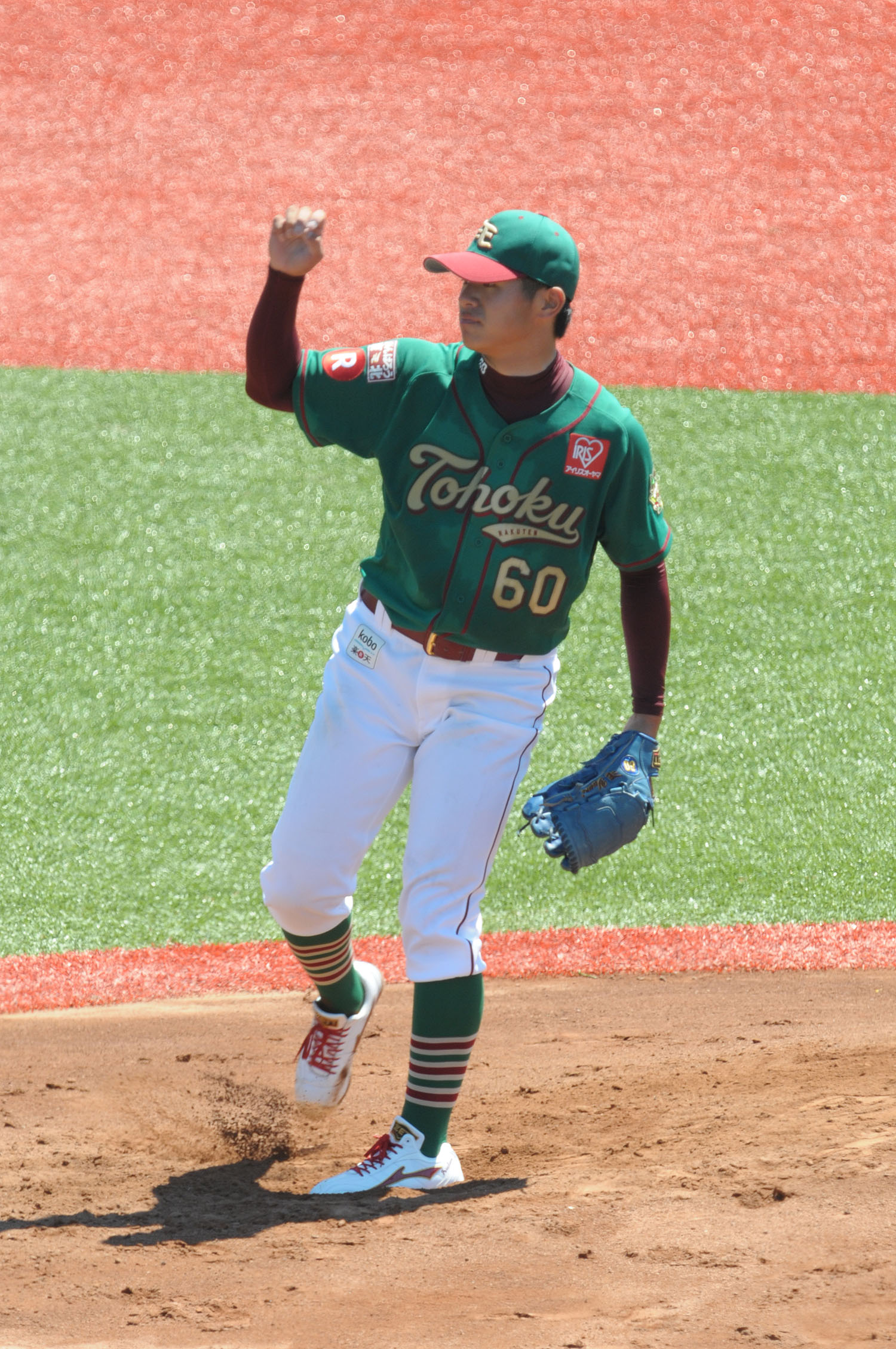
"Tohoku Green" uniform, 2014

In addition to the various Fans' uniform iterations, the Eagles have worn several themed seasonal uniforms throughout its history. The first was introduced in 2011 to celebrate the team's seventh season, a lucky number in Japan. The design, dubbed the "Eagle Rainbow", was drastically different from the team's previous uniforms. The jersey was the team's only v-neck pullover and was white and crimson with seven different shades of red, orange, and yellow. The chest bore the word "Eagles" in a simple dark blue font with a logo illustration of an eagle underneath. The cap emblem was also changed to feature the same "E" as on the chest. The uniforms were worn during four interleague games that season, and the player-worn jerseys were auctioned off to raise money for earthquake relief. The team has worn a special summer uniform every season since, and next season Rakuten unveiled the "Eagle Star" uniform, which added crimson, full-body pinstripes to the home design. The "Tohoku Green" theme was introduced in 2013 and variations of the same uniform was used for three seasons. To bring attention to the conservation of Tōhoku's forests, the jerseys were green and displayed "Tohoku" across the chest. Full-body crimson pinstripes were brought back in 2016, this time extending to the cap as well. These "Eagle Summer" uniforms also displayed "Rakuten" on the chest. The next two seasons featured black jerseys and caps. The first, "Black Eagles" in 2017, was a black version of the home uniforms. The following year, the "Tōhoku Pride" uniform was a black version of that year's Fans' uniform. The current special uniform theme is "Tohoku Blue", a companion to the green theme. First introduced in 2019, the jersey design was similar to the previous year's, however it was blue to represent the sky. The colors were modified for the following season when it changed to white with blue pinstripes. As with the Fans' uniform, 2020's Tohoku Blue uniforms are returning for 2021.

=== Mascots ===
At the time of team's inception, Rakuten created a pair of unnamed male and female golden eagle mascots. The name Clutch (and the feminine Clutchena) was selected from approximately 6,500 suggestions that were solicited from the public. The name has a double meaning derived from the word "clutch", such as the grasp of an eagle's claw, as well as the baseball concept of a clutch hitter. Clutch wears a jersey bearing the number 10, an Eagles retired number that represents the fans. A third mascot, a harpy eagle named Switch, was unveiled in 2016. The Eagles have also periodically featured an unofficial, mischievous mascot named Mr. Carrasco. The character, based on a black crow, is masked and rides a motorcycle. For Black Eagles Day in 2017, Rakuten added a mascot character called Kurowashi-san. Unlike the other costumed mascots, Kurowashi-san appeared as a normal man with a black eagle on his head.

== Farm team ==
The Golden Eagles farm team plays in the Eastern League. The team was founded in 2005.

== See also ==
- "The Manpower!!!" (THE マンパワー!!!) – the first Golden Eagles' official cheer song, recorded and released as a single by J-pop idol group Morning Musume.
- "Koero! Rakuten Eagles" (越えろ!楽天イーグルス) – the fourth Golden Eagles' official cheer song, recorded by J-pop idol group Cute.
- Vegalta Sendai

== Notes ==
Awards and achievements
Preceded by Yomiuri Giants	Japan Series champions 2013	Succeeded by Fukuoka SoftBank Hawks
Preceded by Hokkaido Nippon-Ham Fighters	Pacific League champions 2013	Succeeded by Fukuoka SoftBank Hawks
Preceded by Yokohama DeNA BayStars	Interleague champions 2024	Succeeded by Fukuoka SoftBank Hawks
