= History of the Tohoku Rakuten Golden Eagles =

Sports team history

The history of the Tohoku Rakuten Golden Eagles Nippon Professional Baseball (NPB) began in 2004 when two Pacific League (PL) teams, the Osaka Kintetsu Buffaloes and the Orix BlueWave, merged to create the Orix Buffaloes. After the league's first and only players strike on September 18–19, team representatives agreed to ease the rules of entry for new teams into NPB and that one would be allowed to join the following season to fill the void left by the merger. Beating out Livedoor, Hiroshi Mikitani's internet services company Rakuten was selected to create a new PL team to be based in Sendai, Miyagi Prefecture. The new club was named the "Tohoku Rakuten Golden Eagles" and they would play in the newly renovated Miyagi Stadium.

== 2004: Origins and formation ==
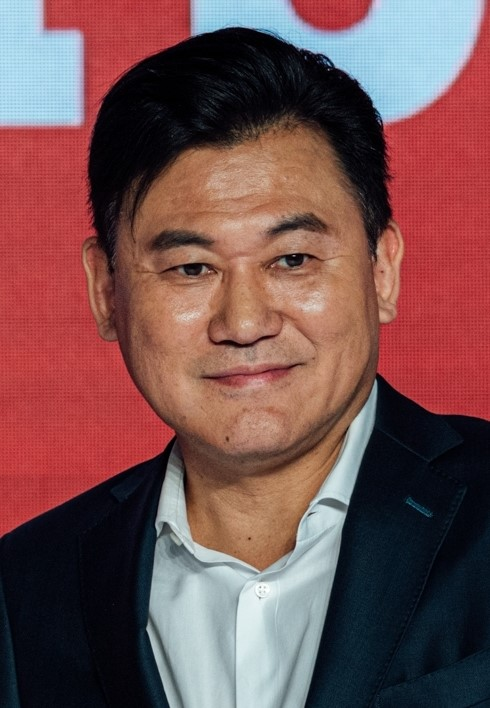
Rakuten president Hiroshi Mikitani

In June of Nippon Professional Baseball's (NPB) 2004 season, the Osaka Kintetsu Buffaloes and the Orix BlueWave announced that, due to financial difficulties, the two teams planned to merge into one for the start of the 2005 season. Both teams were in the Pacific League (PL), and a merger between the two would result in a team imbalance with the PL's opposing league, the Central League (CL). As a large number of players were expected to lose their jobs when the merger was finalized, the Japan Professional Baseball Players Association (JPBPA) organized a players' strike in an attempt to force the postponement of the merger for at least one year. When team officials definitively announced that a one-year freeze on the merger was impossible, the players conducted a two-day strike on September 18–19, 2004. With the threat of further strikes looming, team representatives agreed to ease the rules of entry for new teams into NPB and that one would be allowed to join the following season.

That same month, Takafumi Horie, president of the internet services company Livedoor, established a new professional baseball team and applied for team ownership with NPB, hoping to fill the void left by the merger of the BlueWave and the Buffaloes. Horie intended the team to be composed of players who were left jobless after the merger and planned for it to be based in Sendai, Miyagi Prefecture. One week later a second internet services company, Tokyo-based Rakuten, also submitted a formal application to Japanese professional baseball to form a team. Like Horie, Rakuten president Hiroshi Mikitani also expressed a desire to locate his new team in Sendai.

In early October, the public screening process to select one of the two companies and allow them form a new NPB team began. Both Livedoor and Rakuten were given an hour and a half to discuss their team and budget propositions before a panel of five Japanese baseball executives. The panel consisted of Central League chairman Hajime Toyokura and the head officials of the Yomiuri Giants, the Yokohama BayStars, the Seibu Lions and the Chiba Lotte Marines. The screening standards included the adequacy of the applications, the prospective continuity and stability of the planned baseball teams, the prospective financial standings of the applicants and planned teams, and their planned baseball facilities. As screenings were held weekly through October, more details about each potential new team emerged. Rakuten, announced Marty Kuehnert and Yasushi Tao as general manager and manager, respectively, of their newly named "Tohoku Rakuten Golden Eagles" baseball club. The team was named after the Japanese golden eagle, a large, endangered, predatory bird found in the mountains of the Tōhoku region. Upon registering the trademark for their name, Rakuten learned that Livedoor had registered an "eagles" trademark one day earlier. Livedoor allowed Rakuten to use the name, however, after it placed second behind "phoenix" in an internet poll that the company was using to determine the name of their team.

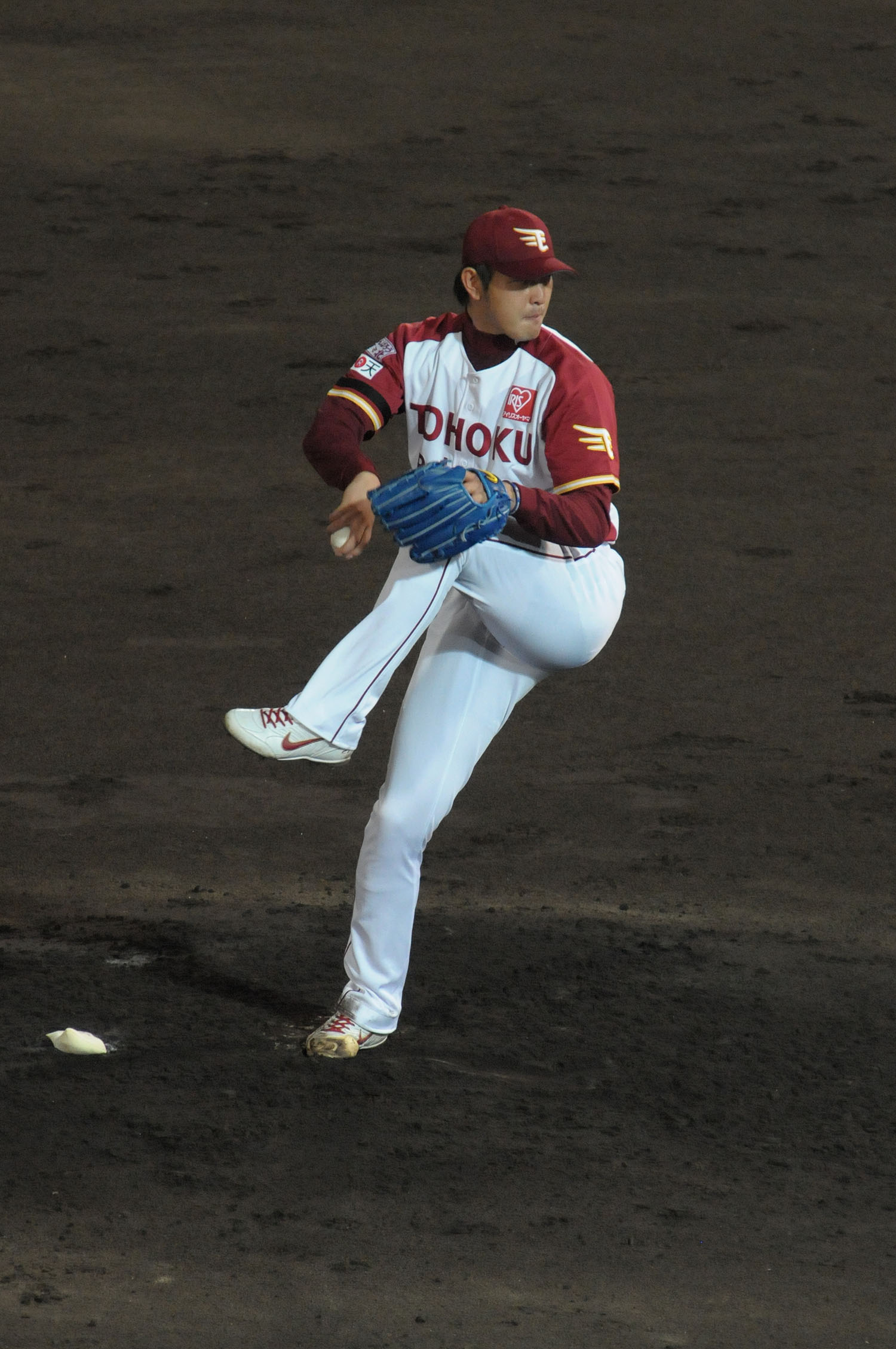
Star pitcher Hisashi Iwakuma was traded to the Eagles following the expansion draft.

A telephone survey conducted by Kyodo News during the selection period of 300 people living in Tōhoku indicated that Livedoor was the early fan favorite to win the right to start a new team in Sendai. In the survey, forty percent of the respondents supported Livedoor's bid compared to only seven percent supporting Rakuten. Rakuten, however, was considered the more likely of the two companies to be chosen by NPB. Rakuten president Mikitani had extensive connections in established Japanese business circles and already operated another sports team, the soccer club Vissel Kobe in Japan's J.League. On November 2, NPB selected Rakuten over Livedoor to create a new Pacific League team to be based in Sendai. The team would play its home games in Miyagi Stadium, which was being renovated by Rakuten. It was the first time a new team, excluding cases of mergers or acquisitions, joined NPB since the creation of the now-defunct Takahashi Unions in the Pacific League in 1954.

Team owner Mikitani was looking for someone that didn't have a relationship with the old Japanese business community to run the team. In hiring Kuhnert, NPB's first foreign general manager, he hoped to bring "new blood" and "innovative ideas" to Japanese baseball. Kuhnert's approach to the team was analytic and sabermetrics-minded. He was known for his criticisms of Japanese baseball's traditionally intense training methods and hired a like-minded managers and coaches. The Eagles' budget for the year was $22 million, the lowest in NPB.

Instead of allowing the Eagles to draft players from all 11 NPB teams in an expansion draft, the team had to construct their roster from the 107 players left over from the dissolved Kintetsu and original Orix teams during a special dispersal draft held on November 8. Furthermore, Orix was allowed to select 25 players that would be protected from the distribution process before the draft, thus giving them preferential signing rights. Included in these selections were all free agents and foreign players. Rakuten was only then allowed to select 20 unprotected players, not including any first- or second-year players. After that, the first- and second-year players were unprotected and Orix and Rakuten alternating selecting 20 more players for the last round of the draft. Of the 40 players the Eagles selected, 17 were pitchers and 23 were position players. The league's decision to employ an unequal dispersal draft to build the Eagles roster was blamed for the team's struggles to come. An expansion draft would have better allowed for the new team to be more competitive. Mikitani believed the draft to be "unfair".

In the draft, Rakuten was able to pick up former Buffaloes outfielder Koichi Isobe. Isobe was left unprotected by Orix as he refused to play for their newly formed team because of their involvement in the merger. Despite also voicing that he no intention of playing for the merged team, Orix protected Hisashi Iwakuma, the Kintetsu Buffaloes' pitcher who led the league in wins the previous season. Iwakuma insisted that Orix team president Takashi Koizumi live up to his pledge that he would sincerely listen to the players involved in the merger regarding their futures. After four rounds of talks between Iwakuma and Koizumi, negotiations broke down and the JPBPA was brought in to mediate. Eventually, Orix agreed to trade him to the Eagles in exchange for cash. Rakuten also signed five foreign players before the start of the season to help fill out its debut-season roster.

== 2005–2009: Debut and the road to the Climax Series ==
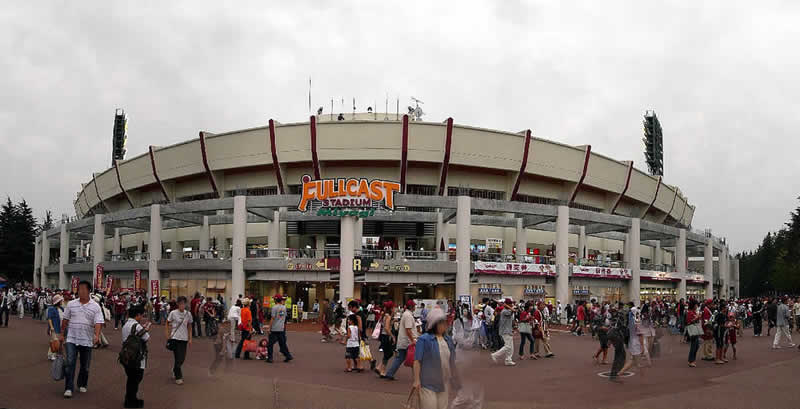
Partially-renovated Fullcast Stadium at the time of the Eagle's inaugural season

After winning the first game of their debut season behind starting pitcher Hisashi Iwakuma, the Tohoku Rakuten Golden Eagles lost their second game to the Chiba Lotte Marines, 0–26. The loss tied the 1946 Gold Star record for losing by the highest run differential in Japanese professional baseball history. Following a 6–22 start, just over a month into the season, the Eagles removed Kuehnert as general manager and demoted the head and batting coaches. Eventually it was revealed that there had been friction between Kuehnert and higher-ups, and that he had been denied powers afforded to most general managers, such as being able to attend league or players' association meetings, having input in the budget, and being made a company director. Over the course of the season, the team posted two separate 11-game losing streaks and last place in the PL was ensured after a loss on August 29, a month before the end of the regular season. The Eagles finished 51.5 games out of first place and was the first NPB team in 40 years to lose over 90 games in a single season. As a result, ten players were released, and Tao was dismissed despite being signed to a three-year contract.

In an otherwise disastrous season, one highlight was team's home debut on April 1. Only five months after being awarded a franchise and without a preseason game as a dry run, Rakuten ran and operated the game smoothly in front of a packed, newly named Fullcast Stadium. Isobe hit a home run in the team's first at-bat, and they went on to defeat the Seibu Lions, the defending Japan Series champion, 16–5. It was also estimated that the economic impact of the team in the Tōhoku region was $300 million in the first year. Furthermore, after the season, the team expected to post a profit of tens of millions of yen instead of the ¥1.5 billion loss that it had projected. Contributing factors were that the average home-game attendance for the year came close to the team's target of 15,000 per game, sales of Eagles' merchandise were strong, and players' performance-based pay was minimal. The team expected to post a loss the next season with plans to spend more than ¥1 billion on enhancing player training and about ¥3 billion on the continuing remodel of Fullcast Stadium. The stadium's off-season renovations expanded its seating capacity to allow for 23,000 spectators in addition to adding a sports bar, press seats, broadcast booths, a lounge, luxury boxes, and additional food concessions.

In an about-face from its nontraditional approach to its inaugural season, Mikitani instead looked to experience to lead the Eagles in its second season when he replaced first-time manager Tao with Hall of Famer and veteran manager Katsuya Nomura. The team also acquired third baseman José Fernández from the Seibu Lions in the off-season. The team improved slightly over its first season, and Fernández went on to receive the Eagles' first Best Nine Award in his first season with the team. However, the 2006 season also brought the Eagles' their first no-hit loss, and they still finished last in the Pacific League. At the end of the season, Rakuten drafted pitcher Masahiro Tanaka in the first round of the 2006 amateur high school draft. They were awarded the opportunity to draft Tanaka after winning a four-team lottery against the Yokohama BayStars, Orix Buffaloes, and Hokkaido Nippon-Ham Fighters, who also named him as their first-round selection.

The Eagles' first real signs of improvement came during the 2007 season, the team's third. First baseman and designated hitter Takeshi Yamasaki led the league in home runs through May and was named the Pacific League MVP for the month of May, the team's first. Yamasaki, as the top vote-getter overall, went on to be selected by fans to the Pacific League All-Star team for the 2007 All-Star Series. With one of the All-Star games being played at the Eagles' home stadium that year, fans also voted in seven other Rakuten players, including rookie pitcher Tanaka. The Eagles were the first PL team to have eight players selected for the All-Star team since 1978. Nomura was critical of the fans' selections, stating that not all of his players selected were worthy of being named All-Stars. Rakuten finished the season with a losing record, however, for the first time they did not finish the season last, instead finishing fourth. At the end of the season, Yamasaki led the league in both home runs and runs batted in (RBIs) and Tanaka was awarded the Pacific League Rookie of the Year Award. In the off-season, the team's president since its inception, Toru Shimada, acquired ownership of the team. Additionally, Nippon Paper acquired the naming rights to Miyagi Stadium, and the park was renamed Kleenex Stadium. The team finished fifth next season, however, Iwakuma finished with the best earned run average (ERA) and most wins in the league after struck by injuries the previous few years. At season's end, he was presented with his and the team's first PL Most Valuable Player (MVP) and Eiji Sawamura Awards.

In the 2008–09 offseason, the Eagles extended Nomura's contract to keep him on as manager for one more year. By mid-August of the 2009 season, the team found themselves battling for their first playoff berth. With a win on October 9, Rakuten secured second place in the Pacific League and advanced to the Climax Series. Shimada, however, announced before the start of the playoffs that Nomura still would not return as manager for the following season despite the Eagles advancing to the postseason for the first time in its history. A pair of complete game wins at home both by Iwakuma and Tanaka in the first stage allowed the Eagles to advance, however, the managerial decision loomed over the 2009 Pacific League Climax Series and Nomura expressed bitterness about the situation after the sweep. Rakuten lost to the Hokkaido Nippon-Ham Fighters in four games in the Climax Series' second stage, ending their season. Despite the loss, Nomura praised Sendai's fans and was tossed into the air in celebration by members of both the Eagles and the Fighters.

== 2010–2013: From disaster to championship ==
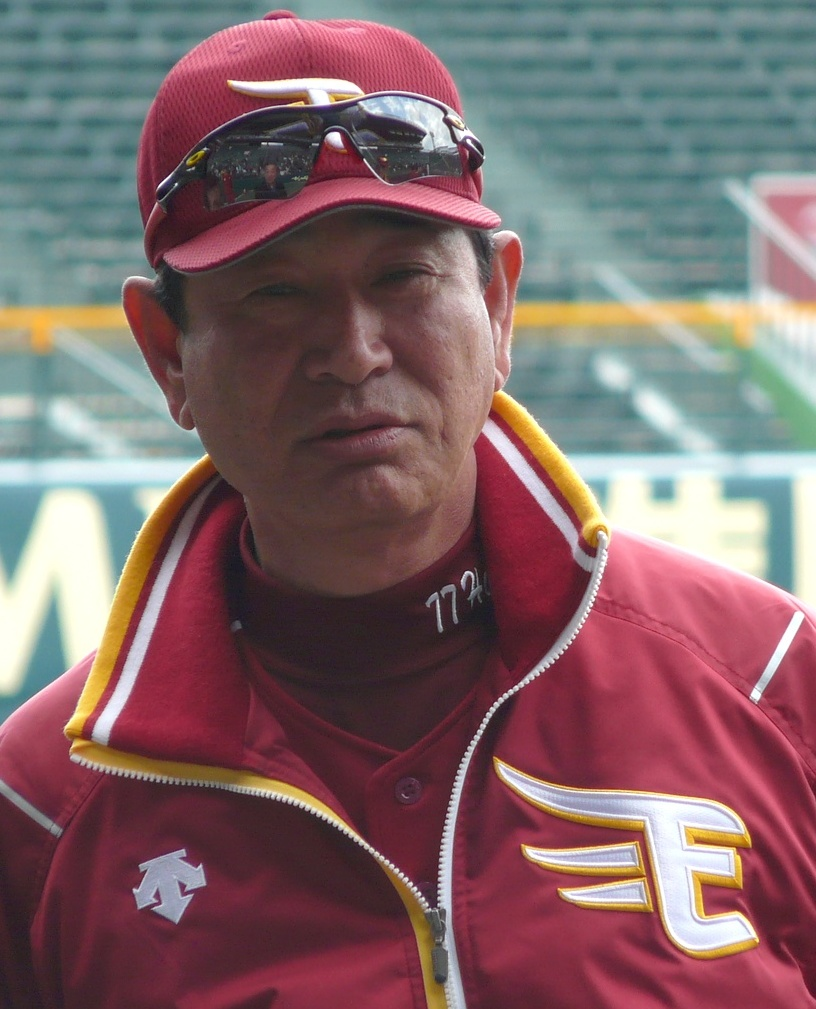
Manager Senichi Hoshino led the team to its first and only championship in 2013

Rakuten hired American and the former Hiroshima Toyo Carp manager Marty Brown to succeed Nomura. Even though Brown was signed to a two-year contract, he was let go a year later after the Eagles finished the 2010 season in last place. The club looked to Senichi Hoshino next to turn the team around. Before the season started, however, the team allowed Iwakuma to pursue a career in Major League Baseball (MLB) via the posting system. The Oakland Athletics's were awarded exclusive negotiating rights after agreeing to pay a $19.1 million transfer fee to Rakuten, but contract negotiations between the A's and Iwakuma ended without an agreement and he returned to the Eagles. Kazuo Matsui and Akinori Iwamura, both returning from playing stints in MLB, were also added to the roster. Teppei Tsuchiya was also named as the team's first ever captain.

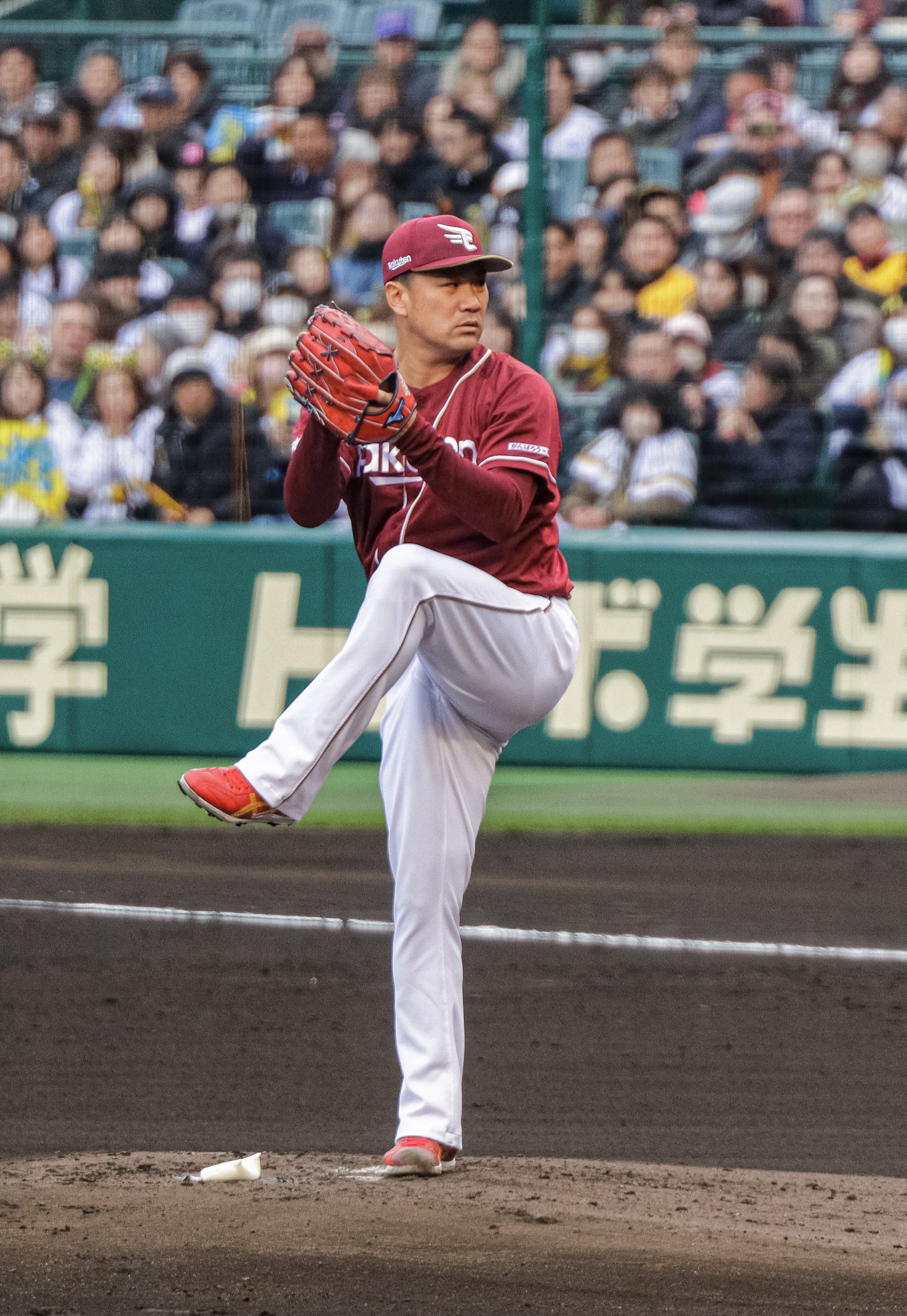
Masahiro Tanaka in 2024

On March 11, 2011, two weeks before the first game of the season, the Tōhoku region was struck by the largest earthquake in the country's history. The quake and the subsequent tsunami devastated the region, including the Eagles' home city of Sendai. The preseason game that Rakuten was playing against the Hanshin Tigers in Akashi, Hyōgo at the time of the event was cancelled after the eighth inning so players and personnel could check on the safety of their friends and families in the area. With the season opener postponed until April 12, the Eagles continued to train in the Kansai region because of the damage to Sendai and Kleenex Stadium. In addition to the Eagles holding fund-raising events, all 12 teams played charity games between April 3 to 4 to help raise money for earthquake relief. The club opened the season at QVC Marine Field against the Marines. Fans displaced by the earthquake were able to watch Rakuten's come-from-behind win on large screens the team set up at 20 refuge sites in Tōhoku. Days later, they hosted their first "home" game at Koshien Stadium while the restoration work to Kleenex Stadium continued. The earthquake had damaged 47 different parts of the stadium, including its lights and outside walls. Baseball returned to Sendai on April 29, when the Eagles played their first game at their home field. An opening ceremony attended by the governor of Miyagi Prefecture Yoshihiro Murai and United States Ambassador John Roos was held before the game and Rakuten went on to win. Furthermore, the final game of the 2011 All-Star Series was switched from Tokyo Dome to Kleenex Stadium, the second time the Eagles hosted the event in four years.

Rakuten finished the 2011 season in fifth and again missed the playoffs. However, in addition to winning a Golden Glove and a Best Nine award, Tanaka was also named PL MVP of the month three times over the course of the season, a first in the Pacific League. After the season, Hisashi Iwakuma left the club and signed a deal with MLB's Seattle Mariners. Starting with the 2012 season, Kazuo Matsui was named team captain. Later that same season, Toru Shimada retired as team president and owner and Yozo Tachibana was hired to replace him as team president and Mikitani was once again appointed as owner. Rakuten went deep into the season as a playoff contender that year, but ultimately missed advancing to the Climax Series by one game and finished fourth.

Before the start of the 2013 season, the Eagles signed former MLB players Casey McGehee and Andruw Jones. During spring training, Tanaka and Matsui played in the 2013 World Baseball Classic (WBC) with the Japan national baseball team. Because of Tanaka's participation in the WBC so close to the start of the season, it was decided that he would not pitch on Opening Day. Instead, Takahiro Norimoto was selected to be Rakuten's Opening Day starting pitcher, becoming the first rookie start Opening Day in the PL in 55 years. The Eagles finished April in fifth place, however, the next two months saw Tanaka winning consecutive PL MVP of the month awards, helping the club to finish June in second. The team took sole possession of first place in the Pacific League in early July and never relinquished it, winning the Eagles' their first PL pennant. Over the remaining three months of the season, Tanaka continued to win games and finished the season with 24 wins and no losses. He was awarded a record-setting five consecutive monthly MVPs from May to September. As league champions, the Eagles advanced directly to the final stage of the Climax Series Final where they defeated the Marines to advance to their first Japan Series. Rakuten defeated the Giants at home in the final game of a seven-game series to win the franchise's first and only Japan Series championship. Starting pitcher Manabu Mima was named the Japan Series MVP after the series, and at the end of the season, Tanaka was presented with the PL MVP and Eiji Sawamura Awards, Norimoto was named the PL Rookie of the Year, and Senichi Hoshino was given the Matsutaro Shoriki Award. In the offseason, Miyagi Stadium's name was changed to Kobo Stadium, and after the increased ticket demand during the 2013 season, an expansion project that increased its maximum seating capacity above 28,000 was completed the next year.

== 2014–2017: Post-Tanaka struggles ==
Following the championship-winning season, Masahiro Tanaka left the Eagles via the posting system to play for the New York Yankees, netting the team a $20 million transfer fee in return. Likewise, McGehee also left for MLB, and the team struggled in the years following their departures, finishing last the next season. This disappointing finish, along with back problems that caused him to miss almost two months of the season, prompted manager Senichi Hoshino to resign despite ownership wanting him to return for a fifth season. Rakuten promoted their farm team manager Hiromoto Okubo to manager and named catcher Motohiro Shima the team's new captain for the 2015 season. At the end of July, hitting coach Tomio Tashiro abruptly resigned and it was revealed that owner Hiroshi Mikitani had often been interfering in on-the-field decisions, such as dictating the batting order. After Tashiro's resignation, Mikitani began conferring with field personnel before making any decisions, however the team again finished in last and Okubo resigned at the end of the season. The turmoil brought about by Mikitani taking the lead on baseball operations after Hoshino's unexpected resignation forced Rakuten to reevaluate how the team was managed and organized. It was decided that Hoshino, who had been retained as an Eagles vice chairman, would have full authority over baseball operations, similar to the role of an MLB general manager.

In preparation for the 2016 season, Kobo Stadium underwent its last major renovation during the offseason, increasing its capacity to over 30,000 people. The team, hoping to avoid a third consecutive last-place finish, hired veteran Pacific League manager Masataka Nashida and signed free agent Toshiaki Imae, a two-time Japan Series MVP. During the season, Rakuten formed a training team to help further develop talent by playing against university, corporate, club, and independent teams. The Eagles avoided finishing the season in last, however they placed fifth and again missed the playoffs. During the offseason, Hoshino was inducted into the Japanese Baseball Hall of Fame; his copper plaque depicts him wearing an Eagles cap.

The 2017 Eagles bounced back and found themselves battling the Lions near the end of the season for second place. Ultimately, the team secured a first stage Climax Series berth against the Lions with a third-place finish. After losing the first game of the three-game series, Rakuten won the final two to defeat Seibu and advance to the final stage. Against the Fukuoka SoftBank Hawks, the Eagles took the first two games of the series but were eliminated after the Hawks won the next three.

== 2018–present: Kazuhisa Ishii era ==
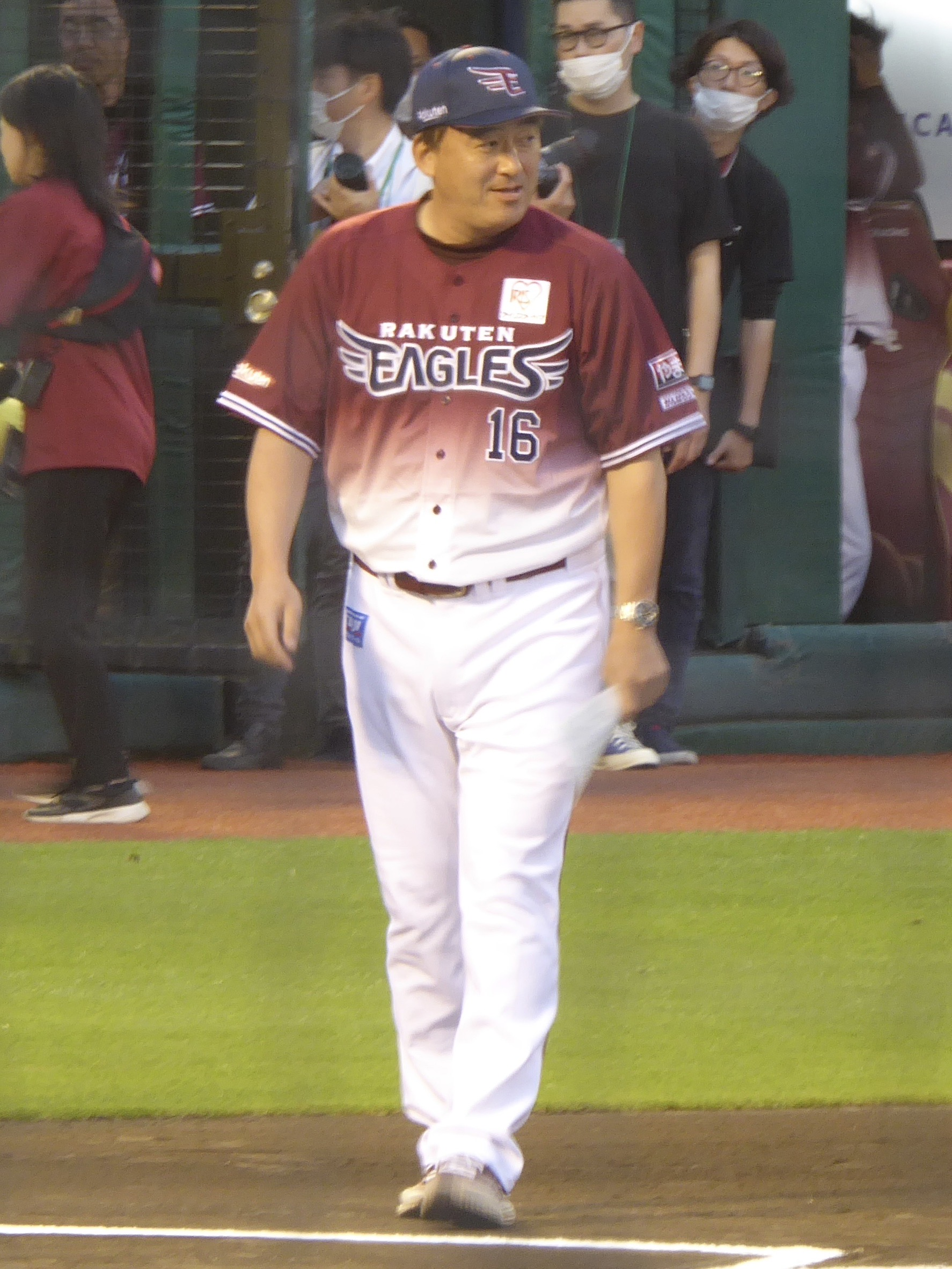
Kazuhisa Ishii as manager in 2023

Hoshino died in January 2018. Following the death, Rakuten erected a memorial flower stand in front of the newly-named Rakuten Seimei Park Miyagi. Mikitani then announced that Hoshino's uniform number 77 would be retired permanently before the start of the season. The Eagles struggled immediately that year, falling to 20 games under .500 by mid-June. Taking responsibility for the team's poor performance, Nashida resigned as manager that month and head coach Yosuke Hiraishi was given the position for the remainder of the season. The Eagles went on to finish the season in last, however before it was over Rakuten formally brought back the general manager position in Hoshino's absence. Former NPB and MLB pitcher Kazuhisa Ishii was hired in the role to help coordinate the efforts of the front office and field management. Infielder Kazuki Tanaka was awarded Rookie of the Year at season's end.

Hiraishi was kept on as full-time manager for 2019, and in the offseason Ishii signed Jabari Blash and former Lions' captain Hideto Asamura. Ginji Akaminai, however, was named as the Eagles' captain for the year. Norimoto had elbow surgery in March and missed half of the season as a result. Yuki Matsui, Rakuten's first-round 2013 draft pick and closer, recorded 38 saves by season's end, the most in the league, and Blash and Asamura went on to hit 33 home runs each. The Eagles narrowly secured the third spot in the Climax Series, but they was defeated two games to one by SoftBank in the first stage. Another managerial change was made after the loss, and Hajime Miki was promoted from farm team manager. Furthermore, Eigoro Mogi replaced Ginji as captain after only one year.

Among Rakuten's various offseason moves, the team traded for starting pitcher Hideaki Wakui and signed free agent Daichi Suzuki. In a COVID-shortened 2020 season, the Eagles started strong behind the hitting of Asamura and Suzuki. By season's end, Asamura had hit 32 home runs, becoming Rakuten's second league home run champion since Yamasaki in 2007, and Wakui finished tied for the most wins in the PL with 11. The team, however, failed to capture a playoff berth and Miki returned to his previous post as manager of the second squad. Ishii announced in the offseason that he himself would replace Miki as manager and signed a three-year contract to assume both managerial and GM duties starting with the 2021 season. The move marked Ishii's first ever coaching or managing role in professional baseball. Meanwhile, the conclusion of MLB's 2020 season marked the end of Masahiro Tanaka's seven-year contract with the Yankees. Instead of signing with another MLB team, Tanaka chose to return to Japan and signed a two-year contract with Rakuten. Rakuten also won the rights to sign their first round draft pick, pitcher Takahisa Hayakawa, in the 2020 draft.

Matsui returned as the team's closer in 2021 after attempting to be a starting pitcher the season prior. Tanaka was planned to make his NPB return in the second game of the season. The day before the start, however, Rakuten announced that he would miss the game because of a calf injury and he would need three weeks to recover. The Eagles found themselves in second place by the season's mid-point, with their relief pitching, particularly Matsui, being a standout. They struggled to get production out of their designated hitter position, however, and led the league in runners left on base by a large margin. The team was still competing for first place by late August when Matsui suffered a season-ending thigh injury. Rakuten never fell below .500 all season, but ultimately finished in third place, enough for the final PL playoff slot. The team left the most runners on base for the second consecutive year; their .329 on-base percentage was the highest in the league, but their .239 batting average with runners in scoring position was fifth-best and the lowest in Eagle's history. The team's sole offensive success was Hiroaki Shimauchi, who hit a team-high 21 home runs and had a .328 batting average, second highest in the PL. The team lost and tied against Marines in the two-game Climax Series first stage, knocking them out of the playoffs.

In the 2021–22 offseason, Yozo Tachibana retired after nine years as team president and Yosuke Yoneda took over the position. Furthermore, Ishii decided that the team would have no captain for the 2022 season, the first time the team would be without a captain since their first was appointed in 2011.

Tomohiro Anraku scandal at end of 2023 https://www.sanspo.com/article/20231011-Z2UEWKDDBNI5ZA2EENR4FQA2RY/
