= List of Tohoku Rakuten Golden Eagles seasons =

The Tohoku Rakuten Golden Eagles have completed 21 seasons in Nippon Professional Baseball (NPB) since their inaugural season in 2005. The team was formed to fill the void left in the Pacific League when the Osaka Kintetsu Buffaloes and the Orix BlueWave merged during the 2004 NPB realignment. As of 2025, they have played 2,974 regular season games, winning 1,354, losing 1,536, and tying 84 for a winning percentage of .469. The Eagles have also a combined record of 15–14–1 (.517) in post-season and Japan Series play. The team is based in Sendai, Miyagi Prefecture.

== Seasons ==
Key to colors

†	Japan Series champions
*	Pacific League champions
^	Playoff berth

Key to abbreviations

- PL – Pacific League
- W – Wins
- L – Losses
- T – Ties
- GB - Games behind^{[a]}
- CS – Climax Series

Key to awards

- ESA – Eiji Sawamura Award
- JS MVP – Japan Series Most Valuable Player Award
- MSA – Matsutaro Shoriki Award
- MVP – Most Valuable Player Award
- ROY – Rookie of the Year Award

Season	League	Regular season						Postseason (Climax & Japan Series)	Manager(s)	Awards	Home attendance	Notes
Season	League	Finish	W	L	T	Win%	GB	Postseason (Climax & Japan Series)	Manager(s)	Awards	Home attendance	Notes
2005	PL	6th	38	97	1	.281	51 1/2		Yasushi Tao		977,104	
2006	PL	6th	47	85	4	.356	33		Katsuya Nomura		951,723	
2007	PL	4th	67	75	2	.472	13 1/2		Katsuya Nomura	Masahiro Tanaka (ROY)	1,117,369	
2008	PL	5th	65	76	3	.461	11 1/2		Katsuya Nomura	Hisashi Iwakuma (ESA, MVP)	1,149,061	
2009	PL	2nd^	77	66	1	.538	5 1/2	Won CS first stage (SoftBank) 2–0; Lost CS second stage (Nippon Ham) 1–4^{[b]}	Katsuya Nomura		1,203,169	
2010	PL	6th	62	79	3	.440	15		Marty Brown		1,141,640	
2011	PL	5th	66	71	7	.482	23 1/2		Senichi Hoshino	Masahiro Tanaka (ESA)	1,168,188	
2012	PL	4th	67	67	10	.500	7 1/2		Senichi Hoshino		1,177,793	
2013^{†}	PL*	1st^	82	59	3	.582	—	Won CS final stage (Lotte) 4–1^{[b]} Won Japan Series (Yomiuri) 4–3	Senichi Hoshino	Senichi Hoshino (MSA); Takahiro Norimoto (ROY); Manabu Mima (JS MVP); Masahiro Tanaka (ESA, MVP)	1,281,087	
2014	PL	6th	64	80	0	.444	17		Senichi Hoshino		1,450,233	
2015	PL	6th	57	83	3	.407	33 1/2		Hiromoto Okubo		1,524,149	
2016	PL	5th	62	78	3	.443	25		Masataka Nashida		1,620,961	
2017	PL	3rd^	77	63	3	.550	15 1/2	Won CS first stage (Seibu) 2–1; Lost CS final stage (SoftBank) 2–4^{[b]}	Masataka Nashida		1,770,108	
2018	PL	6th	58	82	3	.414	29 1/2		Masataka Nashida Yosuke Hiraishi	Kazuki Tanaka (ROY)	1,726,004	
2019	PL	3rd^	71	68	4	.511	7 1/2	Lost CS first stage (SoftBank) 1–2	Yosuke Hiraishi		1,821,785	
2020	PL	4th	55	57	8	.491	16 1/2		Hajime Miki		236,084^{[c]}	
2021	PL	3rd^	66	62	15	.516	5 1/2	Lost CS first stage (Lotte) 0–1–1	Kazuhisa Ishii		615,237^{[c]}	
2022	PL	4th	69	71	3	.493	6 1/2		Kazuhisa Ishii		1,331,131	
2023	PL	4th	70	71	2	.496	17		Kazuhisa Ishii		1,358,512	
2024	PL	4th	67	72	4	.482	23 1/2		Toshiaki Imae		1,642,371	
2025	PL	4th	67	74	2	.475	21		Hajime Miki		1,707,349	
2026	PL	6th	58	84	1	.408	34		Hajime Miki Tatsuya Shiokawa Masato Yoshii			
Total：22 seasons, 3,117 games			1,412	1,620	85	.466	Pennants：1, Championships：1					

Statistics current through the 2026 season

== Notes ==
- ^{a} Games behind is determined by calculating the difference in wins plus the difference in losses divided by two.
- ^{b} The final stage of the Climax Series awards the regular season champion an automatic one-win advantage.
- ^{c} NPB's 2020 season was shortened due to COVID-19 pandemic. Attendance to games that did occur was either prohibited or significantly limited. Limiting attendance continued into the 2021 season.
