= 2019 Tohoku Rakuten Golden Eagles season =

Professional sports season in Nippon Professional Baseball

2019 Tohoku Rakuten Golden Eagles
- Climax Series berth
- 15th anniversary logo
- League: Pacific League
- Ballpark: Rakuten Seimei Park Miyagi
- Record: 71–68–4 (.511)
- League place: 3rd
- Parent company: Rakuten
- President: Yozo Tachibana
- General manager: Kazuhisa Ishii
- Manager: Yosuke Hiraishi
- Captain: Ginji Akaminai
- Average attendance: 25,659

The 2019 Tohoku Rakuten Golden Eagles season was the fifteenth season of the Tohoku Rakuten Golden Eagles franchise. The Eagles played their home games at Rakuten Seimei Park Miyagi in the city of Sendai as members of Nippon Professional Baseball's Pacific League. The team was led by Yosuke Hiraishi in his first and only season as team manager.

Rakuten finished the season with a record of 71–68–4, securing third place in the PL and qualifying for the Climax Series. They were eliminated by the Fukuoka SoftBank Hawks in the First Stage in three games.

== Regular season standings ==
2019 Pacific League regular season standings
#	Team	G	W	L	T	Pct.	GB	Home	Road
1	Saitama Seibu Lions	143	80	62	1	.563	-	43–29–0	37–33–1
2	Fukuoka SoftBank Hawks	143	76	62	5	.551	2	42–27–3	34–35-2
3	Tohoku Rakuten Golden Eagles	143	71	68	4	.511	7½	36–33–2	35–35–2
4	Chiba Lotte Marines	143	69	70	4	.504	9½	37–32–2	32–38–2
5	Hokkaido Nippon-Ham Fighters	143	65	73	5	.471	12	35–34–3	30–39–2
6	Orix Buffaloes	143	61	75	7	.452	14	32–34–5	29–41–2

=== Record vs. opponents ===
2019 record vs. opponents
Team	Buffaloes	Eagles	Fighters	Hawks	Lions	Marines	CL
Buffaloes	—	12–12–1	8–15–2	7–16–2	8–17	15–9–1	11–6–1
Eagles	12–12–1	—	13–11–1	12–13	14–11	10–13–2	10–8
Fighters	15–8–2	11–13–1	—	9–15–1	11–14	11–14	8–9–1
Hawks	16–7–2	13–12	15–9–1	—	13–12	8–17	11–5–2
Lions	17–8	11–14	14–11	12–13	—	16–8–1	10–8
Marines	9–15–1	13–10–2	14–11	17–8	8–16–1	—	8–10

=== Interleague ===
2019 regular season interleague standings
#	Team	G	W	L	T	Pct.	GB	Home	Road
1	Fukuoka SoftBank Hawks	18	11	5	2	.688	—	5–2–2	6–3
2	Orix Buffaloes	18	11	6	1	.647	.5	5–3–1	6–3
3	Yomiuri Giants	18	11	7	0	.611	1	5–4	6–3
4	Yokohama DeNA BayStars	18	10	7	1	.588	1.5	6–3	4–4–1
5	Saitama Seibu Lions	18	10	8	0	.556	2	5–4	5–4
6	Tohoku Rakuten Golden Eagles	18	10	8	0	.556	2	4–5	6–3
7	Hokkaido Nippon-Ham Fighters	18	8	9	1	.471	3.5	5–3–1	3–6
8	Chunichi Dragons	18	8	10	0	.444	4	4–5	4–5
9	Chiba Lotte Marines	18	8	10	0	.444	4	3–6	5–4
10	Hanshin Tigers	18	6	10	2	.375	5	3–6	3–4–2
11	Tokyo Yakult Swallows	18	6	12	0	.333	6	3–6	3–6
12	Hiroshima Toyo Carp	18	5	12	1	.294	6.5	2–7	3–5–1

=== Opening Day starting roster ===
Friday, March 29, 2019, vs. Chiba Lotte Marines

Order	Player	Position
1	Kazuki Tanaka	Center fielder
2	Eigoro Mogi	Shortstop
3	Hideto Asamura	Second baseman
4	Hiroaki Shimauchi	Left fielder
5	Zelous Wheeler	Third baseman
6	Ginji Akaminai	First baseman
7	Jabari Blash	Designated hitter
8	Motohiro Shima	Catcher
9	Louis Okoye	Right fielder
—	Takayuki Kishi	Starting pitcher
