= 2014 MLB Japan All-Star Series =

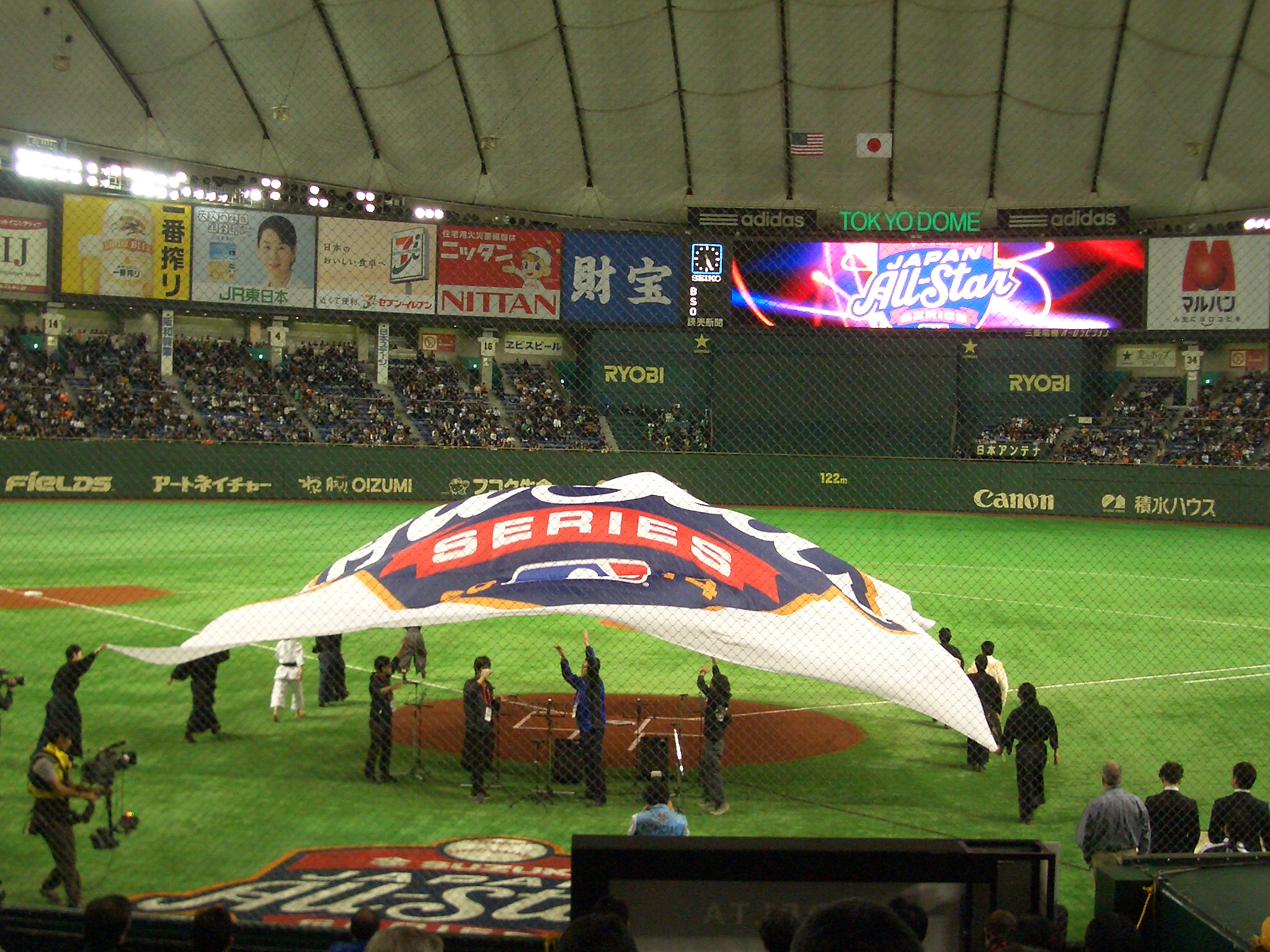
- November 14, 2014 at the Tokyo Dome
Team (Wins)	Manager(s)
Samurai Japan (3)	Hiroki Kokubo
MLB All-Stars (2)	John Farrell
- Dates: November 10–20, 2014
- Venue(s): Koshien Stadium (Nishinomiya); Osaka Dome (Osaka); Tokyo Dome (Tokyo); Sapporo Dome (Sapporo); Okinawa Cellular Stadium (Okinawa)
- MVP: Yuki Yanagita

Broadcast
- Television: NHK (Japan); MLB Network (United States)

The 2014 MLB Japan All-Star Series was the eleventh edition of the MLB Japan All-Star Series, a best-of-five series between the All-Star team from Major League Baseball (MLB) and, for the first time in series history, the national team Samurai Japan. The then-new Commissioner of Nippon Professional Baseball (NPB) saw in this championship a big opportunity for their Japanese team to gain hugely useful experience for the 2017 World Baseball Classic.

The series also celebrated the 80th anniversary of the establishment of Japan's professional baseball by holding an exhibition game of a joint team of Hanshin Tigers and Yomiuri Giants against the MLB All-Stars at the Koshien Stadium on November 11, 2014.

Samurai Japan won the series by 3–2–0 and Yuki Yanagita was named MVP.

== Results ==
Exhibition (1)

Game	Date / Time (JST)	Home team	Score	Away team	Duration	Location	Ref
1	November 10 / 6pm	Samurai Japan	0–1	(Japan) NPB Hawks–Fighters Union	2:43	Fukuoka Dome	
2	November 11 / 6pm	NPB Tigers–Giants Union (Japan)	7–8	(United States) (Canada) MLB All-Stars	3:36	Koshien Stadium	

Championship

Game	Date / Time (JST)	Home team	Score	Away team	Duration	Location	Ref
1	November 12 / 6pm	Samurai Japan	2–0	(United States) (Canada) MLB All-Stars	2:42	Osaka Dome	
2	November 14 / 6pm	MLB All-Stars (United States) (Canada)	4–8	Samurai Japan	3:02	Tokyo Dome	
3	November 15 / 6pm	Samurai Japan	4–0	(United States) (Canada) MLB All-Stars	2:35	Tokyo Dome	
4	November 16 / 6pm	MLB All-Stars (United States) (Canada)	6–1	Samurai Japan	3:01	Tokyo Dome	
5	November 18 / 7pm	Samurai Japan	1–3	(United States) (Canada) MLB All-Stars	2:58	Sapporo Dome	

Exhibition (2)

Game	Date / Time (JST)	Home team	Score	Away team	Duration	Location	Ref
3	November 20 / 6pm	MLB All-Stars (United States) (Canada)	4–6	Samurai Japan	3:27	Okinawa Cellular Stadium	

== Rosters ==
MLB All-Stars roster
Active roster		Coaches/Other
Pitchers: 38 (United States) Jeff Beliveau (TB); 13 (United States) Jerry Blevins (WSH); 26 (United States) Chris Capuano (FA); 36 (United States) Randy Choate (STL); 11 (United States) Jeremy Guthrie (KC); 29 (United States) Tommy Hunter (BAL); 18 (Japan) Hisashi Iwakuma (SEA); 35 (United States) Mark Melancon (PIT); 56 (Venezuela) Franklin Morales (FA); 53 (United States) Hector Santiago (LAA); 52 (United States) Matt Shoemaker (LAA); 41 (Dominican Republic) José Veras (FA); 67 (Japan) Tsuyoshi Wada (CHC); 47 (United States) Rob Wooten (MIL)	Catchers: 13 (Venezuela) Salvador Pérez (KC); 19 (United States) Erik Kratz (KC); 31 (United States) Drew Butera (LAD); Infielders: 27 (Venezuela) Jose Altuve (HOU); 22 (Dominican Republic) Robinson Canó (SEA); 2 (Venezuela) Alcides Escobar (KC); 41 (Dominican Republic) Carlos Santana (CLE); 3 (United States) Evan Longoria (TB); 33 (Canada) Justin Morneau (COL); 9 (Dominican Republic) Eduardo Núñez (MIN); 18 (United States) Ben Zobrist (TB); Outfielders: 23 (United States) Chris Carter (HOU); 21 (United States) Lucas Duda (NYM); 21 (United States) Dexter Fowler (HOU); 66 (Cuba) Yasiel Puig (LAD)	Manager: 53 (United States) John Farrell (BOS); Coaches: 13 (United States) Brian Butterfield (BOS); 17 (United States) Terry Francona (CLE); 20 (United States) DeMarlo Hale (TOR); 31 (United States) Mike Maddux (TEX); 47 (Puerto Rico) Juan Nieves (BOS)

Samurai Japan roster
Active roster		Coaches/Other
Pitchers: 17 (Japan) Shintaro Fujinami; 15 (Japan) Shoichi Inoh; 47 (Japan) Minoru Iwata; 19 (Japan) Chihiro Kaneko; 18 (Japan) Kenta Maeda; 35 (Japan) Kazuhisa Makita; 12 (Japan) Takahiro Matsuba; 21 (Japan) Yuki Nishi; 26 (Japan) Yuji Nishino; 14 (Japan) Takahiro Norimoto; 16 (Japan) Shohei Ohtani; 30 (Japan) Shota Takeda; 43 (Japan) Tomomi Takahashi	Catchers: 22 (Japan) Hikaru Ito; 10 (Japan) Seiji Kobayashi; 37 (Japan) Motohiro Shima; Infielders: 33 (Japan) Ginji Akaminai; 2 (Japan) Kenta Imamiya; 4 (Japan) Ryosuke Kikuchi; 3 (Japan) Nobuhiro Matsuda; 13 (Japan) Sho Nakata; 6 (Japan) Hayato Sakamoto; 23 (Japan) Tetsuto Yamada; Outfielders: 7 (Japan) Yoshio Itoi; 9 (Japan) Yoshihiro Maru; 25 (Japan) Yoshitomo Tsutsugoh; 1 (Japan) Seiichi Uchikawa; 44 (Japan) Yuki Yanagita	Manager: 90 (Japan) Hiroki Kokubo; Coaches: 41 (Japan) Atsunori Inaba; 89 (Japan) Yoshitaka Katori; 83 (Japan) Arihito Muramatsu; 73 (Japan) Hiroshi Narahara; 87 (Japan) Toshihisa Nishi; 88 (Japan) Akihiro Yano

== Live broadcasting ==
- Nippon Television, TBS, TV Asahi, Fuji TV (Japan)
- MLB Network (United States)
