= List of Tohoku Rakuten Golden Eagles managers =

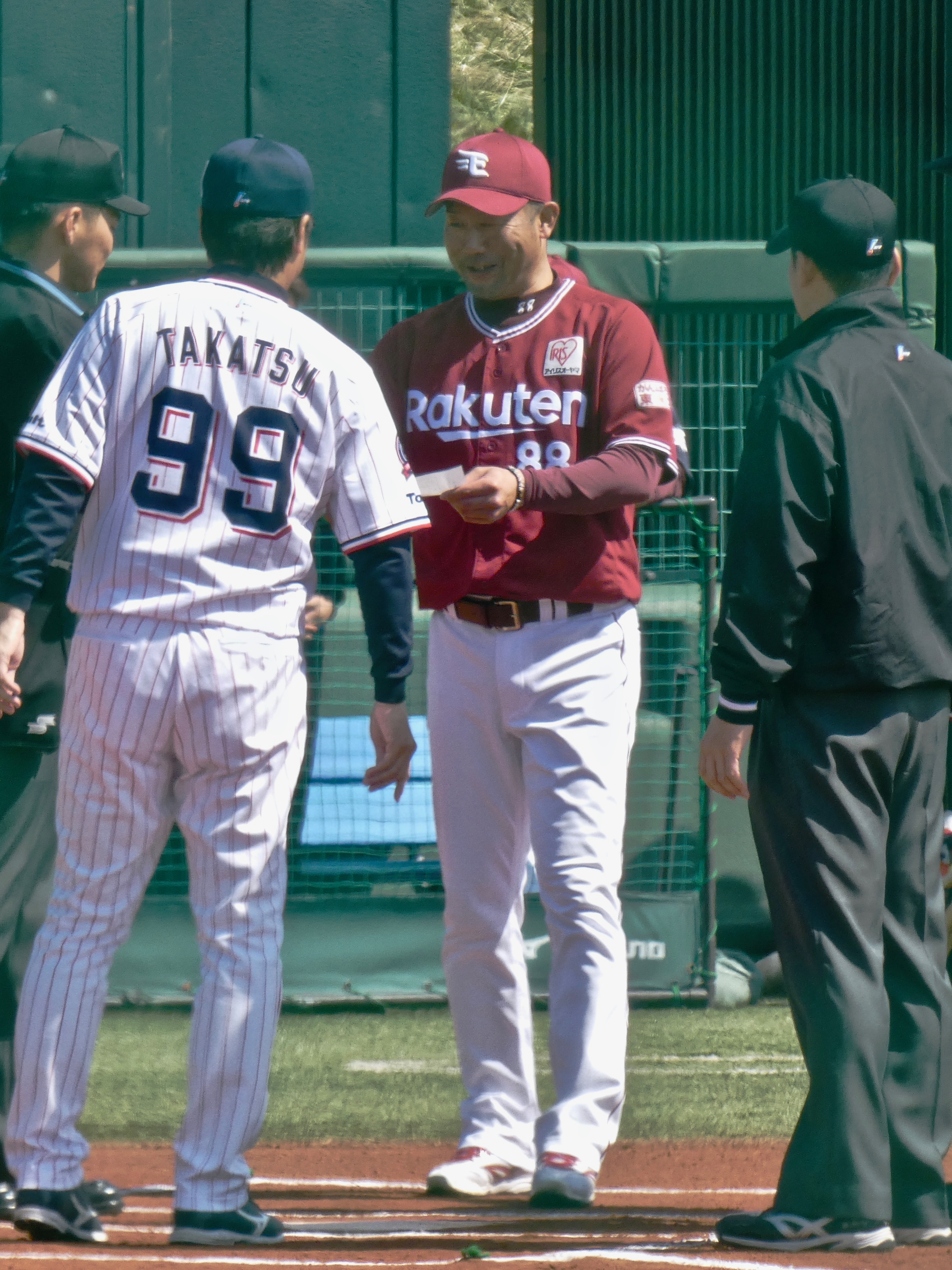
Hajime Miki is the current manager of the Tohoku Rakuten Golden Eagles.

The Tohoku Rakuten Golden Eagles are a professional baseball team based in Sendai, Miyagi, Japan. The Eagles are members of the Pacific League (PL) in Nippon Professional Baseball (NPB). In baseball, the head coach of a team is called the manager, or more formally, the field manager. The duties of the team manager include team strategy and leadership on and off the field. Since their inaugural season in 2005, the Eagles have employed ten managers. Under the franchise's first manager, Yasushi Tao, the team finished last in the PL and was the first PL team in 40 years to lose over 90 games in a single season. Despite being signed to a three-year contract, Tao was dismissed after the Eagles' inaugural season. He was replaced by Hall of Famer Katsuya Nomura for the next season. During his four-year managerial tenure, Nomura accumulated 256 wins and a .459 winning percentage. Despite leading the team to its first Climax Series appearance in 2009, Eagles' management decided not to renew Nomura's contract. Instead, he was retained as an honorary manager through the 2012 season.

Marty Brown, Nomura's successor, signed a two-year managerial contract, however he was fired after only one last-place season with the Eagles. Instead, long-time manager Senichi Hoshino was hired and signed to a one-year, ¥150 million contract for the 2011 season. After a fifth-place PL finish and the positive development of the team's younger players, team owner Hiroshi Mikitani requested that Hoshino stay on as manager for the next few seasons. In the 2013 season, the Eagles' ninth, he went on to lead the team to its first PL pennant, first successful Climax Series run, and first Japan Series title. The following season, however, Hoshino missed two months with the team because of back problems and the Eagles finished in last place. At season's end, he stepped down as manager despite ownership wanting him to return for a fifth season. Hoshino and Nomura's four-year managerial tenures remain the team's longest. Hoshino was inducted into the Hall of Fame in 2017; his copper plaque depicts him wearing an Eagles cap. Following his death in 2018, Rakuten retired his uniform number 77; this number is the only manager uniform number to be retired by an NPB team.

Hiromoto Okubo, Rakuten's farm team manager, was named Hoshino's successor following his departure. He only lasted one season, however, as he resigned after the team again finished in last place. The team turned to veteran manager Masataka Nashida to fill the managerial vacancy for the 2016 season. Nashida was the last person to manage the Osaka Kintetsu Buffaloes before they were dissolved and merged after the 2004 season and appeared to be a natural choice to manage the Eagles, the team created to fill the void left by that merger. He was able to lead the team to its third playoff berth in 2017, however, the next season he resigned mid-season in June when the club dropped to 20 games below a .500 winning percentage. Coach Yosuke Hiraishi acted as team's interim manager for the remainder of the 2018 season and was promoted to full-time manager for the 2019 season. Hiraishi was the first former Eagles player to manage the team. Despite leading the team to a Climax Series berth in 2019, Hiraishi's contract was not renewed.

Eagles' general manager Kazuhisa Ishii was looking for someone capable of rebuilding the team. Hajime Miki, Rakuten's farm team manager, was hired to replace Hiraishi for the 2020 season. The previous season, Miki led the franchise's farm team to the Eastern League championship title for the first time in its 15-year history. After only one fourth-place season, however, Ishii sent Miki back to manage the farm team and instead appointed himself as manager starting with the 2021 season. Rakuten signed Ishii to a three-year managerial contract, during which the team only reached the playoffs once with a third-place appearance in 2021. He announced his retirement as manager and general manager at the end of the 2023 season after back-to-back fourth-place finishes in the last two years of his stint. Rakuten retained him as a special director, however. Batting coach Toshiaki Imae was named as Ishii's successor and signed a two-year managerial contract. He led the team to its first interleague title, however the Eagles faltered near the end of the season and again narrowly missed a third-place, playoff-clinching finish. Rakuten then terminated his contract after only one year after players expressed dissatisfaction with Imae's managerial style. Rakuten then promoted farm team manager Miki to first team manager for the second time. Since first managing the team in 2020, Miki continued to led Rakuten's farm team, winning another championship in 2022.

== Table key ==
#	A running total of the number of Eagles managers. Any manager who has two or more separate terms is only counted once.
GM	Number of regular season games managed; may not equal sum of wins and losses due to tie games
W	Number of regular season wins in games managed
L	Number of regular season losses in games managed
T	Number of regular season ties in games managed
Win%	Winning percentage: number of wins divided by number of games managed that did not result in a tie
PA	Postseason appearances: number of years this manager has led the franchise to the postseason
PW	Postseason wins: number of wins this manager has accrued in the postseason^{A}
PL	Postseason losses: number of losses this manager has accrued in the postseason^{B}
PT	Postseason ties: number of ties this manager has accrued in the postseason
LC	League Championships: number of League Championships, or pennants, achieved by the manager^{C}
JS	Japan Series: number of Japan Series won by the manager
†	Elected to the Japanese Baseball Hall of Fame

^A This does not include the one-win advantage that league champions are automatically awarded in the final stage of the Climax Series.
^B This does not include the one-loss disadvantage first stage winners are automatically given in the final stage of the Climax Series.
^C The Pacific League pennant was awarded to the winner of a playoff series for the seasons of 1973 to 1982 and 2004 to 2006. After the Climax Series was created in 2007, the team with the best record during the regular season was named the league champion, not the winner of the Climax Series.

== Managers ==
Statistics current through the 2025 season

#	Image	Manager	Seasons	GM	W	L	T	Win%	PA	PW	PL	PT	LC	JS	Awards	Ref
1		Yasushi Tao	2005	136	38	97	1	.281	—	—	—	—	—	—		
2		Katsuya Nomura^{†}	2006–2009	568	256	302	10	.459	1	3	3	0	0	—		
3		Marty Brown	2010	144	62	79	3	.440	—	—	—	—	—	—		
4		Senichi Hoshino^{†}	2011–2014	576	279	277	20	.502	1	8	4	0	1	1	Best Manager Award (2013); Matsutaro Shoriki Award (2013); Uniform number 77 retired	
5		Hiromoto Okubo	2015	143	57	83	3	.407	—	—	—	—	—	—		
6		Masataka Nashida	2016–2018	349	160	182	7	.468	1	4	4	0	0	—		
7		Yosuke Hiraishi	2018–2019	223	108	109	6	.498	1	1	2	0	0	—		
8		Hajime Miki	2020	120	55	57	8	.491	—	—	—	—	—	—		
9		Kazuhisa Ishii	2021–2023	429	205	204	20	.501	1	0	1	1	0	—		
10		Toshiaki Imae	2024	143	67	72	4	.482	—	—	—	—	—	—		
—		Hajime Miki	2025–present	143	67	74	2	.475	—	—	—	—	—	—		
