= Koshien =

Kōshien (甲子園) often refers to:

- Koshien Stadium, a baseball stadium in Koshien which is the venue of the annual high school baseball tournaments
- Kōshien baseball tournaments, two annual baseball tournaments played by Japanese high schools nationwide
- Koshien, Nishinomiya, Hyōgo Prefecture, a neighborhood of Nishinomiya, Hyōgo, Japan named after the stadium

Kōshien may also refer to:

== Places ==
- Kōshien Station on the Hanshin Main Line in Nishinomiya, Hyōgo, named after the baseball stadium
- Kōshien Hotel in Nishinomiya, Hyōgo, now part of Mukogawa Women's University

== Sport ==
- Kōshien baseball tournaments, high school tournaments generally referred to as Kōshien
  - Japanese High School Baseball Championship, commonly called Summer Kōshien
  - Japanese High School Baseball Invitational Tournament, commonly called Spring Kōshien
- Kōshien (series), Japan-exclusive high school baseball-themed video games released for various systems
- Koshien Bowl, an American football championship held in Koshien Stadium

== Education ==
- Koshien Junior College in Nishinomiya, Hyōgo
- Koshien University in Takarazuka, Hyōgo
