= 2013 Pacific League Climax Series =

Japanese baseball series

First stage
Team (Wins)		Manager	Season
Chiba Lotte Marines (2)		Tsutomu Ito	74–68–2 (.521), 8½ GB
Saitama Seibu Lions (1)		Hisanobu Watanabe	74–66–4 (.529), 7½ GB
- Dates: October 12–14

Final stage
Team (Wins)		Manager	Season
Tohoku Rakuten Golden Eagles (4)		Senichi Hoshino	82–59–3 (.582), 7½ GA
Chiba Lotte Marines (1)		Tsutomu Ito	74–68–2 (.521), 8½ GB
- Dates: October 17–21
- MVP: Masahiro Tanaka (Rakuten)

The 2013 Pacific League Climax Series (PLCS) consisted of two consecutive series, Stage 1 being a best-of-three series and Stage 2 being a best-of-six with the top seed being awarded a one-win advantage. The winner of the series advanced to the 2013 Japan Series, where they competed against the 2013 Central League Climax Series winner. The top three regular-season finishers played in the two series. The PLCS began on with the first game of Stage 1 on October 12 and ended with the final game of Stage 2 on October 21.

== First stage ==
=== Summary ===
Chiba Lotte Marines won the series, 2–1.

Game	Date	Score	Location	Time	Attendance
1	October 12	Chiba Lotte Marines – 11, Saitama Seibu Lions – 1	Seibu Dome	3:24	32,880
2	October 13	Chiba Lotte Marines – 0, Saitama Seibu Lions – 15	Seibu Dome	3:16	33,914
3	October 14	Chiba Lotte Marines – 4, Saitama Seibu Lions – 1	Seibu Dome	3:01	33,832

=== Game 1 ===
Saturday, October 12, 2013 at Seibu Dome in Tokorozawa, Saitama Prefecture
Team	1	2	3	4	5	6	7	8	9	R	H	E
Lotte	1	0	2	1	1	1	0	5	0	11	16	0
Seibu	0	0	0	0	1	0	0	0	0	1	7	0
WP: Yuji Nishino (1–0) LP: Takayuki Kishi (0–1); Home runs: LOT: Tadahito Iguchi (1), Saburo Omura (1), Shohei Kato (1); SEI: Takeya Nakamura (1)

=== Game 2 ===
Sunday, October 13, 2013 at Seibu Dome in Tokorozawa, Saitama Prefecture
Team	1	2	3	4	5	6	7	8	9	R	H	E
Lotte	0	0	0	0	0	0	0	0	0	0	6	0
Seibu	2	2	1	3	5	0	0	2	X	15	20	0
WP: Yosuke Okamoto (1–0) LP: Takahiro Matsunaga (0–1); Home runs: LOT: None; SEI: Yasuyuki Kataoka (1), Takumi Kuriyama (1)

=== Game 3 ===
Monday, October 14, 2013 at Seibu Dome in Tokorozawa, Saitama Prefecture
Team	1	2	3	4	5	6	7	8	9	R	H	E
Lotte	0	0	0	0	1	1	0	2	0	4	7	0
Seibu	0	0	0	0	0	1	0	0	0	1	8	1
WP: Yuki Karakawa (1–0) LP: Kazuhisa Makita (0–1) Sv: Naoya Masuda (1); Home runs: LOT: Daichi Suzuki (1), Tadahito Iguchi (2); SEI: None

== Final stage ==
=== Summary ===
Tohoku Rakuten Golden Eagles won the series, 4–1*.

Game	Date	Score	Location	Time	Attendance
1	October 17	Chiba Lotte Marines – 0, Tohoku Rakuten Golden Eagles – 2	Kleenex Stadium	2:55	24,332
2	October 18	Chiba Lotte Marines – 4, Tohoku Rakuten Golden Eagles – 2 (10)	Kleenex Stadium	3:25	24,097
3	October 19	Chiba Lotte Marines – 0, Tohoku Rakuten Golden Eagles – 2	Kleenex Stadium	3:00	24,396
4	October 21^{†}	Chiba Lotte Marines – 5, Tohoku Rakuten Golden Eagles – 8	Kleenex Stadium	3:33	24,264

* The Pacific League regular season champion is given a one-game advantage in the final stage.
† The game scheduled for October 20th was cancelled because of rain and was not rescheduled because the Eagles won the series on October 21.

=== Game 1 ===
Thursday, October 17, 2013 at Nippon Paper Kleenex Stadium Miyagi in Sendai, Miyagi Prefecture
Team	1	2	3	4	5	6	7	8	9	R	H	E
Lotte	0	0	0	0	0	0	0	0	0	0	7	1
Rakuten	0	0	0	1	0	0	0	1	X	2	8	1
WP: Masahiro Tanaka (1–0) LP: Yoshihisa Naruse (0–1); Home runs: LOT: None; RAK: Ginji Akaminai (1)

=== Game 2 ===
Friday, October 18, 2013 at Nippon Paper Kleenex Stadium Miyagi in Sendai, Miyagi Prefecture
Team	1	2	3	4	5	6	7	8	9	10	R	H	E
Lotte	0	0	0	0	0	0	1	0	0	3	4	8	1
Rakuten	0	0	0	0	0	0	0	0	1	1	2	7	0
WP: Tatsuya Uchi (1–0) LP: Norihito Kaneto (0–1); Home runs: LOT: Craig Brazell (1); RAK: Andruw Jones (1), Ryo Hijirisawa (1)

=== Game 3 ===
Saturday, October 19, 2013 at Nippon Paper Kleenex Stadium Miyagi in Sendai, Miyagi Prefecture
Team	1	2	3	4	5	6	7	8	9	R	H	E
Lotte	0	0	0	0	0	0	0	0	0	0	4	1
Rakuten	0	2	0	0	0	0	0	0	X	2	6	0
WP: Manabu Mima (1–0) LP: Takuya Furuya (0–1)

=== Game 4 ===
Monday, October 21, 2013 at Nippon Paper Kleenex Stadium Miyagi in Sendai, Miyagi Prefecture
Team	1	2	3	4	5	6	7	8	9	R	H	E
Lotte	0	0	0	4	0	0	1	0	0	5	10	1
Rakuten	1	2	0	2	0	0	1	2	X	8	10	0
WP: Takashi Saito (1–0) LP: Carlos Rosa (0–1) Sv: Masahiro Tanaka (1); Home runs: LOT: G.G. Sato (1); RAK: Andruw Jones (2), Casey McGehee (1)
