= Toshiaki Imae =

Japanese baseball player (born 1983)

今江敏晃 Toshiaki Imae 이마에 토시아키
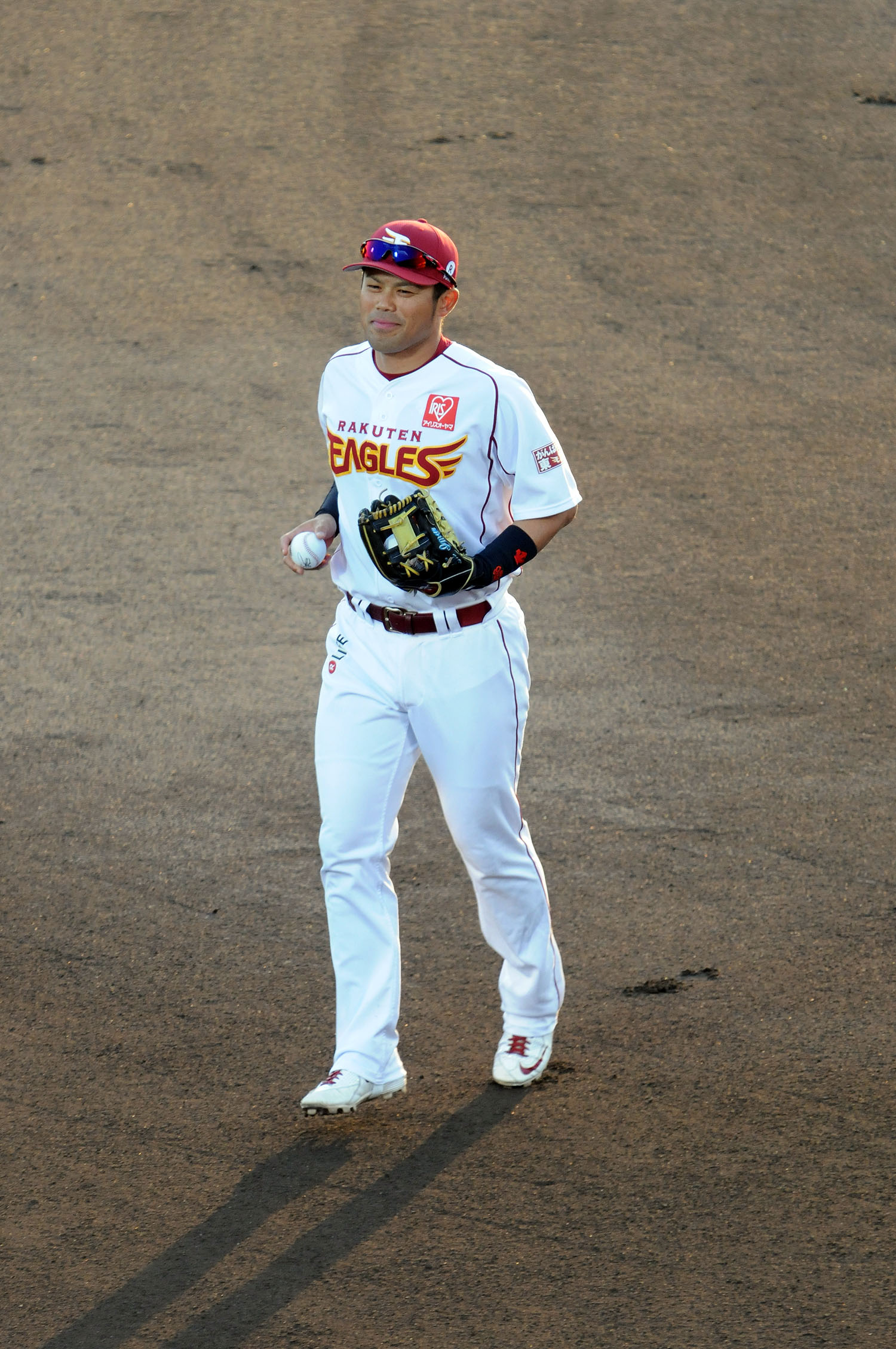
- Imae with the Tohoku Rakuten Golden Eagles

Samsung Lions – No. 99
- Infielder / Manager / Coach
- Born: August 26, 1983 (age 42); Kyoto, Japan
- Batted: Right Threw: Right

NPB debut
- April 28, 2002, for the Chiba Lotte Marines

Last NPB appearance
- June 28, 2019, for the Tohoku Rakuten Golden Eagles

NPB statistics
- Batting average: .283
- Hits: 1,682
- Runs batted in: 726
- Home runs: 108
- Stats at Baseball Reference

Teams
- As player: Chiba Lotte Marines (2002–2015); Tohoku Rakuten Golden Eagles (2016–2019); As manager: Tohoku Rakuten Golden Eagles (2024); As coach: Tohoku Rakuten Golden Eagles (2020–2023); Samsung Lions (2025–present)

Career highlights and awards
- 2× Japan Series MVP (2005, 2010); 3× NPB All-Star (2006, 2013, 2018)
Medals
Representing Japan
Men's baseball
World Baseball Classic
Gold medal – first place	2006 San Diego	Team

Toshiaki Imae (今江 敏晃, Imae Toshiaki; born August 26, 1983) is a Japanese professional baseball former infielder and manager for the Tohoku Rakuten Golden Eagles of Nippon Professional Baseball (NPB).

== Playing career ==
Imae won the Most Valuable Player award in both the 2005 and 2010 Japan Series.

He selected 2018 NPB All-Star game.

== Coaching career ==
On October 17, 2023, the Tohoku Rakuten Golden Eagles announced that Imae would be promoted from hitting coach to manager for the 2024 season, replacing Kazuhisa Ishii.

Sporting positions
Preceded by Kazuhisa Ishii	Tohoku Rakuten Golden Eagles manager 2024	Succeeded by Hajime Miki
