= Koshien Junior College =

Coordinates: 34°44′35.8″N 135°22′13.1″E

Koshien Junior College (甲子園短期大学, Kōshien tanki daigaku) is a private junior college in Nishinomiya, Hyōgo, Japan, established in 1964.
