= Hajime Miki =

Japanese baseball player (born 1977)

Hajime Miki 三木 肇
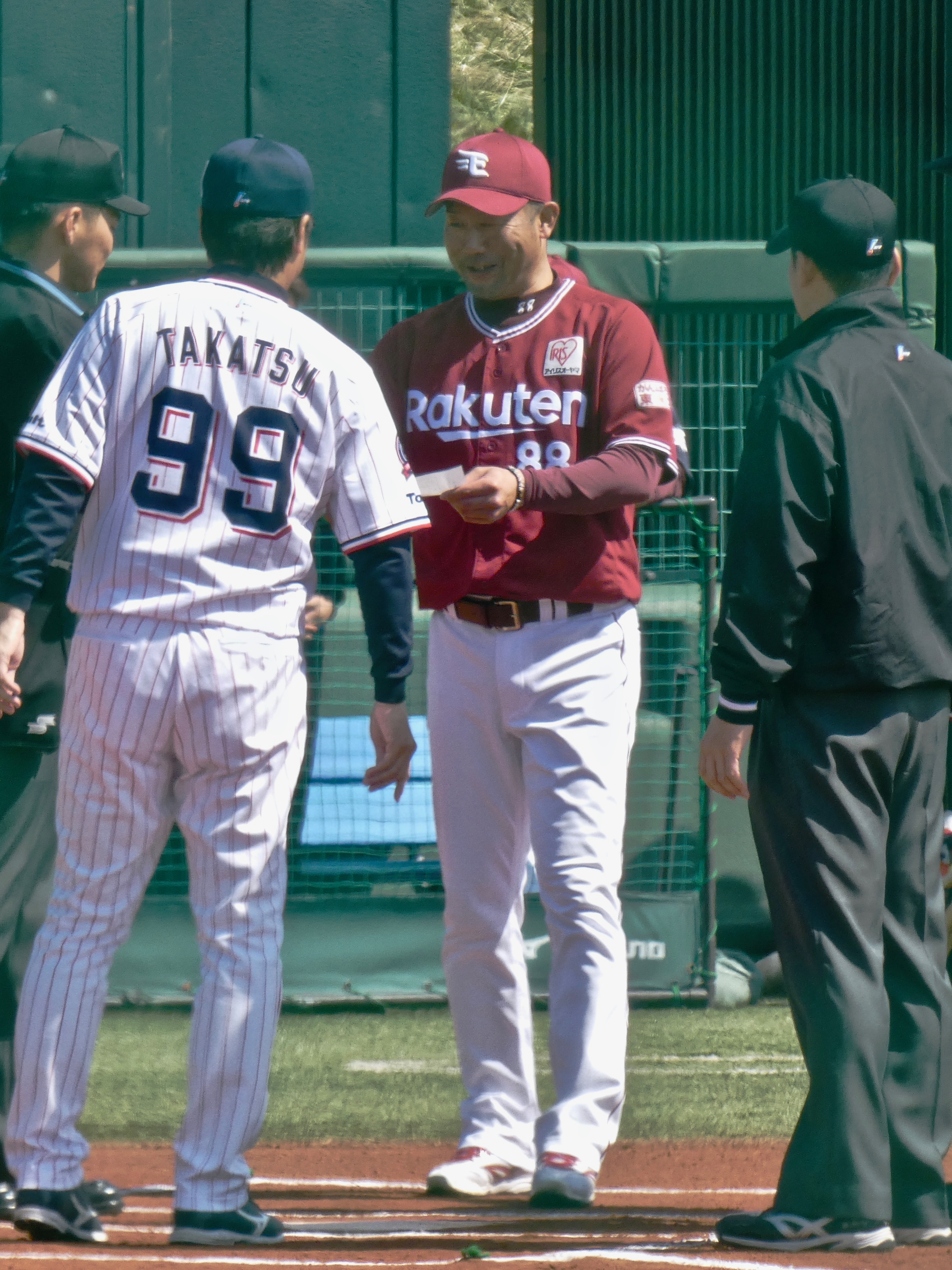
- Infielder / Manager
- Born: April 25, 1977 (age 49); Suminoe-ku, Osaka, Japan
- Batted: Both Threw: Right

NPB debut
- April 5, 1997, for the Yakult Swallows

Last NPB appearance
- June 22, 2008, for the Hokkaido Nippon-Ham Fighters

NPB statistics
- Batting average: .195
- Home runs: 2
- Hits: 59
- Stats at Baseball Reference

Teams
- As player: Yakult Swallows/Tokyo Yakult Swallows (1996–2007); Hokkaido Nippon-Ham Fighters (2008); As manager: Tohoku Rakuten Golden Eagles (2020, 2025– 2026); As coach: Hokkaido Nippon-Ham Fighters (2009–2013); Tokyo Yakult Swallows (2014–2018); Tohoku Rakuten Golden Eagles (2019, 2021–2024)

Hajime Miki (三木 肇, Miki Hajime; born April 25, 1977) is a Japanese former professional baseball infielder who currently serves as the manager for the Tohoku Rakuten Golden Eagles of Nippon Professional Baseball (NPB). He played in NPB from 1996 to 2008 for the Yakult Swallows/Tokyo Yakult Swallows and Hokkaido Nippon-Ham Fighters.

== Career ==
In 2019, Miki led the Tohoku Rakuten Golden Eagles' farm team to the Eastern League title for the first time in its 15–year history. He was then promoted to manager of the Eagles for the 2020 season with an emphasis on rebuilding the team. After one season it was announced that Miki would again return to manage the farm team.

On October 10, 2024, the Eagles announced Miki as their new manager.

Sporting positions
Preceded by Yosuke Hiraishi; Toshiaki Imae	Tohoku Rakuten Golden Eagles manager 2020; 2025–2026	Succeeded by Kazuhisa Ishii; Masato Yoshii
