= Marty Brown (baseball) =

American baseball player (born 1963)

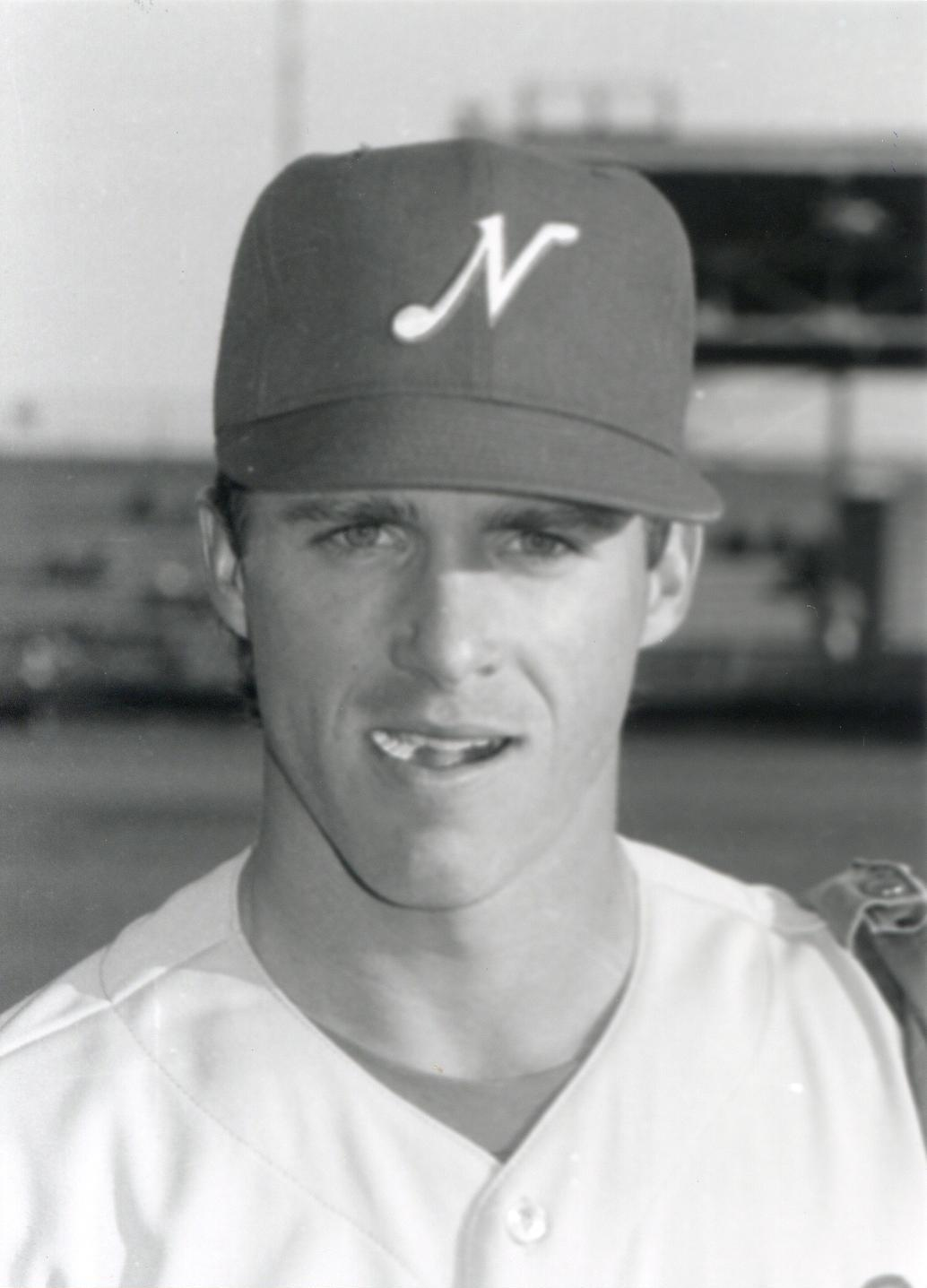
- Third baseman / Manager
- Born: January 23, 1963 (age 63); Lawton, Oklahoma, U.S.
- Batted: Right Threw: Right

Professional debut
- MLB: September 4, 1988, for the Cincinnati Reds
- NPB: April 5, 1992, for the Hiroshima Toyo Carp

Last appearance
- MLB: May 30, 1990, for the Baltimore Orioles
- NPB: June 11, 1994, for the Hiroshima Toyo Carp

MLB statistics
- Batting average: .180
- Home runs: 0
- Runs batted in: 6

NPB statistics
- Batting average: .256
- Home runs: 50
- Runs batted in: 165
- Managerial record: 318–382–19
- Winning %: .454
- Stats at Baseball Reference

Teams
- As player: Cincinnati Reds (1988–1989); Baltimore Orioles (1990); Hiroshima Toyo Carp (1992–1994); As manager: Hiroshima Toyo Carp (2006–2009); Tohoku Rakuten Golden Eagles (2010)

Marty Leo Brown (born January 23, 1963) is an American former professional baseball player and manager. He is a former Major League Baseball third baseman who played for the Cincinnati Reds (1988–89) and Baltimore Orioles (1990). He is also the former manager of the Hiroshima Toyo Carp of Japan's Central League, where he played for three seasons from 1992 to 1994, and the Tohoku Rakuten Golden Eagles of the Pacific League.

== Career ==
Brown was selected by the Cincinnati Reds in the 12th round of the 1985 Major League Baseball draft. He reached the major leagues in 1988 and appeared in 35 games over two seasons with the Reds and one with the Baltimore Orioles, who had selected him in the Rule 5 Draft in winter 1989. He then played in Japan for several years, before playing for the Oklahoma City 89ers in 1996, his last season before retiring as a player. He began his managing career in the Pittsburgh Pirates system in 1997.

From 2001 to 2002, he managed the Nashville Sounds, a team for which he played while in the Reds organization in 1988 and 1989. Brown was the manager of the Buffalo Bisons from 2003 to 2005 with an overall record of 238–193 (.552). He led the team to the International League title in 2004 after a regular season record of 83–61. He also managed the club to a first-place finish in their division in 2005 with an 82–62 (.569) record. Brown was honored by the league by being voted the Manager of the Year in 2004, and was also named Minor League Manager of the Year by Baseball America.

Brown served as the manager of the Hiroshima Toyo Carp from 2006 to 2009, and the Tohoku Rakuten Golden Eagles in 2010. He signed a two-year managerial contract with the Eagles, however he was fired after only one last-place season.

Prior to the 2011 season he accepted the managerial position job for the Toronto Blue Jays then Triple-A affiliate, the Las Vegas 51s, managing the 51s through the 2012 season.

On November 19, 2012, the Blue Jays announced Brown would return as the manager of the Buffalo Bisons, now the Triple-A affiliate of the Blue Jays. On April 28, 2013, Brown notched his 254th victory as manager of the Bisons, the most wins of any manager in Bisons history at the time. On August 11, 2013, Brown recorded his 300th victory as manager of the Bisons.

On December 20, 2013, the Blue Jays announced Brown was leaving the organization.

Marty Brown is currently the Washington Nationals' director of Pacific Rim scouting.

Sporting positions
Preceded by Katsuya Nomura	Tohoku Rakuten Golden Eagles manager 2010	Succeeded by Senichi Hoshino
