= Yasushi Tao =

Japanese baseball player and manager (born 1954)

Yasushi Tao 田尾 安志
- Outfielder / Manager
- Born: January 8, 1954 (age 72); Osaka, Osaka, Japan
- Batted: Left Threw: Left

NPB debut
- April 7, 1976, for the Chunichi Dragons

Last NPB appearance
- October 14, 1991, for the Hanshin Tigers

NPB statistics
- Batting average: .288
- Home runs: 149
- Hits: 1,560
- Managerial record: 38–97–1
- Winning %: .281
- Stats at Baseball Reference

Teams
- As player: Chunichi Dragons (1976–1984); Seibu Lions (1985–1986); Hanshin Tigers (1987–1991); As manager: Tohoku Rakuten Golden Eagles (2005)

Career highlights and awards
- CL Rookie of the Year (1976); 1x Japan Series champion (1986); 3× Best Nine Award (1981–1983); 7x NPB All-Star (1980–1986)

Yasushi Tao (田尾 安志, Tao Yasushi; born January 8, 1954 in Mitoyo, Kagawa) is a Japanese retired Nippon Professional Baseball player. He was raised in Osaka. After playing, Tao managed the Tohoku Rakuten Golden Eagles. In his one year as manager, the Eagles finished in last in the PL and was the first PL team in 40 years to lose over 90 games in a single season.

Sporting positions
New title	Tohoku Rakuten Golden Eagles manager 2005	Succeeded by Katsuya Nomura
