= Senichi Hoshino =

Japanese baseball player and manager (1947–2018)

Senichi Hoshino 星野 仙一
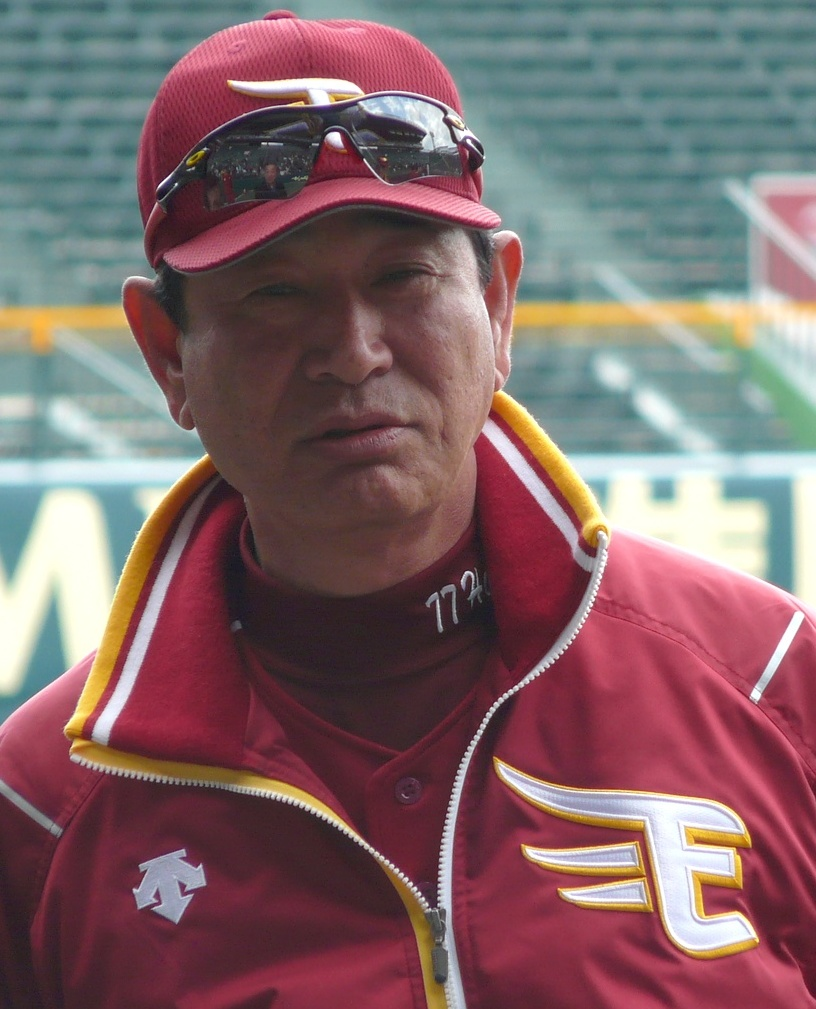
- Hoshino in 2011
- Pitcher / Manager
- Born: 22 January 1947; Kurashiki, Okayama, Japan
- Died: 4 January 2018 (aged 70); Tsu, Mie, Japan
- Batted: Right Threw: Right

NPB debut
- April 13, 1969, for the Chunichi Dragons

Last NPB appearance
- October 12, 1982, for the Chunichi Dragons

NPB statistics
- Win–loss: 146–121
- ERA: 3.60
- Strikeouts: 1,225
- Managerial record: 1,181–1,043–53
- Winning %: .531

Teams
- As player: Chunichi Dragons (1969–1982); As manager: Chunichi Dragons (1987–1991, 1996–2001); Hanshin Tigers (2002–2003); Japanese Olympic national team (2007–2008); Tohoku Rakuten Golden Eagles (2011–2014)

Career highlights and awards
- Eiji Sawamura Award (1974); Japan Series champion (2013); Tohoku Rakuten Golden Eagles #77 retired

Member of the Japanese

Baseball Hall of Fame
- Induction: 2017

Senichi Hoshino (星野 仙一, Hoshino Sen'ichi; January 22, 1947 – January 4, 2018) was a Japanese Nippon Professional Baseball player and manager.

As a player, he shined as a highlight pitcher on varying levels of struggling seasons for the Chunichi Dragons. He won the Eiji Sawamura Award for his saves in 1974 as the team won their first Central League pennant in twenty years. He pitched his final season in 1982, the same year the Dragons went to the Japan Series. He became manager of the Dragons in 1987 and managed them to a Central League pennant in 1988 before departing the team in 1991. He returned in 1996 and managed for five years, leading them to the pennant again in 1999, where they lost again in the Japan Series. He resigned in 2001 and joined the Hanshin Tigers the following year. In 2003, he led the Hanshin Tigers to their first Central League pennant in eighteen years before retiring for health reasons at the close of the loss in the 2003 Japan Series.

In 2007, he managed the Japanese national team for the 2008 Beijing Olympics. In October 2010, Hoshino was hired as manager of the Tohoku Rakuten Golden Eagles. He led the Eagles to a Pacific League pennant to become the second person to win league pennants with three teams. On his sixth trip to the Japan Series, he won the championship; he retired the following year and the Golden Eagles subsequently retired his number. He was inducted into the Japanese Baseball Hall of Fame in 2017.

== Childhood ==
Hoshino was born the third of three children in Kurashiki, Japan. His father died three months after he was born, and his mother raised him and his two sisters alone. He played baseball throughout his high school years, but was unable to advance to the Koshien baseball tournament. He entered Meiji University, and became a starter from his first year. He marked 23 total wins in the Tokyo Big6 Baseball League, including one no-hitter, but his team never won the league championship. Hoshino's reputation as a hot-headed leader began in his years at Meiji University, when he and other members of the baseball team banded together to break down a barricade set up around the school by a student protest group.

== Playing career ==
Hoshino was drafted in the first round by the Chunichi Dragons in 1968, led by manager Shigeru Mizuhara. The Yomiuri Giants had promised Hoshino that he would be their first round draft pick, but the Giants broke their promise, drafting another player instead. This betrayal made Hoshino develop a profound hatred towards the Giants, both as a pitcher and as a manager. Hoshino signed with the Dragons in 1969, and pitched both as a starter and reliever, quickly becoming the ace of the Dragons pitching staff. He led the league in saves in 1974, and won the Eiji Sawamura Award. More importantly, however, his team won the league championship, stopping the Yomiuri Giants record of consecutive league championships at 9. He was known as the "Kyojin Killer" (Giants Killer) because he seemed to pitch unusually well against the Giants. His team won another league championship in 1982, and Hoshino retired after that year. His career record was 146–121, with 34 saves.

Hoshino was an extremely popular figure during his career, not because of his skill as a pitcher, but because of his persona. Baseball fans were sick of seeing the Yomiuri Giants win the championship year after year, and Hoshino's outspoken hatred of the Giants finally gave fans a player to root for beside Shigeo Nagashima and Sadaharu Oh. Hoshino stayed with the Dragons for his entire career and was very well respected by his teammates.

== Managerial career ==
Hoshino worked as a commentator for NHK after retiring, and his popularity with both fans and players called him back to the Chunichi Dragons as a manager in 1987. Hoshino made a number of big trades, and led the Dragons to a league championship in 1988; the team lost the Japan Series in five games. He stepped down in 1991, and returned to his job as a commentator and sports writer.

The Dragons did poorly after Hoshino's departure, and he was once again called back to lead the team in 1996. Hoshino won his second league championship in 1999, but stepped down again after his team placed fifth in 2001.

In 2002, Hoshino was called to take over as manager of the Hanshin Tigers, who had been in last place for the last four years under Katsuya Nomura. He raised the team to fourth place in his first year, and made huge cuts during the off-season while recruiting free agents like Tomoaki Kanemoto and Hideki Irabu. The Tigers won the Central League championship in 2003; Hoshino's third pennant as manager. However, he frequently fell ill during games in 2003, often leaving the head coach to manage the team while he sat quietly on the bench; the team lost the Japan Series in seven games. He stepped down after the 2003 Japanese championship series for health reasons, allegedly due to high blood pressure and heart arrhythmia, but was the assistant senior director of the Hanshin Tigers until 2010. In 2007, he became the manager of the Japan national baseball team, which won the Asian Baseball Championship (the qualifier for the Beijing Olympics) defeating the Philippines, Korea, and Taiwan. However, the "Hoshino Japan" finished with a 4–5 record in the 2008 Beijing Olympics with no medals.

After the Tohoku Rakuten Golden Eagles decided to let Marty Brown go after the first year of a two-year contract, Hoshino was brought on to manage the team and signed to a one-year, ¥150 million contract for the 2011 season. After a fifth-place PL finish and the positive development of the team's younger players, team owner Hiroshi Mikitani requested that Hoshino stay on as manager for the next few seasons. In the 2013 season, the Eagles' ninth, he went on to lead the team to its first PL pennant (making it his third team that he led a team to a league pennant), first successful Climax Series run, and first Japan Series title, which fittingly came against the Giants. The following season, however, the Eagles finished in last place and Hoshino announced that he would step down as manager. His managerial tenure remains the team's longest.

== Death ==
Hoshino died of pancreatic cancer in Tsu, Mie on January 4, 2018 at the age of 70.

Sporting positions
Preceded by Marty Brown	Tohoku Rakuten Golden Eagles manager 2011–2014	Succeeded by Hiromoto Okubo
