= Hiromoto Okubo =

Japanese baseball player and manager (born 1967)

Hiromoto Okubo 大久保 博元
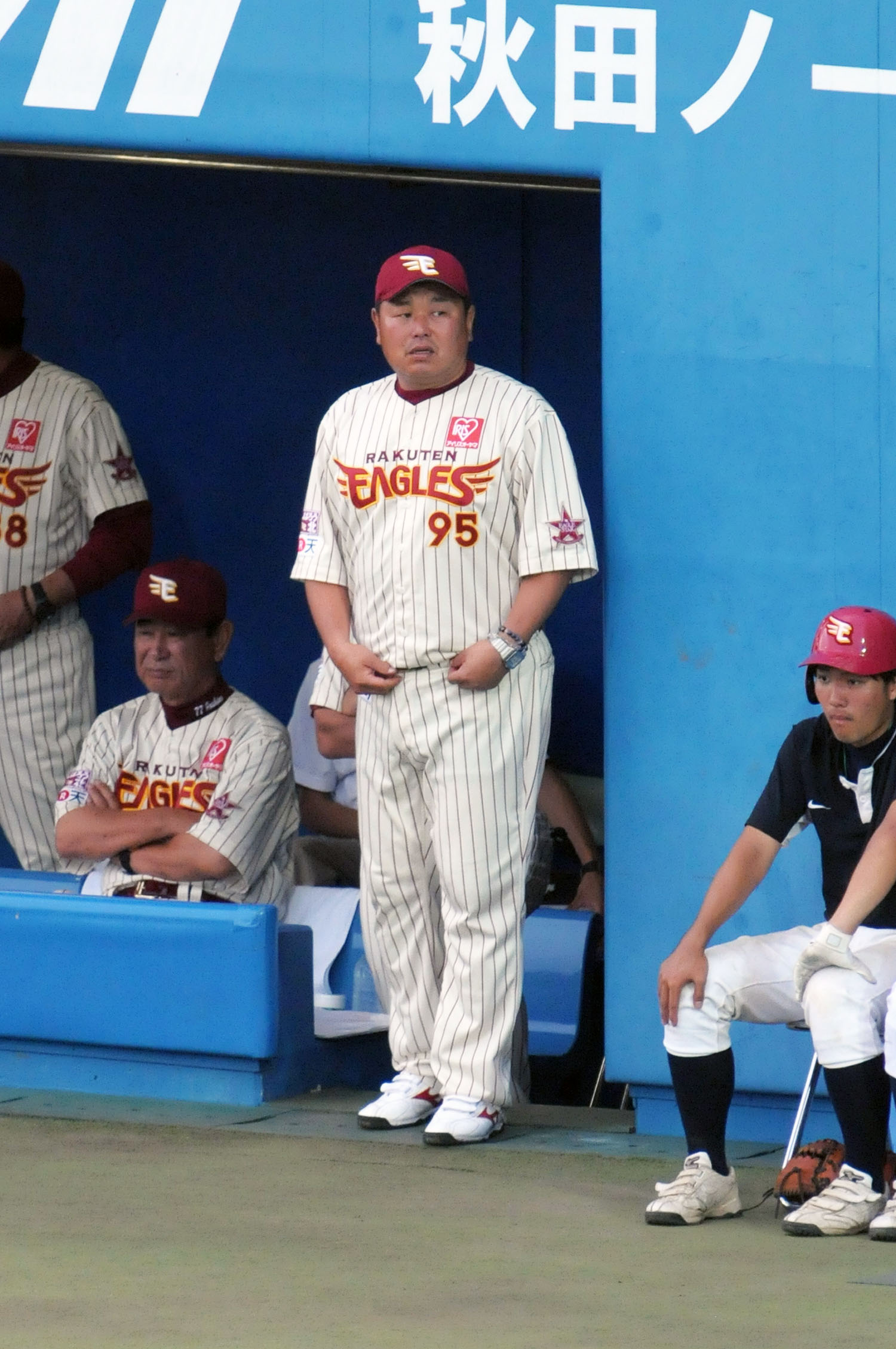
- Okubo with the Tohoku Rakuten Golden Eagles
- Catcher / Manager / Coach
- Born: February 1, 1967 (age 59); Ōarai, Ibaraki, Japan
- Batted: Right Threw: Right

NPB debut
- July 30, 1985, for the Seibu Lions

Last NPB appearance
- June 22, 1995, for the Yomiuri Giants

NPB statistics
- Batting average: .249
- Home runs: 41
- Hits: 696
- Managerial record: 57–83–3
- Winning %: .468
- Stats at Baseball Reference

Teams
- As player: Seibu Lions (1985–1992); Yomiuri Giants (1992–1995); As manager: Tohoku Rakuten Golden Eagles (2015); As coach: Saitama Seibu Lions (2008, 2010); Tohoku Rakuten Golden Eagles (2012–2014); Yomiuri Giants (2023)

Career highlights and awards
- 1× NPB All-Star (1992)

Hiromoto Okubo (大久保 博元, born February 1, 1967), nickname "Dave" is a former Nippon Professional Baseball catcher. After playing, he turned to managing and coaching. In 2015, Hiromoto was promoted from Rakuten's farm team manager to Tohoku Rakuten Golden Eagles full-time manager. He only lasted one season, however, as he resigned after the team again finished in last place. In Kobe Earthquake Dream Match 1995, he played for the Foreign Dream with registered name "Dave" because without foreign player catcher.

Sporting positions
Preceded by Senichi Hoshino	Tohoku Rakuten Golden Eagles manager 2015	Succeeded by Masataka Nashida
