= Masataka Nashida =

Japanese baseball manager and former player

Masataka Nashida 梨田 昌孝
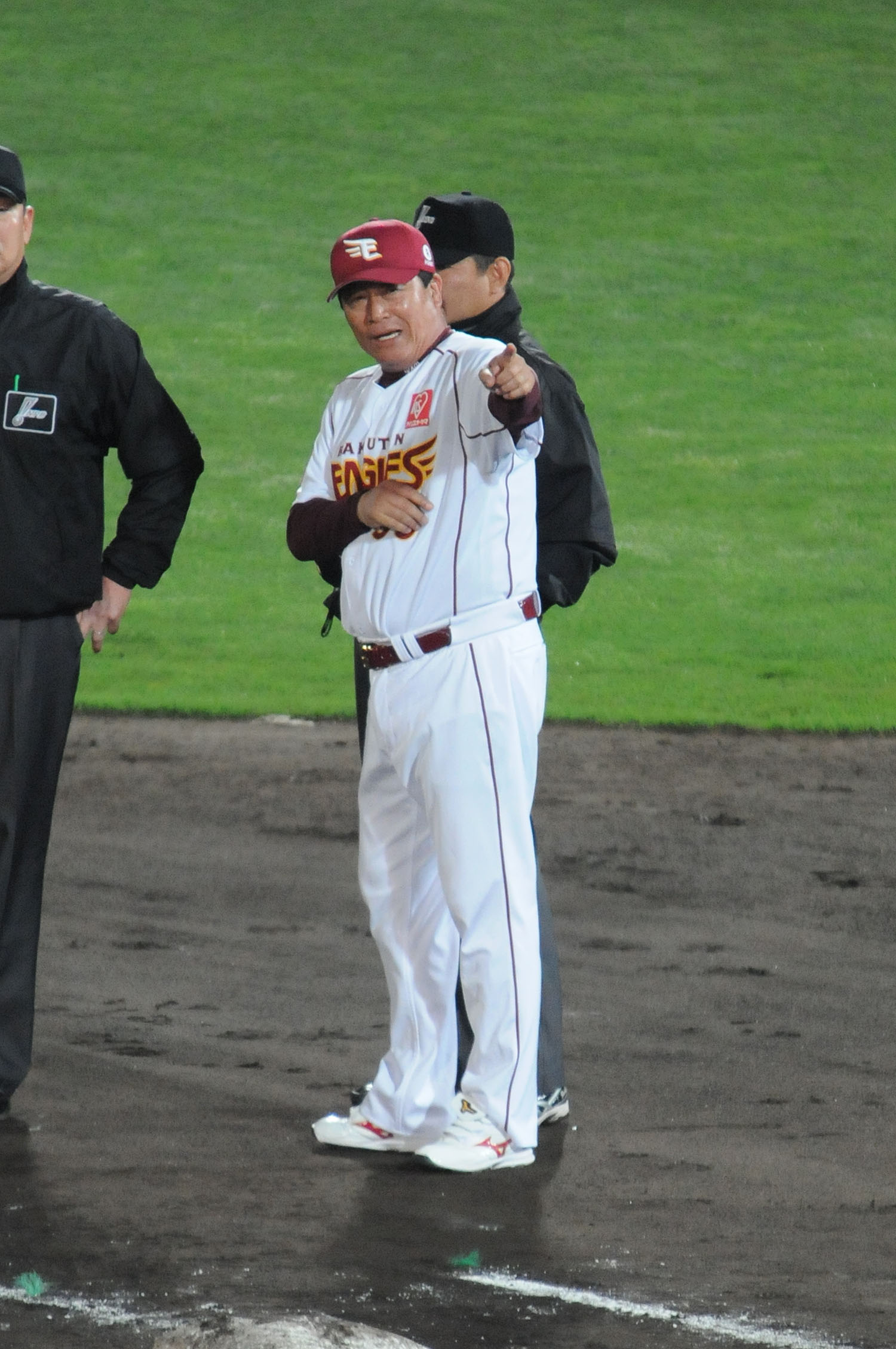
- Catcher / Manager
- Born: August 4, 1953 (age 72); Hamada, Shimane, Japan
- Batted: Right Threw: Right

NPB debut
- July 2, 1972, for the Kintetsu Buffaloes

Last NPB appearance
- October 19, 1988, for the Kintetsu Buffaloes

NPB statistics
- Batting average: .254
- Hits: 874
- RBIs: 439
- Managerial record: 805–776–31
- Winning %: .509

Teams
- As player: Kintetsu Buffaloes (1972–1988); As manager: Osaka Kintetsu Buffaloes (2000–2004); Hokkaido Nippon-Ham Fighters (2008–2011); Tohoku Rakuten Golden Eagles (2016–2018); As coach: Kintetsu Buffaloes / Osaka Kintetsu Buffaloes (1993–1999)

Career highlights and awards
- 6× NPB All-Star (1979 - 1981, 1983, 1985, 1986); 4× Diamond Glove Award (1979 - 1981, 1983); 3× Best Nine Award (1979 - 1981)

Masataka Nashida (Japanese:梨田 昌孝, born August 4, 1953, in Hamada, Shimane, Japan) is a former Nippon Professional Baseball catcher and manager. As a player, he played for the Kintetsu Buffaloes from 1972 to 1988. After playing, he went on to manage three NPB teams. First, Nashida was the final manager of the Osaka Kintetsu Buffaloes before they were dissolved and merged after the 2004 season. He then went on to manage the Hokkaido Nippon-Ham Fighters from 2008 to 2011. Finally, he went on to manage the Tohoku Rakuten Golden Eagles, the team created to fill the void left by the Buffaloes merger. He was able to lead the Eagles to their third-ever playoff berth in 2017, however he resigned in July the next year when the club dropped to 20 games below a .500 winning percentage. After his resignation, Eagles' coach Yosuke Hiraishi acted as team's interim manager for the remainder of the 2018 season.

Sporting positions
Preceded by Hiromoto Okubo	Tohoku Rakuten Golden Eagles manager 2016 – June 2018	Succeeded by Yosuke Hiraishi
