= Kazuki Tanaka (baseball) =

Japanese baseball player (born 1994)

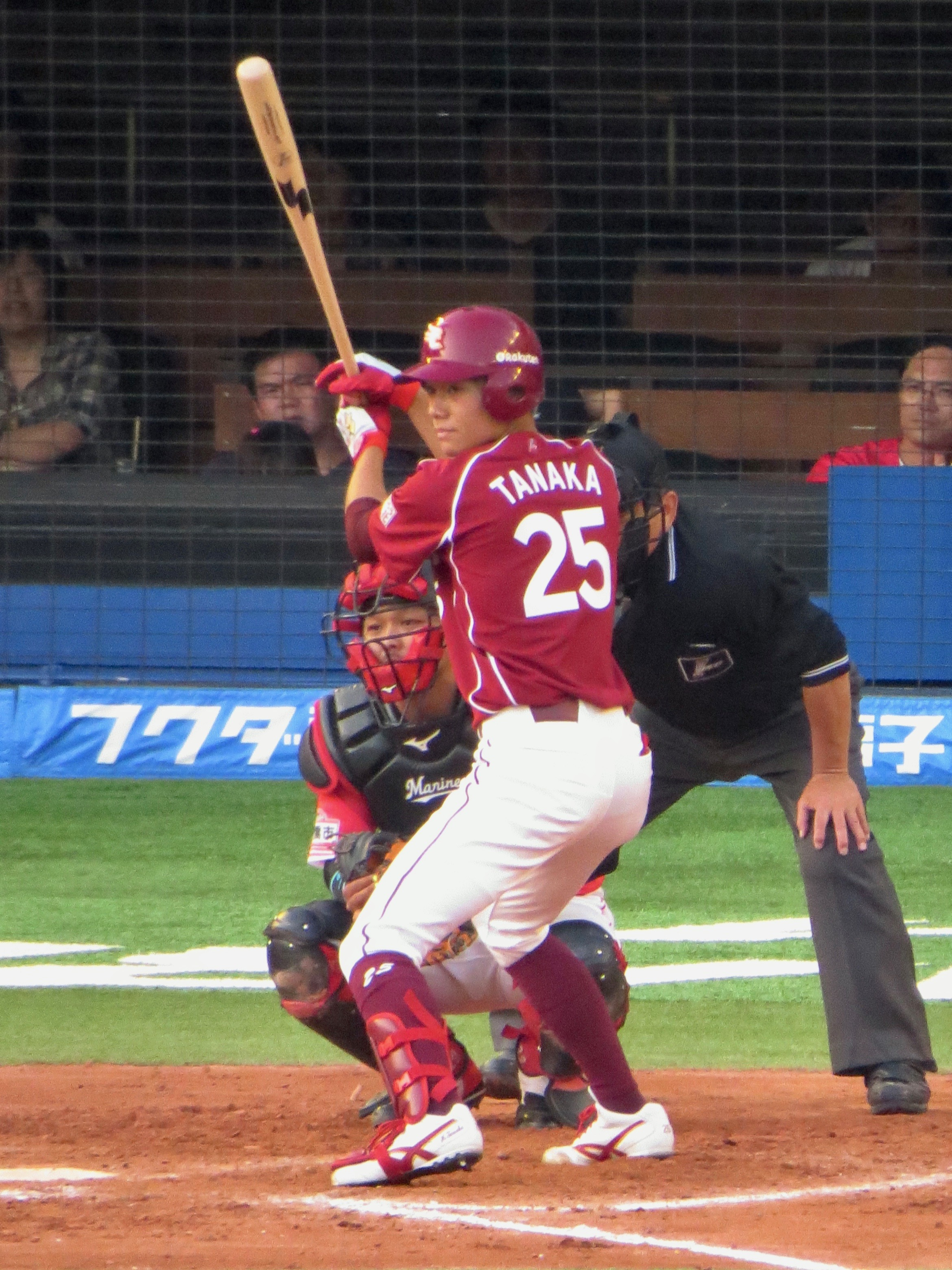
- Tanaka with the Tohoku Rakuten Golden Eagles

Tohoku Rakuten Golden Eagles – No. 25
- Outfielder
- Born: August 8, 1994 (age 31); Fukuoka, Fukuoka, Japan
- Bats: Both Throws: Right

NPB debut
- May 17, 2017, for the Tohoku Rakuten Golden Eagles

Career statistics (through 2023 season)
- Batting average: .219
- Hits: 229
- Home runs: 31
- Runs batted in: 92
- Stolen base: 46
- Stats at Baseball Reference

Teams
- Tohoku Rakuten Golden Eagles (2017–present)

Career highlights and awards
- 2018 Pacific League Rookie of the Year

Kazuki Tanaka (田中 和基, Tanaka Kazuki; born August 8, 1994) is a Japanese professional baseball outfielder for the Tohoku Rakuten Golden Eagles of Nippon Professional Baseball (NPB).

== Career ==
On October 10, 2018, he was selected Japan national baseball team at the 2018 MLB Japan All-Star Series.

On February 27, 2019, he was selected for Japan national baseball team at the 2019 exhibition games against Mexico, but on March 4, 2019, he canceled his participation due to a sprained right ankle.

== Personal life ==
On 22 November 2019, he married his partner of five years. They met as classmates at Seinan Gakuin Academy.
