= Yosuke Hiraishi =

Japanese baseball player (born 1980)

Yōsuke Hiraishi
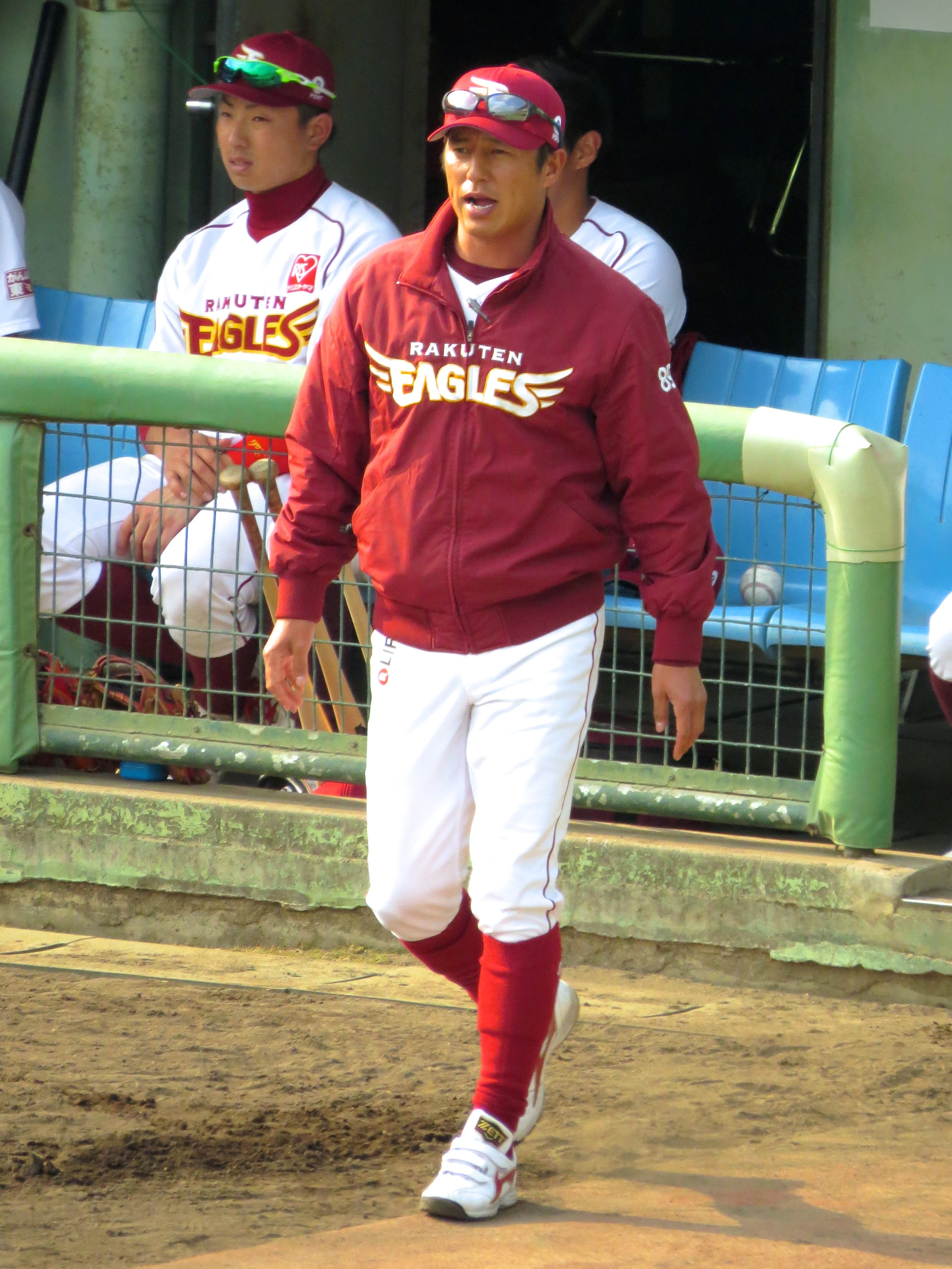
- Outfielder / Manager / Coach
- Born: April 23, 1980 (age 46); Kitsuki, Ōita
- Batted: Left Threw: Left

NPB debut
- March 27, 2005, for the Tohoku Rakuten Golden Eagles

Last NPB appearance
- July 16, 2011, for the Tohoku Rakuten Golden Eagles

NPB statistics (through 2011 season)
- Batting average: .215
- Hits: 37
- Home runs: 1
- RBIs: 10
- Stats at Baseball Reference

Teams
- As player: Tohoku Rakuten Golden Eagles (2005 – 2011); As manager: Tohoku Rakuten Golden Eagles (2019); As coach: Tohoku Rakuten Golden Eagles (2012 – 2018); Fukuoka SoftBank Hawks (2020 - 2021); Saitama Seibu Lions (2022 - 2024)

Career highlights and awards
- Japan Series champion (2013)
- Last updated on: 3 January 2025

Yōsuke Hiraishi (平石 洋介, Hiraishi Yōsuke; born April 23, 1980 in Kitsuki, Ōita, Japan) is a former Japanese Nippon Professional Baseball player.

Sporting positions
Preceded by Masataka Nashida	Tohoku Rakuten Golden Eagles manager June 2018 – 2019	Succeeded by Hajime Miki
