= Motohiro Shima =

Japanese baseball player (born 1984)

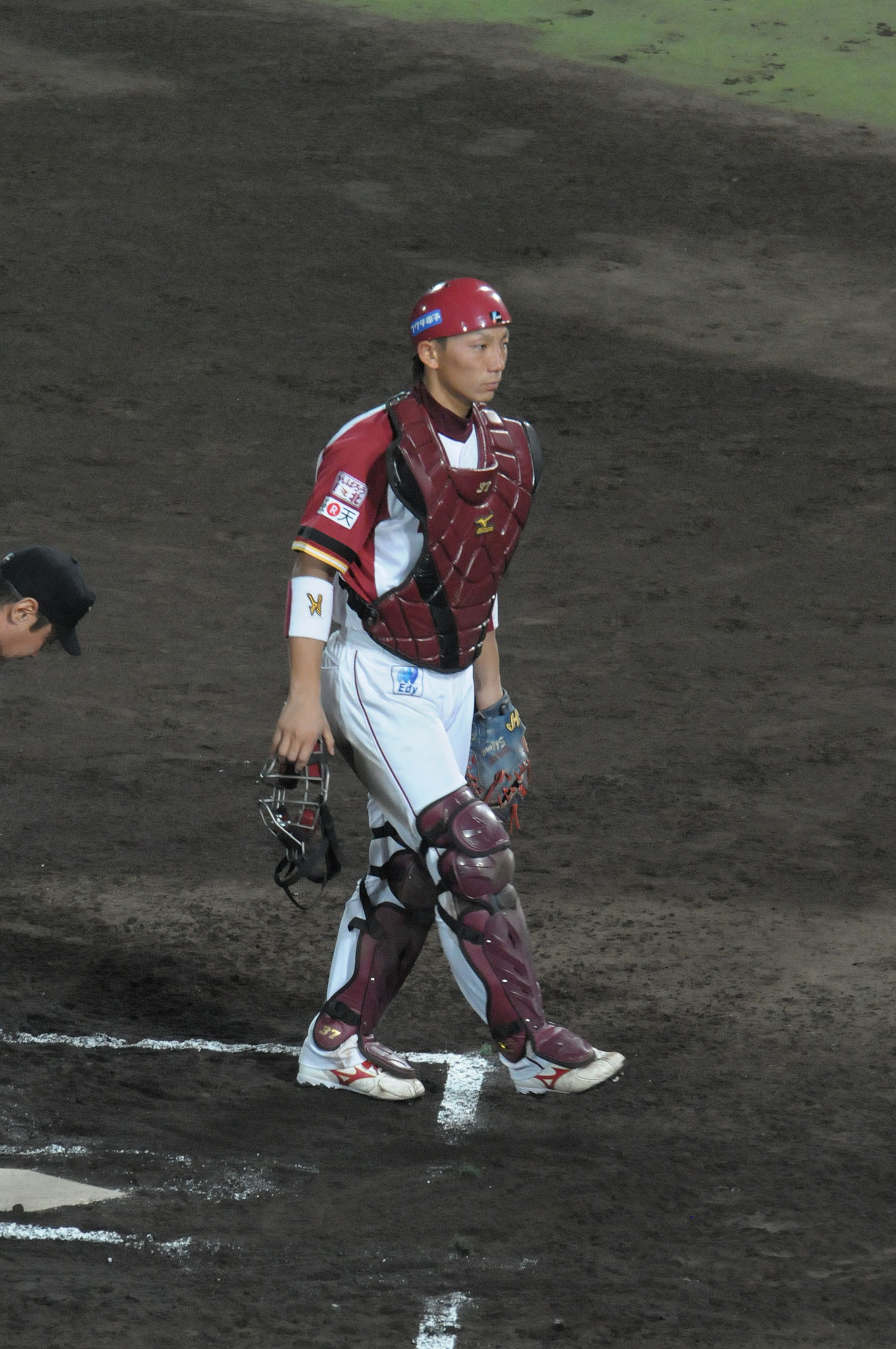
- Shima with the Tohoku Rakuten Golden Eagles

Chunichi Dragons
- Catcher / Coach
- Born: December 13, 1984 (age 41)
- Batted: Right Threw: Right

NPB debut
- March 28, 2007, for the Tohoku Rakuten Golden Eagles

Last NPB appearance
- October 3, 2022, for the Tokyo Yakult Swallows

NPB statistics
- Batting average: .240
- Hits: 936
- Home runs: 26
- RBIs: 315
- Stolen bases: 50
- Stats at Baseball Reference

Teams
- As player: Tohoku Rakuten Golden Eagles (2007–2019); Tokyo Yakult Swallows (2020–2022); As coach: Tokyo Yakult Swallows (2022–2025); Chunichi Dragons (2026–present)

Career highlights and awards
- 6× NPB All-Star (2007, 2010-2014); 2× Mitsui Golden Glove Award (2010, 2013); 2× Best Nine Award (2010, 2013); 2× Japan Series champion (2013, 2021)

Medal record

Men's baseball

Representing Japan

2015 WBSC Premier12
Bronze medal – third place	2015 Tokyo	Team

Motohiro Shima (嶋 基宏, Shima Motohiro; born December 13, 1984 in Kaizu, Gifu) is a Japanese former professional baseball catcher. He played in Nippon Professional Baseball (NPB) for the Tohoku Rakuten Golden Eagles and Tokyo Yakult Swallows from 2007 to 2022. He is currently a coach for the Chunichi Dragons.
