= Ginji Akaminai =

Japanese baseball player (born 1988)

Ginji
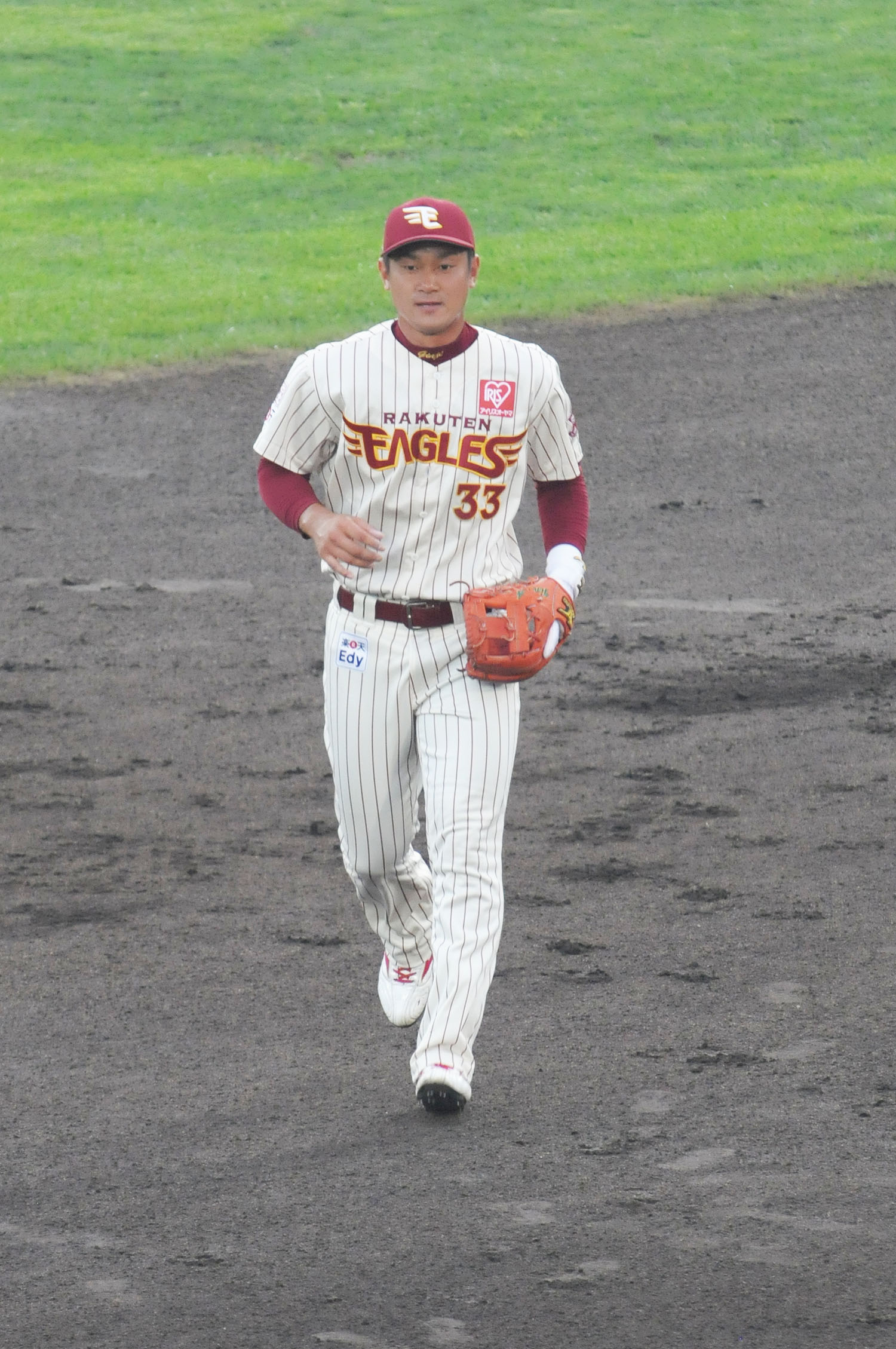
- Ginji with the Tohoku Rakuten Golden Eagles
- First baseman
- Born: February 24, 1988 (age 38)
- Batted: Left Threw: Right

NPB debut
- June 29, 2010, for the Tohoku Rakuten Golden Eagles

Last NPB appearance
- October 7, 2023, for the Tohoku Rakuten Golden Eagles

NPB statistics
- Batting average: .290
- Home runs: 28
- RBI: 471
- Stats at Baseball Reference

Teams
- Tohoku Rakuten Golden Eagles (2006–2023)

Career highlights and awards
- 2× NPB All-Star (2014, 2019); 2× Best Nine Award (2014, 2017); 1× Mitsui Golden Glove Award (2017); 1× Japan Series champion (2013)

Ginji Akaminai (赤見内 銀次, Akaminai Ginji; born February 24, 1988), known mononymously as Ginji (銀次), is a former Japanese professional baseball infielder for the Tohoku Rakuten Golden Eagles in Japan's Nippon Professional Baseball.
