= Kazuhisa Ishii =

Japanese baseball player (born 1973)

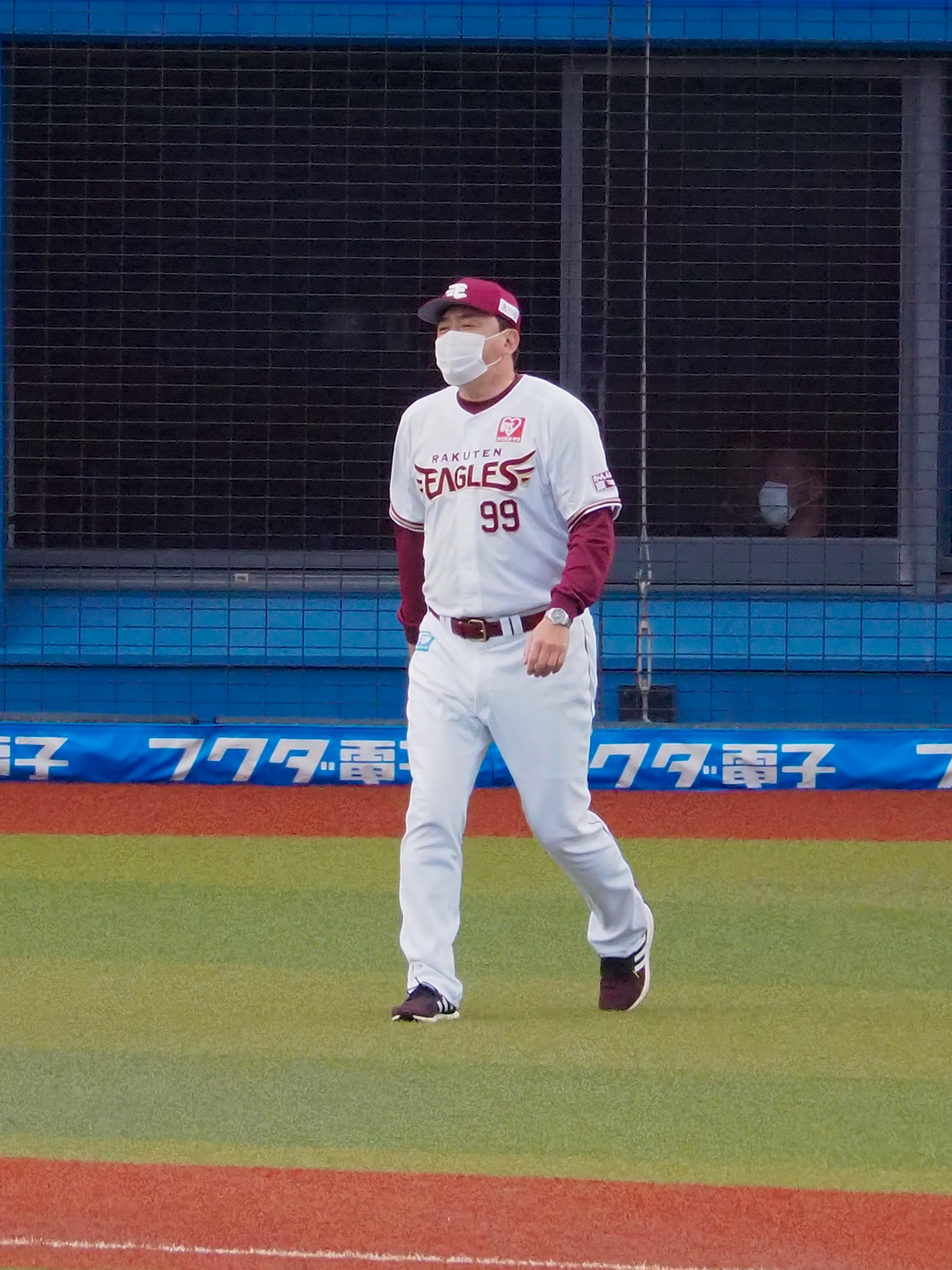
- Ishii as manager of the Tohoku Rakuten Golden Eagles
- Pitcher / Manager
- Born: September 9, 1973 (age 52); Chiba, Chiba, Japan
- Batted: Left Threw: Left

Professional debut
- NPB: June 9, 1992, for the Yakult Swallows
- MLB: April 6, 2002, for the Los Angeles Dodgers

Last appearance
- MLB: September 28, 2005, for the New York Mets
- NPB: August 14, 2013, for the Saitama Seibu Lions

NPB statistics
- Win–loss record: 143–103
- Earned run average: 3.63
- Strikeouts: 2,115

MLB statistics
- Win–loss record: 39–34
- Earned run average: 4.44
- Strikeouts: 435
- Stats at Baseball Reference

Teams
- As player: Yakult Swallows (1992–2001); Los Angeles Dodgers (2002–2004); New York Mets (2005); Tokyo Yakult Swallows (2006–2007); Saitama Seibu Lions (2008–2013); As manager: Tohoku Rakuten Golden Eagles (2021–2023)

Career highlights and awards
- NPB ERA champion (2000); 2× NPB strikeout champion (1998, 2000)

Kazuhisa Ishii (石井 一久 Ishii Kazuhisa) (born September 9, 1973) is a Japanese former professional baseball pitcher and manager and general manager. He played in Nippon Professional Baseball (NPB) for the Yakult Swallows and Saitama Seibu Lions and in Major League Baseball (MLB) for the Los Angeles Dodgers and New York Mets.

== Playing career ==
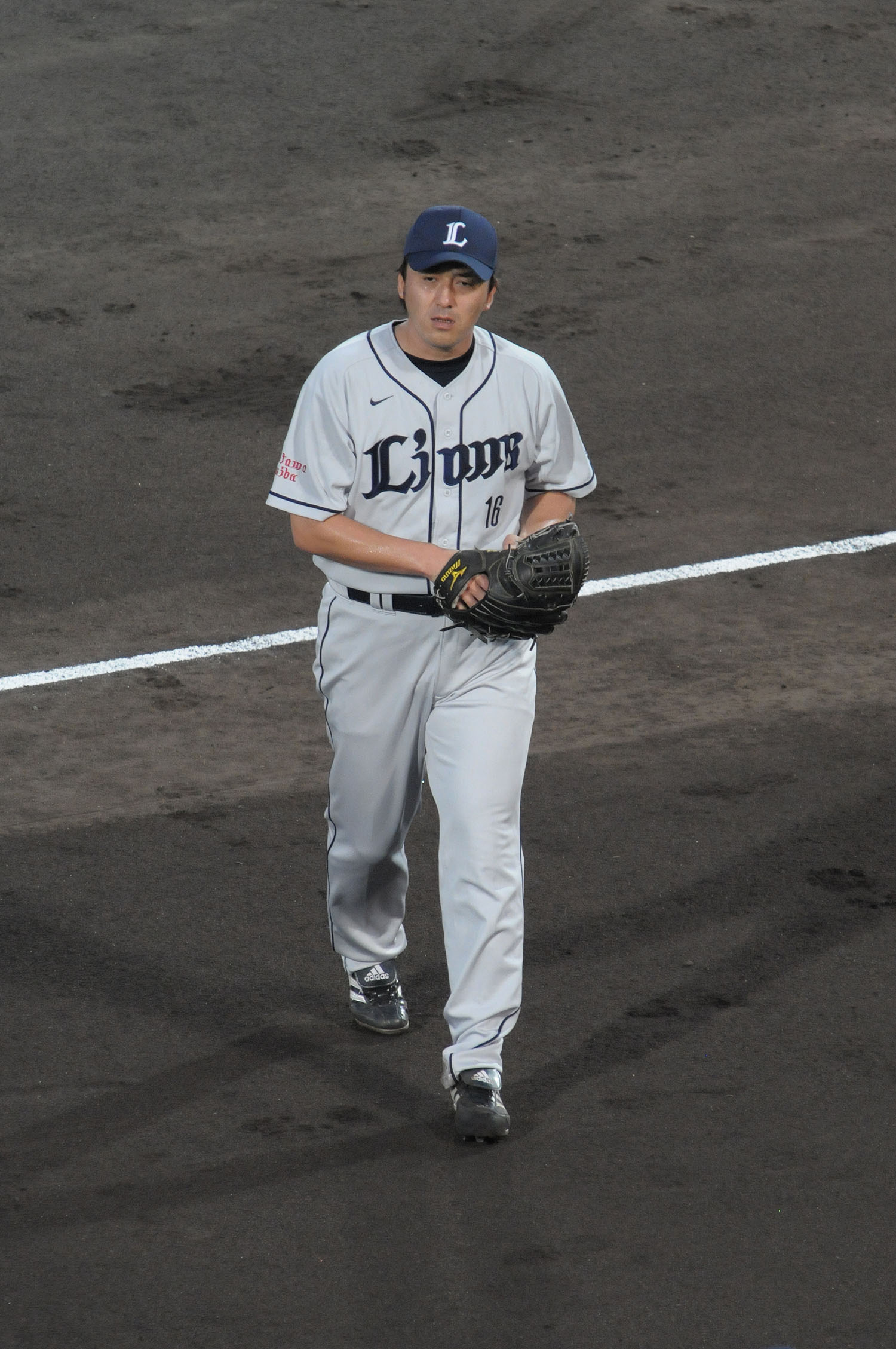
Ishii with the Saitama Seibu Lions

Ishii was selected in the first round of the 1991 Japanese amateur draft by the Yakult Swallows. He made his debut in the Central League on June 9, 1992 at the age of 18. He was a member of the Japan Series winning team that season, a feat accomplished a total of five times during his career with the Swallows. During his ten years playing in Japan, he amassed a record of 78–46 with a 3.38 ERA and 1,277 strikeouts in 1,184 innings pitched. On September 2, 1997, he threw a no-hitter against the Yokohama BayStars.

Ishii was signed as a free agent by the Los Angeles Dodgers in 2002 after the Dodgers posted the top bid for the right to negotiate with him. He made his major league debut on April 6, 2002, striking out ten batters and allowing two hits and no runs in five and two-thirds innings against the Chicago Cubs. He went on to win his first six starts and was named National League Rookie of the Month for April 2002.

On September 8, 2002, Ishii was struck in the face by a ball hit by Brian Hunter of the Houston Astros. Ishii underwent emergency surgery for a nasal fracture wherein he had bone chips removed and replaced with a small titanium plate. He did not pitch again that season. Ishii led the major leagues with 106 walks but finished with a 14–10 record and placed fourth in National League Rookie of the Year voting.

During 2003 and 2004, Ishii developed a reputation as a much better pitcher in the first half of seasons. In his three years in the major leagues, Ishii was 29–15 with a 3.50 ERA prior to the All-Star break, but only 7–13 with a 5.77 ERA after. Ishii was also known for his control problems, yielding 305 walks in 473 innings. He was among the top five in walks allowed each of his three seasons in the National League. He was also the only MLB pitcher to give up two bases-loaded triples in 2003.

In March 2005, the New York Mets acquired Ishii in exchange for catcher Jason Phillips to replace injured starting pitcher Steve Trachsel. After posting a record of only 3–9 with an ERA over five, the Mets released him the following December.

Ishii returned to Japan and played from 2006 for the Tokyo Yakult Swallows. He was signed as a free agent to the Saitama Seibu Lions in 2008.

Ishii announced his retirement on September 24, 2013.

== Coaching career ==
In September 2018, Ishii became the general manager of NPB's Tohoku Rakuten Golden Eagles. In November 2020, it was announced that Ishii would take over both managerial and GM duties for the team's upcoming 2021 season.

On October 12, 2023, Ishii's contract expired, and Rakuten decided not to bring him back as manager. Instead, Ishii was appointed to the senior director position.

== Personal ==
Ishii is married to Ayako Kisa, a television presenter for BS Asahi's "Ima Sekaiwa" ("今世界は") program, and has one child, Kanta, and resides in Chiba, Japan.
