= List of acquisitions by Rakuten =

The following is a list of investments and acquisitions made by Japanese electronic commerce and online retailing company Rakuten.

== Acquisitions ==
Date	Company	Business	Country	Value (USD)	Adjusted (USD)	Comments	References
2002	MyTrip.net	Online auction	United States	—	—	Merged with Rakuten Travel	
2005	LinkShare	Online auction	United States	—	—	Rebranded as Rakuten Marketing then as Rakuten Advertising.	
2010	PriceMinister	Online retailer	France	€200 million	€295.3 million		
2010	Buy.com	Online retailer	United States	US$250 million	€369.1 million		
2011	Ikeda	E-commerce	Brazil	—	—	Renamed Rakuten Brazil	
2011	Tradoria	E-commerce	Germany	—	—	Rebranded as Rakuten Deutschland	
2011	Play.com	E-commerce	United Kingdom	£25 million	£35.8 million	Converted into the points-based loyalty program Rakuten.co.uk	
2012	Kobo	E-book reader	Canada	US$315 million	US$441.7 million	Converted into the points-based loyalty program Rakuten.co.uk	
2012	Wuaki.tv	VOD service	Spain			Rebranded to Rakuten TV in 2017	
2012	Alpha Direct Services	Online retail delivery	France				
2012	Aquafadas	Electronic publishing	France			Rebranded as Rakuten DX in 2020	
2013	Daily Grommet	Online marketplace				Rebranded as The Grommet	
2013	Webgistix	Service fulfillment	United States				
2013	Viki	Streaming media	Singapore				
2014	Viber Media	Voice messaging		US $905million	US $1230.8 million		
2014	DC Storm	Marketing technology				Acquired by Rakuten Marketing.	
2014	Slice	E-commerce				E-commerce company that provides online shopping services and sells business intelligence based on digital commerce measurement.	
2014	Ebates	Cashback website		US $952 million	US $1294.7 million	Changed name to Rakuten Rewards	
2015	OverDrive, Inc.	Ebook wholesale distributor		US $410 million	US $556.9 million	Wholesale distributor of e-books and other digital content that serves libraries and retailers. Later purchased from Rakuten by Kohlberg Kravis Roberts in 2020.	
2016	Bitnet	Cryptocurrency wallet		US $410 million	US $550 million	Used the assets to form Rakuten Blockchain Lab, a research facility that studies the blockchain.	
2018	Curbside	Retail pickup	United States				
2020	Seiyu Group	Group of supermarkets	Japan			Joint venture with KKR, acquiring 85% ownership.	
2020	Voyagin	Online travel booking	Japan			Name changed to Rakuten Travel Experiences. Had previously invested US$3.48 million.	
2021	Altiostar	Radio access network		US$1 billion	US$1.2 billion	Previous investor of US$114 million in 2019 and acquiring an additional 17% stake for US$45 million in 2020.	

== Investments ==
Date	Company	Business	Country	Value (USD)	Adjusted (USD)	Comments	References
2011	Ozon.ru	Online Retailer	Russia	—	—	Unknown minority stake. Total of $100 million combined with other investors.	
2012	Pinterest	Social media service	United States	—	—	Led $100 million funding round with partners including Andreessen Horowitz, Bessemer Venture Partners, FirstMark Capital, and others.	
2013	Carousell	B2C and B2B marketplace	Singapore	—	—	Rakuten led a US$800,000 seed round of funding.	
2015	Lyft	Ridesharing company	United States	—	—	Led US$530 million funding round for 12% stake in company.	
2015	Cabify	Ridesharing company	Spain	—	—	Initial US$3 million investment in 2015 and additional US$92 million in 2016.	
2017	Careem	Super-app	United Arab Emirates	—	—	US$30 million in financing for the company.	
2017	MetroResidences	Real estate investing		—	—	US$4.2 million.	
