= FatWallet =

Comparison shopping website

- Type: Cashback website Online coupons
- Founded: Monroe, Wisconsin, United States (1999)
- Defunct: 2017
- Revenue: 12.3 million (2009)
- Owner: Performance Marketing Brands
- Website: www.fatwallet.com

FatWallet was a comparison shopping website, centering on a set of forums that allowed users to publish deals and rebate offers on products and services, with computer-related products and electronics most prominent in the listings. It was headquartered in Beloit, Wisconsin, and ceased operation on October 9, 2017. In 2002, the site was involved in a legal dispute with several major retailers over the posting of their Black Friday sale prices.

== Products and services ==
=== Coupons and Cash Back ===
FatWallet featured a "Coupons" section where users could find discounts from online retailers.

Before being acquired, FatWallet also featured its own "Cash Back" rebate shopping section, in which members received back a percentage of purchases made through referral links to partnered retailers. FatWallet has since ended the cash back program and now directs its members to the program offered by Rakuten.

=== Forums ===
FatWallet users posted the sale prices of major retailers, often before they were officially released in retailers' advertisements, which involved the site in a legal dispute in 2002 involving Black Friday advertisements. Several retailers, including Walmart, Target, Best Buy and Staples, have served FatWallet with "take-down" notices pursuant to the Digital Millennium Copyright Act, claiming that their sale prices were copyrighted and must be removed from the FatWallet site. In addition, Wal-Mart served FatWallet with a subpoena to reveal the identity of the users who had posted Wal-Mart's prices, but the demand was later dropped.

Although FatWallet initially complied with the take-down notices due to the fear of liability, within two weeks it reposted the prices and argued that the prices were facts rather than expression, and therefore not subject to copyright. FatWallet filed a lawsuit in the U.S. District Court for the Northern District of Illinois against three of the retailers, seeking damages for knowing assertion of invalid copyright claims and a declaratory judgment that the take-down provisions of the DMCA were unconstitutional. The case, FatWallet, Inc. v. Best Buy Enterprise Services, Inc., was dismissed. The court ruled that FatWallet lacked standing to sue for any harm done to its users for having their postings temporarily removed, and FatWallet did not assert any injury to itself that the court found cognizable.

Since its launch, FatWallet has expanded its forums to include discussion on other financial topics such as investments, banking and credit cards. The Finance forum has been mentioned in The Wall Street Journal and The New York Times referencing personal finance topics including on credit cards and 401(k) investment tips.

FatWallet launched "Best Deals" in 2009 (initially called "Today's Top Deals"), which features researched deals found on the internet by staff and members. Best Deals also features an "Expert Picks" section where staff research bigger ticket retail products like laptops, computers and HDTVs for the best value for the price, and post their endorsements each week.

== Relocation ==
Between March and April 2011, FatWallet moved to Beloit, Wisconsin, from Rockton, Illinois, in order to avoid termination of affiliate contracts with online retailers such as Amazon.com, which provide about 30% of the company's revenue. An Illinois law passed in March 2011 in anticipation of passage of the U.S. Main Street Fairness Act, required online retailers with Illinois affiliates to collect and remit sales taxes to the state.

== Acquisitions ==
FatWallet was sold to Ebates (now Rakuten Rewards) in 2011, at the same time as AnyCoupons, and later merged with Ebates to form a new company called Performance Marketing Brands. Former owner and founder Tim Storm stayed on as a strategic adviser for the new company.

FatWallet's parent company, Ebates (now Rakuten Rewards) was sold to Rakuten, as announced September 9, 2014. FatWallet was wholly sold during the transaction.

== Shutdown ==
On September 20, 2017, Tim Storm posted on his Facebook page the following:

I heard the news today... oh boy.
When I sold FatWallet in 2011, I told myself that I sold the right to complain about whatever happened after that.
I'm immensely proud of what we built—and sad to hear that it will be shutting down very very soon.
I've not been involved at all in the last 6 years, but my heart is with everyone that played a part, either with me, or after me.
It was a hell of a ride.

Shortly thereafter, a FatWallet employee confirmed that FatWallet's owner, Rakuten, would be shutting down the website, but was unable to provide further details.

On September 22, 2017, FatWallet General Manager Ryan Washatka officially confirmed the site would be shutting down, although the timeline was yet to be determined.

On October 9, 2017, at approximately 4:00 p.m. EST, the site went offline and began redirecting to Ebates.com.

== Awards ==
FatWallet was twice named one of the "50 Best Places To Work in America" by the Best Places To Work Institute and Entrepreneur magazine. It was ranked at #20 on the list for best small businesses in 2010, and #13 in 2011. Founder Tim Storm was also named as one of four finalists for Entrepreneur of 2010 by Entrepreneur.com.

== See also ==
- Cashback website
- List of Internet forums
