= IGraal =

French coupons website

- Industry: IT systems and software consulting
- Founded: 2006
- Founder: Christian Goaziou
- Parent: Atolls

iGraal is an online cashback, deals and coupons platform. It was founded in 2006 in Boulogne-Billancourt, France. It is owned by Atolls and operates in France, Germany, Spain, and Poland.

== History ==
iGraal was founded in 2006 by Christian Goaziou in Boulogne-Billancourt, France. It is a cashback website where users earn a percentage of their purchase amount back when shopping through the site's affiliate links to various retailers. The site also offers coupon codes alongside its cashback offers, including printable coupons in France.

In 2009, iGraal expanded to Germany. In 2011, iGraal reported revenue of €10 million and in 2012, they reached 1 million users. iGraal also launched its first mobile app in 2013. In 2015, the company announced the launch of printable coupons that could be used in supermarkets to save money. In 2016, M6 Group acquired 51% of iGraal. In early 2018, iGraal had reached over 4 million users in France and Germany. In 2019, iGraal launched iGraal Market, an app to earn cashback at supermarkets in France.

In 2020, Atolls (formerly Global Savings Group) acquired iGraal from M6 Group in a cash and equity deal valued at €123.5 million. Later that year, the site launched in Spain. In 2023, the site reached 10 million users in France. iGraal also launched a product offering cashback on gift card purchases in France, Germany and Spain in 2023. In 2025, the site launched in the Polish market.

Today, iGraal partners with over 4,000 sites in Europe to offer users cashback. The sites include brands like Aliexpress, Lieferando, ASOS, Hotels.com, Nike, TEMU, Expedia and other well-known brands. The company does not charge a fee for registration and the use of iGraal, as it earns money from the brands it partners with.
