= Marty Kuehnert =

American sports executive (1946–2024)

- Born: July 19, 1946; Los Angeles, California, U.S.
- Died: November 8, 2024 (aged 78)
- Education: Stanford University; Keio University
- Occupations: NPB executive, educator, author
- Organization(s): Tohoku Rakuten Golden Eagles; Sendai University

Marty Kuehnert (July 19, 1946 – November 8, 2024) was an American sports executive who was a senior advisor to the Japanese professional basketball team Sendai 89ers and Japanese professional baseball team Tohoku Rakuten Golden Eagles. He was also the team's first general manager and Nippon Professional Baseball's first foreign general manager.

== Biography ==
=== Early life and career ===
Marty Kuehnert grew up in Los Angeles, California, and later graduated from Stanford University. While at Stanford, he participated in an exchange student program at Keio University in Tokyo, Japan. While in Japan, Kuehnert met Tsuneo Harada who soon asked him to be the general manager of the Lodi Orions, a Class A Minor League team in the California League and the first Japanese-owned professional franchise in North America. Kuehnert ran the team for two seasons, during which he was named the 1973 California League Executive of the Year. He later went on to be the president and part-owner of another Minor League team, the Birmingham Barons.

=== Nippon Professional Baseball career ===
After Kuehnert ran the Lodi Orions, he returned to Japan in 1974 and became the director of sales and promotions for the Taiheiyo Club Lions, a Nippon Professional Baseball (NPB) team based in Fukuoka. While in Japan, Kuehnert continued to excel in sports management and commentary. He went on to write several books, was a sports journalist for major Japanese newspapers, and had his own TV show. In 2004, Hiroshi Mikitani, the founder of Rakuten, approached Kuehnert for sports management advice on his struggling soccer team, Vissel Kobe. After the meeting, Mikitani and Rakuten put forth a bid for a new baseball franchise as a part of the 2004 NPB realignment and asked Kuehnert to be the general manager of the time if they were to win the bid. Mikitani was looking for someone that didn't have a relationship with the old Japanese business community to run the team. In hiring Kuehnert, NPB's first foreign general manager, he hoped to bring "new blood" and "innovative ideas" to Japanese baseball. Kuehnert's approach to the team was analytic and sabermetrics-minded. He was known for his criticisms of Japanese baseball's traditionally intense training methods and hired like-minded managers and coaches. The Eagles' budget for the year was $22 million, the lowest in NPB. Following a 6–22 start, just over a month into the season, the Eagles removed Kuehnert as general manager and demoted to the role of an advisor.

=== Other activities ===
Kuehnert was the vice-president of Sendai University, a school that focuses on preparing students to become coaches. He also taught sports management and sports media classes at Sendai University and Tohoku University.

=== Death ===
Kuehnert died in November 2024, at the age of 78.
