= 2004 Nippon Professional Baseball realignment =

2004 Japanese baseball labor dispute

The 2004 Nippon Professional Baseball realignment was a series of events that occurred during the 2004 Nippon Professional Baseball season that changed the landscape of Nippon Professional Baseball (NPB). In June of that season, the Osaka Kintetsu Buffaloes and the Orix BlueWave announced that, due to financial difficulties, the two teams planned to merge into one for the start of the 2005 season. Both teams were in the Pacific League (PL), and a merger between the two would result in a team imbalance with the PL's opposing league, the Central League (CL). Soon, it was announced that a second merger was being explored between two of the remaining four PL teams. With the possibility of the PL losing a second team, discussion about possibly restructuring NPB's two-league system into one ten-team league began. PL and CL executives continued to discuss the merits of both systems until it was finally decided that the two-league system would remain intact and interleague play would be introduced in the 2005 season.

When the BlueWave and the Buffaloes first announced their merger plans, the Japan Professional Baseball Players Association (JPBPA) pledged to do everything possible to block the merger in order to protect the rights of NPB players. Leading up to a merger vote by team owners, the JPBPA filed two injunctions in an attempt to block the proposed merger and also began making preparations in anticipation of a labor strike. After the injunctions were denied, the players association decided that the players would refuse to play in all scheduled Saturday and Sunday games for the final three weekends in September unless three conditions were met by September 10: suspension of the BlueWave/Buffaloes merger for at least one year, assurance that there would be no further team mergers, and reduction of the fees required for setting up a new NPB team. Days later, the owners voted to approve the team merger. The Friday before the first planned weekend strike, the two parties reached a last-minute agreement that allowed the players to play through the weekend. The following week, team officials definitively told the JPBPA that a one-year freeze on the merger was impossible. Negotiations continued into Friday, however, no agreement was reached. A two-day strike occurred on Saturday and Sunday, September 18–19, 2004. All twelve games scheduled for that weekend were cancelled as a result of the strike. The following Thursday, with the strike set to continue during the upcoming weekend, players and team management came to an agreement. Players agreed not to stage a strike for the second straight weekend after team representatives eased the rules of entry for new teams into the professional leagues and that one would be allowed to join the following season.

In late September, two Internet services companies, Livedoor and Rakuten, submitted applications to form a new team based in Sendai that would fill the void left by the merger. As the selection process progressed, both companies were given time to discuss their team and budget propositions before a panel of NPB executives. Livedoor, who had unsuccessfully attempted to purchase the Buffaloes from Kintetsu earlier in the year, announced that their new baseball club would be named the "Sendai Livedoor Phoenix", with former MLB and NPB player Tom O'Malley attached as manager and Katsunori Kojima as general manager. Rakuten's new team planned to employ Marty Kuehnert and Yasushi Tao as general manager and manager, respectively, of their newly named "Tohoku Rakuten Golden Eagles" baseball club. In November, NPB selected Rakuten over Livedoor to create a new Pacific League team to be based in Sendai. It was the first time a new team, excluding cases of mergers or acquisitions, joined NPB since 1954.

== Background ==
Unlike Major League Baseball (MLB), Nippon Professional Baseball (NPB) does not require teams to participate in any revenue sharing strategies that would help correct revenue imbalances between teams because of game attendance and television broadcasting contracts. These issues are problematic because the Yomiuri Giants, the league's most popular team, generates revenue much easier than any other team. Daily Yomiuri baseball reporter Jim Allen, for example, estimates that the Giants account for 40% of all NPB television broadcasting revenue, while the eleven remaining teams account for the other 60%. Compounding this issue, NPB employed a "reverse designation" draft system from 1993 to 2006. Instead of teams choosing players, as in MLB, players can choose what team they would like to play for. According to former Tohoku Rakuten Golden Eagles general manager Marty Kuehnert, the teams with the most money could offer amateur players money under the table in exchange for their pledge. Traditionally, NPB teams existed to advertise their parent company, unlike MLB teams that are businesses attempting to maximize their profits. With prime-time advertising spots being expensive in Japan, corporations bought NPB teams for the primary purpose of keeping themselves in the public eye for the entirety of a baseball season. For years, potential profits were secondary. The recession of the 1990s and 2000s started to change this mentality.

== BlueWave/Buffaloes merger ==
For several years leading up to 2004, the Osaka Kintetsu Buffaloes reported yearly losses of approximately $40 million due to a drop in home-game attendance, rising player salaries and an annual $10 million charge for the use of the Osaka Dome, their home field. Kintetsu Corporation, the railway company that owned the Buffaloes, announced in January 2004 that it was planning to put the team's name up for sale after the 2005 season in an effort to make the team more profitable. However, NPB commissioner Yasuchika Negoro denied Kintetsu's request and the plan was abandoned. Later that year, Masanori Yamaguchi, president of Kintetsu, stated that the team had "no prospect of paying dividends (to the parent company)" in its current state. Meanwhile, the Orix BlueWave was also struggling to post a profit. The BlueWave's home-game attendance had been steadily declining after star player Ichiro Suzuki left the team to play in MLB in 2001, and the team finished the previous two seasons in last place. In June 2004, believing no one had any interest in purchasing the team, Buffaloes officials announced plans to merge with the BlueWave for the 2005 season. Yamaguchi saw the merger with Orix as the most realistic solution to both teams' financial problems. Later that same month, a panel of NPB executives accepted the proposed merger.

=== Livedoor attempts to purchase the Buffaloes ===
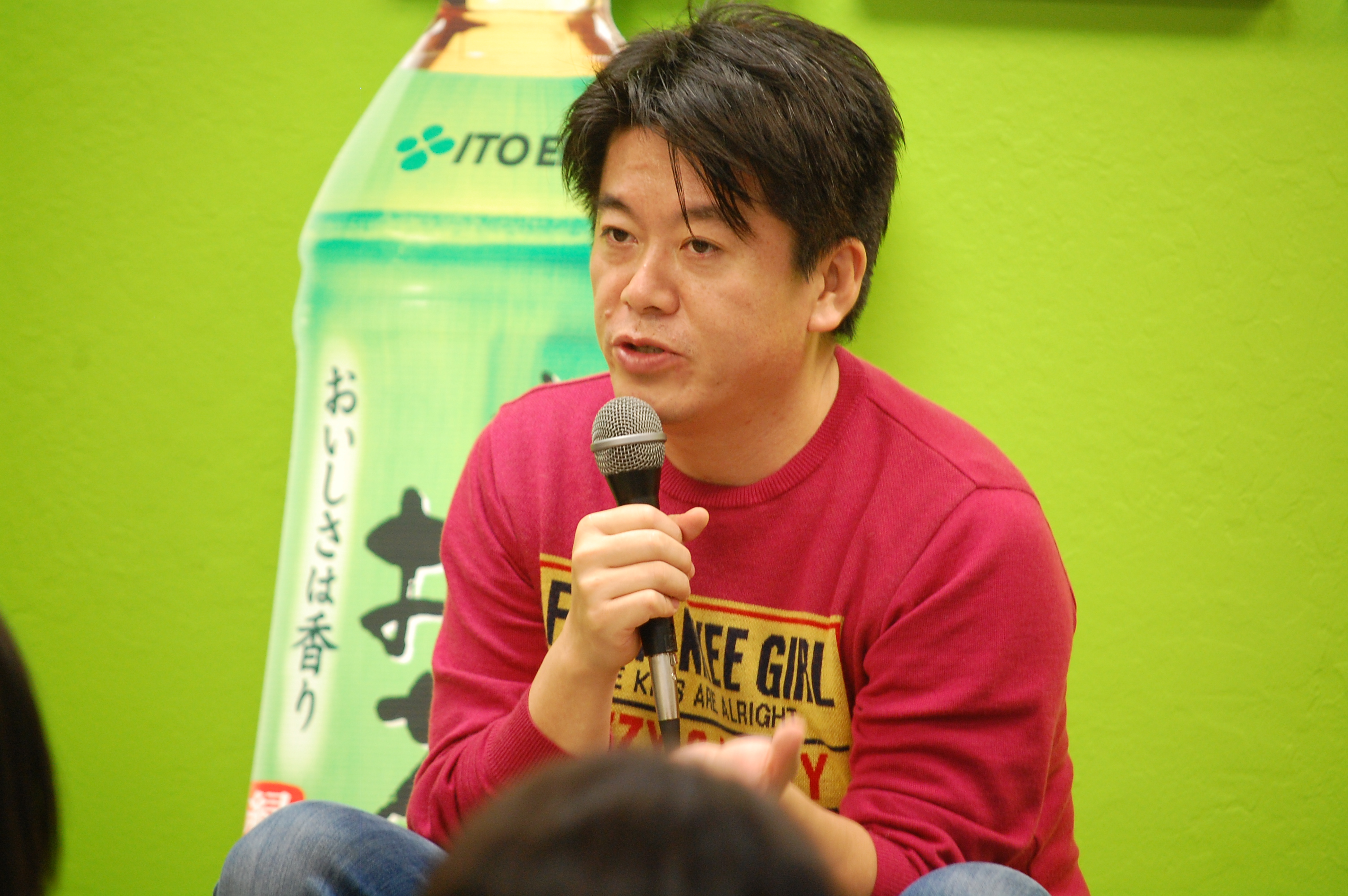
Livedoor President Takafumi Horie attempted to purchase the Kintetsu Buffaloes, but Kintetsu refused to hear the offer.

Shortly after Kintetsu and Orix announced their plans to merge their two clubs, details emerged that Livedoor Company, an Internet services company, proposed purchasing the Buffaloes. Livedoor President Takafumi Horie confirmed that if Livedoor was to purchase the team, the Buffaloes would be kept independent in order to leave the current 12-team, two-league system intact. Kintetsu quickly issued a statement, however, stating that they had turned down the proposal from Livedoor. Days later, Kintetsu emphasized this sentiment at a press conference by categorically refusing to sell the Buffaloes to Livedoor. Even though the team's players favored the proposed purchase, Yamaguchi refused to even meet with Horie to discuss the proposal and stated that, “I wouldn’t accept such an idea” and “There isn’t even a 1% [possibility of selling the team to Livedoor]."

A month later, as Livedoor continued to struggle to buy the Buffaloes for reportedly up to 3 billion yen ($27.5M in 2004), Horie expressed interest in starting a new team if he was unable to complete the purchase. He acknowledged how difficult it was for a new owner to break into Japanese professional baseball but he vowed to do "whatever [he] could" to make it happen.

=== One-league system proposed ===
Since its creation in 1950, NPB teams had been divided into two leagues: the Central League (CL) and the Pacific League (PL). The CL is the more popular of the two leagues thanks largely to the popularity of the Yomiuri Giants. In 2004, each league had six teams; both the Buffaloes and the BlueWave were Pacific League teams. The potential merger between the two clubs would drop the number of PL teams from six to five, which would then create a team imbalance between the two leagues. During a July 7 owners' meeting where the twelve team owners approved the Orix-Kintetsu merger, talk of a second pair of PL teams merging arose. At the meeting, Seibu Lions owner Yoshiaki Tsutsumi stated that another merger between two of the remaining four PL teams was being explored. Rumors then surfaced about an ongoing merger plan between the Chiba Lotte Marines and the Fukuoka Daiei Hawks. Marines owner Akio Shigemitsu denied these rumors, however he made it clear that his team was open to the possibility. Eventually, it was revealed that Daiei had explored merger possibilities with both Seibu and Lotte and talks advanced with Lotte, however no agreement was ever reached. Eventually, Daiei struck up a deal with multinational conglomerate SoftBank Group, who purchased all 14,432,000 of Daiei's shares in the team (accounting for approximately 98% of the team's shares) on November 30, 2004, for 15 billion yen. This purchase was approved at an NPB owners meeting on December 24, 2004, and came into effect on January 28, 2005.

With the possibility of the PL losing a second team, discussion about possibly restructuring NPB's two-league system into one ten-team league began. Tsutsumi and Yomiuri Giants owner Tsuneo Watanabe favored the idea of combining the Central and Pacific Leagues into one league. Watanabe even outlined a plan for a new championship competition he dubbed the "Emperor’s Cup" that would replace the Japan Series if NPB was contracted to one league. His idea involved reducing the number of regular-season games to allow for a tournament that would pit teams against each other based on their geographic location. The regular-season winner and the tournament winner would then play each other to determine a champion.

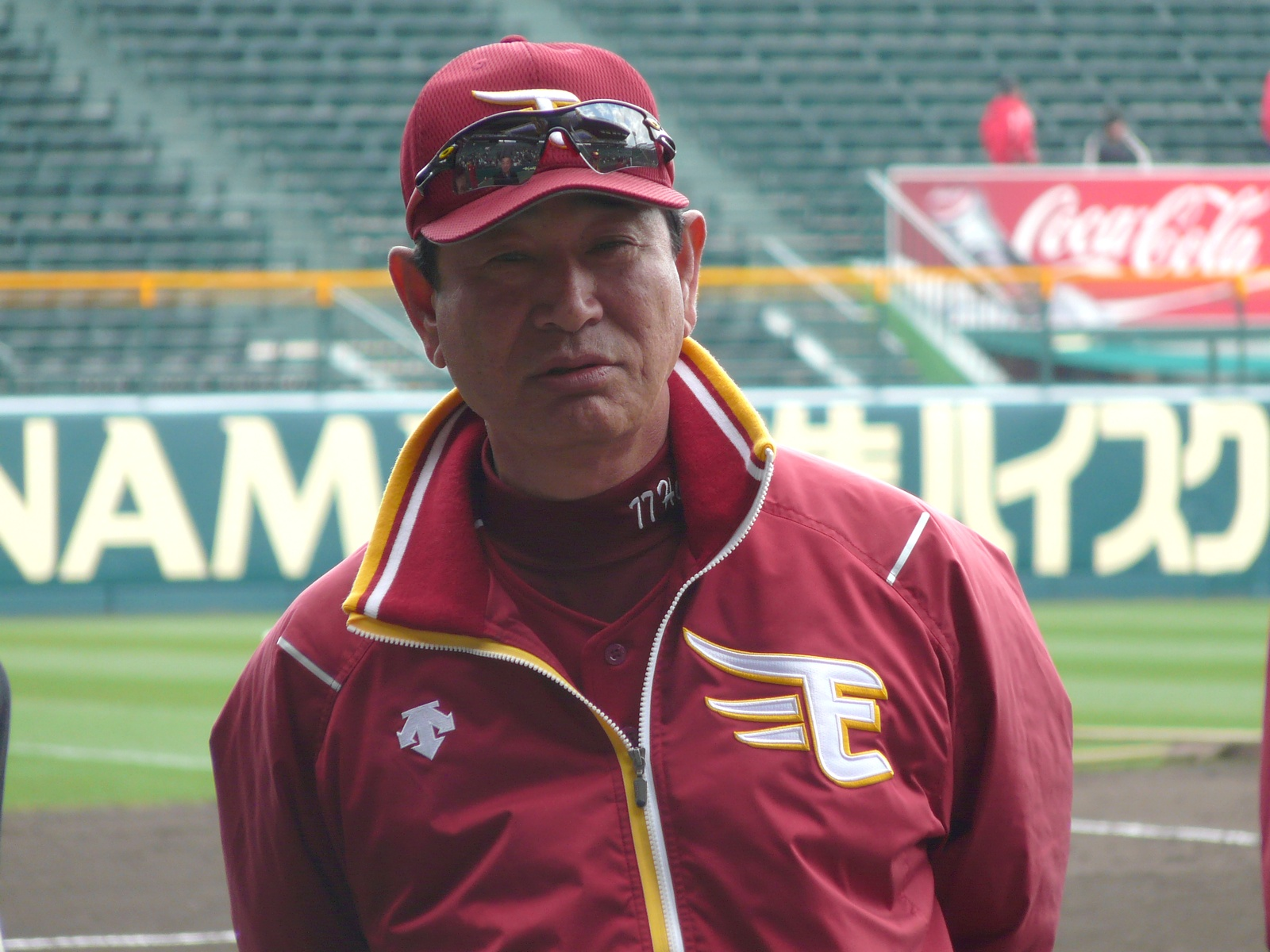
Senichi Hoshino, a senior adviser to the Hanshin Tigers, helped to convince Central League team owners to fight to keep the two-league system.

Meanwhile, senior adviser to the Hanshin Tigers Senichi Hoshino, who was manager of the club when they won the CL championship the previous year, argued to keep the current two-league format. He heavily criticized team owners for ignoring the voices of the players and fans, and it is believed that this criticism helped cause some team owners to abandon the movement toward one league. Not long after Hoshino's comments, Tigers team president Katsuyoshi Nozaki suddenly declared he was in favor of keeping the Central and Pacific League set-up and the team became the biggest supporter of the idea. Soon, the majority of the other CL teams also favored the current two-league system. After garnering the support of fellow CL teams the Yakult Swallows and the Yokohama BayStars, Tigers' executives planned a meeting with all of the Central League teams excluding the Giants to attempt to draft an agreement against the move to a one-league system. Tigers' president Katsuyoshi Nozaki proposed interleague play as a possible solution. He claimed that interleague play would allow Central and Pacific League teams to play each other an equal number of times so that it would seem that it was a one-league system, however the All-Star Series and the Japan Series could be saved. In the past, interleague play had been rejected by the CL teams because they did not want the PL teams to cut into the money they would receive from games played against the hugely popular Giants. Soon the last two CL teams, the Chunichi Dragons and the Hiroshima Carp, both expressed support for maintaining the two-league system, at least through the next season.

PL executives then came out strongly in favor of the Giants' one-league system with Pacific League President Tadao Koike citing the difficulty in operating a league consisting of only five or even four teams. On July 26, NPB held a seven-hour meeting in order to talk about the merits of both proposals, however no agreement could be reached. The issue was again discussed during a meeting in mid-August, though again the twelve teams could not agree on a solution. During the meeting, all six PL teams reaffirmed that they were looking to move forward with their one-league plan if a second team merger occurred and ultimately brought the PL's team count from six to four, though no details of a second merger were disclosed. Most of the Central League teams requested that the Pacific League teams draw up a concrete timetable that explained the details of their plan to shift NPB into a one-league system so the issue could be further discussed during the next owners meeting on September 8.

A week later, CL President Hajime Toyokura acknowledged that PL officials had informed him that they were working on specific plans for a second merger to present at a meeting a week later, however commissioner Yasuchika Negoro confirmed that nothing had yet been presented about a second merger plan and that he knew nothing about it. Citing history and tradition, Negoro also went on record to say that maintaining the two-league system was a priority for him. These comments came after meeting with Democratic Party of Japan policy chief Yoshito Sengoku and other lawmakers to discuss the state of Japanese professional baseball. Sengoku himself also opposed the shift to a single league and was leading a campaign to put forward a proposal to keep the two-league system. Public support also seemed to favor keeping the current system. In a nationwide telephone survey conducted by Kyodo News, around 74% of people in Japan were in favor of maintaining the current two six-team leagues with only 12% supporting a shift to one league.

=== Merger approved ===
While NPB team owners and officials were discussing the possibility of a second team merger, fans and players were still opposing the first planned merger between the Kintetsu Buffaloes and the Orix BlueWave. After the merger plans were first announced in June, a group of supporters of the BlueWave turned in a petition signed by 17,800 fans who were in favor of maintaining the team's base in Kobe after the probable merger with the Kintetsu Buffaloes next season. Not long after, Buffaloes players began voicing opposition to the plans as well, stressing that all possibilities of keeping the team intact should be explored before a merger is decided upon.

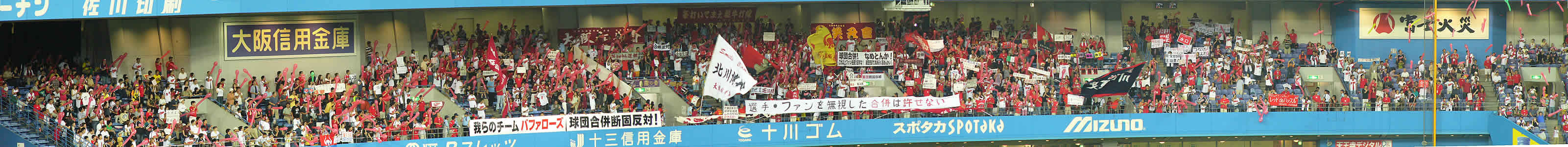
During a home game in July 2004 at the Osaka Dome, Kintetsu Buffaloes fans in the right field bleachers display signs expressing their unhappiness with the planned team merger with the Orix BlueWave. The two largest banners in the front display "我らのチームバファローズ 球団合併断固反対!" and "選手・ファンを無視した合併を許せない". These translate to, "The Buffaloes are our team. [We] strongly oppose a team merger!" and "A merger that ignores players and fans is unforgivable", respectively.

During the All-Star Series in mid-July, the Japanese baseball players' union, the Japan Professional Baseball Players Association (JPBPA), gathered and discussed the possibility of a players' strike at some time in the future if the owners refused to talk with the players. Buffaloes and BlueWave fans also assembled near the stadiums hosting the All-Star Series to collect signatures, with the intention of presenting petitions opposing the Kintetsu-Orix merger to baseball officials. By the end of July, the Giants' players association joined the Buffaloes', the Dragons', the BayStars', the Swallows' and the Tigers' to become the sixth team of twelve to hold a signature drive to oppose a move to a one-league format and the planned BlueWave and Buffaloes merger.

On August 10, Kintetsu and Orix advanced merger plans by officially signing an agreement that outlined the basic details of the planned team merger, including that the new merged club would be run by a new company jointly owned by the parent companies of the two teams, 80% by Orix and the rest by Kintetsu. The next day, approximately 300 fans protested the merger by marching with signs and chantings slogans in Tokyo's Hibiya district. Days later, JPBPA members voted overwhelmingly for the right to strike as part of a bid to maintain the two-league system and prevent team mergers. Of about 750 members of the players’ union, 98% voted in favor of strike rights. Fewer than ten members opposed striking. The Japan Trade Union Confederation (RENGO) also supported the association by giving advice on how to set up a strike as well as labor-management negotiation strategies and how to effectively circulate petitions.

The Kintetsu and Orix merger plan was finalized in late August when the two teams signed a formal contract. That same day, JPBPA filed for an injunction against the planned merger with the Tokyo District Court. The suit was filed by the JPBPA head Atsuya Furuta as well as Koichi Isobe and Takashi Miwa, who represented the players of Kintetsu and Orix, respectively. The association decided to take legal action after NPB officials either turned down or ignored a series of demands made by the JPBPA. These demands included establishing a special committee to handle contractual issues for the players affected by the merger, including club management and players’ representatives in any decision-making processes of such a committee, and to postpone the merger for at least one year to reassess its advisability. The documents filed with the court outlined the association's demands to establish a special committee that would meet and adopt resolutions before any decisions were made and to allow the JPBPA to conduct collective negotiations on a range of merger-related issues, as a large number of players would be expected to lose their jobs should the merger go through.

Meanwhile, Pacific League President Koike quoted Giants president Watanabe as telling him that if the number of teams in the PL was reduced to four through team mergers, both the Central League and Pacific League should have five teams each, with the Giants moving to the PL to equalize the number of teams in each league. Commissioner Negoro addressed these statements, saying that NPB was not considering having the Giants switch leagues. He also stated that no decision had been made concerning whether Japanese baseball would contract to one league or keep the two-league system in some form, but that both options were being explored. Lions owner Tsutsumi, who had first revealed plans of a second PL team merger plan back in July, then denied recent reports that his club would merge with the Marines but offered no other details about the rumored second merger.

NPB officials agreed to postpone the official merger vote that was planned to occur on September 8 pending a judgement on the JPBA's injunction request, however the Tokyo District Court rejected the association's request one week after it was submitted and the vote proceeded as planned. Following the District Court's decision, the association immediately appealed to the Tokyo High Court, however this appeal was also rejected several days later. The same day the association lost their injunction appeal, NPB executives met to discuss the merger and league realignment. The twelve owners voted and approved the Buffaloes and BlueWave merger plan, leaving the PL with five teams instead of six for the 2005 season. They also agreed to maintain the two-league format but would explore the idea of introducing interleague games for the next season. And finally, while they also agreed to reconsider the requirements for new teams to enter the leagues, they decided that they could not put off the merger plans for another season because of the dire financial circumstances of the Buffaloes, thus setting the stage for a player strike.

== Players strike ==
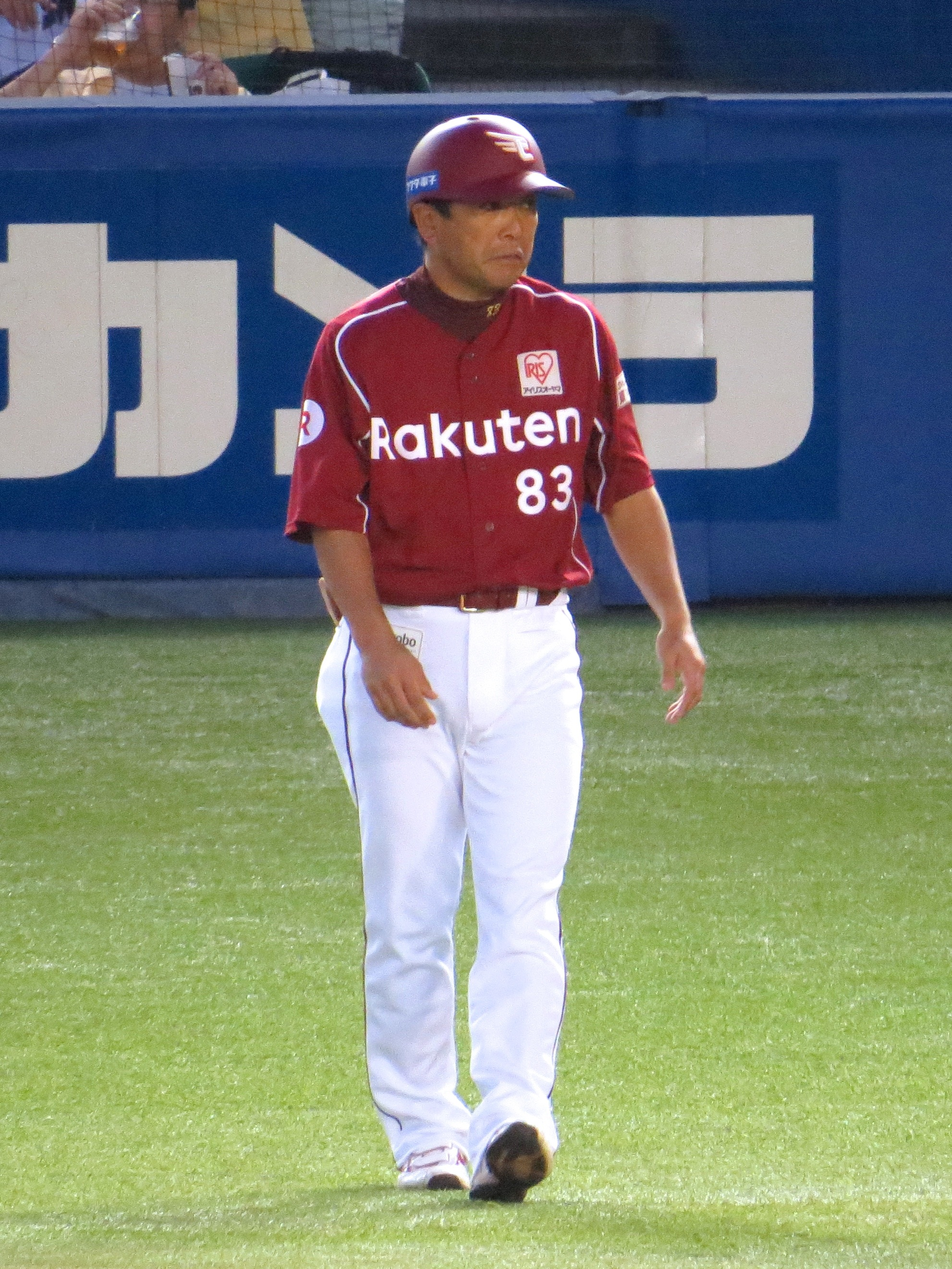
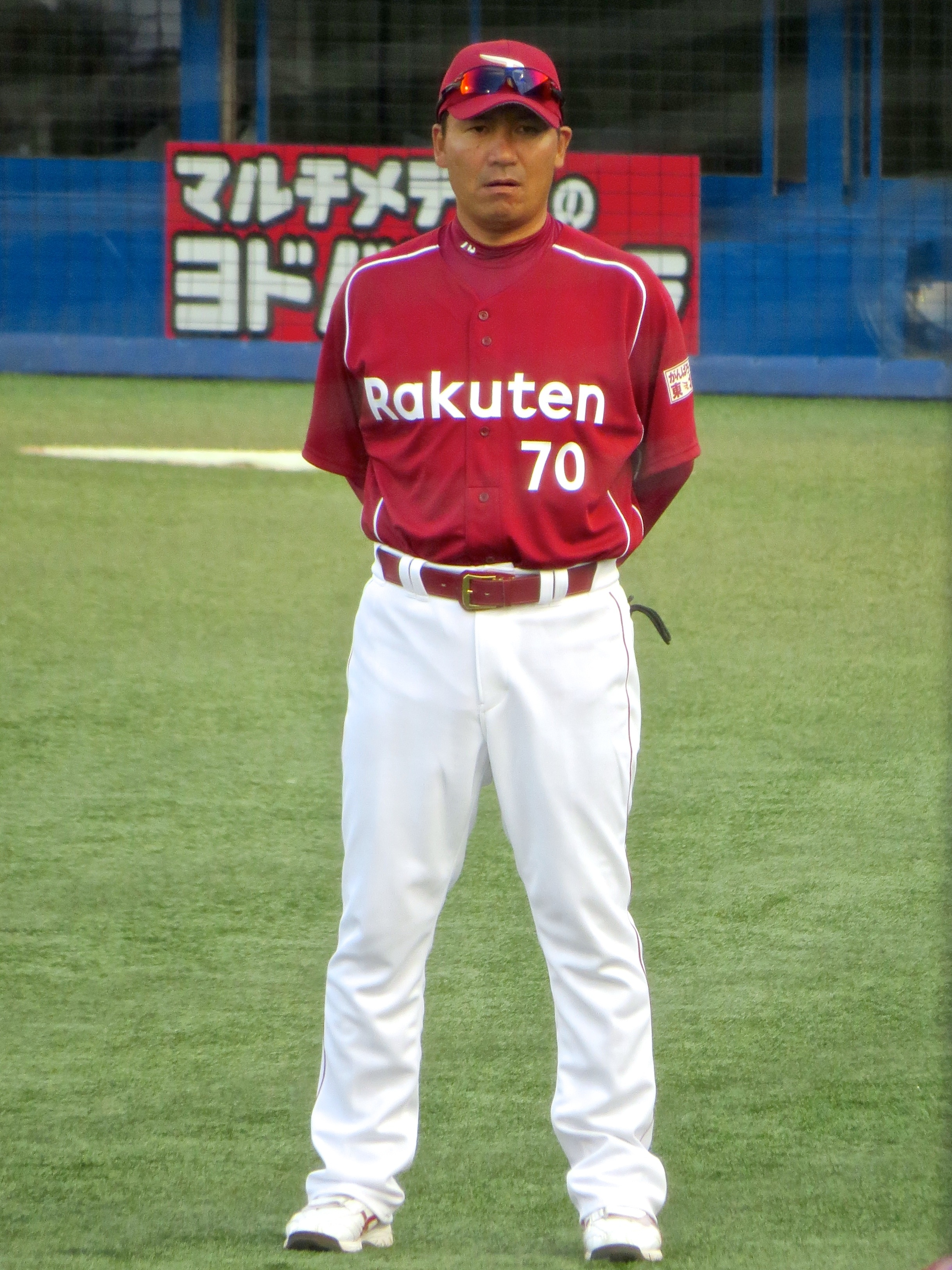
Koichi Isobe (left) and Takashi Miwa were the JPBPA team representatives of the Kintetsu Buffaloes and Orix BlueWave, respectively.

When the Orix BlueWave and the Osaka Kintetsu Buffaloes announced their merger plans in June, JPBPA head and then-Yakult Swallows catcher Furuta vowed that his organization would do everything possible to block the merger in order to protect the rights of the 752 professional players in NPB. It was estimated that up to 100 players and team personnel could lose their jobs as a result of the merger. Furuta claimed that "Japanese baseball [was] at a crossroads” and it was "the most important time in [their] 70-year history". In addition to submitting a court injunction to block the proposed merger, the association received the support of the Japan Fair Trade Commission (JFTC) leading up to the merger vote. The JFTC called on NPB to offer up a clear explanation as to why Livedoor's bid to buy the Buffaloes wasn't considered. Anticipating the possibility of a player strike, the JPBPA also consulted with the Major League Baseball Players Association on how to proceed. According to Furuta, however, Japanese baseball's possible strike situation was different from MLB's 1994 strike because the Japanese players had the support of their fans. By September, close to one million fans had signed petitions opposing the merger.

Furuta was skeptical of the losses reported by the teams but conceded that if the losses were accurate then player salaries would have to be adjusted accordingly. The players' association made several suggestions to improve the teams' financial situations, including relaxing the rules on how much player salaries could be reduced as well as proposing a luxury tax that would result in the reduction of player salaries. Furthermore, the JPBPA supported the two-league system, proposed interleague play and a fairer distribution of television broadcast revenue.

Days before the planned merger vote, the players' association decided that they would refuse to play all games scheduled on Saturdays and Sundays for the rest of September unless three conditions were met by September 10: suspension of the BlueWave/Buffaloes merger for at least one year, assurance that there would be no further team mergers, and reduction of the fees required for setting up a new NPB team. Despite this ultimatum, owners went ahead and approved the merger two days later. The next day, team management and players met for six hours in Osaka looking to agree on a compromise deal in an attempt to avert a strike the next day, but failed to reach an agreement. On Friday, the next day and the final day before the proposed strike, a last-minute agreement was reach between the two parties that allowed the players to play through the weekend. The JBLPA conceded some demands once team representatives assured the players that there would be no further mergers and that negotiations on the other two issues would continue until September 17, the next day the players could strike under the association's plans.

On the following Thursday, during on-going negotiations, team officials definitively told the JPBPA that a one-year freeze on the BlueWave/Buffaloes merger, one of the three demands set by the association to avoid a strike, was impossible. Two Internet service companies had applied to start new Japanese baseball teams in the wake of the professional leagues losing a team, however NPB representatives maintained that the 2006 season would be the earliest a new team could enter. The players wanted any new teams ready for the next season. Negotiations continued into Friday and lasted four hours past the 5 pm deadline, however, no agreement was reached and the players proceeded to stage the first and only strike in Japanese professional baseball history. The two-day strike occurred on Saturday and Sunday, September 18–19, 2004. All twelve games scheduled for that weekend were cancelled as a result of the strike. In place of these games, players instead staged a variety of events at stadiums and other venues. These events included autograph sessions, on-field baseball training, and opportunities for fans to meet players.

The following Thursday, with the strike set to continue the during the upcoming weekend, players and management came to an agreement. Players agreed not to stage a strike for the second straight weekend after team representatives eased the rules of entry for new teams into the professional leagues and that one would be allowed to join the following season. The two-day strike caused economic losses totaling approximately 1.89 billion yen (17.2 million in 2004), according to researchers from Osaka Prefecture University. Estimated attendance at the 12 games would have generated 1.68 billion yen through ticket, food and drink sales. Additionally, an estimated 200 million yen in broadcast revenue was lost from the two cancelled Yomiuri Giants games. Players received salary cuts totaling 190 million yen.

== Creation of a new team ==
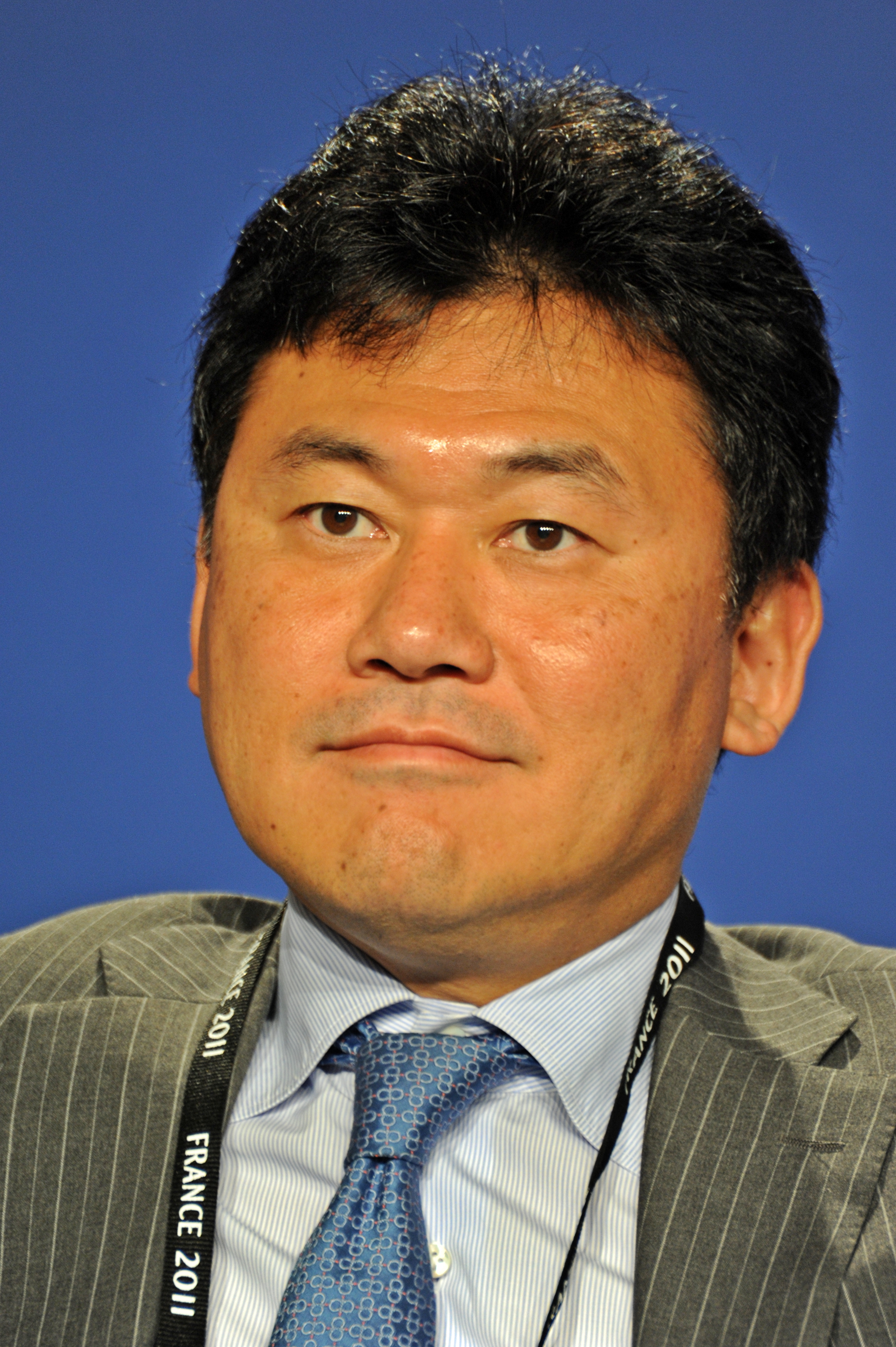
Rakuten President Hiroshi Mikitani applied for and won the opportunity to start a new baseball club in Sendai.

After Livedoor had unsuccessfully attempted to purchase the Buffaloes from Kintetsu earlier in the year, Livedoor President Takafumi Horie indicated that he intended to start a new professional baseball team that would fill the void left by the merger of the Orix BlueWave and the Buffaloes. On September 17, Livedoor established a new professional team and applied for team ownership with NPB. Horie said that the team would be composed of players who were left jobless after the Buffaloes/BlueWave merger and would be based in Sendai, Miyagi Prefecture. One week later a second Internet services company, Tokyo-based Rakuten, also submitted a formal application to Japanese professional baseball to form a team. Like Horie, Rakuten president Hiroshi Mikitani also expressed a desire to locate his new team in Sendai.

In early October, the public screening process to select one of the two companies and allow them form a new NPB team began. Both Livedoor and Rakuten were given an hour and a half to discuss their team and budget propositions before a panel of five Japanese baseball executives. The panel consisted of Central League chairman Hajime Toyokura and the head officials of the Yomiuri Giants, the Yokohama BayStars, the Seibu Lions and the Chiba Lotte Marines. The screening standards include the adequacy of the applications, the prospective continuity and stability of the planned baseball teams, the prospective financial standings of the applicants and planned teams, their planned baseball facilities, and what their plans were to bring Miyagi Stadium to NPB standards, and how fast said plans would take, as at the time, the stadium only sat 23,000. Rakuten's plans were to focus on said renovations offseason, and keep the capacity at 23,000 for the meantime, allocating 3.2 billion yen to do said renovations, with it to be completed before the 2006 season. Livedoor, meanwhile, claimed they only needed 2.5 billion yen and could finish it in the middle of the 2005 season.

Another public examination screening, this time targeting both companies' morals, was held on the 14th of October, where both companies, this time, were questioned on how they would prevent minors from accessing pornographic sites hosted on both companies' web hosting services. Livedoor's response, where they said they had no control over who can access their sites and who could not, eventually contributed to their downfall. Rakuten, meanwhile, stated they were able to do that.

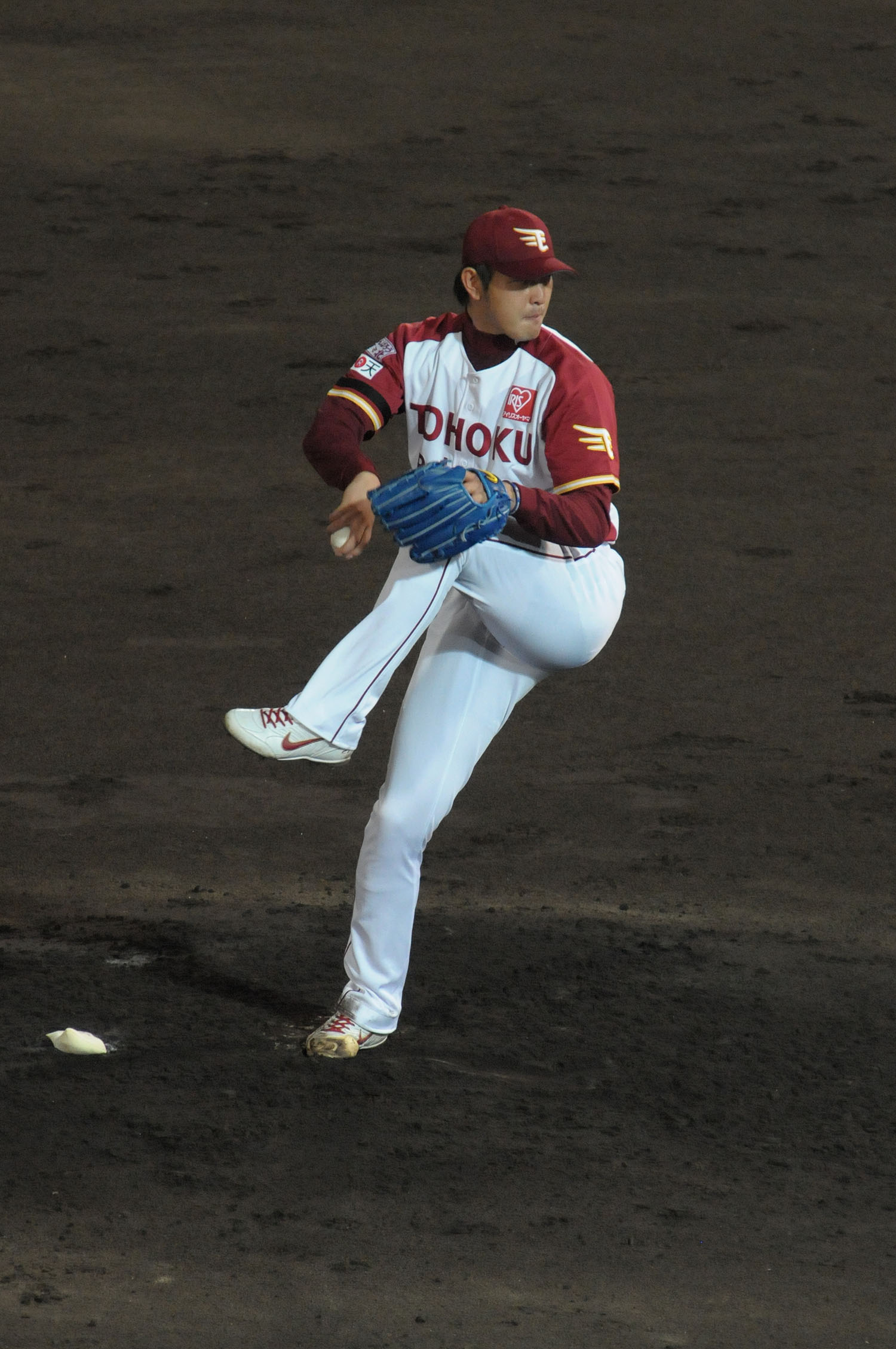
Pitcher Hisashi Iwakuma was one of 107 players distributed between the two new teams

As screenings were held weekly through October, more details about each potential new team emerged. Livedoor announced that their baseball club would be named the "Sendai Livedoor Phoenix", with former MLB and NPB player Tom O'Malley attached as manager and Katsunori Kojima as general manager. Rakuten, likewise, announced Marty Kuehnert and Yasushi Tao as general manager and manager, respectively, of their newly named "Tohoku Rakuten Golden Eagles" baseball club. Both clubs planned play out of Miyagi Stadium. Upon registering the trademark for their name, Rakuten learned that Livedoor had registered an "eagles" trademark one day earlier, as Horie, in retaliation of Rakuten winning the bid over his company, trademarked it to avoid them using it. This led to a legal battle that ended quickly, as Rakuten would end up just paying Horie to allow them to use the name.

A telephone survey conducted by Kyodo News during the selection period of 300 people living in the Tōhoku region indicated that Livedoor was the early fan favorite to win the right to start a new team in Sendai. In the survey, forty percent of the respondents supported Livedoor's bid compared to only seven percent supporting Rakuten. Rakuten, however, was considered the more likely of the two companies to be chosen by NPB. Rakuten president Mikitani had extensive connections in established Japanese business circles and already operated another sports team, the soccer club Vissel Kobe in Japan's J.League. On November 2, NPB selected Rakuten over Livedoor to create a new Pacific League team to be based in Sendai. It was the first time a new team, excluding cases of mergers or acquisitions, joined NPB since the creation of the now-defunct Takahashi Unions in the Pacific League in 1954. The choice of Rakuten over Livedoor was a smart one for NPB, as after Horie's arrest in 2006 over securities and accounting fraud, Livedoor also went down with it.

The Eagles and the newly merged Orix Buffaloes constructed their rosters from the 107 players left over from the dissolved Kintetsu and original Orix teams during a special distribution draft held on November 8. Before the draft, Orix was allowed to select 25 players that would be protected from the distribution process and thus giving them preferential signing rights. Included in this list were all free agents and foreign players. Rakuten was then allowed to select 20 unprotected players, not including any first- or second-year players. After that, the first- and second-year players were unprotected and Orix and Rakuten alternating selecting 20 more players for the last round of the draft. Any player that was not selected during the draft defaulted back to Orix, guaranteeing that all players would play the next season. Of the 40 players the Eagles selected, 17 were pitchers and 23 were position players. On Orix's list of protected players was Hisashi Iwakuma, the Kintetsu Buffaloes' pitcher who led the league in wins the previous season. Iwakuma, however, had wished to be left off of the list as he had no intention of playing for the newly formed team because of their involvement in the merger. He insisted that Orix team president Takashi Koizumi live up to his pledge that he would sincerely listen to the players involved in the merger regarding their futures. After four rounds of talks between Iwakuma and Koizumi, negotiations broke down and the JPBPA was brought in to mediate. Eventually, Orix agreed to trade Iwakuma to the Eagles in exchange for cash.

== Aftermath ==
Days after the players' strike, owners met on September 2 and approved a plan to hold interleague regular-season games during the 2005 season.

The Osaka Kintetsu Buffaloes ended their 55-year history when the team merged with the Orix BlueWave to form the Orix Buffaloes on December 1. The new team used both Kintetsu's former home stadium, the Osaka Dome, and Orix's, the Yahoo! BB Stadium in Kobe, as their home stadiums. It was the first team merger since the Daiei Unions were absorbed by the Mainichi Orions in November 1957.

The results of a nationwide telephone survey conducted by Kyodo News showed that 61.6 percent of respondents believed Japanese baseball would become more interesting with the addition the new Sendai-based Golden Eagles while 26.1 percent said they were unconvinced that the addition of the team would not increase fan interest.

It would take only 8 years for the Eagles to win a Japan Series championship after their founding in 2004, winning the 2013 Japan Series in 7 games over the Yomiuri Giants. On the flipside, it took the Buffaloes 18 years to win their first Japan Series since the merger, taking home the 2022 Japan Series in 7 games over the Tokyo Yakult Swallows.
