= Rakuten Mobile =

Japanese telecommunications company

Rakuten Mobile, Inc.

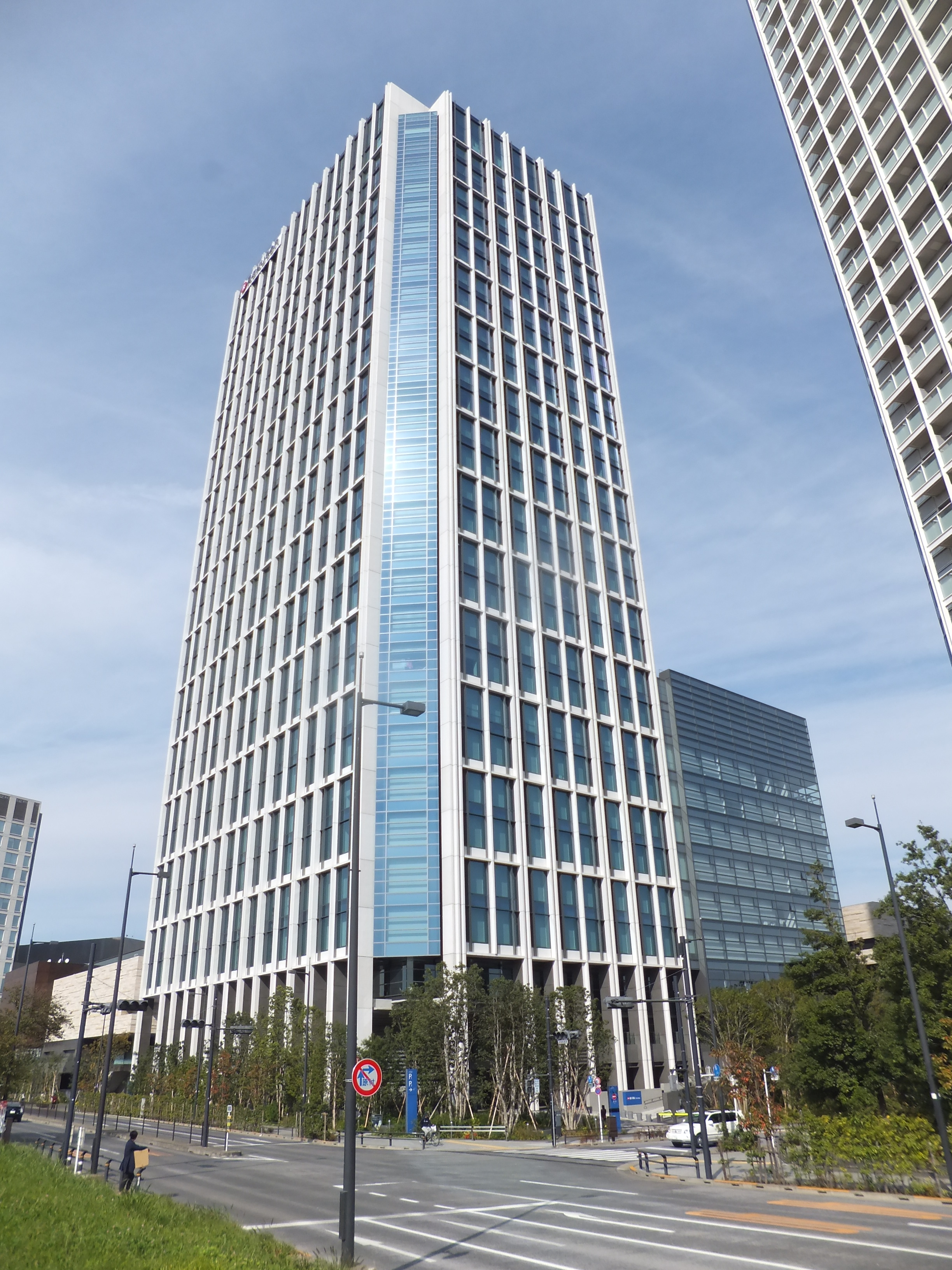
- Rakuten Crimson House, the headquarters of the company in Setagaya, Tokyo
- Type: Subsidiary
- Industry: Telecommunications
- Founded: 10 January 2018; 8 years ago
- Headquarters: Rakuten Crimson House, 1-14-1 Tamagawa, Setagaya-ku, Tokyo, Japan
- Area served: Japan
- Key people: Hiroshi Mikitani (chairman); Kazuhiro Matsui (CEO)
- Products: Mobile telephony; Internet services; Broadband
- Number of employees: Approximately 4,800 (2024)
- Parent: Rakuten Group, Inc.
- Subsidiaries: Rakuten Communications Corp.; Rakuten Symphony, Inc.; Rakuten Mobile Customer Service, Inc.; Rakuten Mobile Engineering, Inc.; Rakuten Mobile Infra Solution, Inc.
- Website: corp.mobile.rakuten.co.jp/english/

Rakuten Mobile, Inc. (commonly known as Rakuten Mobile) is a Japanese mobile network operator (MNO) headquartered in Setagaya, Tokyo. It is a wholly owned subsidiary of the Japanese technology conglomerate Rakuten Group. Rakuten Mobile operates nationwide 4G and 5G mobile telecommunications networks in Japan.

The company entered the Japanese mobile carrier market as the country's fourth major mobile network operator, competing with NTT Docomo, KDDI, and SoftBank Group. Rakuten Mobile is known for deploying a cloud-native mobile network architecture based on Open RAN technology.

Rakuten Mobile launched commercial 4G services in April 2020 and introduced 5G services later that year. The company has continued expanding network coverage across Japan while promoting a low-cost pricing model integrated with Rakuten's broader digital ecosystem.

== History ==
Rakuten Mobile was founded in January 2018 in Tokyo.

Rakuten Mobile and German telecommunications company 1&1 launched a mobile network based on Open RAN technology in December 2023.

== Services ==
=== LTE (4G) ===
Rakuten Mobile launched its cellular service in Japan (which was LTE) in April 2020 and with this, it became the 4th telecom operator in the country.

=== 5G ===
Rakuten mobile started rolling out its 5G service in October 2020 in selected regions of Japan.
