= Rakuten.com =

E-commerce website

Rakuten.com/shop
- Type: Subsidiary
- Industry: Internet
- Founded: September 12, 1997; 29 years ago
- Founder: Scott Blum
- Fate: Shutdown in 2020 by Rakuten
- Headquarters: San Mateo, California, U.S.
- Area served: Worldwide
- Key people: Hiroshi Mikitani
- Products: Retail
- Services: Online shopping
- Parent: Rakuten, Inc.
- Website: rakuten.com

Rakuten.com/shop was an e-commerce marketplace based in San Mateo, California. Previously known as Buy.com, it was founded in 1997 by Scott Blum. In 2010, it was purchased by Japanese company Rakuten, and rebranded as Rakuten.com. This business was shut down by Rakuten in 2020.

== History ==
=== Buy.com (1997–2010) ===
Buy.com originally sold only computers, at below cost, intending to bring in revenue through advertising and ancillary services such as sales of warranties and equipment leases, before expanding into numerous other categories, including software, books, videos and games. The company sold $125 million worth of goods and services in 1998, its first full year, beating Compaq's 1984 record for most first-year sales.

After raising $120 million from Japanese tech company SoftBank in 1998 and 1999, founder Scott Blum sold a portion of his stake to SoftBank in 1999 shortly before Buy.com's $195 million initial public offering in early 2000. On February 8, 2000, Buy.com went public at $13 per share and rose to $37.50 per share that day, its peak price. Mr. Blum still owned approximately 48% of the company at the time of the IPO. Stock values dropped in the year following Buy.com's initial public offering, and it was delisted from the NASDAQ Stock Market for failing to maintain a stock price above $1 per share. In February 2001, the UK arm of buy.com was sold to the UK department store John Lewis, and the technology was repurposed to create a new transactional website for the John Lewis chain. In November 2001, Blum reacquired Buy.com for $23.6 million (about 17 cents per share), and took the company private.

In 2002, Buy.com went beyond selling solely electronics, movies and music, adding more soft goods to their catalog, such as sports equipment, apparel, shoes, health and beauty products. It was at this time that Blum placed a full-page ad in The Wall Street Journal promising Amazon.com customers that Buy.com would prove to be the better buying option. This statement came shortly after Buy.com announced a 10% below Amazon.com cost on all books sold on the site and free shipping site-wide, with no minimum purchase required. At the time, Amazon had 25 million customers, approximately five times as many as Buy.com.

In March 2002, Buy.com announced its first issue of Buy.com Magazine, providing information about the latest electronic devices and computers, with four issues per year and a circulation of five million. The magazine was later converted into an all-digital publication.

On January 25, 2005, Buy.com filed to go public again, before withdrawing those plans in May 2007.

Buy.com officially launched a partnership with eBay in April 2008, striking a deal to sell millions of items on eBay. Buy.com would quickly become the largest seller on eBay. Many independent sellers were upset that, unlike other sellers, Buy.com was allowed to sell on eBay without paying listing fees.

From 2007 to 2009, the number of products for sale in Buy.com's marketplace grew from 2.3 million to 5 million, positioning it as the number two e-commerce site behind Amazon.com.

=== Rakuten purchase and rebranding (2010–2020) ===
In May 2010, Buy.com was acquired by Rakuten, Inc., the largest e-commerce retailer in Japan, for $250 million in cash. This was considered Rakuten's attempt to enter the American e-retail market, and to compete globally with e-commerce competitors such as Amazon.com and eBay. At the time, Rakuten in Japan had 64 million members, and Buy.com had 14 million customers, mostly located in the US and Europe. Half its products were sold directly to customers and half were sold through other e-commerce businesses using its online store.

On January 10, 2013, Rakuten announced the official rebranding of Buy.com to Rakuten.com Shopping, which became effective on January 31, 2013. On the site, rebranded as Rakuten.com, there were a series of unique virtual storefronts for shoppers to browse and connect online, with the focus on providing high quality, unique merchandise, and a shopper- and merchant-friendly experience. Each seller within Rakuten.com's marketplace could customize their page's layouts, photos and promotions, and can communicate with customers directly. With the rebranding, the site was populated entirely by individual merchants, whereas previous iterations of Buy.com had just a portion of the site devoted to independent sellers. Rakuten also launched e-commerce sites in Germany, Brazil, France, China, Thailand, Malaysia, Indonesia, Taiwan, South Korea, Austria, Russia, Canada and the United Kingdom.

On September 9, 2014, Rakuten announced the purchase of San Francisco–based online rebate site Ebates.com for $1 billion in cash. The acquisition of Ebates, a website that allows customers to earn cash back when shopping online with over 2,600 retailers, gave Rakuten.com additional presence in the US e-commerce market, as well as a way to offer items such as online e-coupons.

In March 2015, Rakuten.com partnered with Bitnet to accept bitcoin as payment.

On August 12, 2020, Rakuten.com sent an email to its customers stating that it would be closing its US operations as of September 15, 2020: "Rakuten's United States marketplace service located at Rakuten.com/shop will stop taking orders from September 15, 2020".

== Controversy ==
In May 2013, some users started complaining about alleged fraudulent charges on credit cards after using their cards on Rakuten.com. In some cases, it was alleged that the victims' names, social security numbers, dates of birth and credit card information were used to open accounts at other online vendors. In response, Rakuten.com issued a statement that the company had undertaken significant measures to validate the security of the site, and that a third-party technical forensics investigation found no wrongdoing on their end.
