= PopSugar =

American pop culture and wellness website

- Available in: English
- Founded: 2006; 20 years ago
- Headquarters: San Francisco, California, U.S.
- Owners: PopSugar Inc. (2006–2019); Group Nine Media, Inc. (2019–2022); Vox Media, Inc. (2022–2026); PMX Global, LLC (since 2026)
- Founders: Lisa Sugar; Brian Sugar
- Products: PopSugar, PopSugar Must Have, Beauty by POPSUGAR
- Parent: Vox Media, LLC (2022–2026); VM Publishing, LLC (since 2026)
- Website: popsugar.com
- Launched: March 2006; 20 years ago

PopSugar is an online American pop culture and wellness publication, founded in 2006 by married couple Brian and Lisa Sugar. The company is part of American digital holding company VM Publishing, LLC, a subsidiary of PMX Global, LLC, unit of Penske Media Corporation.

PopSugar features lifestyle content targeted towards women 18–34, across topics such as beauty, entertainment, fashion, fitness, food, and parenting, on mobile, video, and social media.

== History ==
Husband and wife Brian Sugar and Lisa Sugar founded Sugar Publishing Incorporated, in 2006, after a suggestion by blogger Om Malik that Lisa turn her celebrity gossip hobby into a company. Brian became CEO and Lisa Editor-in-Chief, and they added venture capitalist Michael Moritz to the board.

In 2007, the company announced a name change to Sugar Inc. along with the acquisition of ShopStyle, a fashion shopping search engine, followed by acquisitions of Starbrand Media, FreshGuide, and Circle of Moms in 2012. In 2013, the company officially changed its name from Sugar Inc. to PopSugar Inc., and announced that it was profitable and had grown to over 450 employees.

POPSUGAR logo used from 2015 to 2024

In 2019, American digital holding company Group Nine Media acquired PopSugar in an all-stock transaction. In June 2024, Popsugar underwent a significant rebrand by owner Vox Media, renaming the namesake publication to PS with a greater focus on women's health, fitness, and wellness. In June 2026, Penske Media Corporation, then the largest shareholder of Vox Media, acquired several brands from the company, including Popsugar.

== Operations ==
Headquartered in San Francisco, PopSugar Inc., was funded by Sequoia Capital and Institutional Venture Partners. The company also has offices in Chicago, London, Los Angeles, and New York.

PopSugar previously operated the PopSugar Must Have subscription, which was service that sent subscribers a monthly box of items curated by PopSugar editors. It also offered special edition boxes with retailers such as CFDA, Neiman Marcus, and Target. The final PopSugar Must Have box was released in Summer 2020.
