= Ave!Comics =

French digital comics company

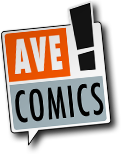
- All your comics in your pocket!
- Founded: 2008
- Headquarters: Montpellier, France
- Products: Comics
- Parent: Aquafadas

Ave!Comics Production is a privately owned French company editing comics on smartphones, tablets and computers. It was founded in 2008 and it is a subsidiary of Aquafadas, a software development company in digital publishing owned by Kobo Inc. AveComics is a comic book store for digital comic books that can be used on computers, tablets, and smartphones.(iOS, Android) Readers can buy and read comic books, manga and graphic novels in French, English and Spanish. AveComics uses a technology created by Aquafadas for comics transformation, distribution and reading, based around its AVE format.

The AveComics application was also a finalist in the BlackBerry Innovation Awards 2009, in the "Entertainment" category.

== Company history ==
Aquafadas, a company working on creative software for Flash, HTML5, photo, and video editing, created the application MyComics to allow the reading of comics on mobile in 2006.

This application was made available in 2008, to enable the reading and storing of comics on iPhone and iPod Touch. A reading system adapted to low resolution screens was also available. In October of the same year, the company launched a comics library on both devices, in partnership with the Angoulême International Comics Festival, Fnac and SNCF. This library included the official selection of the festival, and was downloaded over 150 000 times.

In December 2008 "The Adventures of Lucky Luke n°3", at Lucky Comics was published on both devices. The comic made a 50 000 € turnover. In April 2009, "Les Blondes" 10th volume was the top-selling comic for 10 months on the AppStore.

After, in August 2009, the AveComics application was launched on iPhone, iPod Touch and BlackBerry. The company's website was launched in September when more than 100 titles were available on smartphones and computers.

== Catalogue ==
AveComics works with over 80 international publishers including Glénat, Marsu Productions, Delcourt, Casterman, Soleil, Ubisoft, Les Humanoïdes Associés and Mad Fabrik. Comics such as "Assassin's Creed", "Talisman", "Titeuf", and "Seoul District" are sold by the company.

== Award ==
- Grand Prix Software Venture Capital - Senate 2008.
