= EverWing =

2016 video game

- Developer: Game Closure
- Publisher: Game Closure
- Platforms: Instant Games on Messenger and Facebook News Feed
- Release: November 29, 2016
- Genre: Action
- Modes: Single-player, Multiplayer

EverWing is a game created by Game Closure (formerly Blackstorm Labs) and released on the Instant Games platform in Facebook Messenger in November 2016.

== Gameplay ==
EverWing is a vertical scrolling shooter game in which Guardians and their dragon Sidekicks fight against hordes of Monsters and Bosses in order to reclaim their kingdom.

=== Game modes ===
==== Single Player ====
Single Player is the core EverWing game mode in which players control Guardians in their endless fight to defeat monsters and bosses.

==== Boss Raids ====
Boss Raids is a cooperative multiplayer mode which allows players to team up with their friends to defeat super monsters. Boss Raids launched as part of an in-game event, The Reckoning, on March 1, 2017.

==== Quests ====
Quests allow users to send their Guardian Sophia on missions, and come back later to claim treasure collected by the Guardian.

==== Guardians ====
Name	Title	Description	Level Unlocked	Coins Requirement	Class	Ability
Alice	Guardian of Courage	She never backs down from a challenge and is always first to the front lines of battle.	-	0	Common	Leader's Luck
Fiona	Guardian of Dragons	She was born in the wilds and raised by dragons. When dragons fly with her, they earn 2x XP!	2	1,000	Common	Dragon Trainer
Sophia	Guardian of Adventure	Renowned, explorer, inventor and scientist, she is 2x faster completing Quests	3	12,000	Common	Egg Hunter
Lily	Guardian of Fortune	A master Alchemist and Mage of the Third Order, she earns 2x Coins. Cha-ching!	6	30,0000	Common	Golden Touch
Aurora	Guardian of Nature	Caretaker of the forest, a true sister to Nature. Her enchanted magnet attracts items!	19	150,0000	Rare	Magnetism
Lenore	Guardian of Twilight	A mysterious loner, with a dark and haunting past, some say she acts as if she has 2 lives...	25	150,0000	Rare	Ghostform
Jade	Guardian of Shadows	An assassin who fears nothing, she can become invulnerable and double damage after charging up.	30	From challenges	Epic	Shadowform
Arcana	Guardian of Magic	This sly illusionist has a few tricks up her sleeve. She can clone sidekicks and harness their powers for unique spell combos after charging up.	35	From boss raids and challenges	Epic	Dragonspell
Lyra	Guardian of Might	Five-star General, formerly of the Royal EverWing Airforce, she now commands the five elements within her plasma cannons.	35	From boss raids and challenges	Epic	Prisma Cannons
Trixie	Guardian of Mischief	A spunky warrior with a love of sweets, Trixie collects candy to rush through enemy waves and gain massive boosts in Raids.	35	From boss raids and challenges	Rare	Candy Rush
Lucia	Guardian of Frost	Imbued with the power of winter, Lucia pierces enemies with frozen daggers and freezes them mid-flight.	35	From boss raids and challenges	Rare	Freezing Blast
Neve	Guardian of Rage	A vengeful berserker! Attacks charge her bouncing axe, which deals 15x Nature DMG per second! Catch it to refill 50% charge.	35	From boss raids and challenges	Rare	Runic Fang

==== Sidekicks ====
Sidekicks are dragons that can be bought as eggs, through either coins or gems, in the dragon roost, or obtained by challenging friends to play Everwing.

Dragons are one of five rarities: Common, Rare, Epic, Legendary and Mythic. Common dragons have no special powers, but have high attack damage. Rare dragons have special powers, and medium attack damage. Legendary dragons usually have better special powers, and medium to high attack damage.

Dragons have a different number of stars depending on how evolved they are. A one-star dragon can only level up to level 10. It must be evolved to level up further and become a 2-star dragon. A 2-star dragon can only level up to level 20 before it must evolve up to 3 stars. A level 30, 3-star dragon is the highest level a dragon can reach. Two dragons at level 30 can be combined to limit break, exceeding the maximum level of 30.

In order to evolve a dragon, the player needs two of the same dragons at their maximum level. If they have the same zodiac sign, the dragon will receive bonus damage of 25% and 30% for each tier.

Dragons can be sold (permanently) for Dragonfruit. Dragons that are at level 10, 20 or 30 sell for Dragonfruit, whereas at any other level, it is also for Dragonfruit.

===== Dragon Eggs =====
Name	Cost	Chance of a Common Dragon	Chance of a Rare Dragon	Chance of an Epic Dragon	Chance of a Legendary Dragon	Chance of a Mythic Dragon
Common	640 Coins	100%	0%	0%	0%	0%
Bronze	3,200 Coins	84%	13%	2%	1%	0%
Silver	16,000 Coins	0%	82%	12%	6%	0%
Gold	32,000 Coins	0%	70%	18%	11%	1%
Magical	200 Gems	0%	53%	25%	18%	4%
Ancient	700 Gems	0%	0%	0%	86%	14%

== Gamebot ==
EverWing features a gamebot which notifies users about the status of leaderboard competitions, as well as their various Boss Raids and Quests. Players can also interact with the gamebot to manage their Quests directly from the chat thread, claiming treasures, and redeploying their Guardians again on another Quest.

== Awards ==
EverWing was named the Facebook Game of the Year in 2016.
