= Altiostar =

American vRAN provider

- Company type: Subsidiary
- Industry: Wireless Software
- Founded: 2011
- Founder: Ashraf Dahod
- Owner: Rakuten
- Website: www.altiostar.com

Altiostar is a company that provides open virtual radio access network (vRAN) technology. The company is headquartered just outside of Boston, Massachusetts, with offices in Japan, Italy, the U.K., Mexico and India. The company is a subsidiary of Rakuten. Founded in 2011 by President and CEO, Ashraf Dahod, Altiostar is focused on open, virtual RAN software that they claim can integrate operation of equipment from multiple vendors.

== History ==
Altiostar was started by the founders of Starent Networks, a startup bought by Cisco in 2009. Altiostar came out of stealth mode in late 2014 after raising $70 million in funding starting in 2012. The company's initial offering was a virtualized Cloud-RAN (C-RAN) solution that connected radios with controllers with Ethernet, instead of dark fiber. In 2015, the company introduced a virtual radio access network (vRAN) product. In 2017, Altiostar released an Open vRAN Development Platform, allowing independent radio equipment manufacturers to develop a vRAN solution utilizing Altiostar technology. Since its debut, the company has raised $357.5 million from Cisco, Rakuten Mobile, Qualcomm Ventures, Telefonica and Tech Mahindra among others.

== Rakuten ==
In 2019, Rakuten Mobile invested in Altiostar. In 2020, Rakuten commercially launched its 4G network in Japan, using Altiostar as a software contributor for its 4G RAN, with plans to also use the software for its 5G network. In August 2021, Rakuten acquired Altiostar.

== Partners ==
Altiostar has collaborated with a wide variety of partners to enable 4G and 5G network transformation through its open vRAN solution, including:

- 2011 – Cisco
- 2015 – Texas Instruments, Qwilt and Wind River
- 2016 – TIM
- 2017 – Corning and Dali Wireless and SK Telecom
- 2018 – Amdocs, Deutsche Telekom, GCI, Sercomm, Telefónica and Vodafone
- 2019 – Qualcomm, Rakuten, Telecom Infra Project (TIP) and Ubicquia
- 2020 – Airspan, Bharti Airtel, NEC Corporation (NEC) and World Wide Technology

== Awards ==
- 2015 – Fierce Innovation Awards (Telecom Edition) - Next-Gen Deployment for NFV C-RAN Solution
- 2016 – GLOTEL Global Telecoms Awards “Highly Recommended” for Innovative Use of Spectrum
- 2017 – GSMA GLOMO Award - Best Mobile Technology Breakthrough and Outstanding Overall Mobile Technology – The CTO's choice for vRAN Solution
- 2019 – GSMA 100
- 2019 – Intel Network Builders Winners’ Circle 2019-2020 Leaders Board
