= ShopStyle =

Digital shopping platform

ShopStyle was a digital shopping platform owned by Rakuten Rewards. Launched in 2007 as a Web search engine for fashion, it was thereafter transformed into a fashion marketplace and inspiration engine. ShopStyle listed over 14 million products across apparel, accessories, beauty, home furnishings and kids' items. It drove $1 billion in gross sales to its global network of 1,400 retailers. ShopStyle was also the commerce engine behind Collective Voice, a creator marketing company with over 14,000 bloggers, vloggers and social media users, who used ShopStyle’s platform to earn money from the sales they drive to retailers.

== History ==
ShopStyle was thought-up by San Francisco-based UK expat Andy Moss in 2006 while he was running local e-commerce website Cairo and noticed that shoes were among the most popular items searched for there. The technology behind ShopStyle was created by a group of engineers Moss had met while working at Ariba (now SAP Ariba), including Trey Matteson, Garrick Toubassi and Mike Lenz. The US website launched in February 2007 with a focus on aesthetics and user experience in an attempt to recreate a magazine-like experience digitally. It was variously described as an online equivalent of a shopping mall or a shoppable digital magazine.

In September 2007 PopSugar Inc. (then Sugar Publishing) purchased ShopStyle for an undisclosed sum. After the acquisition, ShopStyle focused its efforts on broadening out the product count, retailer expansion and becoming a search engine for fashion By the end of 2015 ShopStyle’s global sites generated five million searches per week and listed 12 million products from 1,400 retailers.

In 2017, ShopStyle was bought by Ebates, known now as Rakuten Rewards.

In December 2025, it was announced that ShopStyle and the Collective Voice platform would be shut down in July 2026.
