= Japan Professional Baseball Players Association =

Trade union in Japan

JPBPA
- Japan Professional Baseball Players Association
- 日本プロ野球選手会
- Founded: August 15, 1980
- Location: Japan
- Members: 741
- Key people: Ginjiro Sumitani (Union Chairman); Yohei Oshima (Institute Chairman)
- Website: http://jpbpa.net/

The Japan Professional Baseball Players Association (日本プロ野球選手会, Nihon Puro Yakyū Senshu Kai; JPBPA) is the players' union that represents Japanese baseball players and their interests in Nippon Professional Baseball. The organization was incorporated in 1980 and was approved as a labor union in 1985. The current union chairman is Ginjiro Sumitani and the current institute chairman is Yohei Oshima.

The JPBPA orchestrated the two-day players' strike during the 2004 NPB realignment.

== See also ==
- Major League Baseball Players Association
