= Game Closure =

Technology company

Game Closure is a Silicon Valley–based technology company which builds post-app store technology.

== History ==
The company was founded in Silicon Valley in 2011 by American technology entrepreneur, Michael Carter, and his partner, Tom Fairfield. It has since raised $33.5m in venture capital funding. In 2014, Carter co-founded the startup "Hello World"—and sold it in less than three months to Life360 for over $1 million.

== Company details and products ==
Game Closure is a partner with Rakuten in a joint venture called Rakuten Games, the Tokyo-based content creator that built the RGames HTML5 gaming platform. Carter also sits on the Board of Directors of Rakuten Games.

Game Closure is responsible for creating the game EverWing on Facebook's Instant Games platform, which was named a 2016 Facebook Game of the Year.
