= Atolls (company) =

Privately held international commerce content and affiliate marketing company

- Type: Private
- Industry: Online marketing
- Founded: 2012
- Founders: Andreas Fruth; Adrian Renner; Gerhard Trautmann
- Area served: Worldwide
- Services: Online services
- Revenue: ▲€ 165 million (2022)
- Number of employees: ~1 000 (2024)
- Website: atolls.com

Atolls, formerly known as Global Savings Group (GSG), is a privately held international commerce content online savings, cashback, and affiliate marketing company, that combines multiple savings portals in over 20 countries. The company owns CupoNation, Pepper.com and Coupons.com, as well as several other discount code and deal sites across Europe, and operates coupon portals for publishing houses. GSG has won the German Deloitte’s Technology Fast 50 award and was included in Deloitte’s Technology Fast 500 EMEA list in 2017. In 2016, the company generated $546 million in sales for retailers. The company is headquartered in Munich, Germany.

== History ==
Atolls was founded in 2012 as CupoNation by Andreas Fruth, Adrian Renner, and Gerhard Trautmann together with Rocket Internet. They had also previously collaborated on Dropgifts GmbH, a site that allowed users to engage in social and mobile gifting. In 2016 the company changed its name from CupoNation to Global Savings Group. In 2019, the company acquired the UK-based money-saving browser extension provider Pouch for a cash purchase in the 7-figure US dollar range. In 2020, the company made a significant acquisition by purchasing iGraal, a leading French cashback company, for €123.5 million. The company continued its expansion in 2021 with the acquisition of Shoop, a prominent cashback platform based in Berlin. The exact amount of this acquisition remains undisclosed. GSG acquired US based consumer savings brand and domain Coupons.com in October 2022. In December 2022, Global Savings Group merged with Pepper.com and its network of savings portals.

== Rebranding to Atolls ==
On September 11, 2024, the decision to rebrand to Atolls was announced.

== Business model and operations ==
Atolls operates multiple shopping websites, including coupon platforms such as Coupons.com and Cuponation, cashback platforms iGraal and Shoop, and online shopping communities including Hotukdeals, mydealz, and Dealabs.

== Company structure ==
Atolls GmbH, based in Munich, Germany, serves as the parent company within the Group. Listed below are the main subsidiaries and the associated internet portals or services.

Name of the company	Registered office	Portals / services
Atolls Brasil Ltda.	São Paulo, Brazil	Cuponation.com.br
Atolls Enterprises Canada Ltd.	Vancouver, Canada	
Atolls Germany GmbH	Munich, Germany	mydealz.de, Preisjäger.at, Pepper.com, Pepper.pl, Pepperdeals.se, Shoop.de, Cuponation.ch, Cuponation.at
Atolls GmbH	Munich, Germany	Parent company
Atolls India eServices Private Limited	Bangalore, India	
Atolls London Limited	London, United Kingdom	
Atolls Madrid S.L.	Madrid, Spain	Cuponation.com.mx, Cuponation.es
Atolls Malaysia SDN BHD	Kuala Lumpur, Malaysia	Cuponation.com.au, Cuponation.co.id, Cuponation.com.my, Cuponation.co.nz, Cuponation.sg
Atolls North America LLC	Atlanta, United States	Coupons.com, Pepperdeals.com
Atolls Poland Sp. z o.o.	Warsaw, Poland	
Digital Link Marketing S.L.	Seville, Spain	Chollometro.com
iGraal SAS	Paris, France	iGraal FR, iGraal DE, iGraal ES, iGraal PL, Radins.com
Imbull B.V.	Amsterdam, Netherlands	Cuponation.dk, Cuponation.fi, Cuponation.no, Cuponation.se, Kortingscode.nl
Jalapeno Media Ltd.	Vancouver, Canada	Promodescuentos.com
Pepper Deals Ltd.	London, United Kingdom	Hotukdeals.com
Pepper France SAS	Paris, France	Dealabs.com
