= Quotient Technology =

Internet coupon and loyalty business

Quotient Technology, Inc.
- Company type: Public
- Traded as: NYSE: QUOT
- Industry: Advertising Technology
- Founded: May 1998; 28 years ago
- Founder: Steven Boal
- Headquarters: Salt Lake City, Utah, U.S.
- Key people: Matt Krepsik (CEO)
- Revenue: ▼US$ 288.8 million (2022)
- Operating income: ▼US$ -71.38 million (2022)
- Net income: ▼US$ -76.5 million (2022)
- Total assets: ▼US$ 363.16 million (2022)
- Total equity: ▼US$ 177.8 million (2022)
- Owner: Neptune Retail Solutions (2023–present)
- Number of employees: 1000+ (2023)
- Website: www.quotient.com

Quotient Technology, Inc. (formerly Coupons.com) was an advertising technology company headquartered in Salt Lake City, Utah. It specialized in digital promotions, retail media, digital out-of-home (DOOH) advertising, social influencer marketing, display advertising and data and analytics. In 2023, Atolls completed the acquisition of Coupons.com from Quotient, and on September 5, 2023, Quotient was acquired by Neptune Retail Solutions.

== History ==
Quotient Technology, formerly Coupons.com, Inc., was founded in 1998 by Steven Boal, former CEO. Coupons.com originally was a website for finding and printing coupons. The website eventually expanded to the Coupons.com app, which enabled consumers to redeem cashback offers and load offers to loyalty cards, as well as find printable coupons. In June 2011, Coupons.com’s value was estimated at $1 billion. In October 2011, Greylock Partners announced an investment of up to $30 million in a secondary market purchase of company shares. In 2014, Coupons.com went public with a $100 million IPO with NYSE trading under COUP. In 2015, Coupons.com changed its corporate name to Quotient Technology, Inc. (NYSE: QUOT). The Coupons.com domain is now owned by Atolls (formerly Global Savings Group).

== Acquisitions ==
Quotient Technology has acquired 10 organizations in total: Ubimo, Elevaate, Ahalogy, Crisp Mobile, Shopmium, Eckin, Yub, KitchMe, Couponstar and Grocery iQ. Ubimo was acquired in 2019.
