= Voyagin =

Travel activities marketplace based in Japan

- Company type: Subsidiary
- Industry: Travel
- Founded: 2011; 14 years ago
- Founder: Masashi Takahashi, Tushar Khandelwal, Hiroyuki Hayashi
- Defunct: 2020
- Fate: Acquired and merged
- Successor: Rakuten Travel Experiences
- Headquarters: Tokyo, Japan
- Area served: Worldwide
- Services: Online travel agency
- Owner: Rakuten
- Website: govoyagin.com

Voyagin was a Japanese tour and activity online booking platform headquartered in Tokyo. The company was founded in 2011 as FindJPN, rebranded as Voyagin in 2012 by its founders, then rebranded again by Rakuten. The company was acquired in 2015 and merged and rebranded as Rakuten Travel Experiences in 2020.

In July 2015, Rakuten announced it acquired a majority stake in Voyagin to expand its travel market in Asia. Rakuten absorbed Voyagin on 1 July 2020, while retaining the Voyagin name and website. In December 2021, the company changed its name to Rakuten Travel Experiences and relaunched with a new website.

== History ==
The company was founded in January 2011 originally under the name of FindJPN by Masashi Takahashi and Hiroyuki Hayashi. Tushar Khandelwal came on board in 2012 and they relaunched the brand as Voyagin, a more global approach to booking tours and activities. It started as part of Open Network Lab, a Japanese incubator, and then raised seed funding from Digital Garage and other investors in 2012.

They then raised a second round of funding of $500,000 in 2014, led by Singapore National Research Foundation and Jungle Ventures.

On 2 July 2015, Rakuten announced their majority-stake acquisition of Voyagin after 6 months of talks, for an undisclosed figure, with the aim to expand their market share of the Asia travel industry.

On 20 April 2020, Rakuten announced the decision to merge Voyagin into Rakuten. The absorption-type merger was completed on 1 July 2020.

On 23 December 2021, the company changed its name to Rakuten Travel Experiences and launched a new website at https://experiences.travel.rakuten.com/.

== Business ==
Voyagin was a travel activities marketplace that enabled travelers and locals to book tickets and tours in Asia and parts of Europe and the US. As Rakuten Travel Experiences, the service has extended to cover destinations in North and South America as well as Oceania.
