= Rakuten DX =

French software company

- Formerly: Rakuten Aquafadas
- Company type: Subsidiary
- Industry: Computer software; Digital publishing
- Founded: 2006; 20 years ago
- Founder: Claudia Zimmer; Matthieu Kopp
- Headquarters: Montpellier, France
- Area served: Worldwide
- Key people: Yasufumi Hirai (chairman); Olivier Alluis (CEO); Florian Lemoine (CTO)
- Owner: Rakuten Group
- Number of employees: ~60+
- Website: dx.rakuten.com

Rakuten DX was a French software company specializing in no-code development platforms for building mobile applications and digital publishing solutions. Headquartered in Montpellier, France, the company develops tools used by enterprises and digital publishers to create and manage mobile and web applications.

The company was originally founded in 2006 and later became part of Rakuten Group. It was previously known as Rakuten Aquafadas before being rebranded as Rakuten DX.

== Sector ==
Rakuten DX provides mobile application tools & digital experience services for enterprises designed to support businesses in their digital transformation.

== Company history ==
=== Headquarters ===
Rakuten DX headquarters are in Montpellier, France, and also has offices in Paris.

=== Key dates ===
- 2004: Creation of the first software, iDive
- 2006: Aquafadas founded as a company by Claudia Zimmer and Matthieu Kopp. PulpMotion, the second software, launches.
- 2007: BannerZest – software designed to create Flash banners – enters the market. The same year Ave!Comics, book store for digital comic books owned by Aquafadas, starts to gain attention in the comic books world.
- 2008: VideoPier launch
- December 2008, the latest Lucky Luke comic book on iPhone goes on sale thanks to the Ave!Comics3 tools
- 2009: SnapFlow launch
- May 2009, creation of Ave!Comics3 Production
- 2010: BannerZest for Windows goes live. BannerZest Fun Pics Facebook app launches. Plug-in PulpFx created in partnership with Noise Industries goes live. Digital publications for Fnac and Orange enter the market. Launch of mobile apps for: RMC Sport, La Tribune and Reader's Digest.
- 2011: Partnership with Quark to make Aquafadas technology compatible with Quark 9 et Quark QPS. Adobe InDesign 4 Plugin designed for digital publishing goes live. New clients using Aquafadas tools for their digital publications: La Réunion des Musées Nationaux – Grand Palais, Reader's Digest, La Tribune, Bayard, and Carlsen.
- 2012: The Canadian e-reading company Kobo Inc. acquires Aquafadas.
- 2017: Aquafadas becomes a major subsidiary of the Rakuten Group, appointing Yasufumi Hirai as Chairman and Koichiro Takahara as CEO.
- July 2017: Aquafadas becomes Rakuten Aquafadas as a part of corporate rebranding and integration within the Rakuten Group
- November 23, 2020: Rakuten Aquafadas becomes Rakuten DX.
- 2023: Rakuten DX shut down due to company reorganization and restructure
