= Rakuten TV =

Video-on-demand and free ad-supported streaming television platform

- Logo used since 2010
- Type: Subsidiary
- Industry: Electronic commerce
- Founded: 2010
- Founders: Cédric Dufour
- Headquarters: Tokyo and Barcelona, Japan and Spain
- Area served: Asia: Japan; Europe: Åland Islands, Albania, Austria, Belgium, Bosnia and Herzegovina, Bulgaria, Croatia, Cyprus, Czech Republic, Denmark, Estonia, Faroe Islands, Finland, France, Germany, Greece, Greenland, Hungary, Iceland, Ireland, Italy, Latvia, Lithuania, Luxembourg, North Macedonia, Malta, Montenegro, Netherlands, Norway, Poland, Portugal, Romania, Serbia, Slovakia, Slovenia, Spain, Sweden, Switzerland, United Kingdom, and Ukraine
- Products: Video on demand films and TV series, TV channels
- Number of employees: 200
- Parent: Rakuten
- Website: www.rakuten.tv (Europe) tv.rakuten.co.jp(Japan)

Rakuten TV is a video-on-demand (VOD) service owned by the Japanese technology conglomerate Rakuten. In Europe, the service is operated by Rakuten TV Europe, headquartered in Barcelona, Spain, while in Japan, it is operated directly by Rakuten as a separate service.

Rakuten TV is a video-on-demand (VOD) and free ad-supported streaming television (FAST) platform, providing movies and TV series for subscription, rental, and purchase as well as FAST channels with a mix of local and global content. Since 2019, the platform has provided users access to different content via TVOD, AVOD, SVOD, and FAST.

Rakuten TV's VOD catalogue includes content from studios around the world, including Warner Bros., Disney, and Sony Pictures, local distributors, and independent labels producing both locally and globally oriented content. Similarly, Rakuten TV's distribution of FAST channels includes both its own Rakuten curated channels as well as FAST channels and TV channels operated and curated by its partners around the world. Rakuten TV's content can be streamed from most devices, offering a similar service to Netflix and other streaming services.

The company is headquartered in Tokyo and Barcelona and currently operates in Japan as well as several countries around Europe; Aaland Islands, Albania, Austria, Belgium, Bosnia and Herzegovina, Bulgaria, Croatia, Cyprus, Czech Republic, Denmark, Estonia, Faroe Islands, Finland, France, Germany, Greece, Greenland, Hungary, Iceland, Ireland, Italy, Latvia, Lithuania, Luxembourg, North Macedonia, Malta, Montenegro, Netherlands, Norway, Poland, Portugal, Romania, Serbia, Slovakia, Slovenia, Spain, Sweden, Switzerland, United Kingdom, and Ukraine.

In Japan, the video streaming service Rakuten SHOWTIME changed its name to Rakuten TV on 1 July 2017 and has been operating under the new name since then.

Rakuten also operates another global video-on-demand (VOD) streaming service called Rakuten Viki which is headquartered in San Mateo, California with additional offices in Tokyo, Japan, Seoul, South Korea, and Singapore. Rakuten Viki focuses on distributing content from parts of Asia to the rest of the world. This includes drama, variety shows, and animation from Japan, Korea, mainland China, Taiwan, and Thailand.

== History ==
In 2010, the service was launched in Spain under the name Wuaki.tv, and later expanded to Andorra. By 2013, it had entered the markets in Britain, as well as Italy, France, and Germany later that same year.

In June 2012, e-commerce company Rakuten acquired the company, previously known as Wuaki.tv. In July 2017, Wuaki.tv changed its name to Rakuten TV. Rakuten took over the user base from TalkTalk TV Store (previously Blinkbox) including migration of user purchased titles, in June 2018.

On 12 October 2026, the service announced that it will be launching in the U.S. by the end of 2026.

== Rakuten Sports ==
On 11 June 2019, Rakuten announced the launch of Rakuten Sports, a new live streaming and video on demand (VOD) sports entertainment platform to expand and deliver sports content to several countries around the world, after eleven countries across Europe.

From November 2019, Rakuten Sports provided the subscription streaming coverage of Davis Cup for two seasons 2019 and 2020, also as the part of main sponsorship, starting from the 2019 finals.
