= Hiroshi Mikitani =

Japanese billionaire business magnate and writer (born 1965)

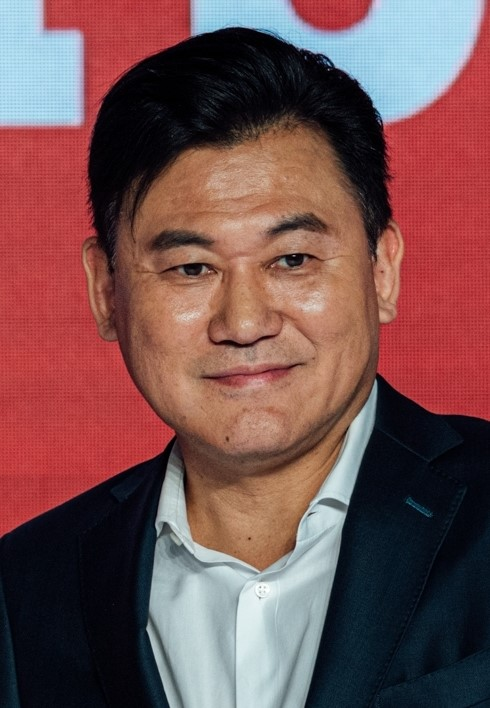
- Mikitani in 2020
- Born: March 11, 1965 (age 61); Kobe, Hyogo, Japan
- Education: Hitotsubashi University; Harvard Business School
- Occupations: Founder & CEO, Rakuten, Inc. (1997–present)
- Years active: 1988–present
- Spouse: Haruko Mikitani (m. 1993)
- Children: 2
- Website: Hiroshi Mikitani Twitter account Hiroshi Mikitani English Twitter account

Hiroshi Mikitani (三木谷浩史, Mikitani Hiroshi; born March 11, 1965) is a Japanese billionaire business magnate and writer. He is the founder and CEO of Rakuten, Inc. He is also the president of Crimson Group, chairman of the football club Vissel Kobe, chairman of Tokyo Philharmonic Orchestra, and a board member of Lyft and The Thacher School.

== Early life and education ==
Mikitani was born in 1965 and raised in Kobe, Hyōgo Prefecture, Japan. His father Ryōichi Mikitani served as Chairman of Japan Society Of Monetary Economics and was a professor at Kobe University. His mother Setsuko was a graduate of Kobe University and worked for a trading company; she had attended elementary school in New York. Through his paternal grandmother, he claims descent from Honda Tadakatsu, one of the Four Heavenly Kings of shogun Tokugawa Ieyasu. His grandmother was born to a noble family which had fallen on hard times, and raised Mikitani's father as a single mother while running a tobacco store. His grandfather was a businessman active in New York, and was a co-founder of Minolta. Ryōichi was Japan's first Fulbright Scholar to the US and taught for two years at Yale University; during that time, from 1972 to 1974, the family lived in New Haven, Connecticut. His sister Ikuko is a physician (MD in Osaka University), and his brother Kenichi is a professor of biology at the University of Tokyo.

Mikitani attended Hitotsubashi University, graduating in 1988 with a degree in commerce.

== Career ==
=== Banking ===
Mikitani worked at the Industrial Bank of Japan (now part of Mizuho Corporate Bank) from 1988 to 1996, with a break from 1991 to 1993 to attend Harvard Business School. He left to start his own consulting group, called Crimson Group. Mikitani has stated that the destruction caused by the devastating 1995 Kobe earthquake made him realize he wanted to help revitalize Japan's economy, leading to his resignation from banking and decision to start his own business.

=== Rakuten ===
In 1996, Mikitani began venturing into the high technology business and started looking at various business models, and decided to launch an online shopping mall. On February 7, 1997, Mikitani founded the e-commerce company MDM, Inc. with three co-founders and US$250,000 of their own money, launching the online marketplace Rakuten Ichiba in Japan on May 1, 1997. The company was renamed Rakuten, Inc. in 1999, and Mikitani took it public on the JASDAQ in 2000. In founding the company, Mikitani envisioned an online marketplace focusing on the exchange between buyers and sellers, as a hybrid between eBay and Amazon.com. It started as a small online marketplace with 13 shops and 6 employees, and has since grown into "an e-commerce giant".

In 2010, Mikitani changed Rakuten's focus, as the company began expanding outside Japan, with acquisitions of overseas e-commerce sites including Buy.com of the US (now Rakuten.com), PriceMinister of France, and continuing with companies including Canadian e-book service Kobo (now Rakuten Kobo), US cashback site Ebates (now Rakuten Rewards), and Cyprus-based messaging app Viber (now Rakuten Viber), and minority stakes in online scrapbooking site Pinterest and ride-hailing app Lyft (where Mikitani serves as a board member). Rakuten has business units including travel, e-books, credit cards, online shopping, banking and the Rakuten Golden Eagles baseball team. By 2017, Rakuten had over 14,000 employees, over 42,000 shops on its e-commerce sites, and sales of nearly US$6 billion, with over 100 million members in Japan.

Beginning in March 2010, Mikitani implemented a plan that he calls "Englishnization", making English the primary language of Rakuten within two years. While the plan was dismissed as "stupid" by Honda president Takanobu Ito in 2010, Mikitani believes that "English is not an advantage anymore – it is a requirement." He considers the Japanese company's fluency in English, with meetings and reporting done in English, to be a strong advantage for the company globally. In 2011, Mikitani's Englishnization initiative was featured in a Harvard Business Review case study.

Mikitani has been president of Rakuten since its founding, and in 2001 he also became chairman. Among his other titles are Chairman of Rakuten Travel, Chairman of Rakuten Vissel Kobe football club, Director of PriceMinister, Director (chairman) of Rakuten Kobo, and chairman, Representative Director and team owner of Rakuten Baseball. He was named chairman of the Tokyo Philharmonic Orchestra in 2011.

=== Sports team ownership ===
In 1995, after an earthquake in Kobe caused significant damage so that the city could no longer maintain the Vissel Kobe football club, Mikitani was asked to take over operations of the team. He purchased the team later that year through his company Crimson Group. In 2014 the team was acquired by Rakuten.

In 2004, the Japanese Pacific League, amidst financial difficulties, dropped two teams, leading to a player strike. Mikitani was approached by league officials about putting together an expansion team in Sendai, which would be named the Tohoku Rakuten Golden Eagles. Mikitani rebuilt, restored and renovated the stadium in Sendai, prior to the team's inaugural season in 2005. The Golden Eagles won the 2013 Japan Series, two years after the 2011 earthquake and tsunami that devastated Sendai and the Tōhoku region.

=== Kosmos Holding ===
In 2017, Mikitani partnered with his friend FC Barcelona player Gerard Piqué to co-found Kosmos Holding. A holding company and investment group to invest in companies based in the sports, media, and entertainment industries. In 2018, Kosmos Holding acquired the Davis Cup Tennis property, and Spanish Futbol Club FC Andorra.

== Keidanren ==
Mikitani had joined Keidanren, the Japanese business federation in 2004. In June 2011, in the aftermath of the Fukushima nuclear disaster, he quit the federation, announcing his decision via Twitter before sending in his formal letter of resignation, saying it was no longer the same organization he had joined, and he disagreed with its support for continued reliance on the nuclear industry for electricity, and its reluctance to carry out reforms that could help Japan compete internationally. He subsequently pondered setting up a rival body.

On June 1, 2012, the Japanese Association of New Economy (JANE) was launched in Tokyo. It was a renaming of the "Japan e-business association", which had been established in February 2010 to open it to non-online businesses. Mikitani currently serves as the Representative Director of JANE.

== Philanthropy ==
On February 27, 2022, Mikitani announced ¥1 billion ($8.7 million) donation to the Ukrainian government to support it during the Russian invasion.

== Honors and awards ==
In 2012, Mikitani was awarded the Harvard Business School Alumni Achievement Award, one of the school's highest honors. He was also named to Prime Minister Shinzō Abe's Industrial Competitiveness Council.

In 2014, Mikitani was awarded the rank of Chevalier of the National Order of the Legion of Honour by the French government.

In 2017, Mikitani was awarded the Order of Merit of the Grand Duchy of Luxembourg. and the 2017 Spain-Japan Business Contribution Award by the Spanish Chamber of Commerce.

On 10 April 2024, Mikitani was among the guests invited to the state dinner hosted by U.S. President Joe Biden in honor of Prime Minister Fumio Kishida at the White House.

== Bibliography ==
- Principles for Success (2007)
- 92 Golden Rules of Success
- Marketplace 3.0: Rewriting the Rules of Borderless Business (St. Martin's Press, 2013)
- The Power to Compete: An Economist and an Entrepreneur on Revitalizing Japan in the Global Economy (with Ryoichi Mikitani, John Wiley & Sons, 2014)
- Business-Do: The Way to Successful Leadership (John Wiley & Sons, 2018)

== Personal life ==
Mikitani and his wife Haruko were married in 1993. They have two children.
