= Rakuten Rewards =

Shopping rewards company

- Industry: Cashback website
- Founded: 3 May 1998 in Menlo Park, California, United States
- Founders: Alessandro Isolani and Paul Wasserman
- Headquarters: San Mateo, California
- Area served: United States, Canada, China, South Korea, Singapore, Japan
- Key people: Amit Patel (CEO)
- Number of employees: 760 (worldwide, 2019)
- Parent: Rakuten
- Website: www.rakuten.com

Rakuten Rewards (/ˈrækətɪn/ RAK-ə-tin), formerly known as Ebates, is a cash-back and shopping rewards company. Its revenue comes from affiliate network links. Members of the site click through affiliate links before shopping at a retailer's site.

== History ==
Rakuten Rewards was founded as Ebates in 1998 in Menlo Park, California, by two former deputy district attorneys, Alessandro Isolani and Paul Wasserman. Funded by the venture capital firm Foundation Capital, Ebates.com was launched on 3 May 1999, offering up to 25% cash back from about 40 online retailers.

In September 2014, Ebates was acquired by the Japanese e-commerce company Rakuten for US$1 billion. In 2019, the Ebates brand was phased out and replaced with Rakuten Rewards.

== Acquisitions ==
Date	Company	Business	Country	References
8 September 2011	FatWallet	Comparison shopping site	United States	
9 August 2012	BFAds	Coupons site	United States	
8 September 2012	AnyCoupons	Coupons site	United States	
22 June 2012	OneReceipt	Receipt digitization service	United States	
10/12/2012	PushPins	Coupons mobile site	United States	
25 June 2013 sold 6 December 2017	Extrabux	Comparison shopping site	United States	
7 March 2016	Shopular	Product discovery mobile app	United States	
23 January 2017	Cartera Commerce	Rewards program provider	United States	
3 April 2017	ShopStyle (and Cosmic Cart)	Fashion discovery site	United States	

== Services/tools ==
Name	Description	References
Mobile app	Free application for Android and iOS allows users to shop and earn cash back on mobile devices.	
Hotels	Users can book hotels to earn cash back.	
Cash Back Button	Browser extension for Google Chrome, Edge, Firefox and Safari. Alerts users to cash-back possibilities on store sites and highlights offers in Google and Bing search results.	
Marketplace	Formerly located at Rakuten.com, the marketplace is an e-commerce site where users can buy goods from third-party sellers.	
In-Store Cash Back	Users can earn cash back in stores by adding a credit or debit card to their accounts and using that card to pay in stores.	

== Logos ==
2017

2018

2019 (US, before renaming)

2019 (Canada, before renaming)

2019 (US and Canada, after renaming)
