= Cashback website =

Type of reward website

A cashback website is a type of reward website (often also available on a mobile app) that pays its members a percentage of the money that they spend when they purchase goods and services via its affiliate links.

Leading cashback and similar programs providing U.S. consumers with rewards for shopping online with multiple vendors include Capital One Shopping, Ibotta, Rakuten Rewards and PayPal Honey.

== Customer journey ==
When a customer makes a purchase online, instead of visiting the retailer directly, they may choose to follow a link from a cashback website to generate a monetary reward when buying products or services. The cashback website receives a commission from the retailer that, after the purchase is confirmed, is shared with the customer who made the purchase.

== Cashback app ==
A cashback app is a mobile application that offers users a percentage of cashback or rewards for making purchases through the app. These apps provide users with savings on various transactions, including online shopping, bill payments, groceries, and services like insurance.

== Digital channels ==
Consumers can receive the cashback or similar rewards by searching on the cashback program's website, but usually also via its mobile app or browser extensions. The plugins may also alert consumers to better prices for the same product from the program's participating merchants, or to available discount coupons.

== Time frames ==
Users of cashback websites can know ahead of time how much they stand to get back for their purchases at each specific retailer before they buy. The amount of time that it takes to receive the cashback benefits is dependent on the site. Certain sites will make their payments every four to six weeks, while others will only issue their rebates after a few months. The time gap between purchase and cashback payment is observed to rule out cashback payment to cancelled or returned goods.

== Amount and forms of payment ==
Sites vary on what form of cashback rebates they offer their users. Some programs will provide the users with a percentage of the total purchase price, while others have a flat sum that they pay out for each action. Many cashback sites offer users a reward for referring others to the site.

Payment is generally made to the user in the form of bank transfers, gift vouchers, online sites such as PayPal, bank checks, mobile recharges or online orders at the request of the user. Some cashback websites place a threshold on a customer's account such that a user may need to make several transactions in order to be able to receive a reward.

Others sponsored by banks offer fixed or percent for purchases of certain items or from certain vendors that are given as a credit on the shopper's credit card bill.

== Other features ==
Some cashback sites also offer discussion forums, paid online surveys, daily deals, and other rewards to increase traffic and maintain customer loyalty.
