= Rakuten =

Japanese e-commerce and technology company

Rakuten Group, Inc.

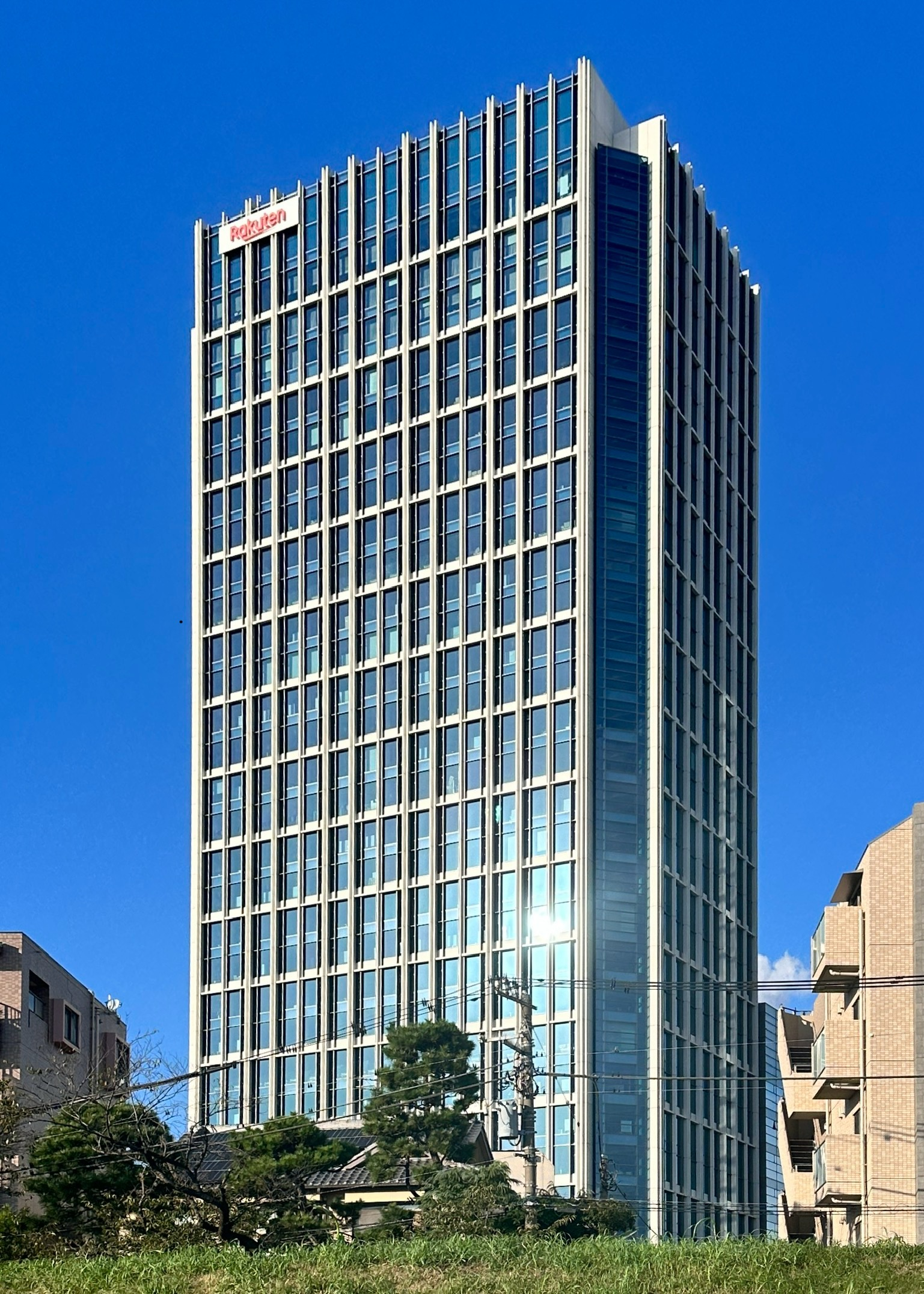
- Rakuten headquarters in Tamagawa, Setagaya, Tokyo
- Native name: 楽天グループ株式会社
- Romanized name: Rakuten Group kabushiki kaisha
- Formerly: MDM, Inc. (1997–1999)
- Type: Public company
- Traded as: TYO: 4755; TOPIX Large 70 component
- Industry: E-commerce; Financial technology; Telecommunications
- Founded: 7 February 1998; 28 years ago
- Founder: Hiroshi Mikitani
- Headquarters: Setagaya, Tokyo, Japan
- Area served: Worldwide
- Key people: Hiroshi Mikitani (Representative Director, Chairman, President and CEO); Masayuki Hosaka (Vice Chairman)
- Services: Online shopping, financial services, digital content, telecommunications
- Revenue: ▲¥2.279 trillion (2024)
- Operating income: ▼¥−194.7 billion (2024)
- Net income: ▼¥−135.8 billion (2024)
- Total assets: ¥16.8 trillion (2024)
- Total equity: ¥629 billion (2024)
- Number of employees: 29,334 (2024)
- Subsidiaries: Rakuten Mobile; Rakuten Kobo; Rakuten Viber; Rakuten Viki; Rakuten TV; Rakuten Rewards; Rakuten Monkeys
- Website: Official website

Rakuten Group, Inc. (楽天グループ株式会社, Rakuten Gurūpu kabushikigaisha) is a Japanese technology conglomerate headquartered in Tokyo. Founded in 1997 by Hiroshi Mikitani, the company operates a global system of internet services centered around its online retail marketplace Rakuten Ichiba.

Rakuten's businesses span e-commerce, financial technology services, digital content platforms and telecommunications. Major services include the messaging platform Rakuten Viber, the ebook distributor Rakuten Kobo, the video streaming service Rakuten Viki, and the Japanese telecommunications provider Rakuten Mobile. The company operates in more than 30 countries and regions and employs over 29,000 people worldwide.

Rakuten has been described as the "Amazon of Japan" due to the breadth of its online retail and digital services.

== History ==
=== Early years (1997–1999) ===
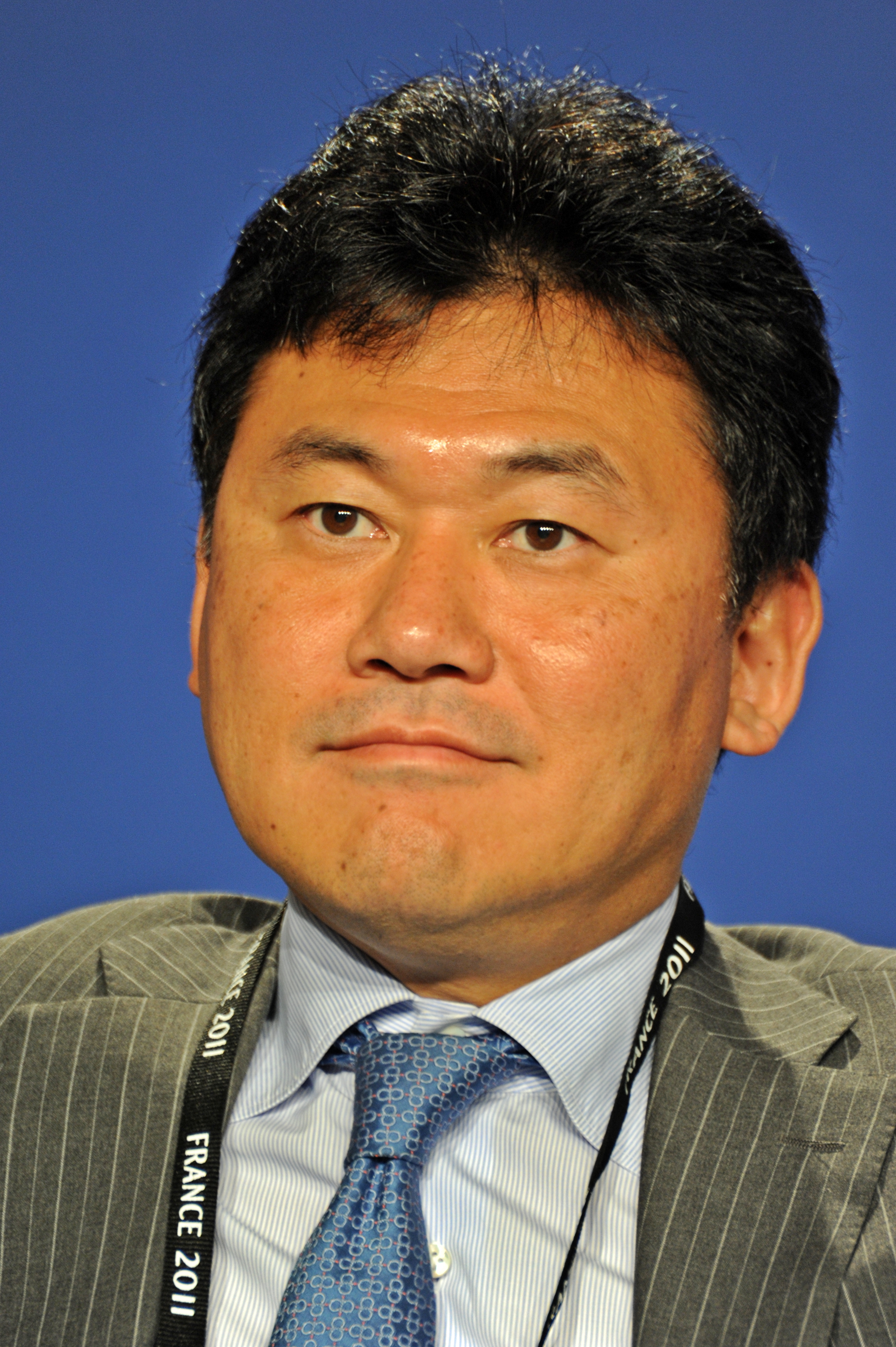
Hiroshi Mikitani, founder, chairman and CEO of Rakuten

Rakuten was founded as MDM, Inc. by Hiroshi Mikitani on 7 February 1997. The online shopping marketplace Rakuten Shopping Mall (楽天市場, Rakuten Ichiba) was officially launched on May 1, 1997. The company had six employees and the website had 13 merchants.

The name was changed to Rakuten in June 1999. The Japanese word rakuten (楽天) means 'optimism'.

Harvard-educated former banker Mikitani envisioned the site as an online shopping mall, offering the opposite of what the larger companies like IBM were trying to do with similar services, by offering empowerment to merchants rather than trying to tightly control the virtual storefront. The service was offered for a smaller fee than the larger Internet malls were charging, and merchants were given more control, such as the ability to customize their storefronts on the site.

=== 2000s ===
The company went public through an IPO on the JASDAQ market on April 19, 2000. At the time, the online marketplace had 2,300 stores and 95 million page views per month, making it one of the most popular sites in Japan.

In March 2001, the online hotel reservation service Rakuten Travel was launched.

In April 2002, a new system was introduced for merchants, combining monthly fixed fees with commissions on sales. That November, the Rakuten Super Point Program, a membership loyalty program, was introduced.

In September 2004, Rakuten grew its financial services businesses by acquiring consumer finance company Aozora Card Co., Ltd., later renaming it Rakuten Card Co., Ltd. The company began offering a Rakuten credit card in 2005. By November 2016, the Rakuten card was held by over 13 million people, and nearly 40% of Rakuten's revenue was from financial services, as it was operating Japan's largest Internet bank and third-largest credit company. Rakuten card holders are part of a point-based membership programme and can use those points to make purchases on the Internet mall. In 2016, the company introduced Rakuten Pay, an app-based smartphone payment system.

In October 2004, Rakuten Baseball was created, and the baseball team Tohoku Rakuten Golden Eagles was formed and joined Nippon Professional Baseball.

In 2005, Rakuten started expanding outside Japan, mainly through acquisitions and joint ventures.

In December 2005, Rakuten established the Rakuten Institute of Technology in Tokyo as its department in charge of research and development.

In a joint venture in February 2008, Rakuten and President Chain Store established Rakuten's first e-commerce site outside of Japan with Rakuten Ichiba Taiwan.

=== 2010s ===
Around 2011, Rakuten started heavily expanding outside of Japan, with prominent moves including a stake in Canadian e-book maker Kobo Inc. and an investment in Pinterest.

In 2011, Rakuten launched Indonesia's Rakuten Belanja Online.

By late 2012, Rakuten had moved into online retail in Austria, Canada, Spain, Taiwan and Thailand and the online travel markets in France—with Voyager Moins Cher.com—and China, Hong Kong, Korea and Taiwan—with its Tokyo-based international Rakuten Travel platform. In North America, Rakuten Golf made booking tee times online possible. To increase its global competitiveness, and to better incorporate non-Japanese speakers, Rakuten decided to adopt English as the company's official language starting in 2012. By 2016, nearly 40% of the company's engineers in Japan were non-Japanese.

In September 2014, Rakuten bought Ebates for $1 billion to enter online shopping membership rewards in Canada, China, Russia, South Korea, and the United States.

In January 2015, Rakuten entered the sport of football by acquiring Vissel Kobe, a top J1 League team formed in 1995.

In March 2015, Rakuten announced that it would begin accepting Bitcoin across its global marketplaces, shortly after investing in San Francisco–based Bitcoin payments-processing startup Bitnet Technologies. Rakuten has been a strong supporter of Bitcoin's potential and was one of the first major companies to accept Bitcoin for payment. In 2015, Rakuten relocated its corporate headquarters from Shinagawa to the Tamagawa neighbourhood of Setagaya-ku, to consolidate its Tokyo offices and to accommodate future growth.

In 2016, Rakuten shut down retailing websites in the UK, Spain, Austria, Singapore, Indonesia and Malaysia. In that year, the company lost its long status as the largest e-commerce site in Japan to Amazon Japan.

On November 16, 2016, Rakuten announced it had agreed to a four-year partnership with the La Liga football club FC Barcelona, one of the most successful football teams in Europe. The agreement would see Rakuten become FC Barcelona's main global partner beginning with the 2017-18 season, with its name appearing on match-day jerseys. The deal was worth at least €220 million and includes an option for a one-year extension.

In February 2017, Ebates and Rakuten acquired Shopstyle and its influencer marketing group, Collective, to extend into fashion curation, discovery and product search.

Rakuten partnered with California-based Blackstorm Labs to launch an online social gaming platform called R Games in April 2017, going live with 15 free games optimized for smartphones, including Pac-Man and Space Invaders. The games are based on HTML5, which can be played across any device and on any platform, and Rakuten will tap into its worldwide database of 114 million online shoppers. Rakuten plans to integrate R Games into its messaging app Viber.

In September 2017, Rakuten signed a three-year, $60 million deal to become the official sponsor for the jersey patch on the front of the uniforms for the Golden State Warriors of the NBA.

Rakuten partnered with Walmart for a late push on e-books in January 2018. The company announced plans to launch its cryptocurrency in March. In May 2018, Rakuten announced the fourth wireless mobile network in Japan, named Rakuten Mobile.

In June 2018 Ebates and Rakuten acquired Curbside to accelerate its online-to-offline offering to members and merchants.

In September 2019, negotiations successfully closed to acquire the Taiwanese baseball team, the Lamigo Monkeys. With the sale, Rakuten became the first foreign company to own a Chinese Professional Baseball League team. Terms of the deal were not disclosed. The team name was formally changed to the Rakuten Monkeys on 17 December 2019. New uniforms, similar in design to those of the Tohoku Rakuten Golden Eagles were released.

=== 2020s ===
In July 2020, Rakuten announced that it would be closing its online shop/marketplace in the United States, which formerly went under the name Buy.com. The marketplace closed to new orders on 15 September and shut down after all remaining orders had been fulfilled.

In September 2020, Rakuten launched its wireless carrier service's 5G network in some areas of Japan after it started 4G services in April. The company named its network technology the Rakuten Communications Platform (RCP) which makes use of cloud computing to lower the price and started sales activity abroad, gaining at least fifteen international customers by the spring of 2021.

On September 24, 2020, Rakuten announced that they would shut down their online marketplace in Germany. As of October 15, 2020, they no longer accept new orders while all orders before that date were to be fulfilled.

In March 2021, Rakuten announced at a joint press conference attended by CEO Mikitani and the President of Japan Post Holdings that Rakuten would allot more than 8 per cent stake to Japan Post Holdings for 150 billion yen, accepting Japan Post Holdings as the third-largest shareholder after the Mikitani family in the first-ever major capital tie-up for Rakuten, to be financially equipped to spend billions on installing telecommunications infrastructure across Japan in competition with rival Amazon Japan. Tencent and Walmart, the previous owners of Seiyu Group, now partially owned by Rakuten, also took stakes of 3.65% and 0.9% respectively.

In February 2022, Rakuten founder Hiroshi Mikitani donated ¥1 billion ($8.7 million) to humanitarian actions in Ukraine amid the 2022 Russian invasion of Ukraine.

In 2023, Rakuten partnered with Supermicro on high-performing Open Radio Access Network (RAN) and storage systems for operators of cloud-based mobile services.

On September 30, 2026, Rakuten France marketplace ceased operations.

On 1 October 2026, Rakuten completed a reorganisation of its financial-services business under which Rakuten Card and Rakuten Securities Holdings became wholly owned subsidiaries of Rakuten Bank. The transaction used newly issued Rakuten Bank shares as consideration for the acquired holdings.

== Acquisitions and investment ==
Rakuten has made several acquisitions since its inception in 1997. It began in the e-commerce field but made acquisitions in the fields of sports, banking, and insurance.

== Businesses ==
Rakuten, Inc. has more than 70 services operating via the three business segments: Internet Services, FinTech, and Mobile.

=== Internet Services Segment ===
The services constitute the Internet Services Segment are as follows:

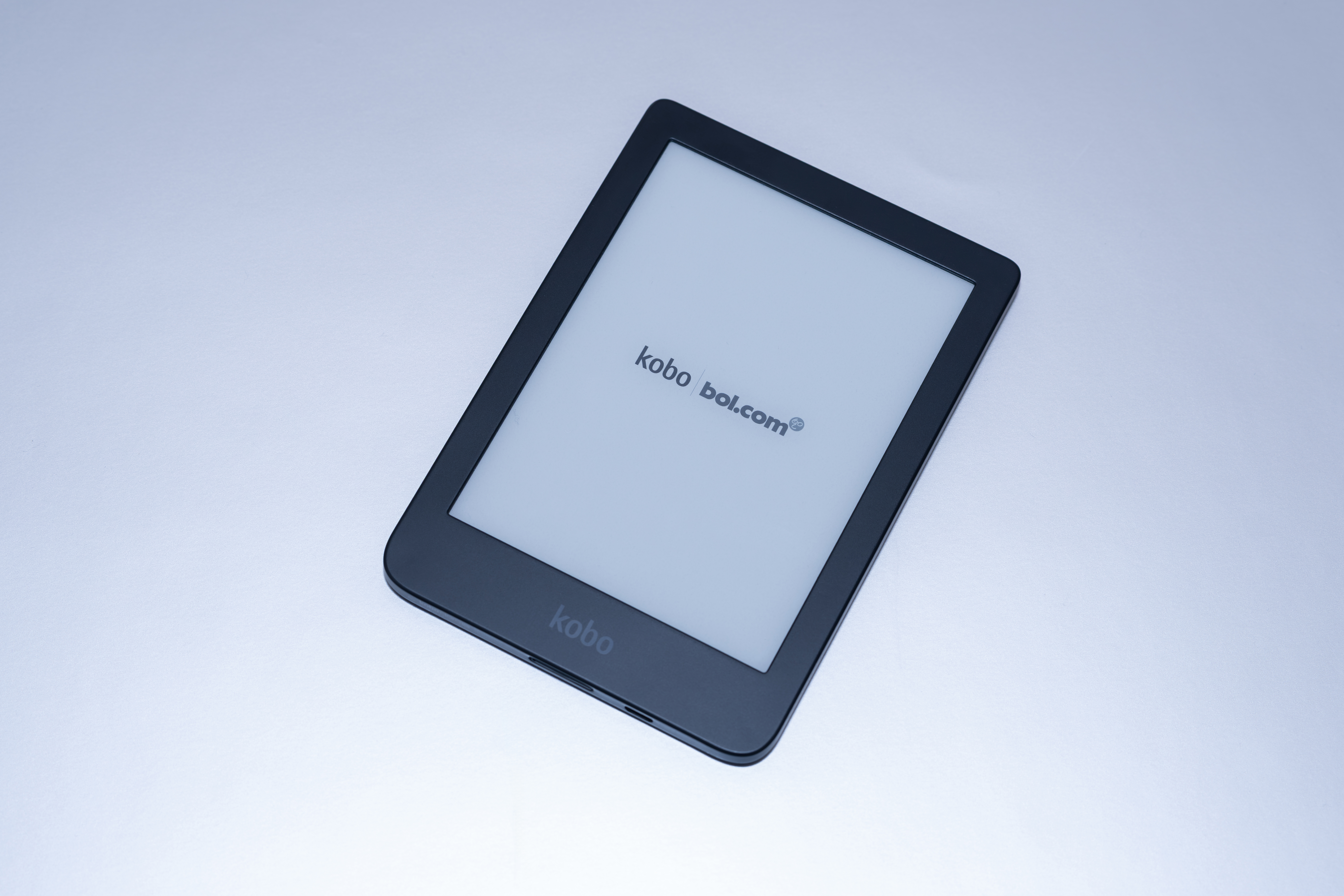
E-Book-Reader: Kobo Clara HD

- E-commerce
  - Rakuten Ichiba
  - Rakuten.co.uk
- Messaging app
  - Viber
- Food delivery
  - Rakuten Delivery
- Travel booking
  - Voyagin
- Online cash-back
  - Rakuten Rewards (formerly Ebates)
- Internet portal and digital content sites
  - Kobo Inc.
  - Rakuten DX (formerly Aquafadas)
  - Rakuten TV
  - Viki
- Marketing and data analysis
  - Rakuten Advertising
- Online Survey
  - Rakuten insight

=== FinTech Segment ===
The FinTech Segment operates the following businesses:

- Banking and securities
- Credit cards
- Life insurance
- Digital wallet

=== Mobile Segment ===
The services operating under the Mobile Segment are:

- Telecommunications network & sale of mobile devices
  - Rakuten Mobile

Rakuten Mobile Phones

- Rakuten Mini C330
- Rakuten Hand 5G
- Rakuten Big 5G

== Criticism ==
=== Corporate culture ===
In 2010, the founder and CEO, Hiroshi Mikitani, mandated that all business, from official meetings to internal emails, be written in English. Corporate officers that do not become proficient in English in two years were to be fired. At the time, only an estimated 10% of the Japanese staff could function in English, with the mandate facing criticism from other CEOs at the time.

Rakuten introduced the English-only policy, dubbed "Englishnization," as part of Mr Mikitani's push to "globalize" the company and its employees.

The new policy resulted in the resignation of some staff. Eventually, Rakuten decided to provide free English classes, offered time to study, and made clear that learning English was a part of employees' jobs.

While claiming it a success in 2012, it was not until 2015 that the average employee score on the Test of English for International Communication, or TOEIC, reached 802.6 out of a possible 990 points. A score above 800 indicates advanced proficiency.

TOEIC does face criticism, though, concerning its validity.

An example of official meetings held in English is "Asakai". It is a morning company-wide meeting that started on Saturdays but is now on Monday mornings at 8:00 am (JST).

=== Disabling product reviews ===
On July 17, 2012, the Kobo Touch eReader was launched in Japan to widespread criticism. The client app and networking were inoperational and devices could not be activated after purchase. A wave of 1-star reviews on Rakuten such as "my expectations were betrayed" were posted by angry consumers, after which the company disabled product reviews for the first time in its history. A Rakuten spokesman stated "In order to avoid confusion we will re-enable reviews after this issue is resolved. We do not plan to delete negative reviews. As a special case out of special cases, it was unavoidable that we took this action." However in opposition on July 27 CEO Hiroshi Mikitani later stated "Bad feedback is misinformation so we'll remove them and reinstate them after close review."

=== e-book advertising ===
On July 19, 2012, the Kobo e-bookstore launched. Advertising pamphlets for the Kobo Touch claimed a library of 30,000 Japanese titles when in reality only 19,164 were available. On July 27, 2012, after criticism about Kobo's available book selection, Mikitani vowed to "exceed 30,000 (books) within July" and "make 60,000 available by August." In reality, those marks were met on August 27 and September 24, respectively. In response, the Consumer Affairs Agency stated that Mikitani's promises and company marketing violated product misrepresentation laws and exerted pressure on the company. Rakuten issued an apology shortly after. The Kobo e-bookstore also included a repackaged version of 500 Wikipedia articles with a new ISBN in violation of Creative Commons license standards. Mikitani's tweet announcing its inclusion attracted criticism on the internet. The ISBN was later changed to a product code and the DRM was removed.

=== Price hiking ===
On 3 2014 it was reported that Rakuten was ordering vendors to artificially hike the MSRP of items. During sales e-commerce consultants reported that high numbers of consumers took advantage of sales and coupons. In turn, they recommended "multiply the MSRP" and have a 50% off sale to appeal to consumers. A drinks vendor was reportedly told to hike prices by 5x. Dummy product pages with inflated MSRP's were found to have passed Rakuten's inspection, hypothetically clearing it to be listed for sale. The Consumer Affairs Agency stated company practices violated product misrepresentation laws and requested the prevention of further incidents. Rakuten later issued an apology.

On 11/3 2017 to commemorate a Tohoku Rakuten Golden Eagles championship win Rakuten initiated a site-wide sale, with some vendors advertising 77% off their products. The company had claimed the sale would be a heavy financial burden but would consider it a "marketing cost." By 11/7 2013, it was revealed that 20 vendors and up to 1000 products were implicated in artificial price hikes. Products included iPhone 4S whose pre-sale price was listed as 43,3915 yen. A 10-pack of cream puffs previously sold for 2525 yen was advertised as 12,000 yen but 77% off (2500 yen). Under Consumer Affairs Agency standards such pricing was illegal. Rakuten initially denied liability and stated it was the actions of individual vendors but 3 of the 20 who had hiked prices were revealed to have received checks and approval from Rakuten employees. 17 out of the 20 offending vendors were given 1-month suspensions. They however remained anonymous and when asked if Rakuten would name vendors Mikitani stated, "1 month of suspension is too strict (for sellers) We're not the police and we think we do not have that right" 18 Rakuten employees were later revealed to have pressed the idea of inflated prices to vendors. The company issued an apology and vowed to create a monitoring team to prevent similar incidents.

=== Sale of ivory ===
In March 2014, the UK-based Environmental Investigation Agency (EIA) named the company as the world's biggest online retailer of whale meat and elephant ivory, calling on the company to stop selling the items. As a result of this, in April 2014, Rakuten announced that it was ending all online sales of whale and dolphin meat by the end of the month. In July 2017, Rakuten announced that it was also banning ivory sales on its sites.

== Recognition and awards ==
Rakuten partnered with Stephen Curry in 2023 on a one-day shopping spree at the Warriors Shop in Chase Center for twenty Bay Area children. Curry posed as a team shop employee during the event and helped find sports gear around the store.

- Best Operator 5G Innovation
- Ground-breaking Virtualization Initiative
- Forbes Top 100 Digital Companies 2019
- Forbes Top Regarded Companies 2019
- Linkedin Best companies to work for in Japan 2019
- Forbes World's Most Innovative Companies 2017

== See also ==
- Mercari
- Japan Open
- Rakuten Mobile
- Rakuten Monkeys
- Tohoku Rakuten Golden Eagles
- Vissel Kobe
- Yukihiro Matsumoto
