= Stephen Messer (entrepreneur) =

American Internet businessman

- Born: May 12, 1971 (age 55); Westchester County, New York, United States
- Education: Lafayette College, Benjamin N. Cardozo School of Law
- Occupation: Internet Entrepreneur
- Known for: Helping to create affiliate marketing sector

Stephen Messer (born May 12, 1971) is an American Internet entrepreneur, inventor and investor who has founded several global businesses, most notably LinkShare (sold in 2005 for $425 million) and Collective[i].

Messer served as LinkShare's CEO and chairman of the board, helping to create the sector of online marketing commonly referred to as affiliate marketing. Under his leadership, LinkShare expanded its network of websites to become one of the largest of its kind with its global reach extending from the United States to Japan, Canada and Europe. Messer was a board member of both LinkShare and LinkShare Japan until 2006.

== Early life ==
The second child of two entrepreneurs, Messer was born in Westchester, New York. He attended Horace Greely High School in Chappaqua, New York. From the time he was 14, he worked in the family real estate business.

== College and law school ==
Messer earned a BA degree with dual majors in Government and Law as well as History from Lafayette College in Pennsylvania and was made a member of Phi Alpha Theta (the National History Honor Society). Messer earned a JD from the Benjamin N. Cardozo School of Law in New York City.

== Career ==
=== Early career ===
Messer began his career as the assistant director of the Columbia Institute for Tele-Information (CITI) from 1995 to 1996 working with Columbia Business School professor Eli Noam. While at CITI, Messer covered Cybercommunications (the Internet), the Telecommunications Act of 1996 and other key mass media issues of the time. Messer has remained an affiliated research fellow at CITI and is a regular speaker at Columbia Business School on topics ranging from electronic commerce to emerging technologies.

=== LinkShare Corporation ===
In 1996, Messer recognized the Internet's enormous potential, and with his sister, Heidi Messer, set out to create an online distribution network that would allow websites to monetize their traffic through performance based links. Messer recruited Cheryl Ho and Horace Meng to help he and his sister create LinkShare Corporation.

The company initially faltered, landing only 15 clients in its first year despite the Messers' extensive efforts. By year three, though, it regained its footing and took off, with 150 businesses signing up to take advantage of this new revenue concept. Messer served as chairman and CEO of LinkShare until its sale in 2005 to Rakuten Inc. for $425 million. In 2006, Messer exited the company, which was later renamed Rakuten LinkShare.

Messer was awarded patents around the concept of affiliate marketing. The first of these patents, which covered a cookie-less way of tracking commission information, was covered in the NY Times.

=== Collective[i] ===
In 2008, Messer co-founded Cross Commerce Media with his sister Heidi Messer and Tad Martin. He currently serves on its board of directors as the company's vice chairman.

In 2014, Messer was awarded three patents in conjunction with Collective[i]'s data analytics network. He is noted as a co-inventor for patent #8,713,076 and patent #8,825,716, "Providing a Multi-Tenant Knowledge Network", as well as patent #8,825,618, "Methods and Systems for Enhanced Data Unification, Access, and Analysis".

=== Angel investing and board affiliations ===
Messer is also co-founder of World Evolved, a platform for global investment and expansion, an adviser to Industry Ventures, Tribeca Venture Partners, Massive Incorporated (acquired by Microsoft), Loyaltylab (acquired by Tibco), and Netplenish. Additionally, he is an investor in numerous start-up ventures such as DODOcase, the space satellite company Spire, and Lifebooker. He is a director with Edison Partners. Messer has sat on or currently sits on the boards of Cross Commerce Media, d/b/a Collective[i], LifeBooker LLC, and Vente (acquired by Experian). Messer is active in the Silicon Alley start-up community and is an avid cyclist and yoga practitioner.

== Awards and honors ==
In 2004, Messer was named as a finalist for the American Business Awards. In 2005, Messer was awarded the Ernst and Young Entrepreneur of the Year Award for the New York Region. Messer was selected by the Silicon Alley Reporter as one of the top 100 executives in Silicon Alley in 2008.
