= Harvey J. Levin =

American economist (1924–1992)

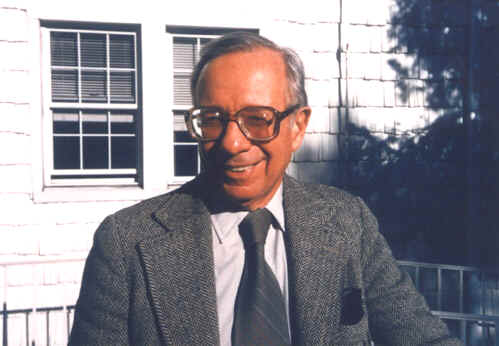
- Born: July 1, 1924; New York, New York
- Died: April 30, 1992 (aged 67)

Academic background
- Education: Columbia (Ph.D. 1953, A.M. 1948); Hamilton (A.B. '44)
- Influences: John Kenneth Galbraith; John Maynard Keynes; Broadus Mitchell; William Vickrey

Academic work
- Discipline: Regulatory economics, Communications economics
- Institutions: Hofstra University (1955–92); Columbia (1953–55, 1947–49); Penn State (1950–54); Bard (1949–50); Rutgers (1948–49)

Harvey Joshua Levin (July 1, 1924 – April 30, 1992) was an American economist. He was university research professor in the Department of Economics at Hofstra University (1989–92), Augustus B. Weller Professor of Economics at Hofstra (1964–89), and founder and director of its Public Policy Workshop (1975–92). He had previously served as professor at Columbia University. He was also a senior research associate at the Center for Policy Research.

Levin is generally considered the first economist to propose the auctioning of broadcast frequencies as a means of allocating the airwaves as a natural resource. His work anticipated the evolution of television, satellites, cellular telephones, electronic remote boxes and wireless internet, and their demands on increasingly congested airwaves.

He consulted for the President's Office of Telecommunications Management, the Federal Communications Commission (FCC), the FCC's Public Advisory Committee on the World Administrative Radio Conferences (WARC88), the Office of Technology Assessment of the U.S. Congress, the General Accounting Office, the Committee for Economic Development, the Department of Justice/Antitrust Division, and the Federal Trade Commission/Bureau of Economics.

== Early life ==
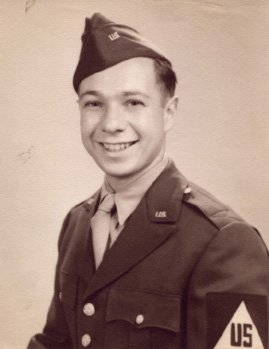
Harvey J. Levin in the U.S. Office of Strategic Services in 1944

Growing up in an uneducated family of Jewish-Russian descent, Levin was accepted by Harvard University as an undergraduate in 1940 at the age of sixteen, after skipping two grades at Newton High School in Queens, New York. However, his family found it unaffordable and considered him too young for such a large institution. He partially worked his way through high school and college as a jazz pianist/arranger and later attended Harvard Law School as a Carnegie Fellow in Law and Economics.

Originally planning to pursue English literature, he became fluent in seven other languages, including Japanese, by his college years. While an undergraduate student, he served as a commentator and disc jockey for the radio station of Hamilton College.

In World War II, he served as a Research Analyst and Foreign Language Officer in the Office of Strategic Services (later reorganized as the Central Intelligence Agency) in Washington, D.C. and Japan, drawing largely on his Japanese language skills.

== Career ==
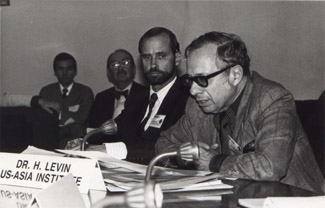
Harvey J. Levin testifying in the 1970s

For forty years spanning five decades, Levin researched, published, and proposed innovative economic and regulatory solutions that anticipated — and later addressed — the problems of competing rights and access to the airwaves, or electromagnetic spectrum, and its overuse and congestion. According to his colleagues, he was several decades ahead of his time in addressing the economic ramifications of the radio spectrum, long before others were concerned with the airwaves as a resource.

Focusing on its political ramifications, Levin's work is also considered by many economists to be the first to illustrate the economic necessity and benefits of equitable, global allocation of the airwaves as a limited resource, and diversification of its ownership. He continued to penetrate the frontiers of communications economics even after it evolved into a highly pertinent field — an evolution due, in large part, to his own contributions. His colleagues in the field even complained that they were unable to complete the writing of a book he had started at the time of his death because his work was "too advanced" and far-reaching.

Although he was a stickler for scientific evidence and economic viability, he also viewed economics as an art, and saw it as a vehicle for facilitating social progress. Among his proposals was a pricing mechanism that, in effect, ensured that latecomer users and emerging, underdeveloped countries would not be deprived of their use of the airwaves by the world powers or monopolies controlling the market. One of his last projects involved getting countries with satellites in orbit above less-industrialized nations to pay a kind of rent.

In pioneering the economics of the airwaves and space satellites by proposing market-based approaches to utilizing the spectrum, Levin was often met with skepticism and dismissal by government and industry officials — even, initially, disbelief that the airwaves were a resource at all. It prompted his creation of the phrase "The Invisible Resource", also the name of his 1971 book, which revolutionized the field.

== Legacy ==
Three years after his death, in 1995, the Federal Communications Commission (FCC) began implementing Levin's long controversial proposals by licensing and auctioning off portions of the radio spectrum, or broadcast frequencies, culminating in the U.S. Telecommunications Act of 1996. In 1997, partially inspired by Levin's research, the U.S. Congress recommended a voucher program for allocating the use of outer space for transportation and satellites, in its appropriations bill for the National Aeronautics and Space Administration (NASA).

His field of work continues to be developed by such colleagues as Molly Macauley, Eli Noam and Thomas Hazlett.

His legacy lives on in his numerous publications, in U.S. communications policy, in his collections of personal papers at Columbia Institute for Tele-Information (CITI), Hofstra University Archives and Research Libraries Information Network, and in the work of scholars and think tank groups like CITI and Resources for the Future.

== Sponsorship ==
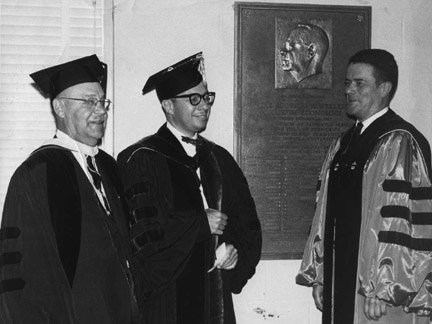
Pictured from left to right: Meadow Brook National Bank Chairman and Hofstra Trustee Augustus B. Weller, Harvey J. Levin, and Hofstra President Clifford Lord

On September 23, 1964, Hofstra University's board of trustees awarded the newly created Augustus B. Weller Chair in Economics (Long Island's first fully endowed professorial chair) to Harvey J. Levin, then chairman of the university's Economics Department, who held it for the next twenty-five years. The chair supported Levin's research that served as the basis for numerous articles and presentations, as well as his books The Invisible Resource – Use and Regulation of the Radio Spectrum (1971) and Fact and Fancy in Television Regulation – An Economic Study of Policy Alternatives (1980), and initial groundwork for the follow-up book Harvesting the Invisible Resource – Global Spectrum Management for Balanced Information Flows (originally scheduled for publication in 1994.)

Along with the Augustus B. Weller Chair in Economics at Hofstra University (1964–89), Levin's research was supported in part by the National Science Foundation (1984–88, 1970–78), the Russell Sage Foundation (1978–79), and Resources for the Future (1980–82, 1964–69).

He was a visiting fellow, Center for Strategic and International Studies, Georgetown University, 1982–83, and a visiting scholar, Stanford University (Department of Economics/National Bureau of Economic Research, Hoover Institute, Center for Educational Research at Stanford), Summers 1982–91.

He was also a Liberal Arts (Carnegie) Fellow in Law and Economics at the Harvard Law School, 1963–64, and a Brookings National Research Professor in Economics, 1959–60.

== Publications ==
Among other studies, Levin was author of Fact and Fancy in Television Regulation – An Economic Study of Policy Alternatives (Russell Sage Foundation and Basic Books, Inc., 1980), The Invisible Resource – Use and Regulation of the Radio Spectrum (Johns Hopkins Press, 1971), Broadcast Regulation and Joint Ownership of Media (New York University Press, 1960), and Business Organization and Public Policy (Holt-Rinehart, 1958), a collection of essays edited with commentary. At the time of his death, he was at work on a subsequent book, Harvesting the Invisible Resource – Global Spectrum Management for Balanced Information Flows, which was to be published by Oxford University Press.

He also published numerous scholarly papers on public policies towards television broadcasting, space satellites and the radio spectrum resource, and participated frequently in conference panels on the same, for the American Economics Association, the Annenberg Washington Program, the Atlantic Economic Society, the International Institute of Communications, the Institute of Electrical and Electronics Engineers, the International Communications Association, the National Academy of Engineering, the National Academy of Sciences, the National Research Council, the Pacific Telecommunications Council, the Annual Telecommunications Policy Research Conferences, and the Western Economic Association International.

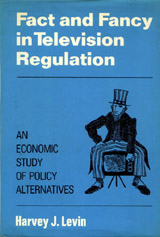
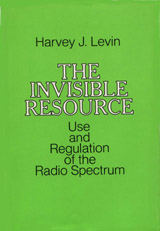
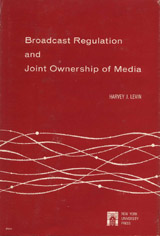
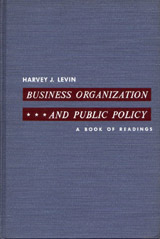
Publications of Levin

== Quotes on Levin ==
In 1971 Resources for the Future funded and published a book calling for the government to create a market for radio spectrum licenses, rather than just giving them away. After all, said the author, Harvey J. Levin, the airwaves are a scarce resource, and they are no less susceptible than rivers or roads to overuse or congestion. Because the Federal Communications Commission was allocating spectrum space bureaucratically, incumbent broadcasters had no reasons to economize or innovate, while newcomers were often locked out. Levin, an economist, proposed 'a regulated market-type system with prices.' And the government took Levin's advice – in the mid-1990s, when the FCC finally began auctioning off broadcast frequencies. Well, it only took a generation.

— Jonathan Rauch, National Journal

In the world of economists, his ideas were not radical, but in the world that would need to use them, they were ... Levin concluded that market-like mechanisms, rather than administrative hearings, would better allocate the increasingly crowded electromagnetic spectrum, or airwaves, to their myriad uses (ranging from radio, TV, and everyday telecommunications to wildlife tracking, astronomy, garage door openers, and national defense). Levin's research paved the way for a change of heart at the U.S. Federal Communications Commission [in auctioning] portions of the spectrum. By 1997, auctions had brought in more than $22 billion and, more important, according to the Economic Report of the President for that year, the auctions got spectrum 'quickly into the hands of service providers' and 'rapidly promoted the use of innovative, advanced telecommunications technologies throughout the country' ... In 1997, the U.S. Congress included a demonstration program for space transportation vouchers in its appropriations bill for the National Aeronautics and Space Administration. Much of the inspiration ... was inspired by Levin's research. The field of space economics and policy has grown from one or two economists during Levin's career to include scholars at Caltech, MIT, the Wharton School, and other institutions."

— Molly K. MaCauley, Senior Fellow, Resources for the Future

The classic overview of spectrum technology, economics, and public policy is Harvey J. Levin['s] The Invisible Resource ... He was truly several decades ahead of his time ... In some areas, people still haven't caught up to him. For example, I have yet to find anybody else provide a more thoughtful spectrum leasing analysis – a very timely topic here in D.C.

— J. H. Snider, Senior Research Fellow, New America Foundation

He was ... universally well thought of ... The FCC sponsored a conference on spectrum called 'The Invisible Resource.' Harvey was a featured speaker ... It was the 30th of April, 1991 – one year to the day he died ... He had truly been one of the pioneers in broadcast regulation, and we both liked to think that I was following in his footsteps.

— Thomas W. Hazlett, Chief Economist, Federal Communications Commission (1992)

He was a notable scholar ... in ways that were an example for all of us: his commitment and all of the other things that went with it, his constant peregrinations in search of bringing his message to people all over this country and the rest of the world ... With all his ways and his accomplishments, Harvey, above all, was a true original, and he was an original in a time that breeds all too many hollow men, if not stuffed men.

— John E. Ullmann, Professor of Management and Quantitative Methods, Hofstra University School of Business

In his professional, civic and personal life, he strived to improve the rights, opportunities, facilities and technologies of the disadvantaged, in America as well as in his own backyard, and in third world countries. With zeal, optimism, humor and irony, he proposed innovative policies regarding orbit spectrum assignments and broadcast frequency auctions to skeptical and dismissing industry officials. In the face of industry and government laissez faire, he remained the true believer. His proposals were vindicated four years after his death with the passage of the U.S. Telecommunications Act – a 'promised land' he'd seen but didn't live to experience.

— Adam R. Levin

== Honors ==
In 1986, Levin was elected to membership in the Cosmos Club of Washington, D.C., an association of persons deemed to "have done meritorious original work in science, literature, or the arts, or ... recognized as distinguished in a learned profession or in public service".

That year, he also was invited to place his papers in the Archive of Contemporary History at the University of Wyoming, devoted to "the history and development ... of individuals who have played a prominent role in the twentieth century's social, political, legal and economic scene ..."

== Other affiliations and activism ==
Levin was a member of the editorial board of Telecommunications Policy (1989–92), and the Society of Columbia Scholars and Harvard Law School Association of New York City (1991–92).

He was also civically active with such organizations as the National Emergency Civil Liberties Committee, the National Citizens Committee for Broadcasting, the Committee To Protect Journalists, the Long Island Alliance for Peaceful Alternatives, and the Long Island Coalition for Fair Broadcasting Honorary Advisory Board.

He worked with public figures ranging from Eleanor Roosevelt and Fred Friendly to George McGovern, and contributed opinion pieces to various journals including The New York Times and The Nation. He delivered numerous community presentations dealing with censorship and legislation in Congress that impacted First Amendment rights.

== Bibliography ==
- Atlantic Monthly, "Ideas Change the World – And One Think Tank Quietly Did," Jonathan Rauch, October 8, 2002
- CITI 1993–1994 Annual Report, "Affiliated Research Fellows: In Memory of Harvey Levin," Columbia Institute for Tele-Information, Columbia University School of Business
- Contemporary Authors, "Harvey J(oshua) Levin, 1924–1992," Gale Group, August 22, 2003
- Contemporary Authors, Vol. 137, Gale Research Inc., 1992
- Contemporary Authors, Vols. 9–12, Gale Research Company, 1974
- Economic Principles, "Short Takes," ed. David Warsh, October 20, 2002
- Explanation of the Citizen's Guide to the Airwaves, New America Foundation (J.H. Snider), July 1, 2003
- Folio, "The Harvey J. Levin Papers," Michael J. Robinson, Processing Archivist, Hofstra University Axxinn Library, July 1994 issue
- Hamilton College Alumni Review, Vol. 57, No. 2, Fall–Winter 1992–93
- Hamilton College Class of 1944 50th Reunion Yearbook, Spring 1994
- Hamilton College Class of 1944 40th Reunion Yearbook, June 1–3, 1984
- Hofstra University Archives Faculty Collection: Harvey J. Levin
- Hofstra University Archives, Guide to the Harvey J. Levin (1924–1992) Papers, 1947–1992 (bulk dates, 1954–1992), 13 c.f., Michael J. Robinson, Processing Archivist, June 1994
- Hofstra University News Bureau, "Papers of Communications Economics Pioneer on Exhibit", August 1994
- Hofstra University News Bureau, "Personal Papers of Telecommunications Pioneer Donated to Hofstra University," January 27, 1994
- Levin, Adam R., "Remarks at 75th Session of Harvey J. Levin Public Policy Workshop", Hofstra University, November 20, 1992
- Levin, Harvey J., Detailed Summary of Scholarly Work and Interests
- Levin, Harvey J., Fact and Fancy in Television Regulation – An Economic Study of Policy Alternatives, Russell Sage Foundation and Basic Books, Inc., 1980
- Levin, Harvey J., Harvesting the Invisible Resource – Global Spectrum Management for Balanced Information Flows, 1991
- Levin, Harvey J., The Invisible Resource – Use and Regulation of the Radio Spectrum, Johns Hopkins Press, 1971
- Levin, Harvey J., Papers and Publications, 1950–1991
- Levin, Harvey J., Professional Bio
- Levin, Harvey J., Resume, 1944–1990
- Long Island Library Resources Council, "Hofstra University Archives Awarded Documentary Heritage Program Grant," February 3, 1994
- Long Island Press, "Weller Chair Filled," May 14, 1964
- "Memorial Service for Harvey Joshua Levin", Hofstra University, May 19, 1992 (video recording)
- National Journal, "Ideas Change the World – And One Think Tank Quietly Did," Jonathan Rauch, October 5, 2002
- National Research Council/National Academy of Sciences conference, June 15, 1987 (audio recording)
- New York Times, "Gets Grant," May 14, 1964
- New York Times, "Harvey J. Levin, 67, Economics Professor," May 5, 1992
- Newsday, "Harvey Joshua Levin, Professor at Hofstra," Estelle Lander, May 4, 1992
- Newsday, "Hofstra Prof Gets An Endowed Chair," May 14, 1964
- Reasonline: Free Minds and Free Markets, "Ideas Change the World – And One Think Tank Quietly Did," Jonathan Rauch, October 7, 2002
- Resources, "Reflections", Molly K. Macauley, Summer 2002 issue
- Resources, "RFF Redux: Revisiting The Invisible Resource – Use and Regulation of the Radio Spectrum", Fall 1996 issue
- Resources for the Future: RFF's Legacy
- Resources for the Future 50th Anniversary Symposium, October 15, 2002
- Resources for the Future 50th Anniversary Symposium, "Welcoming Remarks," Paul Portney, October 15, 2002
- San Francisco Chronicle, "Harvey J. Levin, 67, Economics Professor," May 5, 1992
- Social Studies Commentary, "Ideas Change the World – And One Think Tank Quietly Did," Jonathan Rauch, October 4, 2002
