= Blue Book Top 20 Network Rankings =

The Performance Marketing Blue Book, owned by privately held mThink LLC, provides online affiliates and merchants with an independently researched ranking of affiliate networks worldwide. It is published in the form of two "Top 20" league tables, one for CPA networks and one for networks using a revenue sharing business model, cost-per-sale. The tables are updated each year from the results of an annual research-based process that includes a survey of over 20,000 online publishers and advertisers. The Blue Book has been produced each year since 2009 and is a recognized information resource within the performance marketing industry.

== Methodology ==
The Blue Book is based upon a research process that incorporates multiple sources of affiliate marketing industry data and includes over 500 affiliate networks each year. One major component is an annual survey of over 20,000 online publishers and merchants. The survey includes anti-fraud security measures to prevent multiple responses from a single individual as well question structured to avoid selection-bias. In addition to the survey, the research process aggregates industry expert views, traffic data, measures of industry influence and other information.

== The Blue Ribbon Panel ==
The Blue Ribbon Panel is a group of performance marketing industry experts representing each of the three core parts of the industry: advertisers, publishers and networks. Members are selected on the basis of their experience and reputation. Their opinions are collected via interviews and online survey, and are incorporated into the research process for the Performance Marketing Blue Book.
