= PayPal Honey =

American technology company

Honey Science Corporation

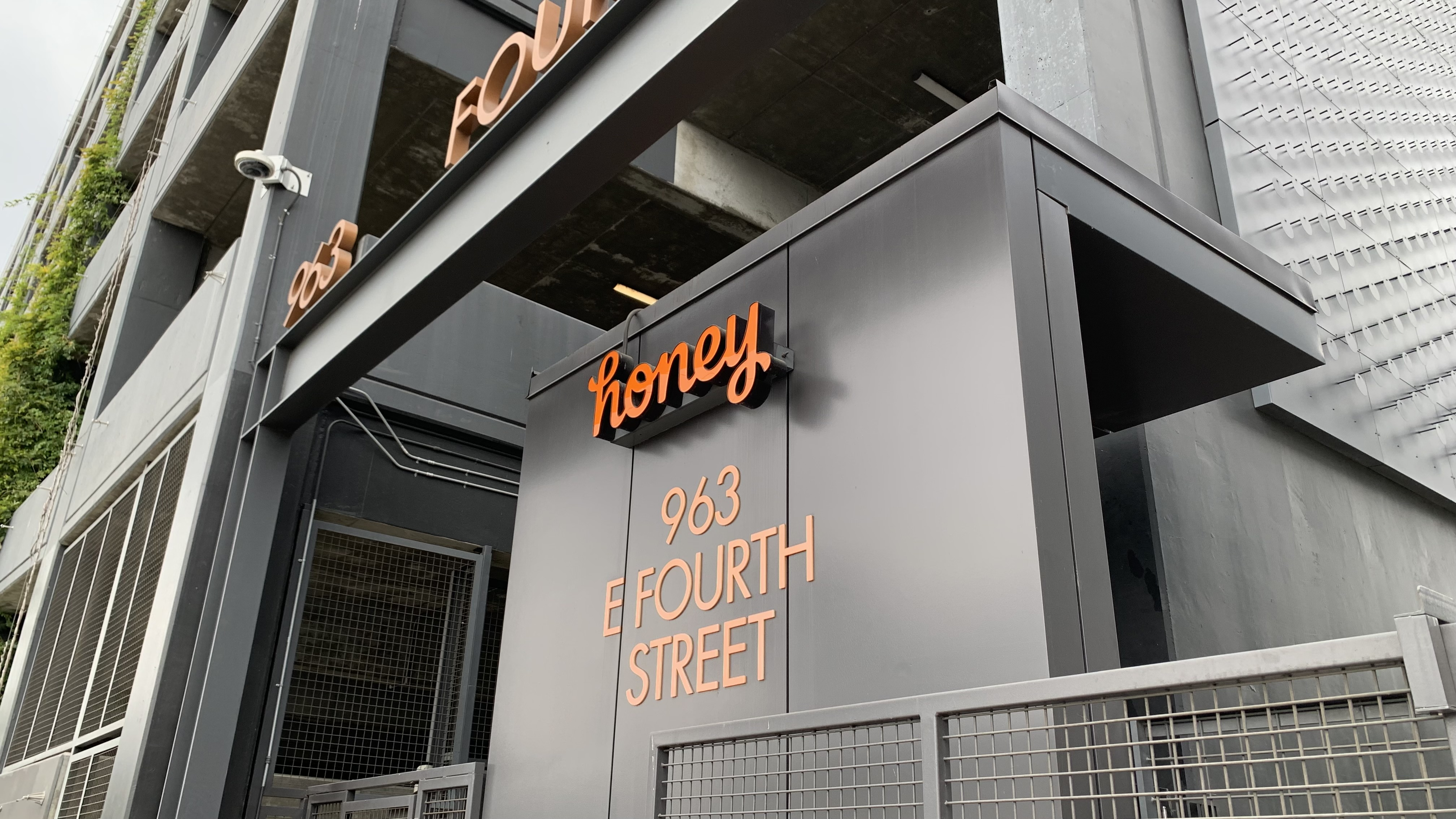
- Headquarters in Los Angeles, California
- Trade name: PayPal Honey
- Type: Subsidiary
- Industry: Cashback website, online coupons
- Founded: November 8, 2012; 14 years ago
- Founders: George Ruan; Ryan Hudson; Brian Silverstein
- Headquarters: Los Angeles, California, United States
- Key people: George Ruan (CEO)
- Number of employees: 200 (worldwide, Nov 2018)
- Parent: PayPal
- Website: joinhoney.com

Honey Science Corporation (d/b/a PayPal Honey, previously Honey) is an American technology company and subsidiary of PayPal. It is known for developing a browser extension that automatically applies online coupons on e-commerce websites. Founded in 2012 by Ryan Hudson and George Ruan in Los Angeles, California, the company was acquired by PayPal in 2020 for approximately $4 billion. Honey has come under scrutiny for overriding affiliate links and using misleading advertising.

== History ==
Entrepreneurs Ryan Hudson and George Ruan founded Honey in November 2012 in Los Angeles after building a prototype of the browser extension in late October 2012. A bug tester leaked the prototype to Reddit, where it gained adoption. By March 2014, the company had 900,000 organic users.

In 2014, Honey raised a seed round of approximately $1.8 million from a group of investors that included Mucker Capital, Bam Ventures, Ludlow Ventures, and SXE Ventures.

Honey raised a $26 million Series C round, led by Anthos Capital in March 2017. By January 2018, Honey had raised $40.8 million in venture backing. In 2020, it was acquired by PayPal for about $4 billion, after which it became part of PayPal's rewards program.

In December 2019, Amazon told its users that the extension was a security risk that sold personal information. A Wired magazine article, written shortly after the acquisition, questioned whether the claim was motivated by PayPal's newly acquired ability to compete against Amazon.

In 2020, the Better Business Bureau started to investigate a Honey advertisement claiming: "With just a single click, Honey will find every working code on the internet and apply the best one to your cart". Honey told the BBB that it was already taking steps to discontinue the ad, and after it did so, the investigation was closed.

In 2022, the company's trade name was changed to PayPal Honey.

=== Business practice allegations and lawsuits ===
In December 2024, YouTuber MegaLag released a video alleging that the Honey browser extension re‑attributes sales made through affiliate marketing programs by modifying affiliate links at checkout, crediting Honey with the sales even when no coupon was applied. This practice was described as a form of cookie stuffing. The video further alleged that Honey enables partnered vendors to control which discount codes users see by excluding more favorable codes.

In response, PayPal told The Verge, "Honey follows industry rules and practices, including last‑click attribution." PayPal also told USA Today that merchants determine which coupons are offered through Honey.

Following the controversy, Honey lost approximately 3 million of its 20 million users within two weeks of the allegations becoming public. In March 2025, Google updated its Chrome Web Store policies to prohibit extensions from claiming affiliate commissions without providing discounts. Honey then modified its extension to stop claiming affiliate revenue in cases where no discount was applied. By May 2025, Honey had lost more than 4 million users, and similar class action lawsuits were filed against competitors such as Microsoft Shopping and Capital One Shopping, which were accused of engaging in comparable practices.

On December 21, 2025, MegaLag released a second video with additional allegations against Honey's business model. The video alleged that Honey scraped private coupon codes and shared them with its user base without the knowledge of the original users, refusing to remove the codes when contacted by businesses. Instead, Honey allegedly encouraged businesses to partner directly with the platform. The video also alleged that Honey collected personalized user data beyond shopping activity.

A third video, released on December 30, 2025, alleged that Honey incorporated code into its extension to evade detection by affiliate networks, which prohibit tools from replacing existing publisher codes with their own. By the end of 2025, Honey had lost approximately 8 million users on the Chrome Web Store. PayPal acknowledged the code on January 12, 2026, and announced that they had disabled it. Following the release of this video, Honey sent a cease-and-desist notice to MegaLag, which was thrown out.

On January 12, 2026, Rakuten Advertising removed Honey from its affiliate network. According to MegaLag, Rakuten knew of Honey's business practices as early as 2020 and had tried to send an email to stand down to PayPal, which PayPal ignored.

==== Class action lawsuits ====
On December 29, 2024, three law firms, including one operated by YouTuber LegalEagle, filed a class action lawsuit against PayPal in United States federal court in connection with the alleged affiliate marketing controversy. The suit alleged intentional interference with contractual and prospective economic relations, unjust enrichment, conversion, and violation of California's Unfair Competition Law. Sam Denby of Wendover Productions and Ali Spagnola were named as plaintiffs.

The controversy gained further traction on January 3, 2025, when the technology review outlet GamersNexus filed another class action lawsuit through law firm Cotchett, Pitre & McCarthy, LLP. The suit alleged conversion, interference with contractual relations, and violations of North Carolina's Unfair and Deceptive Trade Practices Act.

The initial class action lawsuit was dismissed in late November 2025, however other lawsuits were allowed to proceed. Federal Judge Beth Labson Freeman said that the complaint had not identified a "cognizable injury" and did "not establish the Plaintiffs were in fact entitled to those commissions pursuant to their contracts with the merchants." The court granted leave to amend the case and the plaintiffs filed an amended complaint in early January 2026.

== Marketing ==
PayPal Honey has become known for its heavy use of YouTube advertising and channel sponsorships for its marketing. Like other services, it offers paid sponsorships to popular YouTube channels to advertise the service to their viewers.

Starting in the 2019–20 NBA season, Honey became a practice jersey sponsor for the Los Angeles Clippers, a sponsorship that expanded to game jerseys in the 2020–21 NBA season. The jersey sponsorship ended after the 2022–23 NBA season.

== Operations ==
PayPal Honey operates a browser extension that automatically applies coupons on e-commerce websites. The company has claimed that the extension aggregates these coupons across the internet. Honey's revenue comes from a commission made on user transactions with partner retailers. When a user makes a purchase from merchants partnering with the company, Honey provides Honey Gold points, which can be redeemed at partnering stores to get additional coupons and offers. Other features of the browser extension include Droplist, with which a user can add an item to a list and be notified when its price drops across partnered retailers, and Amazon Badge, which compares a product's prices across multiple resellers on Amazon, enabling users to switch to a cheaper reseller.
