= Heidi Messer =

American entrepreneur (born 1969)

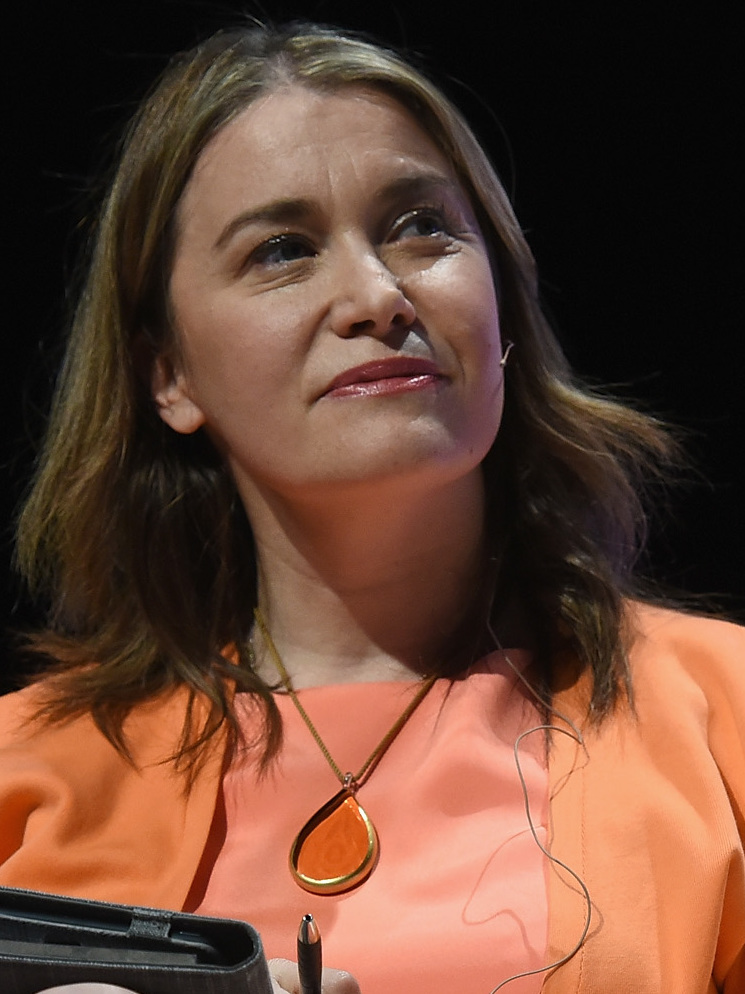
- Born: August 28, 1969 (age 57); Westchester County, New York
- Education: Brown University, Harvard Law School
- Occupations: Co-founder, Chairman, Collective[i] Co-founder, CEO, World Evolved; Co-founder, President and COO, LinkShare.
- Website: collectivei.com

Heidi Messer (born August 28, 1969) is an American entrepreneur and investor who has founded several global businesses, most notably LinkShare and Collective[i]. Messer served as a board member, President, and Chief Operating Officer of LinkShare, contributing to the sector of online marketing commonly referred to as affiliate marketing.

== Early life ==
Messer was born in Westchester County, New York. She is the eldest child of two entrepreneurs. Her paternal and maternal grandparents were also entrepreneurs.

== College and law school ==
Messer earned a Bachelor of Arts degree in history from Brown University, where she graduated Phi Beta Kappa and magna cum laude. She received her Juris Doctor from Harvard Law School, graduating cum laude.

== Career ==
=== Early career ===
Throughout high school and college, Messer worked for her family's real estate and maintenance business. After graduating from Harvard, Messer worked as an attorney at Baker & Botts, LLP.

=== LinkShare Corporation ===
In 1996, Messer and her brother, Stephen Messer, created LinkShare, an online distribution network that allowed websites to monetize their traffic through performance based links. Messer served as president and COO of LinkShare until its sale in 2005, to Rakuten Inc. for $425 million. In 2006, Messer left the company.

=== Collective[i] ===
In 2008, Messer co-founded Cross Commerce Media with her husband and brother. As of 2014, Messer serves as the chair of the company's board of directors. In 2014, Messer was granted two patents in conjunction with Collective[i]'s data analytics network.

=== Angel investing, board affiliations, and community involvement ===
Messer is co-founder and CEO of World Evolved, a platform for global investment and expansion. She is also a founding member of the Zokei Network, an invitation-only network of artists, scientists, and business leaders who meet in private salons around the world. Messer is also an angel investor in numerous startups including Spire, Lifebooker, and DoDo Case.

Messer serves on the Brown Women's Leadership Counsel and advisory boards for Netplenish, the Brown Entrepreneurship Program, the Department of Physics and Astronomy at Johns Hopkins, Dell Computers, NBC Universal, and American Express OPEN. Messer also serves on the board of the Partnership for New York City and has been a judge and mentor in the NYC Venture Fellows Program.

== Speaking engagements and press ==
Messer is a frequent speaker at universities and conferences around the world on entrepreneurship, digital marketing and advertising, business intelligence, and the future of the internet. Messer has presented at Baruch College, Columbia Business School, and Fordham University. She has been cited in various publications including, The Wall Street Journal, The New York Times, USA Today, Inc. Magazine, Forbes, The Nikkei, Bloomberg Businessweek, Women's Wear Daily, Chief Executive Magazine, and Wired.

Messer is also known as the host of an exclusive all female Poker game, featured in Vogue as a new model for combining networking, idea sharing, and charitable giving similar to the intellectual salons of the past. Additionally, Messer has appeared on national television and radio programs including the Today Show, Rock Center, Business Talk Radio, Fox News, CBS Morning News, and the Fox Morning Show.

Messer and her brother Stephen were featured in the Startup Playbook by David Kidder along with Elon Musk, Tony Hsieh, Steve Case, Jay S. Walker, Reid Hoffman, and Sara Blakely. She has also been cited in An Incredible Dream: Ralph Roberts and the Story of Comcast by William Novak and Stiletto Network by Pamela Ryckman.

In 2011, Messer organized an art exhibit held at the Charles Bank Gallery in New York City. The show, entitled Celestial Matters, featured works of art that had only previously been displayed in an exhibition hosted during a private mission on the International Space Station. The reception for these works benefited the Challenger Center for Space Science Exploration and featured the astronaut Buzz Aldrin.

Messer served on the 2012 Wall Street Journal Executive Task Force on Women and participated in the 2014 Wall Street Journal CIO Network as a subject matter expert.

In 2013, Messer was selected to serve as a member of Comptroller Scott Stringer's Transition Committee.

== Awards and honors ==
In 2012, Messer was selected as one of the 100 Most Intriguing Entrepreneurs by Goldman Sachs as part of their Builders and Innovators Summit. Additionally, Messer was named one of the 2012 Power Players in New York City by AlwaysOn.

Under Messer's leadership, LinkShare was recognized by Deloitte & Touche in 2002 and 2003 as the fastest growing technology company in the New York Region. In 2002, LinkShare was also named the Best Affiliate Network Provider by ABestWeb.

In both 2012 and 2013, Messer's current venture, Collective[i], was selected as one of OnMedia's 100 Top Private Companies.

In 2015, Collective[i] was named an OnCloud Top 100 private company under the 'Software-as-a-service solution for big data analytics' category.
