= The Daily Dot =

American digital media company covering internet culture

- Screenshot
- Website type: News
- Available in: English
- Creator: Nicholas White
- Editor: Whitney Jefferson
- Website: dailydot.com
- Commercial: Yes
- Launched: August 23, 2011; 15 years ago

The Daily Dot is a digital media company covering the culture of the Internet and the World Wide Web. It was founded by Nicholas White in 2011 and is headquartered in Austin, Texas.

The site, conceived as the Internet's "hometown newspaper", focuses on such topics as streaming entertainment, geek culture, memes, gadgets, and social issues such as LGBT, gender, and race. In addition, an e-commerce arm produces branded video for advertisers and sells items through an online marketplace.

== History ==
In establishinged The Daily Dot in 2011, Nicholas White's goal was to cover Internet communities such as Reddit and Tumblr in the same manner as hometown newspapers cover their own communities. White's family has been in the newspaper business since buying the Sandusky Register in Ohio in 1869, and White was a reporter and executive with the family's media company before establishing the site.

White launched The Daily Dot with $600,000 and a handful of full-time reporters. Many of the site's early stories were filed to a Google Doc and reported on Facebook and Twitter. After establishing a headquarters in Austin, Texas, the company added other offices, but many staff worked remotely from other locations. It raised a $10-million private investment to add staff, produce digital content, and develop its internal creative agency in 2015, ramping up its output to 50–70 stories a day. Its coverage has focused on "under-reported" areas while emphasizing progressive issues such as body positivity and feminism. White has also highlighted the need to diversify his staff. "Journalism has been dominated by a few select types of voices. We have an opportunity to break from that cycle," he said.

The Daily Dot has pursued several content strategies while building its online presence. In 2012, it was one of the first major sites to launch dedicated esports coverage. In 2016, the company sold that section, Dot Esports, to Gamurs, an Australian esports multimedia operation.

In 2014, it purchased The Kernel, a competing website, and turned it into a weekly Sunday edition featuring long-form editorial built around a single theme. The Kernel founder and editor in chief Milo Yiannopoulos stepped down following the acquisition. The Kernel ceased regular publication in 2016.

The Daily Dot has collaborated on video projects with such partners as HLN, on a co-branded series called Next Sex; the U.S. Department of Health and Human Services, for which it produced a public service announcement encouraging vaccination and featuring Sesame Street character Elmo and former Surgeon General Vivek Murthy; and television cooking personality Alton Brown, whose review of kitchen gadgets garnered many millions of views on YouTube.

In January 2016, the site launched VIP Voices, a collection of op-eds from high-profile contributors on Internet issues in public discourse. Contributors have included Mayor Bill de Blasio, Representative Ted Lieu, and Senator Mike Lee.

In 2018, The Daily Dot sued the New York Police Department to access handgun license applications filed by President Donald Trump and two of his sons--Donald Trump Jr. and Eric Trump. The suit alleges that the NYPD declined a request made by The Daily Dot under New York's Freedom of Information Law to release the information, citing privacy and safety concerns; the site argues the information should be public.

The company had a full-time staff of 76 in addition to 222 freelance contributors in early 2016 before laying off 40% of its total staff in September 2016. White, who called the layoff a "restructuring", said the move was necessary to refocus resources on growing areas such as video, e-commerce, and sales. The site's e-commerce videos, produced in conjunction with advertisers, are viewable on Facebook and generate revenue by sharing a portion of sales. In addition, the site has built two online storefronts--the Bazaar and The Daily Dot Store--on which it sells items.

A Daily Dot newsletter, Passionfruit, began in August 2021 and spun out into its own website.

== Awards ==
- 2015 honoree, The Webby Awards, Websites-News.
- 2015 finalist, Digiday Publisher of the Year, for its investigation of a data breach at global intelligence firm Stratfor.
- 2015 cited among works of outstanding journalism by The Atlantic for "How to Destroy an American Family", which chronicled the toll of continued cyberattacks on an Illinois family.
- 2016 finalist, Digiday Publisher of the Year and Best Native Advertising.
- 2016 finalist, The Webby Awards, Best Individual Performance in Online Film and Video (for Alton Brown collaboration).
- 2017, finalist, CJ Affiliate CJ You Innovator of the Year Award.
