= Shareasale =

American affiliate marketing network

ShareASale
- Type: Private
- Industry: Affiliate marketing
- Founded: Chicago, Illinois (2000)
- Headquarters: Chicago, Illinois,
- Products: Affiliate network
- Website: ShareASale.com

ShareASale was an affiliate marketing network based in the River North neighborhood in Chicago, IL USA. ShareASale serviced two customer sets in affiliate marketing: the affiliate, and the merchant.

Affiliates used ShareASale to find products to promote, and earn commission for referrals on those products. Affiliates used their own website, blogs, social media, PPC campaigns, SEO campaigns, RSS and email, as well as a number of other means.

Merchants used ShareASale to implement, track, and manage their affiliate program.

== History ==
ShareASale was founded in 2000 by Brian Littleton, and to date had over 16550 merchant programs hosted on its network platform. ShareASale was primarily targeting small and mid-size merchants. ShareASale was among the largest U.S. affiliate networks in terms of number of advertisers who were using an affiliate network to manage their affiliate program.

After many years with the company Brian and Michael Littleton left in 2018.

On October 6, 2025 Awin shut down ShareASale.

== Ownership ==
ShareASale was a privately held Chicago, Illinois; USA Corporation when it was founded in 2000.

ShareASale was acquired by Awin, which is part of Axel Springer Group, on June 10, 2017, for an undisclosed amount.

== See also ==
- Affiliate Networks
- Affiliate marketing
