= Bill Tobin =

Bill or William Tobin may refer to:

- Bill Tobin (baseball) (1854–1912), baseball player
- Bill Tobin (American football) (1941–2024), American football player
- Bill Tobin (ice hockey) (1895–1963), Canadian ice hockey player, executive and head coach
- William Tobin (journalist) (1927–2009), American journalist
- William Tobin (cricketer) (1859–1904), Australian cricketer
- William Tobin (astronomer) (1953–2022), British–New Zealand astronomer and academic
- William J. Tobin, American entrepreneur and inventor
- Liam Tobin (1895–1963), Irish intelligence officer and mutineer
