= Data feed =

Mechanism for users to receive updated data from data sources

Data feed is a mechanism for users to receive updated data from data sources. It is commonly used by real-time applications in point-to-point settings as well as on the World Wide Web. The latter is also called web feed. News feed is a popular form of web feed. RSS feed makes dissemination of blogs easy. Product feeds play increasingly important role in e-commerce and internet marketing, as well as news distribution, international markets, and cybersecurity. Data feeds usually require structured data that include different labelled fields, such as "title" or "product".

== Data feed formats ==
- RSS 1.0, 2.0
- Atom feed
- RDF feed
- Comma-separated values (CSV)
- JSON
- XML

== Emerging semantic data feed ==
The Web is evolving into a web of data or Semantic Web. Data will be encoded by Semantic Web languages like RDF or OWL according to many experts' visions. So, it is not difficult to envision data feeds will be also in the form of RDF or OWL. A big advantage of providing semantic data feeds, i.e. feeding data in Semantic Web standards, is that the data can then be readily consumed and reused by other computers.

== CSV data feed and affiliate marketing ==
CSV (Comma-separated values) data feeds are mostly being used within affiliate marketing. Affiliate or so called publisher websites use the CSV file to load product information from online stores. This way it is a lot easier to load thousands of products to the website. CSV is not structured like a document, as XML is, but it has a good layout for integration. Like XML, CSV format and semantics can be declared using validation languages.

Most of these delimited file formats can easily be created and loaded with any spreadsheet program like Excel.

== See also ==
- Semantic publishing
