= Testimonial =

Statement extolling the virtue of a product or person

An advertisement for the Wikimedia Foundation incorporating a series of editor testimonials

In promotion and advertising, a testimonial or show consists of a person's written or spoken statement extolling the virtue of a product. The term "testimonial" most commonly applies to the sales-pitches attributed to ordinary citizens, whereas the word "endorsement" usually applies to pitches by celebrities. Testimonials can be part of communal marketing.

== Celebrity endorsements ==
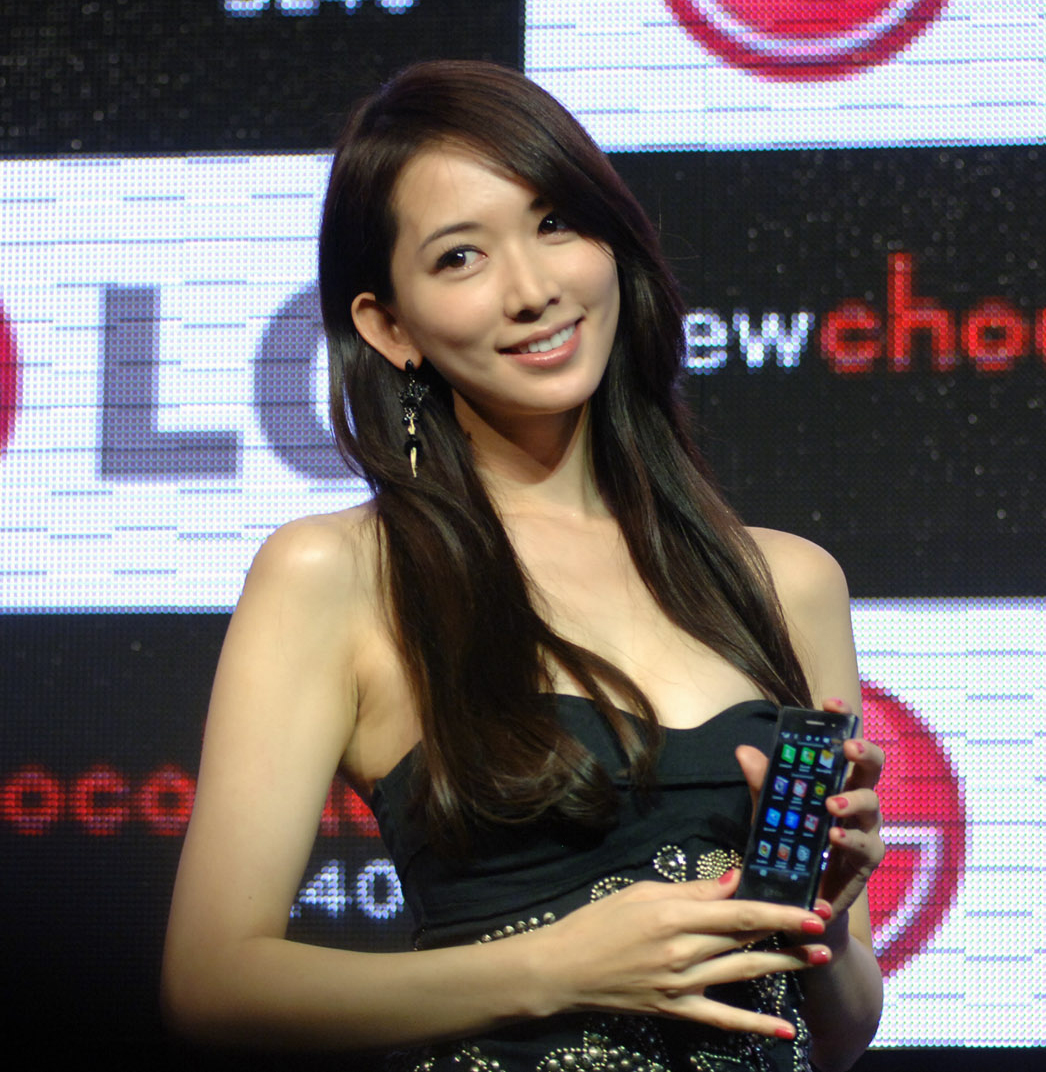
Actress and model Lin Chi-ling at the LG New Chocolate (BL40) phone launching event in 2009, Hong Kong

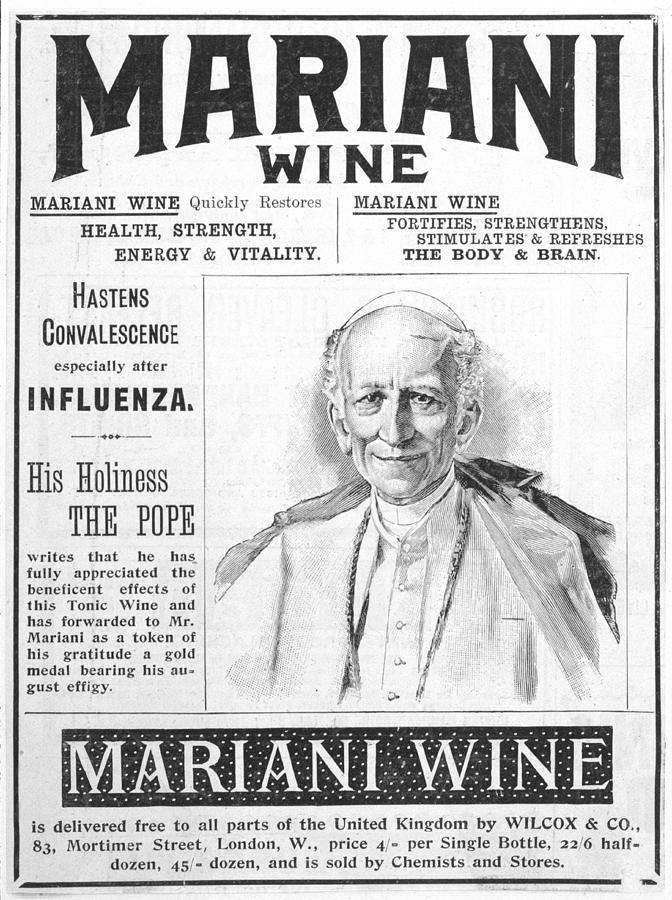
Pope Leo XIII endorses "Vin Mariani", a patent medicine containing cocaine

Advertisers have attempted to quantify and qualify the use of celebrities in their marketing campaigns by evaluating the awareness generated, appeal, and relevance to a brand's image and the celebrity's influence on consumer buying behavior.

Social media such as Twitter have become increasingly popular mediums for celebrities to endorse brands and to attempt to influence purchasing behavior. According to a study by Zenith, social media ad spending was $29 billion in 2016 and is expected to rise to $50 billion in 2019. Advertising and marketing companies sponsor celebrities to tweet and influence thousands (sometimes millions) of their followers to buy brand products. For example, Ryan Seacrest (an American broadcaster) gets paid to promote Ford products. Companies that pay celebrities to tweet for them subscribe to the Canadian writer Malcolm Gladwell's theory of influence.

Celebrity endorsements have proven very successful in China, where increasing consumerism makes the purchase of an endorsed product into a status symbol. On August 1st, 2007, laws were passed banning healthcare professionals and public figures such as movie stars or pop singers from appearing in advertisements for drugs or nutritional supplements. A spokesperson stated, "A celebrity appearing in drug advertising is more likely to mislead consumers, therefore, the state must consider controlling medical advertisements and strengthen the management of national celebrities appearing in medical advertisements."

== Customer ==
Testimonials from customers who are not famous have been effectively used in marketing for as long as marketing has existed. A past or current customer will present a formal "word of mouth" testimonial that a business can use in marketing and to build trust with future customers. Testimonials are incredibly effective when believed to be true, but a challenge is having the audience believe that testimonials presented by a business are given by real people, not fabricated by the business itself. Even so, testimonials, reviews, and case studies are still considered by most marketing experts to be the most effective means of marketing and gaining brand trust by small- and medium-sized businesses.

Testimonials, in the form of online reviews, have become a part of daily life for most Internet users. Websites such as Yelp!, Google Maps, and TripAdvisor have become 'go to' places for individuals who are seeking customer testimonials about a particular business or product. Testimonials for products, sellers and services, in the form of written reviews and star-based rating systems, are often displayed on E-commerce platforms such as Amazon, eBay, Airbnb, and Uber.

Instagram especially has increasingly been useful in distributing testimonials on products and places. It is done by making use of the tagging feature that directly links to the original brand or the particular location that the picture was taken. Moreover, the description of the pictures are also used to write either the review or sentences that complements the product or place. Users with a large number of followers are commonly targeted for endorsement deal requests that aims to create these testimonial posts, where in return, the user receives commission for 'advertising' the place or product. However, it can only be called an endorsement deal when the company or label contacts the user directly to create such testimonial post, and the user receives commission. This is becoming a trend in Indonesia, especially amongst users with at least one thousand followers, where some are now known for posting pictures with advertising purposes.

The downside to such explosive importance in this arena is the massive amount of fraud in the form of fake reviews or opinion spam, testimonials that are not authentic. Often, a business owner will open multiple email addresses and then corresponding Yelp! accounts and write a multitude of testimonials seemingly by many customers of said business. Similarly, the same owner may also write negative reviews of competitors. From a New York Times article about the same topic, "On another forum, Digital Point, a poster wrote, 'I will pay for positive feedback on TripAdvisor.' A Craigslist post proposed this: 'If you have an active Yelp account and would like to make very easy money please respond.' There are tens-of-thousands of ads out there all over the internet of people requesting you to write bogus reviews for their business and people offering to do the same.". However, there are legitimate and legal ways for business owners to build their portfolio of reviews such as mentioning to customers that they value honest feedback and then providing them with the appropriate instructions for where they can review the business.

There have also been allegations that review sites themselves are prepared to manipulate reviews in return for companies buying advertising subscriptions, with a class action being filed against Yelp to this effect in February 2010.

== Research ==
Research by Martin, Wentzel and Tomczak (2008) found that the effectiveness of testimonials depends on the degree to which consumers are influenced by normative pressure and the quality of the product features highlighted. Results showed that people influenced by peer pressure place a greater emphasis on the testimonial than on the attribute information. In contrast, people who ignore the opinions of others are more influenced by attribute information.

== Legality ==
The Federal Trade Commission (FTC) found that in US businesses, an alarming number of testimonials were in fact fictitious and misleading. In December 2009, they introduced a new set of rules governing testimonials. In essence, it is now illegal to use testimonials that "...mislead consumers and affect consumers' behavior or decisions about the product or service." However, despite new regulations, online consumers often view testimonials with a high degree of skepticism. Companies from the private sector have begun to offer testimonial verification services to help consumers verify the authenticity of displayed testimonials.
