= Shawn Hogan =

American businessman (born 1975)

Shawn D. Hogan (born September 1, 1975) is the founder and chief executive officer of Digital Point Solutions, a San Diego–based business software provider. He became well known when the article "Shawn Hogan, Hero" appeared in the August 2006 edition of the magazine Wired, detailing his firm stand against a Motion Picture Association of America (MPAA) lawsuit.

Accused of downloading the motion picture, Meet the Fockers, via the BitTorrent network, he received a call in November 2005 from an MPAA lawyer explaining that he was being sued, and that the MPAA would settle for $2,500.

Hogan maintains his innocence, pointing out that he owns a legitimate copy of the DVD. The case is unusual in that Hogan, as a millionaire, has been willing to risk the substantial legal fees on this point of principle. As he told Wired magazine, "They're completely abusing the system... I would spend well into the millions on this."

However, in August 2007, Hogan quietly settled with Universal, and S.D. Cal. case no. CV 06-00545 was dismissed.

In August 2008, eBay filed suit against Hogan, Brian Dunning and his brother Todd Dunning accusing them of defrauding eBay and eBay affiliates in a cookie stuffing scheme. Hogan was paid over $28 million in affiliate commissions by eBay. On 24 June 2010, based on the same allegations and following an investigation by the Federal Bureau of Investigation (FBI), a grand jury indicted Hogan on charges of wire fraud and criminal forfeiture. Hogan was free on a $100,000 bond. On May 2, 2014, Hogan was sentenced to five months in prison, a $25,000 fine and three years probation.
