= Nadine Strossen =

American lawyer and former president of the ACLU

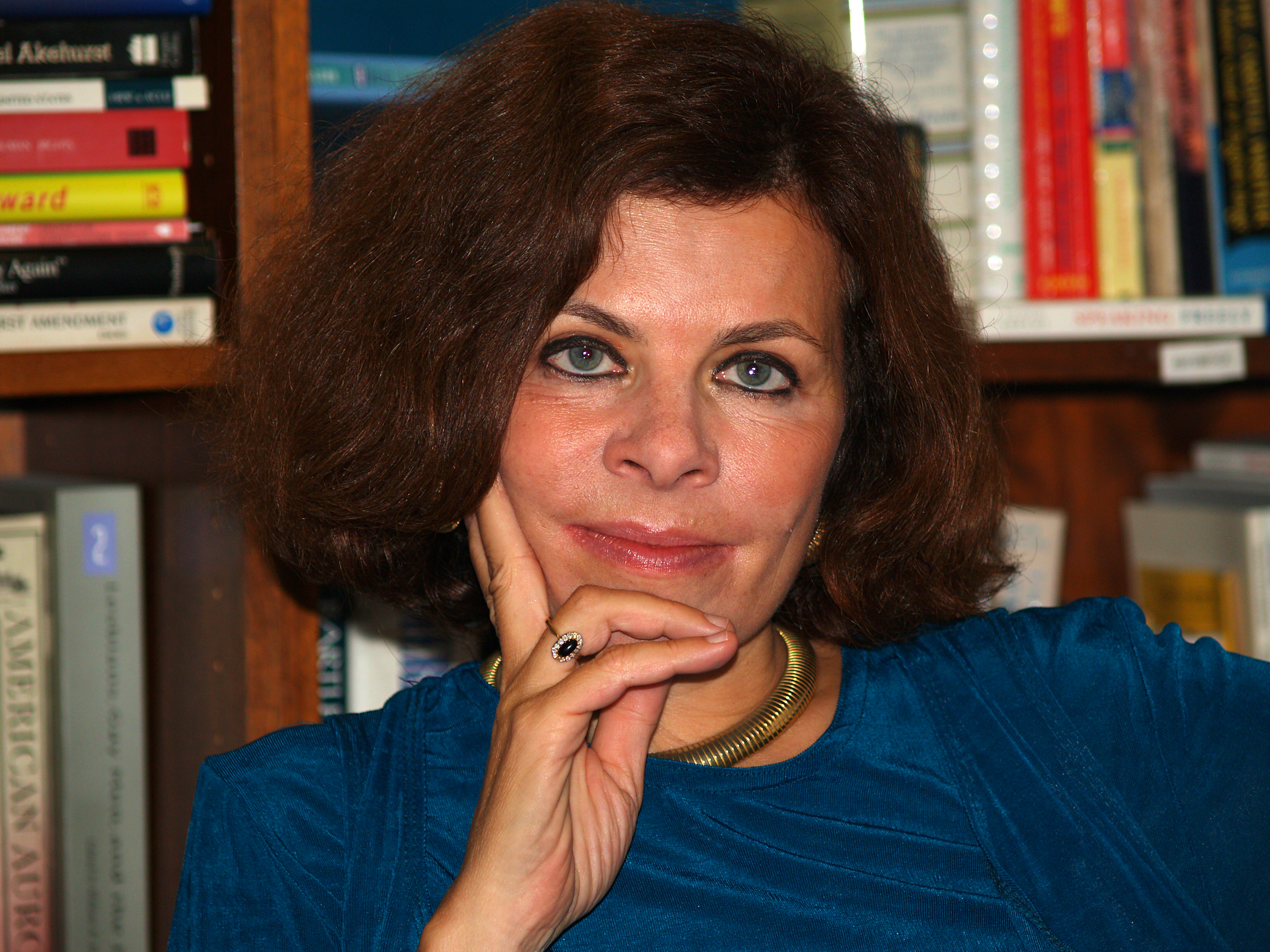

President of the American Civil Liberties Union
- In office February 1991 – October 18, 2008
- Preceded by: Norman Dorsen
- Succeeded by: Susan Herman

Personal details
- Born: August 18, 1950 (age 76) Jersey City, New Jersey, U.S.
- Spouse: Eli Noam (m. 1980)
- Education: Radcliffe College (BA); Harvard University (JD)
- Strossen's voice On the complexities of free speech

Nadine Strossen (born August 18, 1950) is an American legal scholar and civil liberties activist who served as the president of the American Civil Liberties Union (ACLU) from 1991 to 2008. A liberal feminist, she was the first woman to lead the ACLU. A professor at New York Law School, Strossen is a member of the Council on Foreign Relations and other professional organizations.

== Early life and education ==
Strossen was born in Jersey City, New Jersey, on August 18, 1950. Her maternal grandfather was an immigrant to the United States from Yugoslavia and was a conscientious objector during World War I, causing him to be publicly humiliated at the courthouse in Hudson County. Strossen's father, Woodrow J. Strossen, was born in Germany, where he was labeled as a half-Jew and spoke against Nazism. He was removed from school and placed in the Buchenwald concentration camp until being liberated by American troops. Strossen's mother, a member of the National Organization for Women and supporter of Planned Parenthood, was an advocate for women's rights.

When she was eight years old, Strossen's family moved to Hopkins, Minnesota. As a child, she frequented the local public library. She initially considered pursuing a career as a teacher; while attending high school in Hopkins, Strossen distinguished herself as a member of the school's debate team, of which she was the only girl. In 1968, Strossen enrolled at Radcliffe College, where she was a resident of Holmes Hall (now a part of Pforzheimer House) before moving to Winthrop House in 1970. She met her husband, Eli Noam, while they were both at Harvard when he was a tutor in Adams House.

In addition to her involvement in debate, Strossen became interested in feminism as an undergraduate student. She subscribed to a political philosophy of civil libertarianism, later recalling that "the rallying cries were reproductive freedom and the anti-war movement". She graduated in 1972 with a Bachelor of Arts (B.A.) in history and literature as a National Merit Scholar along with membership in Phi Beta Kappa. Strossen then attended Harvard Law School, becoming an editor of the Harvard Law Review, and obtaining her Juris Doctor (J.D.), magna cum laude, in 1975. After graduating, she was a law clerk for a year at the Minnesota Supreme Court.

== Career ==
Strossen was an attorney in private practice, first in Minneapolis, Minnesota, from 1976 to 1978, then in New York City at Sullivan & Cromwell from 1978 to 1984. She left practicing to begin teaching as an associate professor of clinical law at the New York Law School from 1984 until 1988. Strossen specialized in constitutional law, federal courts, and human rights.

In 1983, Strossen joined the national board of directors of the American Civil Liberties Union (ACLU), then its national executive committee in 1985. From 1986 to 1991, she served as the organization's general counsel. In the spring of 1990, ACLU president Norman Dorsen announced that he would be stepping down, and Strossen emerged as one of four candidates to assume the position, winning on the second ballot.

=== President of the ACLU ===
In 1991, Strossen became the first female president of the American Civil Liberties Union. She was the sixth person to have served in the position. As president, Strossen made over 200 public presentations. In May 2008, she announced her resignation. On October 18, 2008, the ACLU selected Susan Herman, a constitutional law professor at Brooklyn Law School in New York, to replace her.

== Other activities ==
She appeared in the 2000 docudrama Dirty Pictures. In October 2001, Strossen made her theater debut as the guest star in Eve Ensler's play, The Vagina Monologues at the National Theatre in Washington, D.C.

In 2004, Strossen received the Religious Liberty Award from the American Humanist Association.

Having been appointed as the chaired John Marshall Harlan II Professor of Law in 2015, she teaches constitutional law and human rights.

In 2019, her book Hate: Why We Should Resist It with Free Speech, Not Censorship was chosen as the Washington University in St. Louis Common Reading book. On August 26, Strossen delivered a keynote address at the university. On April 12, 2021, in "shaping Opinion", Strossen and host Tim O'Brien discussed her opinions and possible solutions on countering harmful or "hate speech" other than censoring it, as she sets out in her book.

Strossen spoke at the inaugural gala for the Foundation for Individual Rights and Expression in New York City in April 2023.

- Academic Freedom Alliance (AFA), founding member
- University of Austin (UATX), founding member

== Personal life ==
Strossen is married to Eli Noam, a professor at Columbia Business School. They married in 1980. When she grew up, Strossen's mother prevented her from playing with dolls, an experience which she later suggested to have contributed in her choice not to have children.

== Select publications ==
- 1995: Defending Pornography: Free Speech, Sex and the Fight for Women's Rights (ISBN 0-8147-8149-7)
- 1996: Speaking of Race, Speaking of Sex: Hate Speech, Civil Rights, and Civil Liberties (ISBN 0-8147-3090-6)
- 2018: Hate: Why We Should Resist It with Free Speech, Not Censorship (ISBN 0-1908-5912-1)
