= Product feed =

A product feed or product data feed is a file made up of a list of products and attributes of those products organized so that each product can be displayed, advertised or compared in a unique way. A product feed typically contains a product image, title, product identifier, marketing copy, and product attributes. But, can also contain links to rich media assets such as videos, 3D animations, brochures, product stories, product relations, and reviews, as in the case of Open Icecat, the multilingual open content catalogue.

Product feeds supply the content that is presented on many kinds of e-commerce websites such as webshops, search engines, price comparison websites, affiliate networks, and other similar aggregators of e-commerce information. Product data feeds are generated by manufacturers, online retailers and, in some cases, product information is extracted using web scraping or harvested web harvesting from the online shops website.

== Applications ==
While product feeds differ in content and structure, the goal remains the same – deliver high-quality (fresh, relevant, accurate, comprehensive) information so that shoppers can make a buying decision.

Product data feeds are often delivered between manufacturers, distributors and retailers, and are also used within a variety of online marketing channels that help shoppers locate and understand the product they wish to purchase and drive the traffic to the retailers' website. These marketing channels include:

1. Price comparison websites – Feeds are the product descriptive content needed to run sites that compare pricing (price comparison websites), attributes (mostly in vertical search portals) and availability.
2. Paid search affiliates – PPC campaigns use API's that receive a range of attributes within product feeds to determine campaign keywords and bidding.
3. Affiliate networks – affiliate networks funnel products though their platforms from merchants to affiliates.
4. Marketplaces – receive product feeds from their merchants (eBay and Amazon for example).
5. Social Networks - can accept product feeds from merchants to list products (Facebook, Instagram, Pinterest for example).

== Feed formats ==
- After announcing the importance of quality product data feeds, Google has updated its feed requirements.
- Other product listing sites use proprietary formats that are either plain text or XML format.
- Emerging RDF format: Semantic web standards such as RDF are taking root. It is expected product feed will soon adopt this new web standard.
