= Brian Dunning (author) =

American writer, producer and podcaster (born 1965)

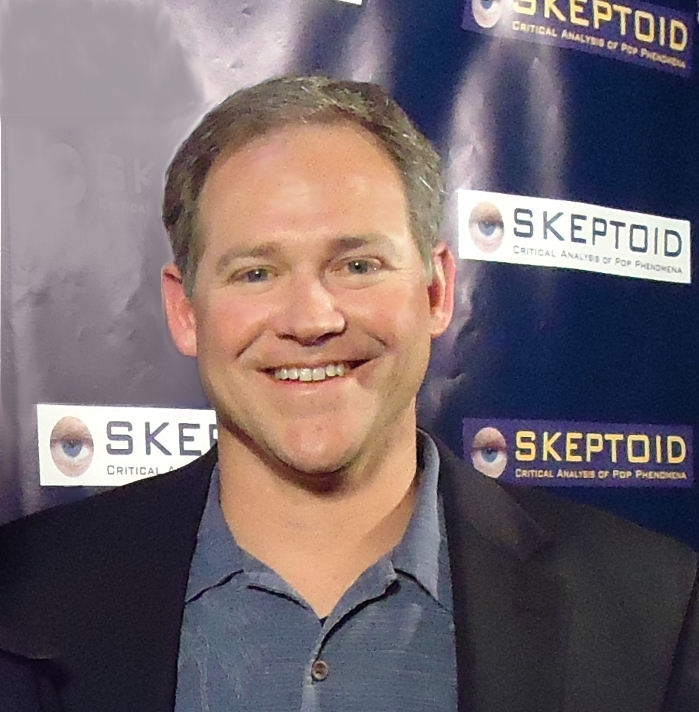
- Dunning at the Skeptoid 250th episode party at UC Irvine, California, 2011
- Born: 1965 (age 60–61)
- Occupations: Writer, producer, author
- Criminal charges: Wire fraud
- Brian Dunning's voice recorded March 2, 2014
- Website: skeptoid.com

Brian Andrew Dunning (born 1965) is an American writer and producer who focuses on science and skepticism. He has hosted a weekly podcast, Skeptoid, since 2006, and he is an author of a series of books on the subject of scientific skepticism, some of which are based on the podcast. Skeptoid has been the recipient of several podcast awards such as the Parsec Award. Dunning has also created the Skeptoid.org spin-off video series, inFact, and The Feeding Tube both available on YouTube.

Dunning has produced two educational films on the subject of critical thinking: Here Be Dragons in 2008, and Principles of Curiosity in 2017.

Dunning co-founded Buylink, a business-to-business service provider, in 1996, and served at the company until 2002. He later became eBay's second-biggest affiliate marketer; he has since been convicted of wire fraud through a cookie stuffing scheme, for his company fraudulently obtaining between $200,000 and $400,000 from eBay. In August 2014, he was sentenced to 15 months in prison, followed by three years of supervision.

== Career ==
=== Buylink ===
In 1996 Dunning co-founded and was chief technology officer for Buylink Corporation. Buylink received venture capital funding from Hummer Winblad Venture Partners. In 2000 he participated in a presentation on Buylink at The Berkeley Entrepreneurs Forum called Bricks to Clicks in the New Internet Reality. He discussed the company on CNNfn's Market Call, in Rhonda Schaffler's Maverick of the Morning segment. In 2002, Dunning left his position as CTO of BuyLink.

Between 1997 and 2005 he was technical editor for FileMaker Advisor magazine, and contributing editor of ISO FileMaker Magazine, 1996–2002, winning one of the FileMaker Excellence Awards at the 2001 FileMaker Developers Conference.

=== Skeptical activism ===
Beginning in 2006, Dunning hosted and produced Skeptoid, a weekly audio podcast dedicated "to furthering knowledge by blasting away the widespread pseudosciences that infect popular culture, and replacing them with way cooler reality". He is also the author of the book of the same title and a sequel.

Beginning in 2007, Dunning periodically released video episodes of his InFact series. Each episode is under four minutes long and covers issues similar to those explored in more depth in the Skeptoid podcast, but is intended to reach a wider audience due to its brevity and availability on YouTube.

In 2008 Dunning produced Here Be Dragons, a free 40-minute video introduction to critical thinking intended for general audiences, and received an award from the Portland Humanist Film Festival for this in November 2011.

In 2010 Dunning was awarded the Parsec Award for "Best Fact Behind the Fiction Podcast". In August 2010 he received an award recognizing his contributions in the skeptical field from the Independent Investigations Group (IIG) during its 10th Anniversary Gala.

In June 2017 Dunning's second film, Principles of Curiosity, was released. According to Dunning, this "presents a general introduction to the foundations of scientific skepticism and critical thinking... It is nonprofit, noncommercial, and licensed for free public, and private screenings. It is provided with free educational materials for teachers, designed for high school through college. It is suitable for all audiences. Its 40-minute runtime should fit into most classes."

In October 2019, a special preview of the Skeptoid Media documentary, Science Friction, was shown after CSICon in Las Vegas. Through a series of interviews, the film addresses the issue of scientists and skeptics being misrepresented by the media. Produced by Dunning and directed by filmmaker and comedian Emery Emery, it was released in 2022.

Dunning has written articles for Skepticblog.org, published by The Skeptics Society, and was an executive producer for the unreleased network television pilot The Skeptologists. He is a member of the National Association of Science Writers, and is the "Chancellor" of the non-accredited "Thunderwood College", a parody of unaccredited institutions of higher learning which offer "degrees" in a variety of subjects.

=== Wire fraud case ===
In August 2008, eBay filed suit against Dunning, accusing him of defrauding eBay and eBay affiliates in a cookie stuffing scheme for his company, Kessler's Flying Circus. In June 2010, based on the same allegations and following an investigation by the Federal Bureau of Investigation, a grand jury indicted Dunning on charges of wire fraud. On April 15, 2013, in the San Jose, California, U.S. District Court, as part of a plea agreement, Dunning pleaded guilty to wire fraud. The eBay civil suit was dismissed in May 2014 after the parties came to an agreement, while Dunning was sentenced in August 2014 to fifteen months in prison as a result of his company receiving between $200,000 and $400,000 in fraudulent commissions from eBay. In a statement on his website, Dunning explained the circumstances, and initially accepted responsibility for his actions, although in a later account claimed to have been in the right and to have only pled guilty in order to protect his family and to avoid a longer jail term.

== Skeptoid podcasts ==
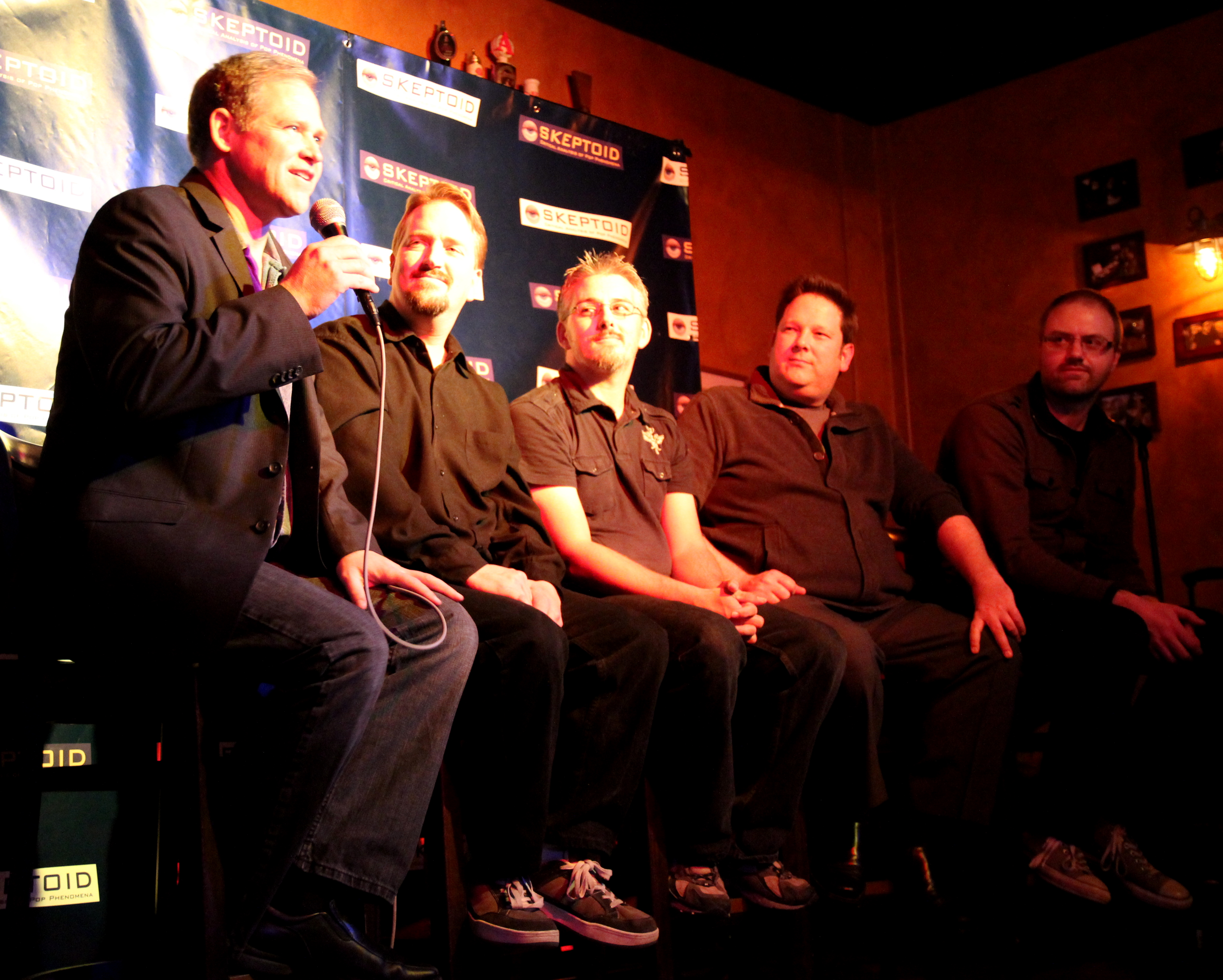
Skeptoid 300th episode party: Brian Dunning, Ryan Johnson, Jesse Horn, Lee Sanders and Bill Simpkins in Q&A discussing the debut of The Secret of the Gypsy Queen

Skeptoid is Dunning's weekly podcast. The show follows an audio essay format, and is dedicated to the critical examination of pseudoscience and the paranormal. In May 2012, Skeptoid Media became a 501(c)(3) educational nonprofit.

Along with similarly themed Point of Inquiry, Skepticality: The Official Podcast of Skeptic Magazine, and The Skeptics' Guide to the Universe, it is listed on an iTunes (US) web page of popular science and medicine podcasts. In May 2014, Skeptoid's website reported that the podcast had a weekly average of 161,000 downloads.

Each roughly ten-minute Skeptoid episode focuses on a single issue that is generally pseudoscientific in nature. Transcriptions of the episodes are available on line, and usually fall into one of four categories:

- Quackery medical modalities: such as homeopathy, reflexology, detoxification, or chiropractic
- Popular cultural misconceptions: such as organic foods, SUVs, and global warming
- Urban legends: such as crop circles, the Amityville Horror, the Phoenix Lights, or the Philadelphia Experiment
- Religion and mythology: such as creation legends, New Age religions, and concepts of sin

Beginning in 2007, Dunning authored a series of books based upon the Skeptoid podcast episodes.

Despite his shift away from the technology industry, Dunning continues to do computer programming, and does web development for his Skeptoid website.

From 2022, the show is distributed by public media organization PRX's Dovetail publishing platform; PRX also provides sponsorship and promotional support.

== Publications ==
- Strapping Young Lads (1 ed.). Xlibris Corp. 2001. p. 272. ISBN 978-1-4010-1168-0.
- Strapping Young Lads (2 ed.). CreateSpace. 2014. p. 322. ISBN 978-1-5008-5407-2.
- Dunning, Brian; Knox, Allyson; Becker, Lori (2003). Special Edition: Using Adobe GoLive 6. Que. p. 650. ISBN 978-0-7897-2727-5. OCLC 48678473.
- Skeptoid: Critical Analysis of Pop Phenomena. CreateSpace. 2007. p. 213. ISBN 978-1-4348-2166-9. OCLC 287154998.
- Skeptoid 2: More Critical Analysis of Pop Phenomena. CreateSpace. 2008. p. 265. ISBN 978-1-4404-2285-0. OCLC 589083050.
- Skeptoid 3: Pirates, Pyramids, and Papyrus. CreateSpace. 2011. p. 314. ISBN 978-1-4538-8118-7.
- Skeptoid 4: Astronauts, Aliens, and Ape-Men. CreateSpace. 2012. p. 349. ISBN 978-1-4752-0565-7.
- Skeptoid 5: Massacres, Monsters, and Miracles. CreateSpace. 2013. p. 359. ISBN 978-1-4927-0906-0.
- The Secret of the Gypsy Queen (illustrated by Jesse Horn). CreateSpace. 2013. p. 32. ISBN 978-1-4776-2623-8.
- Conspiracies Declassified: The Skeptoid Guide to the Truth Behind the Theories. Adams Media. 2018. p. 256. ISBN 978-1-5072-0699-7.

== Filmography ==
=== Science Friction ===
Dunning was co-writer (with Emery Emery) of Science Friction, a documentary on how scientists are misrepresented in the media. It was released on Amazon Prime Video in 2022 and starred Matt Kirshen, Janine Krippner, Simon Singh, Banachek, Steven Novella, Michael Shermer, Richard Dawkins, Ben Radford, Zubin Damania, and Ken Feder amongst other scientists.

=== The UFO Movie THEY Don't Want You to See ===
In 2023 Dunning produced the documentary The UFO Movie THEY Don't Want You to See that explores the science behind UFOs. It was crowd-funded and is available as video-on demand and free, but ad-supported. The documentary was favorably reviewed in Psychology Today and the Skeptical Inquirer, and has been shown at the SETI Institute.

== Awards ==
In 2026, Dunning and Skeptoid Media received recognition and the annual James Randi Educational Foundation award ($125,000 USD) for promoting Skepticism and Critical thinkingto a worldwide audience.
