= Search marketing =

Search marketing is the process of acquiring traffic or customers via search engines such as Google, Bing, Yahoo and others. Search marketing generally involves two disciplines: SEO (search engine optimization) and SEM (search engine marketing). Originally called “search engine marketing,” the shorter phrase “search marketing” is now often used as the umbrella term over SEO and SEM. The longer phrase "search engine marketing" — or SEM — is now typically used to describe paid search activities.
