= William J. Tobin =

American businessman

- Born: New York City
- Education: Adelphi University
- Alma mater: C.W. Post College (MBA)
- Occupations: Entrepreneur, Author
- Writing career
- Notable awards: Entrepreneur of the Year; Inc. Magazine
- Website: www.williamjtobin.com

William J. Tobin is an American entrepreneur, inventor, and business owner known for founding ten different startups since 1968, and securing 15 different patents for products and software. Among the companies he founded and was CEO and director of marketing of are PC Flowers, Inc. from 1988, Instruments of Sweden, and Concept Industries, Inc. He was named an "Entrepreneur of the Year" by Inc. Magazine and in 2011 published the memoir and business tutorial Confessions of a Compulsive Entrepreneur and Inventor.

== Early life, education ==
William J. Tobin was raised in a City Assisted Housing Project in New York City. His father was a policeman. Tobin claims he started his first company at age 12, when he borrowed his mother's credit card and she bought him a hand edger and a gas lawn mower at Sears. He worked his landscaping business manually until age 16, when he bought a car and a trailer.

In 1959 he began attending the State University of New York, Farmingdale, where he stayed for two years earning an associate degree in Applied Sciences. By the time he graduated, his landscaping business had grown considerably in size, with 2 trucks and 12 workers. Tobin then joined the United States Army and afterwards attended Adelphi University to earn a BBA in business, graduating in 1966. He attended C.W. Post College for his MBA.

== Career ==
Starting in 1968, Tobin began founding, financing, and marketing a series of startup companies. In each case he served as CEO and director of marketing. Throughout his career Tobin secured fifteen patents, including U.S. Patent #6,141,666, US Patent #7,505,913, and Japanese Patent #4,021,941.

In 1969 Tobin co-founded Cal Industries, Inc., was financier and marketing director. The company provided promotional programs for over 50 companies of the Fortune 500, including Pepsi, Nabisco, General Foods, CPC International, Coca-Cola, and American Tobacco. The company also developed educational materials for multiple major publishers, such as the American Management Association, Harcourt Brace Jovanovich, Macmillan, and McGraw-Hill. It also developed sales training programs for American Can, A&P, AT&T, Chase Manhattan Bank, General Foods, and Johnson & Johnson. Tobin left the company in 1977.

Tobin founded and financed a second company in 1971, Travel Concepts, Inc. He was president and CEO for 14 years. The company developed the first travel kits to be distributed in First Class and Business Class cabins, and also provided in-flight educational games for children. The first class and business class travel kits and the educational game programs have been utilized by most major airlines for 25 years.

Tobin's third company, Concept Industries, Inc., was founded in 1975. While he was president and CEO, the company developed computer software training programs, which went on to be used by most major word-processing and photo-typsetting systems like Compugraphic, Olivetti, Philips USA, Radio Shack, Royal Typewriter, Savin, and Xerox. In 1977, Tobin founded and was CEO to Cal Pack Industries, Inc., which invented and sold patented plastic dispensers for disposable cups and napkins, eliminating the need for restaurants to use expensive metal dispensers. The dispensers are still in common use. Tobin remained CEO until 1985.

A year after Cal Pack Industries was founded, Tobin founded Software Concepts, Inc., where he was president and CEO for 8 years. The company developed software programs for computers, including a map downloading program for the CIA, and one of the first patented software programs in the United States for spelling verification. The latter program was used by most major word-processing and photo-typesetting systems, including Lanier, Philips, and Xerox, among many others. The patent he was issued in 1980 for the Spell-Checking program was one of the first software patents issued in the United States, Canada, and Europe.

From 1984 to 1989, Tobin headed his startup Concept Communication, Inc., which replaced the then 100 pound, $100,000 computers necessary for teleconferencing with a patented, $12,000 circuit board which doubled frame rate from 15 frames per second to 30 frames per second and was reduced in size to a circuit board that fit into any PC. He secured a patent for a codec for full-motion videoconferencing, first demonstrated at AT&T Bell Labs in 1986. Tobin was named Man of the Year by the International Teleconferencing Association for this achievement.

In 1988 Tobin founded PC Flowers, Inc., one of the first online electronic commerce services on the Prodigy Network. The company was the first financially successful interactive electronic commerce service in the United States. By 1991, the company had sales in excess of $6 million. The company linked FTD's 25,000 member florists to the Prodigy Network, becoming their most successful service.

Tobin founded Instruments of Sweden, Inc. in 1987, where he patented, produced, and marketed an instrument used for removing deer ticks. He remained with the company until 1994. Tobin founded PC Flowers and Gifts in 1994, and using patents he had developed, the company invented the ability to provide tracking, affiliate marketing, and customized "co-branded" flower and gift services for numerous large websites. The company had over 2,700 affiliate marketing partners by 1998, and was sold in May 2000 to Federated Department Stores. In 2000, Tobin founded Commerce Technology Licensing, LLC, a consulting firm on patent licensing, co-branding, and e-commerce.

In early 2011 Tobin published his first book, ''Confessions of a Compulsive Entrepreneur and Inventor: How I Secured Fifteen Patents, Started Ten Companies, and Became a Pioneer on the Internet, which is part memoir and part tutorial.

== Awards ==
Tobin was named "Entrepreneur of the Year" by Inc. Magazine. He was also named "Man of Year" by the International Teleconferencing Association, and was selected as one of the "Top 100 Marketing Executives" by Ad Age Magazine.

== Personal life ==
Tobin lives on Marco Island, Florida. He founded the Tobin Family Education and Health Foundation, and when not boating, is a frequent speaker and panelist for business startups, management, and the topic of entrepreneurial innovation. He has also worked for a range of causes that search for cures for veterans' illnesses.

== Publishing history ==
- Tobin, William J. (2011). Confessions of a Compulsive Entrepreneur and Inventor. Author House. ISBN 978-1-4520-7781-9.
