= CJ Affiliate =

Online advertising company

CJ (formerly CJ Affiliate and Commission Junction)
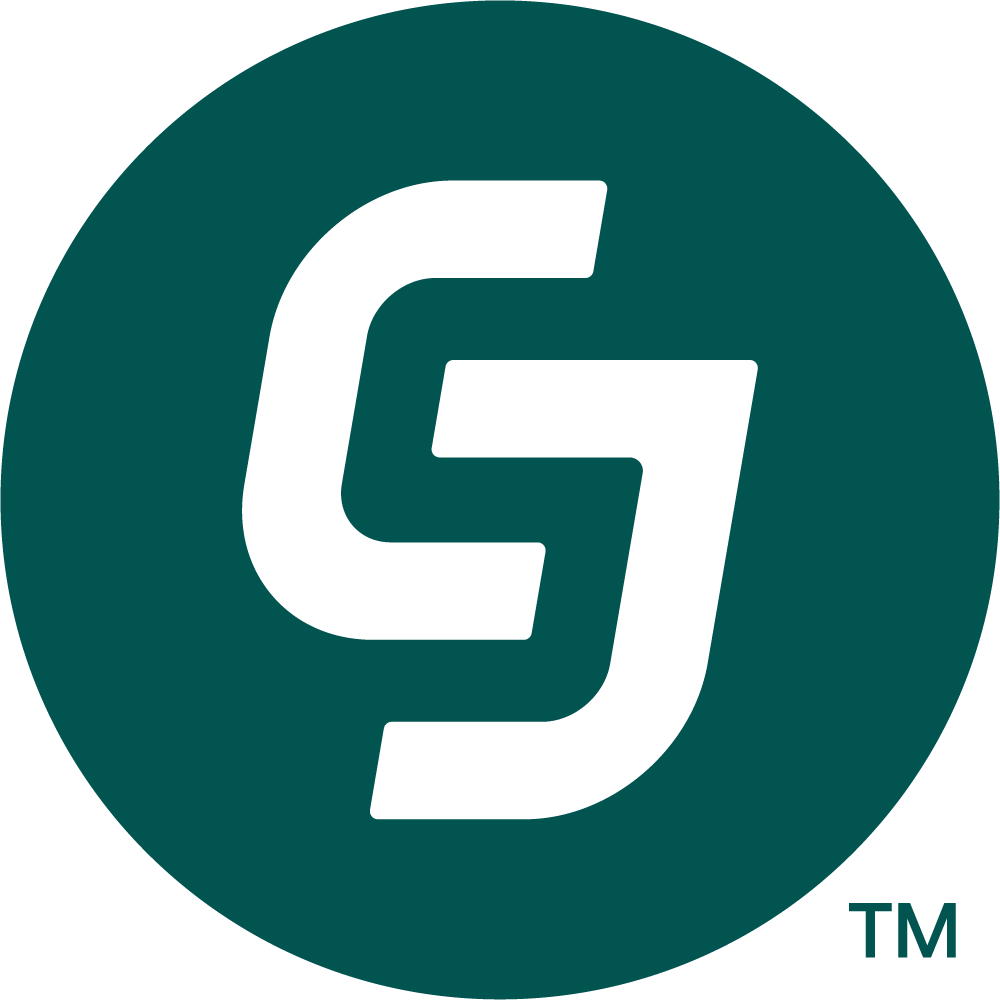
- Type: Subsidiary
- Industry: Affiliate marketing Performance-Based Marketing
- Founded: 1998; 28 years ago
- Headquarters: Santa Barbara, California
- Key people: Santi Pierini, (CEO)
- Parent: Publicis
- Website: cj.com

CJ (formerly CJ Affiliate and Commission Junction) is an online advertising company owned by Publicis Groupe operating in the affiliate marketing industry, which operates worldwide.

== Offices ==
The corporate headquarters is in Santa Barbara, California, and there are offices in Atlanta, GA, Chicago, IL, New York, NY, Los Angeles, CA, Agoura Hills, CA, and Needham, MA in the US, and in the UK, Germany, France, Spain, Sweden, Poland, Czech Republic, and India. The Czech and Polish offices are part of VIVnetworks, a subsidiary affiliate network covering all of Central and Eastern Europe.

== Timeline ==
Former Commission Junction competitor beFree, Inc. was acquired by Value-click, Inc. in 2002, before Commission Junction. beFree was gradually phased out in favor of Commission Junction.

On February 3, 2014 Value-click, Inc. announced it has changed its name to Conversant, Inc., bringing former Value-click, Inc. companies Commission Junction, Dotomi, Greystripe, Mediaplex, and Value-click Media under one name.

Conversant was bought by Alliance Data in 2014. Commission Junction continues to be known as CJ Affiliate.

== See also ==
- Affiliate marketing
- Affiliate network
