= Molly K. Macauley =

American economist (1957–2016)

Molly K. MaCauley (June 10, 1957 - July 8, 2016) was an economist specializing in satellites and the United States' space program, and vice president for research at Resources for the Future, a Washington-based think tank. She was murdered by stabbing in 2016. Molly graduated in 1979 from William and Mary with a BA in Economics. She began her career in Space Policy and Space Economics at Resources for the Future, an economic and environmental policy think tank in Washington, DC. She dedicated 35 years of her life building a novel field of analysis with interesting perspectives on the dynamics of space, its regulation, its protection, and its service to humanity. At the time of her death, she was the vice president for research at Resources for the Future.
