= Columbia Institute for Tele-Information =

Columbia University research center

- Founded: 1983; 43 years ago
- Key people: Eli Noam, Director; Robert Atkinson, Director of Policy Studies; Raul Katz, Director of Business Strategy Research; Benjamin Compaine, Director, CITI Fellows Program
- Website: www.citicolumbia.org

The Columbia Institute for Tele-Information (CITI) is one of several research centers for Columbia Business School, focusing on strategy, management, and policy issues in telecommunications, computing, and electronic mass media. It aims to address the large and dynamic telecommunications and media industry that has expanded horizontally and vertically drive by technology, entrepreneurship and policy.

== History ==
Founded in 1983 at Columbia University, the institute is the first research center for communications economics, management, and policy established at a US management school. The institute is located in New York City. Research collaboration among academic, corporate, and public sectors is used to analyze the complex problems associated with managing communications enterprises, systems, and policy in environments of rapidly changing technology and regulation.

== Funding ==
In 2000, the Alfred P. Sloan Foundation selected the institute as its fifteenth academic center for industry research and the only one for the field of telecommunications. This enables CITI to substantially expand its program of research on the telecommunications sector. CITI conducts research on all forms of networks, IT, and electronic media industries. The Sloan Foundation's main objective is for each of its centers to build an academic base of observations and knowledge in order to make practical contributions to the industries studied and accelerate U.S. economic development and global competitiveness. It aims to foster academic-industry collaboration and to develop scholarly expertise by educating the next generation of doctoral students.

== Background ==
The Columbia Institute for Tele-Information is directed by Professor Eli Noam. The Institute is part of Columbia University's traditionally strong role in communications research, going back to Paul Lazarsfeld (audience research methodologies), Edwin Howard Armstrong (FM radio), Michael I. Pupin (long distance transmission), Harvey J. Levin (economic regulation of broadcasting), and Charles Townes and Arthur Schawlow (laser). The Columbia Institute for Tele-Information draws upon the resources of several university departments beyond the Columbia Business School. The School of Engineering and Applied Science is a technology center focusing on the integration of telecommunications networks. The School of Journalism studies the impact and applications of new technology for Journalism. The Institute for Learning Technologies at Teacher's College studies and develops new technology applications. The Law School is strong in issues of intellectual property. The School of the Arts has major involvement in content production such as film. The School of International and Public Affairs deals with global policy issues.

The Institute's research activities are determined by the University's academic principles, and the advice of an Advisory Board drawn from industry, universities, government, and other sectors. All research is public.

== CITI Fellows ==
In 2012 CITI initiated a Fellows Program. Benjamin Compaine is the Director of the Program. The 25 Fellows selected each year are high level government and corporate policy makers along with leading academic and nonprofit researchers. Fellows are expected to participate in monthly virtual one hour seminars held using a video conferencing platform. Speakers are asked to present content that is forward looking, offering new data, raising impending issues and promoting discussion among the Fellows. Speakers often benefit from the feedback provided by the expertise of the assembled Fellows. All sessions are held under the Chatham House Rule

Fellows for 2017-2018:

- Jonathan Aronson-- Prof., Communications & Intl Relations, University of Southern Calif.
- Jonathan Askin -- Prof., Brooklyn Law School
- Robert C. Atkinson-- Director of Policy Studies, CITI and co-director CITI Fellows
- Johannes Bauer --Prof. of Telecom, Michigan State University
- Erik Bohlin --Prof., Tech Assessment, Chalmers University, Sweden
- Julie Brill— Corporate Vice President and Deputy General Counsel, Microsoft
- Ben Compaine –Co-director and Senior Fellow, CITI
- Michelle Connolly--Professor of the Practice of Economics, Duke University
- Bill Dutton -- Director, Quello Center, Michigan State University
- Robert Frieden -- Pioneer Professor-School of Communications, Penn State
- Martha Garcia-Murillo -- Professor- University of Syracuse
- Andrea Glorioso - -Counselor, ICT & Digital Economy, Delegation of the EU to the USA
- Heather Hudson -- Director of Telecom Mgmt, University of San Francisco
- Jonathan Levy- -Deputy Chief Economist, Federal Communications Commission
- Michael Nelson --Internet Studies, Georgetown University
- W. Russell Neuman-- Prof, Media Technology, NYU School of Culture, Education, and Human Development
- Andrew Odlyzko—Professor, School of Mathematics, University of Minnesota
- Jean Prewitt --President and CEO, Independent Film & Television Alliance
- Gregg Sayre --Commissioner, New York State Public Service Commission
- Henning Schulzerine-- Former Chief Technology Officer, Federal Communications Commission
- Marvin Sirbu--Prof., Engineering and Public Policy, Carnegie Mellon University
- Larry Strickling, former Assistant Secretary of Commerce for Communications and Information
- Elena Vartanova --Dean, Faculty of Journalism, Moscow State University
- Leonard Waverman, dean of the DeGroote School of Business at McMaster University
- Kevin Werbach--Professor, Wharton School, University of Pennsylvania
- Steve Wildman --Senior Fellow, Silicon Flatirons Center and visiting scholar, University of Colorado
- Christopher Yoo Professor,--University of Pennsylvania Law School

Speakers have included:

- Ed Richards, U.K.Ofcom
- John Perry Barlow, Electronic Frontier Foundation
- Reed Hundt, past chairman, U.S. Federal Communications Commission
- Blair Levin, Brookings Institution
- Richard Taylor, Penn State University
- Gigi Sohn, Public Knowledge
- David Young, Verizon
- Jon Irwin, Rhapsody
- Michael Copps’ Former FCC Commissioner
- Irwin Jacobs, Qualcomm founder
- Sharon Gillett and Mike Nelson, Microsoft
- Chris Anderson, 3D Robotics
- Holly Goodier, BBC
- Harold Feld, Public Knowledge
- Milo Medin, Google
- Adam Thierer, Mercatus Center, George Mason University
- David Salant, Toulouse School of Economics
- Bob Frankston, Co-founder, SDiftware Arts
- Marc Rotenberg, President, Electronic Privacy Information Center
- Lee McKnight, Kauffman, Syracuse University
- Craig Moffett, MoffettNathanson
- Jim Baller, Baller Herbst Law Group
- Salil Dalvi, former NBCUniversal
- Rob Atkinson, Information Technology & Innovation Foundation
- Esther Dyson, angel investor, philanthropist, and commentator
- Eli Goodman, comScore, Inc.
- James Katz, Boston University
- Christopher Libertelli, Netflix
- Jeff Smuylan, Emmis Communications
- David_Quinalty, Commerce Committee, U.S. Senate
- Min Hang, Tsinghua University
- Rick Whitt, Google
- Michael Kende, Internet Society
- Scott Marcus, former Director of WIK-Consult GmbH
- October 3: David Farber, Professor of Computer Science at the University of Pennsylvania and at Carnegie Mellon University.
- Larry Strickling, who stepped down in January after eight years as U.S. Assistant Secretary of Commerce for Communications and Information.
- Andrew Wise, U.S. Federal Communications Commissions' Deputy Division Chief in the Media Bureau.
- Dan Castro, director of the Center for Data Innovation and vice president of the Information Technology and Innovation Foundation.
- Tom Hazlett, H.H. Macaulay Endowed Professor in Economics and Director of the Information Economy Project at Clemson University.
- Fred Goldstein, a principal at Interisle Consulting Group.
- Bill Lehr. Bill is an economist and consultant as well as a research associate at MIT's Computer Science & Artificial Intelligence Lab.
- Michelle Connolly, professor of the Practice of Economics, Duke University.
