= Eli Noam =

Israeli-American professor and scholar

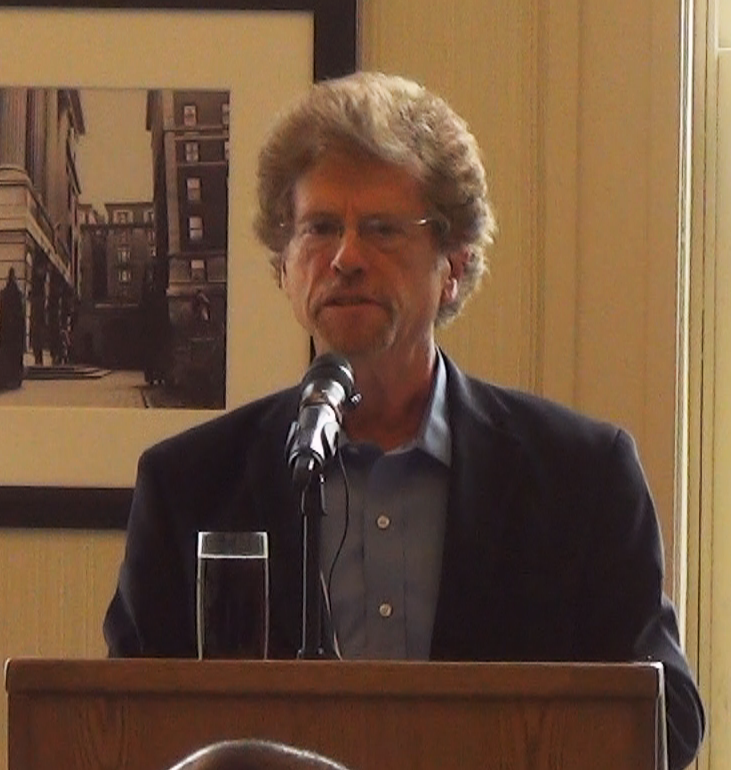
- Noam in 2013
- Born: August 22, 1946 (age 80); Jerusalem, Mandatory Palestine
- Spouse: Nadine Strossen (m. 1980)

Academic background
- Education: Harvard University (BA, MA, JD, PhD)
- Doctoral advisor: Martin Feldstein; Thomas Schelling

Academic work
- Discipline: Macroeconomics
- Institutions: Columbia University

Eli M. Noam (born August 22, 1946) is an American economist and professor at Columbia Business School, where he is the Paul Garrett Chair in Public Policy and Business Responsibility. He is the director of the Columbia Institute for Tele-Information (CITI). He works on the economics, management, and policy of media and the digital world, including global media ownership and on next-generation "Cloud-TV." He has written over 400 articles and has authored, edited, and co-edited over 30 books.

== Education ==
Noam attended Harvard University, where he obtained several degrees, including a Bachelor of Arts in 1970 Phi Beta Kappa and summa cum laude, a Master of Arts in 1972, a Juris Doctor in 1975, and a Ph.D. in 1975. His dissertation advisors were Martin Feldstein (later Chairman of the President's Council of Economic Advisors) and Thomas Schelling (later a recipient of the Nobel Prize in Economics).

== Military service ==
Noam served in the Israel Air Force during the Six-Day War in 1967 and the October War in 1973. He also serves with the Civil Air Patrol as a 1st Lt., Mission Pilot for Search and Rescue in the New York Wing, Phoenix Squadron.

== Career ==
Noam began working as a professor at Columbia Business School in 1976. He took leave to serve a 3-year stint as Commissioner of the New York Public Service Commission, where he took a lead role on issues of local telecom competition, universal service, privacy, and network upgrades. He has also taught at Columbia Law School, Princeton, the University of Pennsylvania, and the Swiss universities of Fribourg and St. Gallen (where he served as the first Virtual Visiting Professor). He is active in the development of electronic distance education. Noam serves as the Director of the Columbia Institute for Tele-Information (CITI). CITI is a university-based research center focusing on management and policy in telecommunications, Internet, and electronic mass media. Noam also initiated the MBA concentration in the Management of Media, Communications, and Information at the Business School. Noam's articles and books are on subjects such as communications, information, public choice, public finance, and general regulation. He was President of the International Media Management Academic Association, 2013–2015. Noam helped to create, and co-taught, the first stand-alone course dedicated to exploring the human rights responsibilities of global business at Columbia Business School in the early 1990s.

== Honors ==
Noam has received honorary doctorates from LMU Munich (2006) and Aix-Marseille University (2008).

== Other activities ==
Noam was a member of the President's Information Technology Advisory Committee (PITAC), a White House appointment, from 2003 to 2005. He was a regular columnist for the Financial Times online edition. Noam has been a member of advisory boards for the Federal government's telecommunications network, of the IRS computer system modernization, the National Commission on the Status of Women in Computing, the NY Governor's Task Force on New Media, and of the Intek Corporation (UK). He is Chairman of the Nexus Mundi Foundation (telemedicine in Africa), and served on boards of the Oxford Internet Institute, Jones International University (the first accredited online university), the Electronic Privacy Information Center, the Minority Media Council, and on several committees of the National Research Council. He was on the Faculty Steering Committee of the Centre National de la Recherche Scientifique (France), the research advisory board of the New York City Police Department (1976-1980), the Mass Media committee of the ACLU (1982-1986), and the Consumer Telecommunications Information Project of the United Church of Christ. He served on scientific advisory boards for the governments of Ireland and Sweden. He is a member of the Columbia University Senate, representing his faculty's tenured professors. Noam has been a participant member of the World Economic Forum and of the Council on Foreign Relations. He is a licensed radio amateur advanced class, and a commercially rated and active pilot. He holds a US patent on a smart packet/e-wallet system.

== Personal life ==
Noam is married to Nadine Strossen, the former National President of the American Civil Liberties Union (ACLU).

== Select publications ==
=== Books (authored, edited, or co-edited) ===
- Who Owns the World’s Media? Media Concentration and Ownership Around the World (Oxford, 2016)
- Media Ownership and Concentration in America (Oxford, 2009). Received the Picard Prize for Best Book in Media Economics in 2010 by the Association for Education in Journalism and Mass Media
- Interconnecting the Network of Networks (MIT, 2001)
- Telecommunications in Europe (Oxford, 1992)
- Television in Europe (Oxford, 1992)
- Broadband Networks, Smart Grids and Climate Change (Springer, 2012)
- Peer-to-Peer Video as a distribution Medium: The Economics, Policy, and Culture of Today’s New Mass Medium (Springer, 2008)
- Mobile Media: Content and Services for Wireless Communications (Erlbaum, 2005)
- Internet Television (Erlbaum, 2004)
- Competition for the Mobile Internet (Artech, 2004)
- Real Options: The New Investment Theory and its Implications for Telecommunications Economics (Kluwer, 2000)
- Public Television in America (Bertelsmann, 1998)
- Privacy in Telecommunications: Markets, Rights, and Regulations (United Church of Christ, 1994)
- The International Market for Film and Television (Ablex, 1992)
- Asymmetric Deregulation (Ablex, 1992)
- Telecommunications in Africa (Oxford, 1999)
- Telecommunications in Latin America (Oxford, 1998)
- Telecommunications in Western Asia (Oxford, 1998)
- Law of International Telecommunications in the United States (Nomos, 1988)
- The Cost of Libel (Columbia, 1989)
- Video Media Competition: Regulation, Economics, and Technology (Columbia, 1985)
- Telecommunications Regulation: Today and Tomorrow (Harcourt, 1982)
- The Impact of Information Technologies on the Service Sector (Ballinger, 1986)
- Technology Without Boundaries (Edited the late Ithiel de Sola Pool's manuscript; Harvard, 1990)
- The Telecommunications Revolution (Routledge, 1992)
- Telecommunications in the Pacific Basin (Oxford, 1994)
- Private Networks and Public Objectives (Elsevier, 1997)
- Globalism and Localism in Telecommunications (Elsevier, 1997)
- The Telecommunications Revolution (Routledge, 1992)
- Textbook: Media and Digital Management – Foundations (Palgrave/Macmillan. Forthcoming)
- Textbook: Media and Digital Management – Advanced (Palgrave/Macmillan. Forthcoming)
- The Content, Impact, and Regulation of Streaming Video: The Next Generation of Media Emerges (Edward Elgar Publishing, 2021)
- The Technology, Business, and Economics of Streaming Video: The Next Generation of Media Emerges (Edward Elgar Publishing, 2021)

In Japanese

- The New Economy, Eli Noam, Thomas Hazlett, Lawrence Lessig, Richard Epstein (2005)
- Telecommunications Meltdown, co-author (2005)
