= Rakuten Advertising =

Marketing service provider

- Company type: Private
- Industry: Internet marketing
- Founded: New York, New York (1996)
- Headquarters: New York, New York
- Key people: Yaz Iida, (President, CEO)
- Products: Affiliate marketing
- Website: www.rakutenadvertising.com

Rakuten Advertising, formerly known as Rakuten Marketing, is an affiliate marketing service provider.

== Acquisition ==
In 2005, Rakuten acquired LinkShare for US$425 million in cash, making LinkShare a wholly owned U.S. division of Rakuten, Inc., a Japanese shopping portal.

== Rebranding ==
Rakuten LinkShare was re-branded to Rakuten Affiliate Network in 2014. In 2020, Rakuten Marketing was renamed as Rakuten Advertising.
