= Affiliate marketing =

Type of performance-based marketing

Affiliate marketing is a marketing arrangement in which affiliates receive a commission for each visit, signup or sale they generate for a merchant. This arrangement allows businesses to outsource part of the sales process. It is a form of performance-based marketing where the commission acts as an incentive for the affiliate. This commission is usually a percentage of the price of the product being sold, but can also be a flat rate per referral.

Affiliate marketers may use various methods to generate these sales, including organic search engine optimization, paid search engine marketing, e-mail marketing, content marketing and display advertising, organic social media marketing, and more.

Though the largest companies run their own affiliate networks (for example Amazon), most merchants join affiliate networks which provide reporting tools and payment processing.

== History ==
=== Origin ===
The concept of revenue sharing—paying commission for referred business—predates affiliate marketing and the Internet. The translation of the revenue share principles to mainstream e-commerce happened in November 1994, almost four years after the origination of the World Wide Web.

The concept of affiliate marketing on the Internet was conceived of, put into practice and patented by William J. Tobin, the founder of PC Flowers & Gifts. Launched on the Prodigy Network in 1989, PC Flowers & Gifts remained on the service until 1996. By 1993, PC Flowers & Gifts had generated sales more than $6 million per year on the Prodigy service. In 1998, PC Flowers and Gifts developed the business model of paying a commission on sales to the Prodigy Network.

In 1994, Tobin launched a beta version of PC Flowers & Gifts on the Internet in cooperation with IBM, which owned half of Prodigy. By 1995 PC Flowers & Gifts had launched a commercial version of the website and had 2,600 affiliate marketing partners on the World Wide Web. Tobin applied for a patent on tracking and affiliate marketing on January 22, 1996, and was issued U.S. Patent number 6,141,666 on Oct 31, 2000. Tobin also received Japanese Patent number 4021941 on Oct 5, 2007, and U.S. Patent number 7,505,913 on Mar 17, 2009, for affiliate marketing and tracking. In July 1998 PC Flowers and Gifts merged with Fingerhut and Federated Department Stores.

In November 1994, CDNow launched its BuyWeb program. CDNow had the idea that music-oriented websites could review or list albums on their pages that their visitors might be interested in purchasing. These websites could also offer a link that would take visitors directly to CDNow to purchase the albums. The idea for remote purchasing originally arose from conversations with the music label Geffen Records in the fall of 1994. The management at Geffen wanted to sell its artists' CDs directly from its website but did not want to implement this capability itself. Geffen asked CDNow if it could design a program where CDNow would handle order fulfillment. Geffen realized that CDNow could link directly from the artist on its website to Geffen's website, bypassing the CDNow home page and going directly to the artist's music page.

Amazon.com (Amazon) launched its associate program in July 1996: Amazon associates could place banner or text links on their site for individual books, or link directly to the Amazon home page.

When visitors clicked on the associate's website to go to Amazon and purchase a book, the associate received a commission. Amazon was not the first merchant to offer an affiliate program, but its program was the first to become widely known and serve as a model for subsequent programs.

In February 2000, Amazon announced that it had been granted a patent on components of an affiliate program. The patent application was submitted in June 1997, which predates most affiliate programs, but not PC Flowers & Gifts.com (October 1994), AutoWeb.com (October 1995), Kbkids.com/BrainPlay.com (January 1996), EPage (April 1996), and several others.

=== Historic development ===
Affiliate marketing has grown quickly since its inception. The e-commerce website, viewed as a marketing toy in the early days of the Internet, became an integrated part of the overall business plan and in some cases grew to a bigger business than the existing offline business. According to one report, the total sales amount generated through affiliate networks in 2006 was £2.16 billion in the United Kingdom alone. The estimates were £1.35 billion in sales in 2005. MarketingSherpa's research team estimated that, in 2006, affiliates worldwide earned US$6.5 billion in bounty and commissions from a variety of sources in retail, personal finance, gaming and gambling, travel, telecom, education, publishing, and forms of lead generation other than contextual advertising programs.

In 2006, the most active sectors for affiliate marketing were adult gambling, retail industries and file-sharing services. The three sectors expected to experience the greatest growth are the mobile phone, finance, and travel sectors. Soon after these sectors came the entertainment (particularly gaming) and Internet-related services (particularly broadband) sectors. Also several of the affiliate solution providers expect to see increased interest from business-to-business marketers and advertisers in using affiliate marketing as part of their mix.

=== Web 2.0 ===
Websites and services based on Web 2.0 concepts—blogging and interactive online communities, for example—have impacted the affiliate marketing world as well. These platforms allow improved communication between merchants and affiliates. Web 2.0 platforms have also opened affiliate marketing channels to personal bloggers, writers, and independent website owners. Contextual ads allow publishers with lower levels of web traffic to place affiliate ads on websites.

== Compensation methods ==
=== Predominant compensation methods ===
Eighty percent of affiliate programs today use revenue sharing or pay per sale (PPS) as a compensation method, nineteen percent use cost per action (CPA), and the remaining programs use other methods such as cost per click (CPC) or cost per mille (CPM, cost per estimated 1000 views).

=== Diminished compensation methods ===
Within more mature markets, less than one percent of traditional affiliate marketing programs today use cost per click and cost per mille. However, these compensation methods are used heavily in display advertising and paid search.

Cost per mille requires only that the publisher make the advertising available on his or her website and display it to the page visitors in order to receive a commission. Pay per click requires one additional step in the conversion process to generate revenue for the publisher: A visitor must not only be made aware of the advertisement but must also click on the advertisement to visit the advertiser's website.

Cost per click was more common in the early days of affiliate marketing but has diminished in use over time due to click fraud issues very similar to the click fraud issues modern search engines are facing today. Contextual advertising programs are not considered in the statistic pertaining to the diminished use of cost per click, as it is uncertain if contextual advertising can be considered affiliate marketing.

While these models have diminished in mature e-commerce and online advertising markets they are still prevalent in some more nascent industries. China is one example where Affiliate Marketing does not overtly resemble the same model in the West. With many affiliates being paid a flat "Cost Per Day" with some networks offering Cost Per Click or CPM.

=== Performance/affiliate marketing ===
In the case of cost per mille/click, the publisher is not concerned about whether a visitor is a member of the audience that the advertiser tries to attract and is able to convert because at this point the publisher has already earned his commission. This leaves the greater, and, in case of cost per mille, the full risk and loss (if the visitor cannot be converted) to the advertiser.

Cost per action/sale methods require that referred visitors do more than visit the advertiser's website before the affiliate receives a commission. The advertiser must convert that visitor first. It is in the best interest of the affiliate to send the most closely targeted traffic to the advertiser as possible to increase the chance of a conversion. The risk is absorbed by the affiliate who funnels their traffic to the campaign (normally a landing page). In the case a conversion is not fired the publisher will not receive any compensation for the traffic.

Affiliate marketing is also called "performance marketing", in reference to how sales employees are typically being compensated. Such employees are typically paid a commission for each sale they close, and sometimes are paid performance incentives for exceeding objectives. Affiliates are not employed by the advertiser whose products or services they promote, but the compensation models applied to affiliate marketing are very similar to the ones used for people in the advertisers' internal sales department.

While affiliate marketing is sometimes compared to having an extended sales force, affiliates typically have limited influence over prospects after referral. The primary difference between the two is that affiliate marketers provide little if any influence on a possible prospect in the conversion process once that prospect is directed to the advertiser's website. The sales team of the advertiser, however, does have the control and influence up to the point where the prospect either a) signs the contract, or b) completes the purchase.

== Multi-tier programs ==
Affiliate marketing overlaps with network marketing, also known as multi-level marketing (MLM). Multi-level refers to different levels of compensation offered by companies to different tiers of distributor. While MLM schemes are not inherently illegal, they become illegal when income from recruitment-fees and similar exceeds the sale of actual goods and services. In these situations, MLM schemes overlap with pyramid schemes and ponzi schemes.

Some advertisers offer multi-tier programs that distribute commission into a hierarchical referral network of sign-ups and sub-partners. In practical terms, publisher "A" signs up to the program with an advertiser and gets rewarded for the agreed activity conducted by a referred visitor. If publisher "A" attracts publishers "B" and "C" to sign up for the same program using his sign-up code, all future activities performed by publishers "B" and "C" will result in additional commission (at a lower rate) for publisher "A".

Two-tier programs exist in the minority of affiliate programs; most are simply one-tier.

== From the advertiser's perspective ==
=== Advantages for merchants ===
Merchants favor affiliate marketing because in most cases it uses a "pay for performance" model, meaning that the merchant does not incur a marketing expense unless results are accrued (excluding any initial setup cost).

=== Implementation options ===
Some merchants run their own (in-house) affiliate programs using dedicated software, while others use third-party intermediaries to track traffic or sales that are referred from affiliates. There are two different types of affiliate management methods used by merchants: standalone software or hosted services, typically called affiliate networks. Payouts to affiliates or publishers can be made by the networks on behalf of the merchant, by the network, consolidated across all merchants where the publisher has a relationship with and earned commissions or directly by the merchant itself.

=== Affiliate management and program management outsourcing ===
Uncontrolled affiliate programs aid rogue affiliates, who use spamming, trademark infringement, false advertising, cookie stuffing, typosquatting, and other unethical methods that have given affiliate marketing a negative reputation.

Some merchants are using outsourced (affiliate) program management (OPM) companies, which are themselves often run by affiliate managers and network program managers. OPM companies perform affiliate program management for the merchants as a service, similar to the role an advertising agencies serves in offline marketing.

=== Types of affiliate websites ===
Affiliate websites are often categorized by merchants (advertisers) and affiliate networks. There are currently no industry-wide standards for the categorization. The following types of websites are generic, yet are commonly understood and used by affiliate marketers.

- Search affiliates that utilize pay per click search engines to promote the advertisers' offers (i.e., search arbitrage)
- Price comparison service websites and directories
- Loyalty websites, typically characterized by providing a reward or incentive system for purchases via points, miles, cash back
- Cause Related Marketing sites that offer charitable donations
- Coupon and rebate websites that focus on sales promotions
- Content and niche market websites, including product review sites
- E-mail marketing list affiliates (i.e., owners of large opt-in -mail lists that typically employ e-mail drip marketing) and newsletter list affiliates, which are typically more content-heavy
- Shopping directories that list merchants by categories without providing coupons, price comparisons, or other features based on information that changes frequently, thus requiring continual updates
- Cost per action networks (i.e., top-tier affiliates) that expose offers from the advertiser with which they are affiliated with their own network of affiliates
- Websites using adbars (e.g. AdSense) to display context-sensitive advertising for products on the site

=== Publisher recruitment ===
Affiliate networks that already have several advertisers typically also have a large pool of publishers. These publishers could be potentially recruited, and there is also an increased chance that publishers in the network apply to the program on their own, without the need for recruitment efforts by the advertiser.

Relevant websites that attract the same target audiences as the advertiser but without competing with it are potential affiliate partners as well. Vendors or existing customers can also become recruits if doing so makes sense and does not violate any laws or regulations (such as with pyramid schemes).

Almost any website could be recruited as an affiliate publisher, but high traffic websites are more likely interested in (for their sake) low-risk cost per mille or medium-risk cost per click deals rather than higher-risk cost per action or revenue share deals.

== Past and current issues ==
Since the emergence of affiliate marketing, there has been little control over affiliate activity. Unscrupulous affiliates have used spam, false advertising, forced clicks (to get tracking cookies set on users' computers), adware, and other methods to drive traffic to their sponsors. Although many affiliate programs have terms of service that contain rules against spam, this marketing method has historically proven to attract abuse from spammers.

=== E-mail spam ===
In the infancy of affiliate marketing, many Internet users held negative opinions due to the tendency of affiliates to use spam to promote the programs in which they were enrolled. As affiliate marketing matured, many affiliate merchants have refined their terms and conditions to prohibit affiliates from spamming.

=== Malicious browser extensions ===
A browser extension is a plug-in that extends the functionality of a web browser. Some extensions are authored using web technologies such as HTML, JavaScript, and CSS. Most modern web browsers have a whole slew of third-party extensions available for download. In recent years, there has been a constant rise in the number of malicious browser extensions flooding the web. Malicious browser extensions will often appear to be legitimate as they seem to originate from vendor websites and come with glowing customer reviews.

In the case of affiliate marketing, these malicious extensions are often used to redirect a user's browser to send fake clicks to websites that are supposedly part of legitimate affiliate marketing programs. Typically, users are unaware this is happening other than their browser performance slowing down. Websites end up paying for fake traffic numbers, and users are unwitting participants in these ad schemes.

=== Search engine spam ===
As search engines have become more prominent, some affiliate marketers have shifted from sending e-mail spam to creating automatically generated web pages that often contain product data feeds provided by merchants. The goal of such web pages is to manipulate the relevancy or prominence of resources indexed by a search engine, also known as spamdexing. Each page can be targeted to a different niche market through the use of specific keywords, with the result being a skewed form of search engine optimization.

Spam is the biggest threat to organic search engines, whose goal is to provide quality search results for keywords or phrases entered by their users. Google's PageRank algorithm update ("BigDaddy") in February 2006—the final stage of Google's major update ("Jagger") that began in mid-summer 2005—specifically targeted spamdexing with great success. This update thus enabled Google to remove a large amount of mostly computer-generated duplicate content from its index. Websites consisting mostly of affiliate links have previously held a negative reputation for underdelivering quality content. In 2005 there were active changes made by Google, where certain websites were labeled as "thin affiliates". Such websites were either removed from Google's index or were relocated within the results page (i.e., moved from the top-most results to a lower position). To avoid this categorization, affiliate marketer webmasters must create quality content on their websites that distinguishes their work from the work of spammers or banner farms, which only contain links leading to merchant sites.

=== Adware ===
Although it differs from spyware, adware often uses the same methods and technologies. Merchants initially were uninformed about adware, what impact it had, and how it could damage their brands. Affiliate marketers became aware of the issue much more quickly, especially because they noticed that adware often overwrites tracking cookies, thus resulting in a decline of commissions. Affiliates not employing adware felt that it was stealing commission from them. Adware often has no valuable purpose and rarely provides any useful content to the user, who is typically unaware that such software is installed on his/her computer.

Affiliates discussed the issues in Internet forums and began to organize their efforts. They believed that the best way to address the problem was to discourage merchants from advertising via adware. Merchants that were either indifferent to or supportive of adware were exposed by affiliates, thus damaging those merchants' reputations and tarnishing their affiliate marketing efforts. Many affiliates either terminated the use of such merchants or switched to a competitor's affiliate program. Eventually, affiliate networks were also forced by merchants and affiliates to take a stand and ban certain adware publishers from their network. The result was Code of Conduct by Commission Junction/beFree and Performics, LinkShare's Anti-Predatory Advertising Addendum, and ShareASale's complete ban of software applications as a medium for affiliates to promote advertiser offers. Regardless of the progress made, adware continues to be an issue, as demonstrated by the class action lawsuit against ValueClick and its daughter company Commission Junction filed on April 20, 2007.

=== Trademark bidding ===
Affiliates were among the earliest adopters of pay per click advertising when the first pay-per-click search engines emerged during the end of the 1990s. Later in 2000 Google launched its pay per click service, Google AdWords, which is responsible for the widespread use and acceptance of pay per click as an advertising channel. An increasing number of merchants engaged in pay per click advertising, either directly or via a search marketing agency, and realized that this space was already occupied by their affiliates. Although this situation alone created advertising channel conflicts and debates between advertisers and affiliates, the largest issue concerned affiliates bidding on advertisers names, brands, and trademarks. Several advertisers began to adjust their affiliate program terms to prohibit their affiliates from bidding on those type of keywords. Some advertisers, however, did and still do embrace this behavior, going so far as to allow, or even encourage, affiliates to bid on any term, including the advertiser's trademarks.

=== Compensation disclosure ===
Bloggers and other publishers may not be aware of disclosure guidelines set forth by the FTC. Guidelines affect celebrity endorsements, advertising language, and blogger compensation.

=== Lack of industry standards ===
==== Certification and training ====
Affiliate marketing currently lacks industry standards for training and certification. There are some training courses and seminars that result in certifications; however, the acceptance of such certifications is mostly due to the reputation of the individual or company issuing the certification. Affiliate marketing is not commonly taught in universities, and only a few college instructors work with Internet marketers to introduce the subject to students majoring in marketing.

Education occurs most often in "real life" by becoming involved and learning the details as time progresses. Although there are several books on the topic, some so-called "how-to" or "silver bullet" books instruct readers to manipulate holes in the Google algorithm, which can quickly become out of date, or suggest strategies no longer endorsed or permitted by advertisers.

Outsourced Program Management companies typically combine formal and informal training, providing much of their training through group collaboration and brainstorming. Such companies also try to send each marketing employee to the industry conference of their choice.

Other training resources used include online forums, weblogs, podcasts, video seminars, and specialty websites.

==== Code of conduct ====
A code of conduct was released by affiliate networks Commission Junction/beFree and Performics in December 2002 to guide practices and adherence to ethical standards for online advertising.

=== Sales tax vulnerability ===
In 2008 the state of New York passed a law asserting sales tax jurisdiction over Amazon.com sales to New York residents. New York was aware of Amazon affiliates operating within the state. In Quill Corp. v. North Dakota, the US Supreme Court ruled that the presence of independent sales representatives may allow a state to require sales tax collections. New York determined that affiliates are such independent sales representatives. The New York law became known as "Amazon's law" and was quickly emulated by other states. While that was the first time states successfully addressed the internet tax gap, since 2018 states have been free to assert sales tax jurisdiction over sales to their residents regardless of the presence of retailer affiliates.

=== Click to reveal ===
Many voucher code web sites use a click-to-reveal format, which requires the web site user to click to reveal the voucher code. The action of clicking places the cookie on the website visitor's computer. In the United Kingdom, the IAB Affiliate Council under chair Matt Bailey announced regulations that stated that "Affiliates must not use a mechanism whereby users are encouraged to click to interact with content where it is unclear or confusing what the outcome will be."

== See also ==
- Affiliate tracking software
- Affiliate network
