= Affiliate network =

Website marketing network

An affiliate network acts as an intermediary between publishers (affiliates) and merchant affiliate programs. It allows website publishers to more easily find and participate in affiliate programs which are suitable for their website (and thus generate income from those programs), and allows websites offering affiliate programs (typically online merchants) to reach a larger audience by promoting their affiliate programs to all of the publishers participating in the affiliate network.

== Uses ==
Traditional affiliate networks enable merchants to offer publishers a share of any revenue that is generated by the merchant from visitors to the publisher's site, or a fee for each visitor on the publisher's site that completes a specific action (making a purchase, registering for a newsletter, etc.). The majority of merchant programs have a revenue share model, as opposed to a fee-per-action model.

For merchants, affiliate network services and benefits may include tracking technology, reporting tools, payment processing, and access to a large base of publishers. For affiliates, services and benefits can include simplifying the process of registering for one or more merchant affiliate programs, reporting tools, access to product API's and payment aggregation.

Affiliates are generally able to join affiliate networks for free, whereas there is generally a fee for merchants to participate. Traditional affiliate networks might charge an initial setup fee and/or a recurring membership fee. It is also common for affiliate networks to charge merchants a percentage of the commissions paid to affiliates, this is known as an 'over-ride' and is payable on top of the affiliates commission.

Affiliate networks are also wary of new affiliates who do not have any known connections or experience in the industry because there have been many instances where individuals have tried to game the affiliate network. The current technological advances have given many tools to affiliate networks to fight cyber fraud in a more meaningful and effective way.

Affiliate Marketers can also join as an affiliate directly with major companies as they may have affiliate programs on their websites.

== Performance network ==
In addition to the traditional networks, performance networks also exist. Performance networks are typically networks that, in addition to performance based promotions also offer CPM- or CPC-based display advertising. Performance networks, on the other hand, are often so-called "Middle Men" who are themselves affiliates of merchants via the traditional affiliate networks.

== See also ==
- Advertising network or ad network
- Affiliate marketing
