= Moncef Slaoui =

Moroccan-American-Belgian doctor and researcher

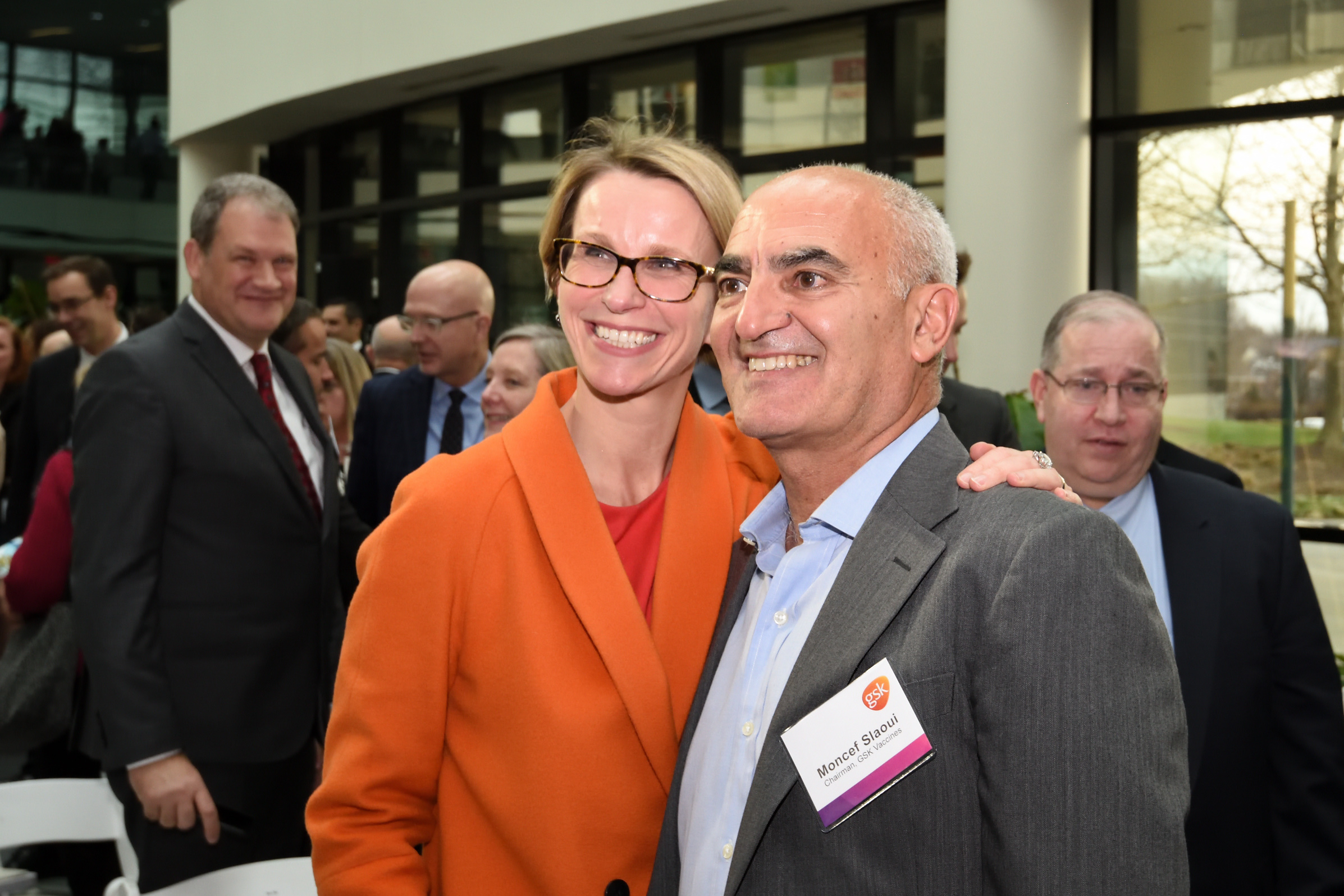
- Slaoui with GlaxoSmithKline CEO Emma Walmsley (December 2016)

Head of Operation Warp Speed
- In office May 15, 2020 – January 12, 2021
- President: Donald Trump
- Preceded by: Office established
- Succeeded by: David A. Kessler

Personal details
- Born: Moncef Mohamed Slaoui; July 22, 1959 (age 67) Agadir, Morocco
- Citizenship: Morocco; Belgium; United States
- Children: 3
- Education: Université libre de Bruxelles (BS, MS, PhD); International Institute for Management Development (MBA)
- Occupation: University of Mons; SmithKline-RIT; GlaxoSmithKline; Medicxi
- Profession: Molecular biology; Immunology
- Known for: Operation Warp Speed

Moncef Mohamed Slaoui (English: /ˈmɒnsɪf ˈslaʊ.i/; French: [mɔ̃sɛf slawi]; Moroccan Arabic: منصف السلاوي, IPA: [ˈmonsˤəf ˈsːlæwi]; born July 22, 1959) is a Moroccan-born researcher who served as the head of Operation Warp Speed (OPWASP) under President Donald Trump from 2020 to 2021.

Slaoui is the former head of the vaccines department at GlaxoSmithKline (GSK). He worked at the company for thirty years, retiring in 2017. On May 15, 2020, President Donald Trump announced that Slaoui would manage the U.S. government's development of a vaccine used to treat coronavirus disease in OPWASP; Slaoui resigned on January 12, 2021 after successfully having helped introduce a number of vaccines to the US and global markets.

In March 2021, Slaoui was fired from the board of GSK subsidiary Galvani Bioelectronics over what GSK called “substantiated” sexual harassment allegations stemming from his time at the parent company. Slaoui issued an apology statement and stepped down from positions at other companies at the same time.

== Early life and education ==
Slaoui was born on July 22, 1959, in Agadir, Morocco. The city was evacuated in February 1960 after an earthquake, and Slaoui was raised in Casablanca. His father worked in the irrigation business and died when Slaoui was a teenager, leaving his mother to raise him and his four siblings.

Slaoui graduated from Mohammed V High School in Casablanca. In 1976 at age 17, Slaoui left Morocco to study medicine in France but missed the registration deadline due to new registration procedures and his mother being ill. He enrolled at the Université libre de Bruxelles, where he received a BS and MS in biology. During this time he was very politically active. In 1983, Slaoui earned a PhD in molecular biology and immunology from the Free University of Brussels. His thesis was titled Etude de la diversité et de la sélection des répertoires idiotypiques dans le système immunitaire. Slaoui's doctoral advisor was immunologist Jacques Urbain.

Slaoui took postgraduate courses at Harvard Medical School and the Tufts University School of Medicine without earning degrees. In 1998, he received an accelerated MBA from the International Institute for Management Development (IMD) in Lausanne, Switzerland.

== Career ==
Slaoui and his wife lived in the United States from 1983 to 1985 while each did post-doctoral research at Harvard. When she was recruited to continue research on influenza at SmithKline-RIT in Belgium (which would later become part of GlaxoSmithKline (GSK)), Slaoui got a job teaching immunology at the University of Mons in Belgium.

Slaoui has co-authored more than 100 research papers.

=== GlaxoSmithKline ===
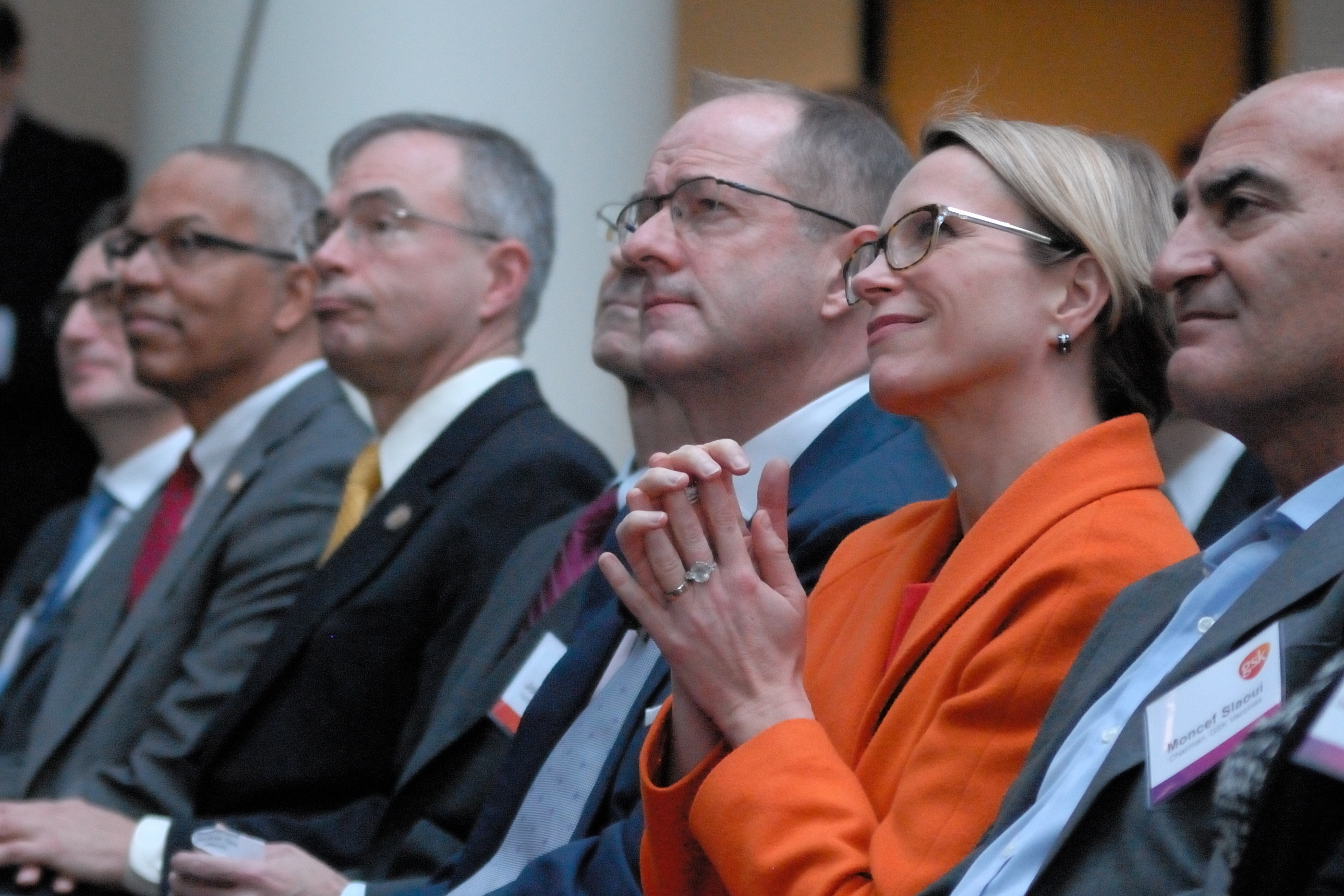
Slaoui (far right) at a GSK event in December 2016

In 1988, after consulting for SmithKline-RIT for three years, Slaoui joined the company as a vaccine researcher. In 2006, he was appointed head of research and development at GlaxoSmithKline, succeeding Tachi Yamada. In 2007, he announced plans to establish a neurosciences research group in Shanghai that would employ a thousand scientists and cost $100 million; it ceased operations in August 2017.

In 2008, Slaoui led the $720 million acquisition of Sirtris Pharmaceuticals, which folded amidst turmoil in 2013. In 2012, he oversaw GSK's purchase of Human Genome Sciences for over $3 billion. He "sold off GSK’s entire oncology business, which Novartis turned into a 'cancer heavyweight'". One "pharma industry veteran" told a reporter in 2020 that "those are three of the worst deals in drug industry history."

Slaoui spent thirty years working at GSK. During his time there, Slaoui oversaw the development of numerous vaccines, including Cervarix to prevent cervical cancer, Rotarix to prevent gastroenteritis in children, and an Ebola vaccine. He also spent 27 years researching on a malaria vaccine, Mosquirix, that was approved by the European Medicines Agency in 2015 and touted as the first in the world.

In April 2013, he co-wrote a paper with several other GSK heads that introduced the term "electroceutical" to broadly encompass medical devices that use electrical, mechanical, or light stimulation to affect electrical signaling in relevant tissue types. Over the next several years, he attempted to sell a public audience on GSK's development of bioelectronic medicine, with appearances on YouTube and at futurist conferences.

In July 2013, he wrote an op-ed in the Huffington Post entitled "It’s Time to Further Incentivize Medical Innovation", in which he outlined three recommendations to improve the effectiveness of the pharmaceutical industry.

The Slaoui Center for Vaccines Research in Rockville, Maryland—named after Slaoui and GSK's first research and development institute in the United States—was opened on December 14, 2016.

As of 2016, Slaoui was on the board of directors of the PhRMA lobby.

In 2016 he was named to the inaugural board of directors of Galvani Bioelectronics, the joint venture between GSK and Alphabet Inc. subsidiary Verily Life Sciences.

Slaoui retired from GSK on June 30, 2017.

=== Corporate directorships ===
In July 2017, he joined Moderna's Board of Directors.

In September 2017, he joined European venture capital firm Medicxi.

=== COVID-19 pandemic and OPWASP ===
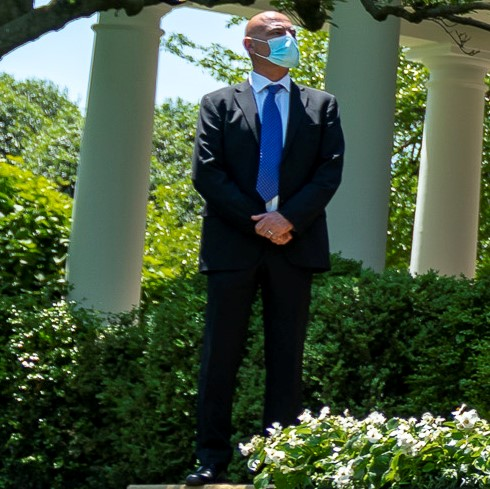
Slaoui in the White House Rose Garden, May 15, 2020

On May 15, 2020, President Donald Trump officially announced OPWASP, a project to develop and deliver 300 million doses of a vaccine for the coronavirus disease 2019 by January 2021. Slaoui was named to lead the project, working alongside chief operating officer and four-star general Gustave F. Perna. Other candidates for Slaoui's position reportedly included Elias Zerhouni and Arthur Levinson. President Trump described Slaoui as "one of the most respected men in the world in the production and, really, on the formulation of vaccines", while Secretary of Health and Human Services Alex Azar praised him as "arguably the world’s most experienced and successful vaccine developer".

To avoid a conflict of interest, Slaoui resigned from the board of the Massachusetts-based biotech firm Moderna, which had been developing a vaccine for the coronavirus. Slaoui faced criticism, particularly from Senator Elizabeth Warren, for continuing to have Moderna stock options worth over $10 million. On May 18, 2020, Slaoui resigned from the board of manufacturing firm Lonza, which Moderna had partnered with to develop a coronavirus vaccine. On May 19, after initially denying a conflict of interest, Slaoui divested his Moderna stock and donated the value it had gained from May 14 onwards to cancer research.

On May 20, The New York Times reported that Slaoui had also resigned as an adviser to Brii Biosciences, a firm with sizeable Chinese investments, and would be resigning from Artizan Biosciences and Clazado. According to Michael Caputo, Slaoui's decision to retain his GSK stock, even after being announced as OPWASP's chief adviser, was cleared by the Department of Health and Human Services.

Slaoui was scheduled to speak at the annual Biotechnology Innovation Organization (BIO) conference on June 9, 2020, but ultimately pulled out, citing his failure to brief Congress beforehand.

On October 9, 2020, in a profile of Slaoui, the Wall Street Journal said the COVID-19 vaccines would be accompanied by a tracking system provided jointly by McKesson, Google and Oracle. The tracking is geared towards monitoring vaccine series uptake, as well as side effects.

Slaoui resigned from OPWASP on January 12, 2021.

=== Sexual harassment allegations ===
On March 24, 2021, Slaoui was fired as chairman of the board of directors of Galvani Bioelectronics, a medical research firm owned mostly by GSK, over what the board of GSK called “substantiated” sexual harassment allegations. In a statement, GSK said they had received a letter a month before Slaoui’s dismissal “containing allegations of sexual harassment and inappropriate conduct towards an employee of GSK by Dr. Slaoui” that “occurred several years ago when he was an employee of GSK”. Slaoui issued an apology for his behavior. He returned $3.86 million to GSK under a clawback policy.

== Personal life ==
Slaoui is Muslim. He is fluent in Arabic, English, and French. He is a citizen of Morocco, Belgium, and the United States.

Slaoui has three sons and is married to Kristen Slaoui (née Belmonte), a 1992 graduate of Gettysburg College. Slaoui's younger sister died at a young age from pertussis. One of his two younger brothers, a pediatrician, Amine, died from pancreatic cancer. His other brother, Mohamed, is a specialist in gastroenterology and his older sister, Hadia, is a university professor of French literature in Morocco.

== Memberships ==
=== GSK-related ===
- 2006–2015: Global Research & Development of GSK PLC, chairman
- 2006–2017: GSK PLC, board member
- 2009–2017: Global Vaccines of GSK PLC, chairman

=== Voluntary positions ===
- 2009–2020: Qatar Foundation, advisory board member
- Hamad Bin Khalifa University, board member
- 2015-2017: International AIDS Vaccine Initiative, board member
- 2018: Human Vaccines Project, board member
- National Academies of Sciences, Engineering, and Medicine, Forum on Medical and Public Health Preparedness for Disasters and Emergencies, member

=== After GSK ===
- 2016–2021: Galvani Bioelectronics, board member; chairman
- August 2017: Intellia Therapeutics, board member for two weeks before resigning for undisclosed conflict of interests
- 2017: SutroVax, board member; chairman
- 2017: Divide & Conquer LLC, director
- 2018: Monopteros LLC, chairman
- 2020–2020: Lonza Group, board member
- 2017–2020: Moderna, board member
- Until 2020: Artizan Biotechnology, board member
- Until 2020: Brii Biosciences, scientific and strategic advisor
- Until 2020: Clasado Biosciences, chairman

=== Trade-related ===
- Biotechnology Innovation Organization (BIO), Health & Regulatory Affairs Committee, member
- PhRMA Foundation, board member

== Recognition ==
Gettysburg College awarded Slaoui an honorary Doctor of Science in May 2017. In 2012, Slaoui was named as one of the "25 most influential people in biopharma today" by FierceBiotech. In 2016, Fortune ranked him among "The World's 50 Greatest Leaders". The Medicine Maker included Slaoui in its 2018 list of "World’s Top 100 Medicine Makers".

Slaoui was cited as one of the Top 100 most influential Africans by New African magazine in 2020.

In 2020, Slaoui named by Carnegie Corporation of New York as an honoree of the Great Immigrants Award.

== Selected works and publications ==
=== Works ===
- Slaoui, Mohamed Monsif (1983). Etude de la diversité et de la sélection des répertoires idiotypiques dans le système immunitaire (in French). Bruxelles: Université libre de Bruxelles, Faculté des sciences. "identifier: ulbcat.ulb.ac.be:537608"
- Rosenthal, Susan L.; Stanberry, Lawrence R.; Biro, Frank M.; Slaoui, Moncef; Francotte, Myriam; Koutsoukos, Marguerite; Hayes, Marianne; Bernstein, David I. (February 1997). "Seroprevalence of Herpes Simplex Virus Types 1 and 2 and Cytomegalovirus in Adolescents". Clinical Infectious Diseases. 24 (2): 135–139. doi:10.1093/clinids/24.2.135. PMID 9114136. Wikidata ()
- Keadle, Tammie L.; Laycock, Keith A.; Miller, Judith Kelvin; Hook, Kelly K.; Fenoglio, E. D.; Francotte, Myriam; Slaoui, Moncef; Stuart, P. Michael; Pepose, Jay S. (August 1997). "Efficacy of a Recombinant Glycoprotein D Subunit Vaccine on the Development of Primary and Recurrent Ocular Infection with Herpes Simplex Virus Type 1 in Mice". The Journal of Infectious Diseases. 176 (2): 331–338. doi:10.1086/514049. PMID 9237697. Wikidata ()
- Stanberry, Lawrence R.; Spruance, Spotswood L.; Cunningham, Anthony L.; Bernstein, David I.; Mindel, Adrian; Sacks, Stephen; Tyring, Stephen; Aoki, Fred Y.; Slaoui, Moncef; Denis, Martine; Vandepapeliere, Pierre; Dubin, Gary (November 21, 2002). "Glycoprotein-D–Adjuvant Vaccine to Prevent Genital Herpes". The New England Journal of Medicine. 347 (21): 1652–1661. doi:10.1056/NEJMOA011915. PMID 12444179. Wikidata ()
- Bourne, Nigel; Bravo, Fernando J.; Francotte, Myriam; Bernstein, David I.; Myers, Martin G.; Slaoui, Moncef; Stanberry, Lawrence R. (February 15, 2003). "Herpes Simplex Virus (HSV) Type 2 Glycoprotein D Subunit Vaccines and Protection against Genital HSV-1 or HSV-2 Disease in Guinea Pigs". The Journal of Infectious Diseases. 187 (4): 542–549. doi:10.1086/374002. PMID 12599070. Wikidata ()
- Slaoui, Moncef (April 23, 2010). "The rise and fall of rosiglitazone: reply". European Heart Journal. 31 (10): 1282–1284. doi:10.1093/EURHEARTJ/EHQ118. PMID 20499440. Wikidata ()
- Famm, Kristoffer; Litt, Brian; Tracey, Kevin J.; Boyden, Edward S.; Slaoui, Moncef (April 10, 2013). "A jump-start for electroceuticals". Nature. 496 (7444): 159–161. doi:10.1038/496159A. PMC 4179459. PMID 23579662. Wikidata ()
- Uguen, David; Lönngren, Thomas; Le Cam, Yann; Garner, Sarah; Voisin, Emmanuelle; Incerti, Carlo; Dunoyer, Marc; Slaoui, Moncef (2014). "Accelerating development, registration and access to medicines for rare diseases in the European Union through adaptive approaches: features and perspectives". Orphanet Journal of Rare Diseases. 9 (1): 20. doi:10.1186/1750-1172-9-20. PMC 3923002. PMID 24513034. Wikidata ()

=== Publications ===
- Slaoui, Moncef (July 1, 2013). "It's Time to Further Incentivize Medical Innovation". Huffington Post.
