= 64th Brigade Support Battalion (United States) =

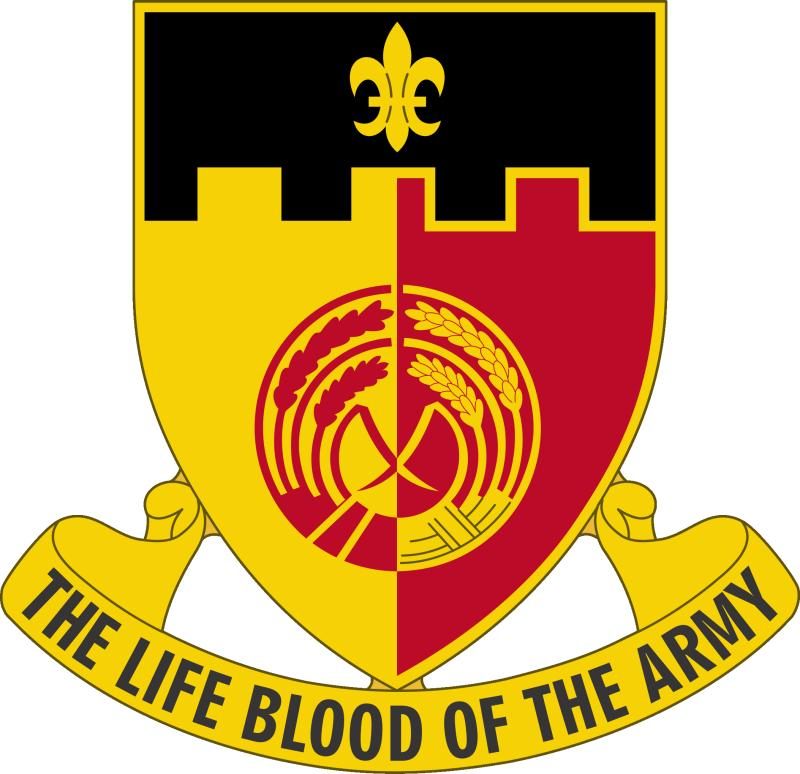
- Distinctive Unit Insignia
- Active: 1942-1949, 1950-1953, 1963-1970, 1975-1984, 1987 – present
- Country: United States
- Branch: US Army
- Type: Military Logistics
- Size: Battalion
- Part of: 3rd Armored Brigade Combat Team, 4th Infantry Division
- Garrison/HQ: Fort Carson, Colorado
- Nickname: Mountaineers
- Motto: "The Life Blood of the Army" (Official)
- Colors: Buff, Scarlet, Yellow
- Anniversaries: 29 April
- Engagements: World War II Vietnam War Iraq War
- Decorations: Valorous Unit Award, Meritorious Unit Commendation, Superior Unit Award
- Website: https://www.facebook.com/64BSB/

Commanders
- Current commander: LTC Sadat Allhassan
- Command Sergeant Major: CSM John V. Nguyen

The 64th Brigade Support Battalion, nicknamed "Mountaineers," is a United States Army support battalion, assigned to the 3rd Armored Brigade Combat Team, 4th Infantry Division in Fort Carson, Colorado.

== History ==
The 64th Brigade Support Battalion was originally constituted as the 64th Quartermaster Battalion on 29 April 1942, and activated on 15 August 1942 at Camp Barkeley, Texas as the 64th Quartermaster Battalion (Laundry).

=== World War II ===
The battalion arrived in Lydney, England on 16 December 1943, and was redesignated the 64th Quartermaster Battalion (Base Depot) or "64th QMBD," under the command structure of the Advanced Section (ADSEC) directly supporting the 12th Army Group throughout the war in support of the European Theater of Operations (ETO).

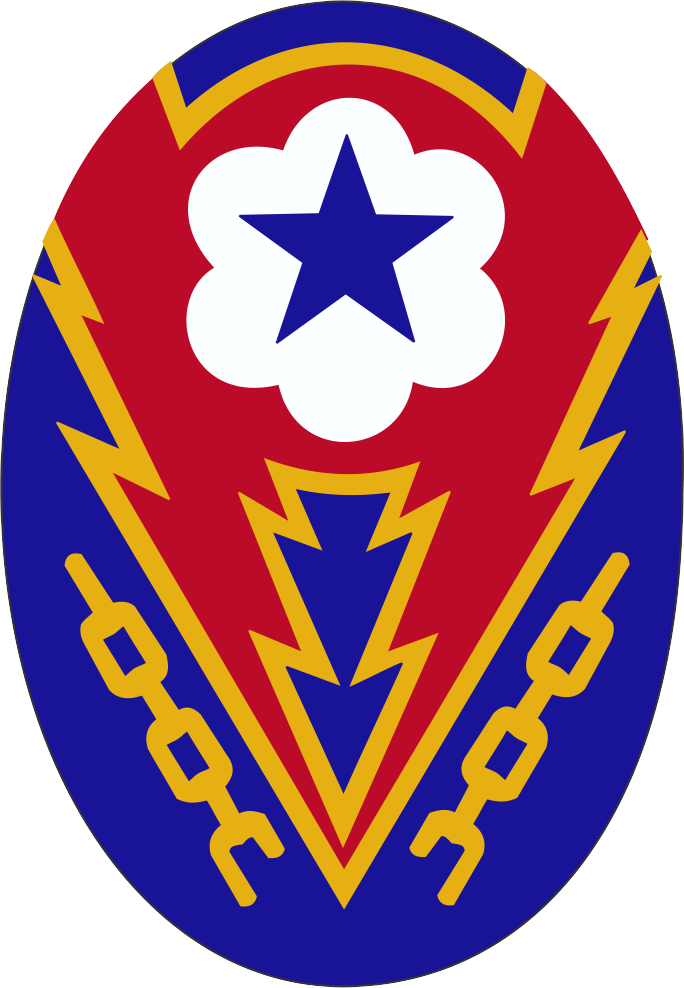
ADSEC Shoulder Sleeve Insignia worn by soldiers of the 64th Quartermaster Battalion (Base Depot). The meaning of the patch is the lightning bolt represents the Allies breaking the chains of Nazi oppression. This blue star in white field is the emblem of the Services of Supply organization.

The battalion participated in Operation Overlord in Normandy under the command of LTC Albert Barden. The 64th Quartermaster Battalion (Base Depot) was the first major sustainment organization to arrive on the beachhead of Normandy, following the axis of advance by pushing classes of supply across the English Channel. For the period from D+41 through D+90, ADSEC had requisitioned enough spare parts to maintain a 30-day level in each using unit and an additional 30-day supply in the army Class II depot. Quartermaster units were to carry a 90-day supply of special-purpose spare parts, which would last until the 64th Quartermaster Battalion (Base Depot) could establish a central parts depot on the European continent. On 13 July 1944 at Isigny-sur-Mer, the battalion was specifically tasked with collecting personal effects and baggage for the safe return to the United States, management of graves registration following the invasion of Normandy, and managing the captured German prisoner of war population. On 29 September 1944, the battalion established a base depot, Q-256, in Reims, in order to conduct salvage operations for the 12th Army Group. It became the largest single salvage installation in the ETO with the purpose of undertaking fifth echelon maintenance and manufacturing projects never contemplated by the War Department. Depot Q-256 was administered by the 64th Quartermaster Battalion (Base Depot) and operated by the 696th QM Salvage Repair Company (Fixed); these two units had been trained together at Lydney, and combined a total of 586 attached service troops or civilian employees, not including employed German prisoners of war, whose numbers swelled twenty times that number. Depot Q-256, with its facilities scattered throughout the city of Reims, received overflow salvage directly from the armies. In addition to routine processing and packaging, the depot conducted a program of manufacturing, remodeling, and improvisation. Scrap materials were used to reinforce paratroop trousers, fabricate Browning Automatic Rifle belts and rocket ammunition pouches, and patch tent-age. Materials ostensibly destined for scrap were converted into other types of end items: old tires were used to make soles for prisoners' shoes, badly torn shirts and raincoats were transformed into wiping rags, aprons, and typewriter covers, and old wool was converted into "shoddy" blankets. Besides the fixed repair activities at Reims salvage depot, twelve mobile repair teams and two technical crews worked out of this installation in answer to calls from the field. Ultimately, Q-256 also had to operate a complete machine shop where motors and other heavy equipment, including QM equipment trailers, were rebuilt, although this was originally a responsibility of Ordnance. Such activities were performed in rented French shops with captured German lathes, presses, and other heavy duty machinery. Sufficient machine tools were available to permit the occasional manufacture of badly needed spare parts such as flame cups for one-burner stoves and rotors for gasoline dispensers. By the end of March 1945 the Reims salvage depot occupied 500,000 square feet of closed space and 350,000 feet of open space; this was more than double the total space set aside for Quartermaster salvage and reclamation in all the U.K. depots as of January 1944. At the close of 1944, the depot had processed nine million items, and in March 1945 it was handling 160,000 pieces per day. Items processed in the United Kingdom shortly after D-day for shipment to the continent were in particularly chaotic condition. During the second half of November 1944, combat units of First Army complained that items arriving in the forward areas marked Class B clothing were not suitable for issue, and also reports from its own field liaison officers that 80 percent of the clothing located at Utah Beach marked Class X was actually combat serviceable and included such scarce items as field jackets. COL Beny Rosaler, chief of the Field Service Division, had a solution: assign the 64th Quartermaster Battalion (Base Depot), which was in Reims at that time, with the task of sorting out the confusion. COL Rosaler commented that "it required highly qualified personnel with good judgment." During the German occupation of Belgium, following the Battle of Belgium, occupying German forces turned Dolhain, Belgium into a wartime production factory for German-made Olympia typewriters for their war effort. Typewriters had become scarce as the war raged on, and the US government had started a domestic campaign to collect old typewriters for use by Allied forces. The Allied advance from Paris to the Rhine led to the liberation of cities in the vicinity of the city of Liege, including Dolhain, and subsequent the German destruction of the town as they retreated across the Rhine. The 64th Quartermaster Battalion (Base Depot) reestablished a base depot in Liege and Dolhain, repaired the heavily damaged typewriter factory in order to have typewriters reproduced, this time for the Allies' war effort.

Initially, ADSEC made use of the famous Red Ball Express to rapidly push supplies following the breakout from the beaches of Normandy until November 1944. On 25 March 1945, four "XYZ express routes" were established; the four XYZ routes extended eastward from Liège, Dueren, Luxembourg, and Nancy to support the 12th Army Group in the final push of the Rhineland Campaign.

Months before V-E Day, Office of the Theater Chief Quartermaster had started to plan the post-hostilities organization of Quartermaster activities. Cherbourg, Liège - including the battalion's base of operations, Reims, and Nancy-Metz were to be closed down as soon as their stocks were exhausted and Paris was to be reduced to a minor issue depot for the rear headquarters. 12th Army Group inactivated in July 1945 following the Rhineland Campaign and defeat of the axis powers. No history exists until the battalion was deactivated on 1 March 1949 at Camp Lee, Virginia.

=== Cold War and Vietnam War ===
1st Logistical Command (now the 1st Theater Sustainment Command) shoulder sleeve insignia for soldiers assigned to the 64th Quartermaster Battalion (Petroleum Operating) during Vietnam.

From 19 September 1950 to 20 October 1953, the 64th Quartermaster Battalion was briefly reactivated in West Germany during heightened tensions during the Cold War but did not see combat in Korea. On 26 March 1963, the battalion was reactivated and redesignated as the 64th Quartermaster Battalion (Petroleum Operations) at Fort Leonard Wood, Missouri. From 15 April 1966 to 28 February 1970, the 64th Quartermaster Battalion (Petroleum Operations) was deployed to Long Binh, Vietnam under the 53rd General Support Group, US Army Support Command Saigon, 1st Logistical Command, United States Army Vietnam. The battalion was tasked organized with the following companies:

1. Headquarters Detachment, 64th Quartermaster Battalion (Assigned)
  1. 47th Transportation Company (Medium Truck) (Petroleum) (Attached)
  2. 223d Supply and Service Company (Direct Support) (Attached)
  3. 512th Quartermaster Company (Petroleum)
  4. 538th Transportation Company (Medium Truck) (Petroleum) (Attached)
  5. 556th Transportation Company (Medium Truck) (Petroleum) (Attached)

The Binh Loi-Tan Son Nhut pipeline operated by the 64th Quartermaster Battalion (Petroleum Operations) supplied more than 190,000,000 gallons of fuel to the Ton Son Nhut areas. During this period the battalion delivered more than 300,000,000 gallons of bulk fuel in tank vehicles and drove more than 7,000,000 miles under adverse and hazardous conditions in support of tactical maneuvers. The battalion had 10 soldiers killed in the four years it was deployed. The members of the unit contributed to the free world struggle against Communist aggression in the Republic of Vietnam. On 8 April 1970, the battalion was deactivated in Vietnam.

=== Post-Vietnam and late Cold War ===
4th Infantry Division shoulder sleeve insignia for all soldiers of the 64th Brigade Support Battalion since 1975.

On 1 December 1975, the battalion was reactivated as the 64th Support Battalion (Forward) and assigned to the Division Support Command (DISCOM), 4th Infantry Division (Mechanized) at Fort Carson, where it began its long association with the 4th Infantry Division. It deployed as a task force, with 550 personnel to Wiesbaden, West Germany, as part of 4th Brigade, 4th Infantry Division (M) or "Brigade 76" in April 1976. This deployment was a task force used as a rapid deployment unit with a mechanized brigade made up of units from Fort Carson all of which were on a rotational assignment basis. When expected cost savings from the use of rotation force failed to materialize, the brigade was permanently reassigned to Europe and served in Germany until its deactivation on 15 September 1984 in Germany.

Quartermaster Professional Bulletin, Summer 1993 - featuring the 64th Brigade Support Battalion's linage and picture of refueling operations of a tank from the 70th Tank Battalion during World War II.

64th Forward Support Battalion featured in Army Logistician, May–June 2001 publication.

On 15 May 1987, the battalion was reactivated as the 64th Forward Support Battalion under the DISCOM, 4th Infantry Division (M) with a support relationship with 3d Brigade, 4th Infantry Division (M). Following the Gulf War, the battalion rotated on a deployment to Kuwait with 3d Brigade in support of Operation INTRINSIC ACTION 95-03, Phase II to deter Saddam Hussein from another invasion of Kuwait. The 64th Forward Support Battalion remained in Fort Carson with 3d Brigade, 4th Infantry Division (M) when the rest of the division (e.g. Headquarters, 4th Infantry Division; 1st Brigade, 2d Brigade, DISCOM, and Aviation Brigade) relocated to Fort Hood, TX in 1995.

=== Global war on terrorism ===
Since the beginning of the global war on terrorism, the battalion has deployed in support of Operation Iraqi Freedom from 2003 to 2004, 2005 to 2006, 2007 to 2009, and 2010 to 2011; Operation Inherent Resolve in 2015; and Operation Spartan Shield in 2019. The battalion only had two soldiers killed throughout all deployments.

Alerted on 19 January 2003, the 4th Infantry Division was scheduled to take part in the Iraq War in the spring of 2003 by spearheading an advance from Turkey into northern Iraq. The Turkish Parliament refused to grant permission for the operation and the division's equipment remained offshore on ships during the buildup for the war. Instead, the 4th Infantry Division or "Task Force Iron Horse" was tasked as a follow-on force to secure the volatile Sunni Triangle. 3d Brigade (Strikers) was tasked with moving along the east side of the Tigris River to seize Samarra. After suppressing the former regime forces and stabilizing the lawlessness, the brigade assisted the 173d Airborne Brigade in Kirkuk. By June 2003, 1st Brigade occupied Tikrit, 2nd Brigade occupied Baqubah, and 3d Brigade occupied Balad and Samarra. Throughout this time, the 64th Brigade Support Battalion began building up Logistical Support Area Anaconda under the command of then-LTC Gustave Perna once the airfield was seized, which became one of the largest logistical complexes throughout the war. In March 2004, the battalion redeployed to home to Fort Carson with 3d Brigade.

On 16 December 2004 in accordance with the transformation of the Army, the 64th Forward Support Battalion was redesignated the 64th Brigade Support Battalion. As part of the modular transformation, assets previously held at division level, but habitually attached a division's brigades during operations were made organic to those brigades. The 64th Brigade Support Battalion was relieved from assignment to DISCOM, 4th Infantry Division and reassigned to the redesignated 3d Heavy Brigade Combat Team, 4th Infantry Division with a direct-support relationship.

From 1 November 2005 to January 2007, the 64th Brigade Support Battalion deployed in Operation Iraqi Freedom. During the deployment, the battalion and 3d Brigade were attached as part of the larger "Task Force Band of Brothers," 101st Airborne Division (Air Assault). The 3rd Brigade Combat Team's mission included training the Iraqi Security Forces, assisting in the rebuilding of the Diyala Province infrastructure, as well as continuing to root out the anti-Iraqi forces that inhabit the region. The 64th Brigade Support Battalion maintained a continuous presence on FOB Warhorse near Baqubah during this deployment.

Within a month of their return to the US, on 19 January 2007, the division began the task of resetting the equipment, retraining the personnel, and preparing for a return to Iraq in late 2007. The battalion deployed once again to Iraq, serving from December 2007 to January 2009 to Sadr City, Baghdad during the height of sectarian violence and the surge. In March 2010, the battalion deployed alongside the brigade to southern Iraq, in the capacity as an Advise and Assist Brigade, which detailed a small number of senior NCOs and officers, and redeploying during the withdrawal of US Forces from Iraq in 2011. During 2012, 3rd Armored Brigade Combat Team sent more than 300 of its officers and senior noncommissioned officers in support of Operation Enduring Freedom; however, the battalion was not directly involved. These 3rd Armored Brigade Combat Team Security Forces Assistance Teams deployed on a mission to the southern provinces of Afghanistan to help mentor and train current Afghan National Security Forces, as one of the first brigades in the Army to be given this mission.

In February 2015, the 3rd ABCT deployed to Southwest Asia in support of U.S. Central Command. During the nine-month deployment, the unit provided combatant commanders a versatile, responsive, and consistently available force to meet requirements across a range of military operations in the region. These military operations included ongoing operational and contingency operations, operational support and theater security cooperation activities, as well as bilateral and multilateral military exercises that extended over 15 countries throughout the region. From February 2019 to November 2019, the 3rd ABCT deployed to Southwest Asia in support of Operation Spartan Shield and Operation Inherent Resolve; conducting the same aforementioned mission in 2015.

=== Operation Atlantic Resolve ===
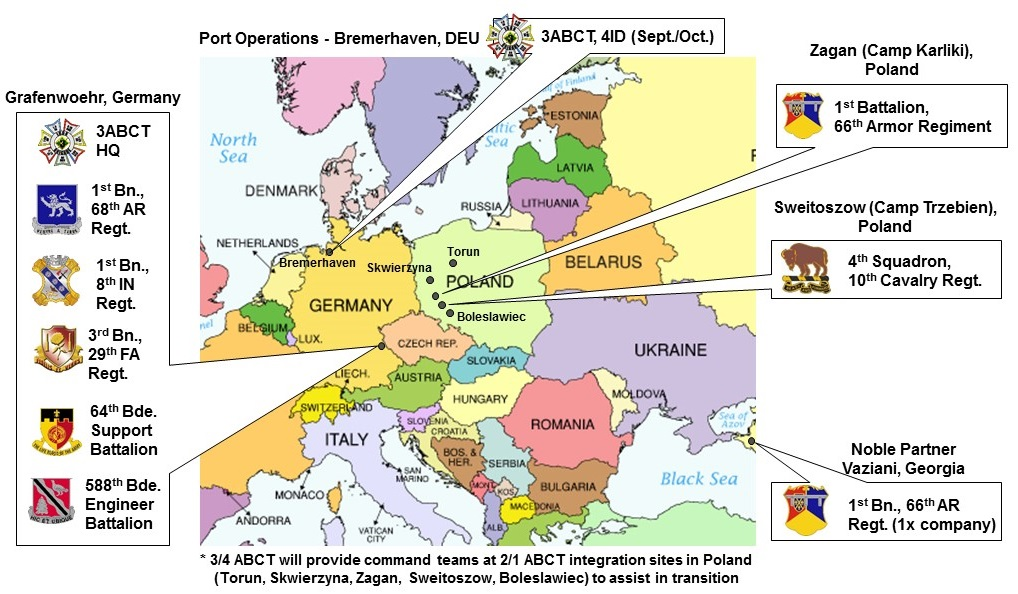
Primary locations for each battalion of the 3d Armored Brigade Combat Team, 4th Infantry Division while deployed. 64th Brigade Support Battalion operated in Grafenwoehr, Germany, but constantly moved around.

The 64th Brigade Support Battalion deployed for the fourth time to Europe, but for the first time in the 21st century, in support of Operation Atlantic Resolve from January to November 2017 in response to renewed Russian aggression in eastern Europe. The battalion provided continuous sustainment support for its parent brigade throughout European continent in support of United States Army Europe and the North Atlantic Treaty Organization (NATO).

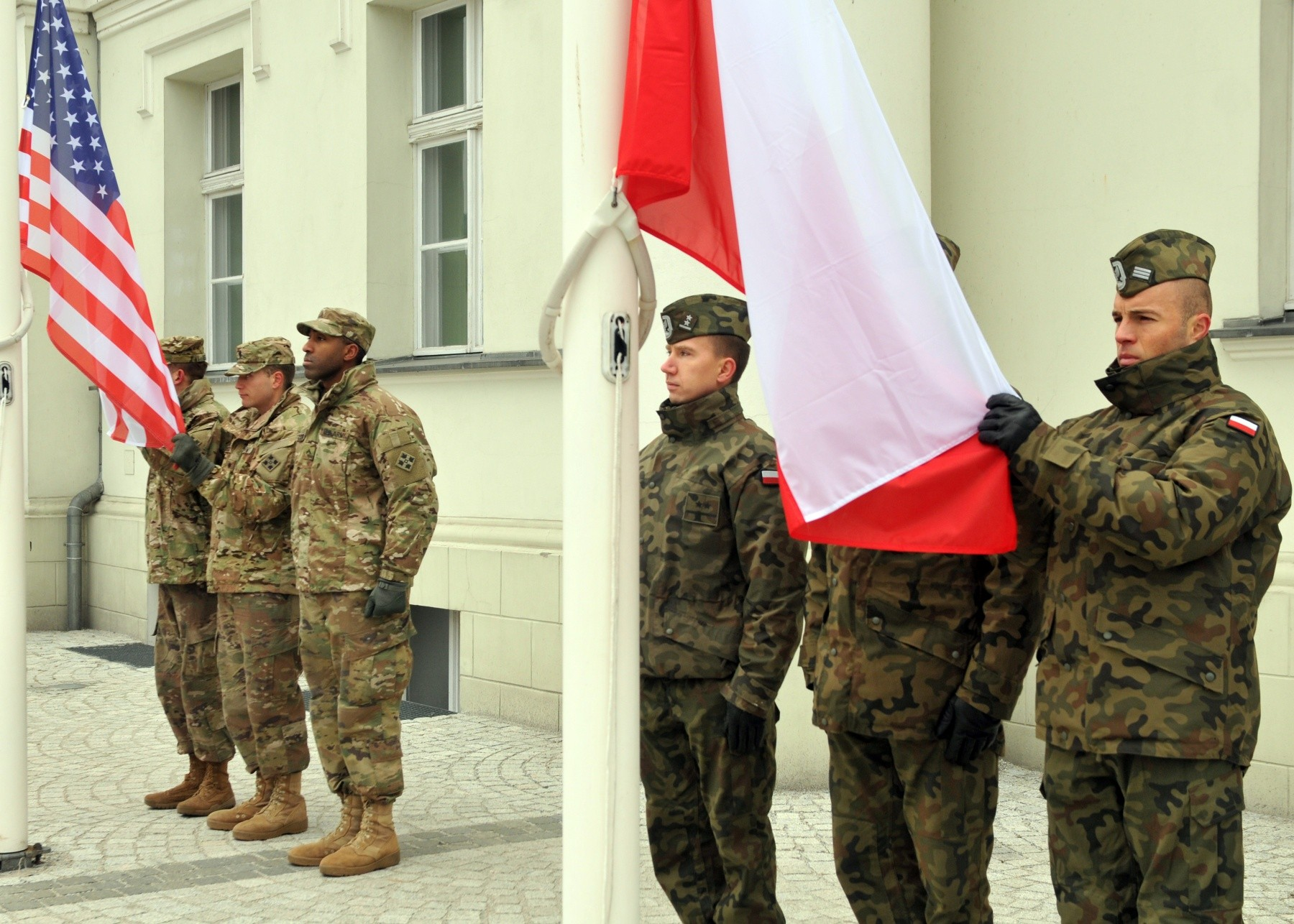
Soldiers of the 64th Brigade Support Battalion and Polish soldiers of the 35th Polish Air Defense Squadron prepare to raise the Polish and U.S. flags during a celebration ceremony welcoming American Forces.

== Heraldry ==
=== Coat of arms ===
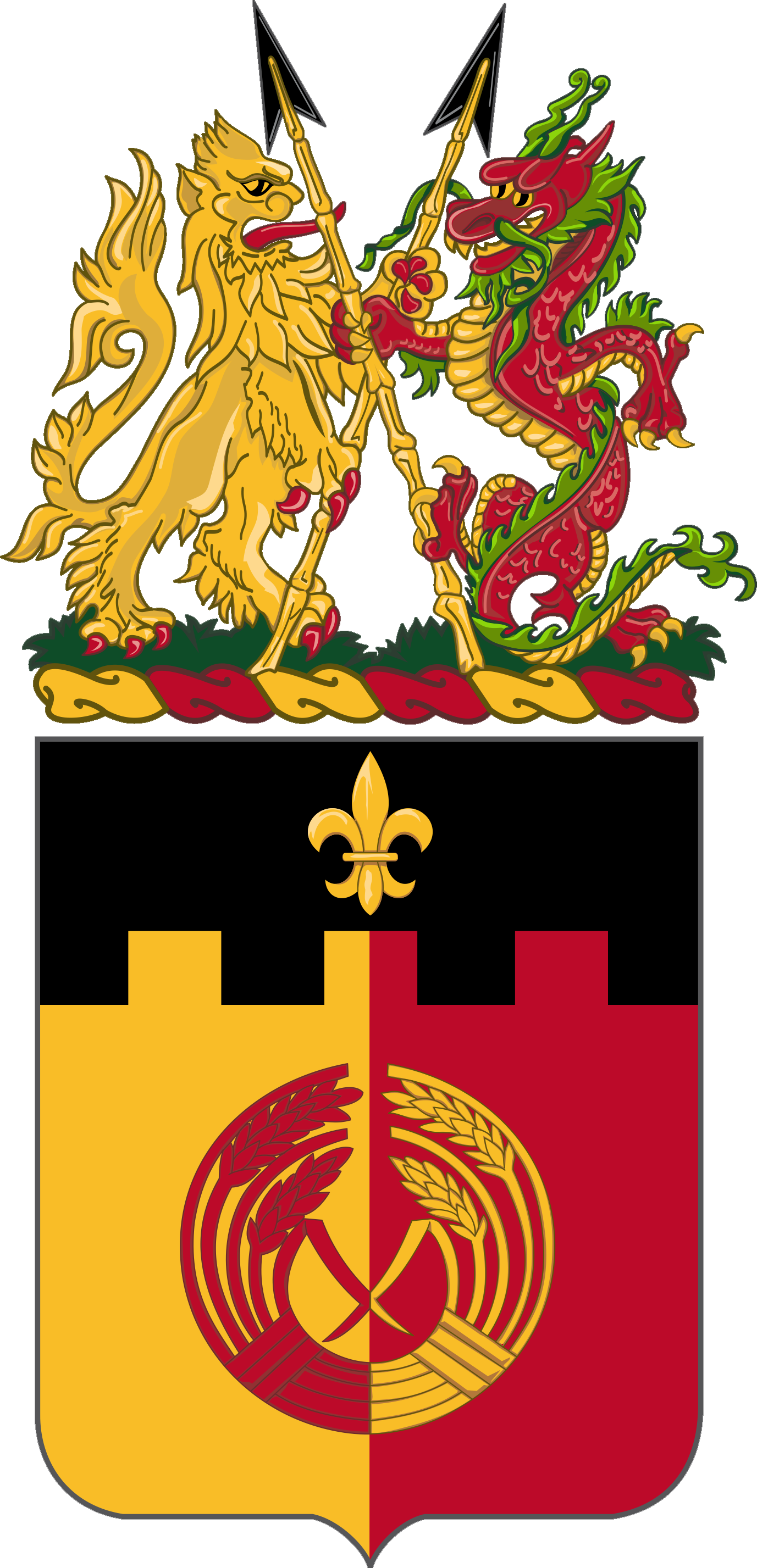
The 64th Brigade Support Battalion's coat of arms.

The coat of arms was approved on 1 December 1975. It was amended to add a crest on 1 March 1990. It was amended to change the blazon of the crest on 16 March 1990.

==== Crest ====
Red, yellow and green are the colors associated with Vietnam. The oriental dragon, a mythological symbol of alertness, readiness, self-defense and protection, denotes the unit’s campaign participation in Vietnam. The dragon is red in allusion to the two Meritorious Unit Commendations awarded the organization. The gold lion, representing strength, courage and determination, refers to the unit’s service in Europe during World War II. The two crossed bamboo spears allude to solidity, support and the unit’s mission. On a wreath of the colors, Or and Gules, two bamboo spears saltirewise proper barbed Sable grasped by a lion rampant Or armed and langued Gules and standing upon a grassy mound Vert and an oriental dragon rampant Gules detailed and armed Or and Vert.

==== Shield ====
Per pale Or and Gules, a wreath of stylized rice counterchange; on a chief embattled of three Sable a fleur-de-lis of the first. Yellow (buff) and scarlet are the colors used for Support units and black refers to the former petroleum capability of the 64th Support Battalion. The fleur-de-lis and the three battlements allude to the three campaigns credited to the organization in France and Europe during World War II and the oriental rice motif symbolizes service in Vietnam. The turned down inner blades of the wreath, crossing diagonally, simulate the Roman numeral X and refer to the participation in then Vietnam campaigns. The two red areas allude to the two Meritorious Unit Commendations awarded the organization during that period.

=== Distinctive unit insignia ===
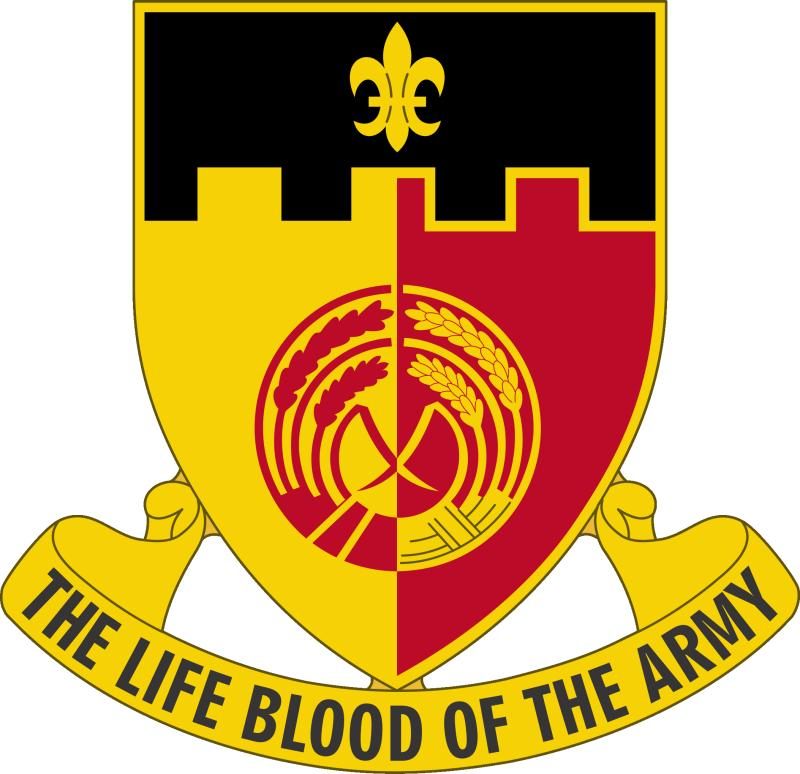
Distinctive unit insignia

The current distinctive unit insignia worn by the soldiers of the battalion was approved on 15 January 1976, replacing a previous design. Black refers to the petroleum capability of the battalion. The fleur-de-lis and the three battlements allude to the three campaigns credited to the battalion in France and Europe in World War II. The original rice motif symbolized service in Vietnam. The turned down inner blades of the wreath, crossing diagonally simulate the Roman numeral X and refer to participation in the ten campaigns in Vietnam. The two red areas allude to the two meritorious unit commendations awarded to the battalion during service in Vietnam.

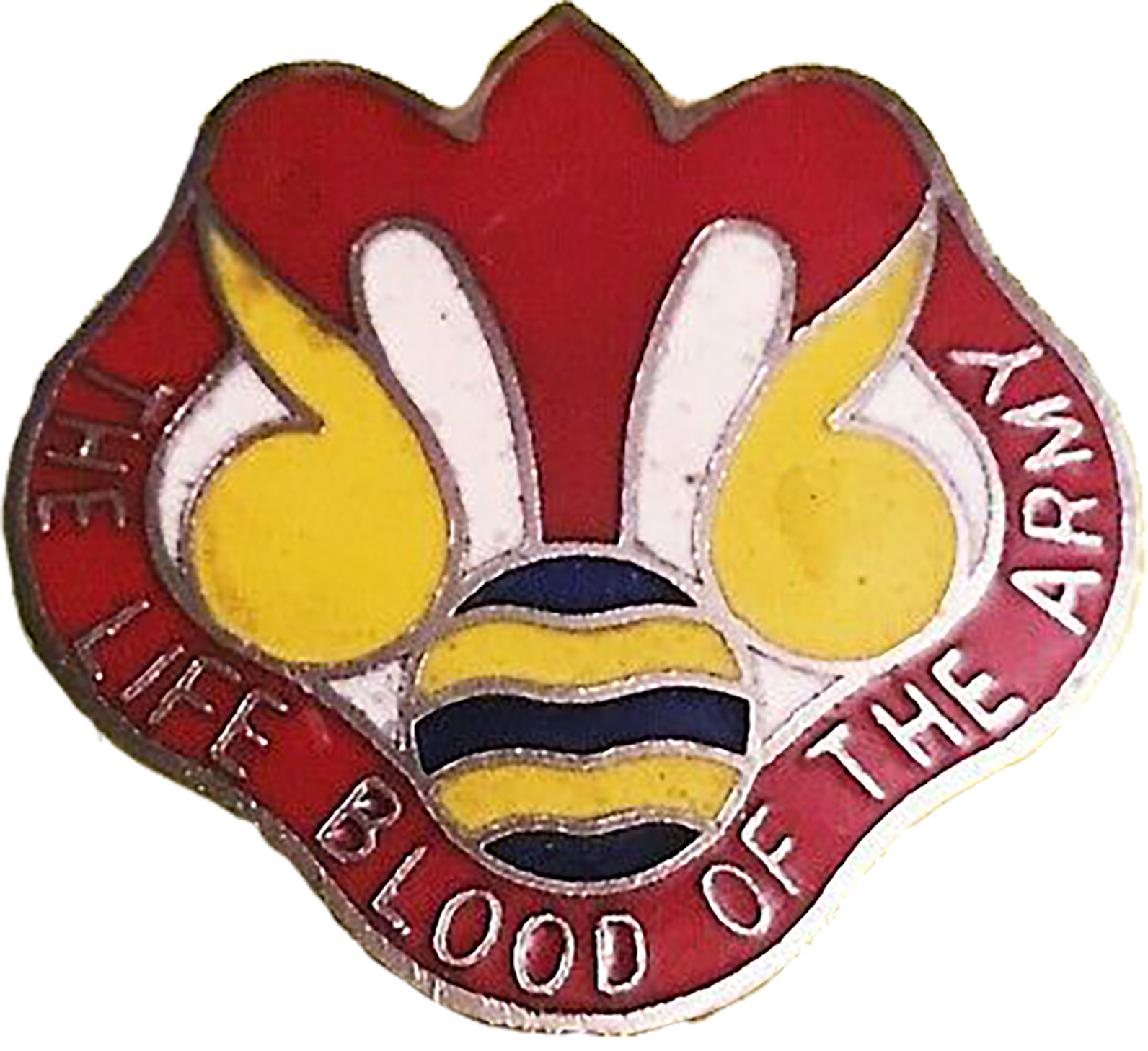
64th Quartermaster Battalion Distinguished Unit Insignia (Pre-1975) from World War II to the Vietnam War.

=== Unit streamers ===
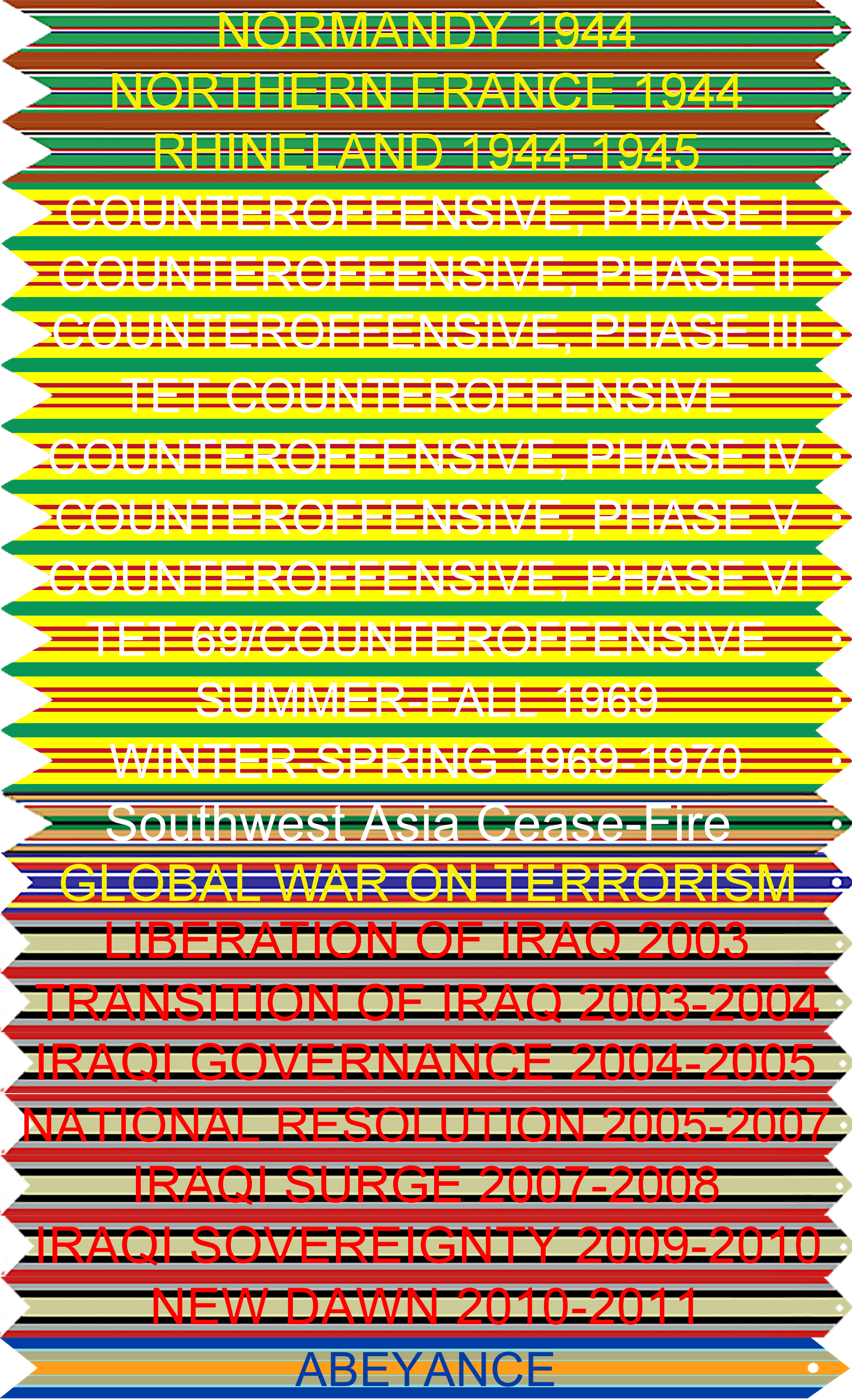
All campaign streamers currently hanging on the battalion colors of the 64th Brigade Support Battalion.

During World War II, the 64th Quartermaster Battalion (Base Depot) earned three campaigns streamers in the WWII - European-African-Middle Eastern Theater:

1. Normandy
2. Northern France
3. Rhineland campaigns

During the Vietnam War, the 64th Quartermaster Battalion (Petroleum Operating) earned 10 campaign streamers in service during Vietnam including:

1. Counteroffensive, Phase I
2. Counteroffensive, Phase II
3. Counteroffensive, Phase III
4. Tet Counteroffensive
5. Counteroffensive, Phase IV
6. Counteroffensive, Phase V
7. Counteroffensive, Phase VI
8. Tet 69/Counteroffensive
9. Summer-Fall, 1969
10. Winter-Spring 1970

During the post-Gulf War period, the 64th Support Battalion (Forward) deployed to Kuwait in support of Operation INTRINSIC ACTION 95-03, Phase II and was awarded the Southwest Asia Service campaign steamer for participating in one campaign:

1. Southwest Asia Cease-Fire

Since the global war on terrorism, the 64th Forward Support Battalion/64th Brigade Support Battalion has been awarded the following campaign streamers for the global war on terrorism, all Iraqi campaigns, and Inherent Resolve:

1. Global war on terrorism (Global War on Terrorism Campaign Streamer)
2. Liberation of Iraq (Iraqi Campaign Streamer)
3. Transition of Iraq (Iraqi Campaign Streamer)
4. Iraqi Governance (Iraqi Campaign Streamer)
5. National Resolution (Iraqi Campaign Streamer)
6. Iraqi Surge (Iraqi Campaigns Streamer)
7. Iraqi Sovereignty (Iraqi Campaigns Streamer)
8. New Dawn (Iraqi Campaigns Streamer)
9. Abeyance (Inherent Resolve Campaign Streamer)

== Unit citations ==
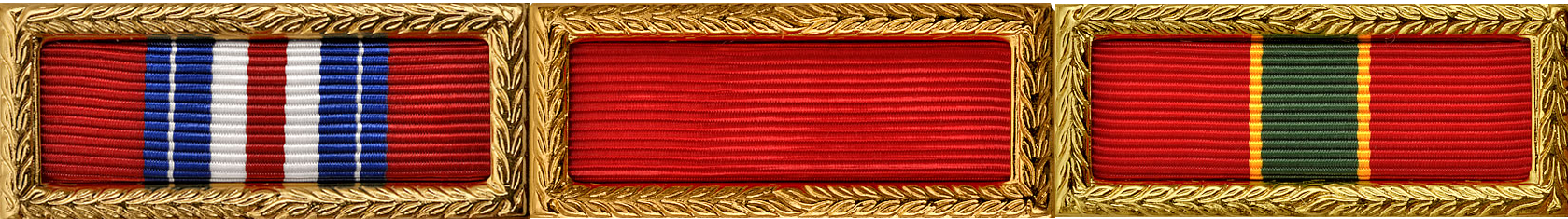
Authorized unit awards rack for wear by all soldiers in the 64th Brigade Support Battalion.

During World War II and Vietnam War, quartermaster battalions were organized as having a Headquarters and Headquarters Detachment, with all other companies were separate attachments. The modern concept of four organic companies and forward support companies did not go into effect until the battalion was reestablished as a forward support battalion in 1975.

All companies of the 64th Brigade Support Battalion are authorized to wear the following unit citations:

1. Valorous Unit Award: 2 December 2007 to 13 February 2009; DA P.O. 138-17
2. Meritorious Unit Commendation: 21 March 2010 to 10 March 2011; DA P.O. 191-03
3. Army Superior Unit Award: 4 January 2017 to 15 October 2017 DA P.O 249-003

The following companies are individually authorized the following unit citations:

1. Headquarters Company: Meritorious Unit Commendation: 10 June 1944 to 27 April 1945; Headquarters, Theater Service Forces G.O. 208, Dated 23 August 1945
2. Headquarters Company: Meritorious Unit Commendation: 15 Apr 1966 to 31 Aug 1968; DA G.O. 28, 69
3. Headquarters Company: Meritorious Unit Commendation: 1 Sep 1968 to 28 Feb 1970; DA G.O. 24, 72 (Currently offline on Army Pub's website)
4. Charlie Company (Medical), 64th Brigade Support Battalion: Valorous Unit Award: 20 April 2003 to 22 March 2004; DA P.O. 2009-32
5. (Golf) Forward Support Company, 3d Battalion, 29th Field Artillery Regiment: 1 December 2005 to 1 November 2006; DA P.O. 079-119
6. (Echo) Forward Support Company, 1st Battalion, 8th Infantry Regiment: Valorous Unit Award: 16 December 2007 to 26 February 2008; DA P.O. 012-17
7. (Fox) Forward Support Company, 1st Battalion, 68th Armor Regiment: Valorous Unit Award: 1 December 2005 to November 2006; DA P.O. 163-04
8. (Fox) Forward Support Company, 1st Battalion, 68th Armor Regiment: Valorous Unit Award: 3 December 2007 to 1 March 2009; DA P.O. 121-19
9. (Delta) Forward Support Company, 4th Squadron, 10th Cavalry Regiment: Valorous Unit Award: 27 March 2008 to 20 May 2008; DA P.O. 186-03
10. (Golf) Forward Support Company, 3d Battalion, 29th Field Artillery Regiment: Valorous Unit Award: 27 March 2008 to 20 May 2008; DA P.O. 186-03

== Distinguished alumni ==
1. GEN Gustave F. Perna, Commanding General of Army Material Command and former Battalion Commander during Operation Iraqi Freedom I
2. MG Robert K. Guest, 43rd Quartermaster School Commandant and former Battalion S3
