= Gustave F. Perna =

United States military officer (born 1960)

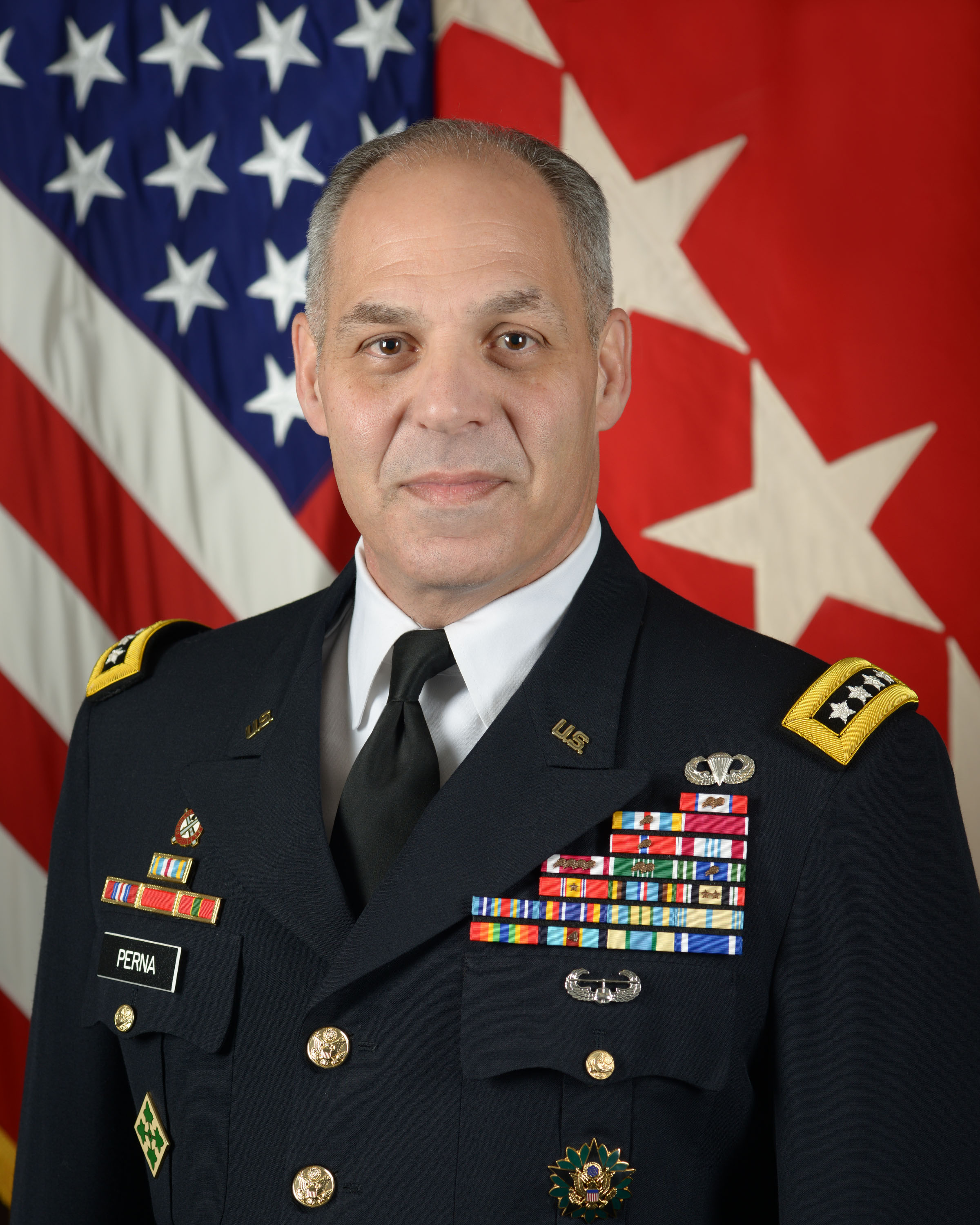
- Perna in 2016
- Born: 5 April 1960 (age 66); Rockaway, New Jersey, U.S.
- Military career
- Allegiance: United States
- Branch: United States Army
- Service years: 1981–2021
- Rank: General
- Commands: United States Army Materiel Command; Joint Munitions Command; Defense Supply Center Philadelphia; 4th Sustainment Brigade; 64th Forward Support Battalion
- Conflicts: Iraq War
- Awards: Defense Distinguished Service Medal; Army Distinguished Service Medal (4); Defense Superior Service Medal (2); Legion of Merit; Bronze Star Medal (2)

Gustave F. Perna (born 15 April 1960) is a retired United States Army four-star general who last served as the chief operating officer of the federal COVID-19 response for vaccine and therapeutics. He previously served as the chief operating officer of Operation Warp Speed from July 2020 until the operation's duties and responsibilities were transferred to the White House COVID-19 Response Team in February 2021. As chief operating officer of COVID-19 response, he oversaw the logistics in the United States federal government's distribution of the vaccine to the COVID-19 pandemic. The Senate confirmed his nomination as chief operating officer on 2 July 2020, and he assumed the office shortly after.

Perna previously served as the 19th commanding general of United States Army Materiel Command from 30 September 2016 to 2 July 2020. He also served for two years as the Army's Deputy Chief of Staff, G-4, overseeing policies and procedures used by all United States Army logistic personnel throughout the world. Prior to joining the Army staff he served for two years as Deputy Chief of Staff, G-3/4, United States Army Materiel Command.

Perna retired from the Army on 2 July 2021 after over 40 years of service.

== Early life and education ==
Born in Rockaway, New Jersey, Perna is a New Jersey native who attended Morris Hills High School, before graduating from Valley Forge Military Academy and College with an associate degree in business administration. Graduating as a Distinguished Military Graduate, he was commissioned as a second lieutenant, infantry officer in 1981 via the Early Commissioning Program from Valley Forge. He earned a bachelor's degree in business management from the University of Maryland and a master's degree in logistics management from the Florida Institute of Technology (1992). His military education includes: Infantry Officer Basic Course, Ordnance Officer Advanced Course, Logistics Executive Development Course, Support Operations Course, Command and General Staff College and Senior Service College.

== Military career ==
Perna's command assignments include:

- Commander, Joint Munitions Command and Joint Munitions and Lethality Lifecycle Management Command, responsible for the lifecycle management of $40 billion of conventional ammunition
- Commander, Defense Supply Center Philadelphia, Defense Logistics Agency, responsible for the procurement of more than $14.5 billion worth of food, clothing, textiles, medicines, medical supplies, construction and equipment items for America's Warfighters and other customers worldwide
- Commander, 4th Sustainment Brigade, where he deployed the brigade to combat operations during Operation Iraqi Freedom 05-07
- Commander, 64th Forward Support Battalion, 3rd Brigade, 4th Infantry Division, Fort Carson, Colorado, where he deployed the battalion to combat operations during Operation Iraqi Freedom I;
- Deputy Commanding Officer, 64th Corps Support Group, 13th Corps Support Command (COSCOM), Fort Hood, Texas
- Commander, B Company, 143rd Ordnance Battalion, Aberdeen Proving Ground, Maryland

Perna's staff assignments include:

- Director of Logistics, J4, U.S. Forces-Iraq, responsible for sustainment plans and policies for strategic and operational logistics to sustain coalition and joint forces
- Executive Officer to the Director of the DLA, supporting the Director's mission of providing Army, Navy, Air Force, Marine Corps and other federal agencies with logistics, acquisitions and technical services support
- Ordnance Branch Chief, Human Resources Command
- Division Support Command (DISCOM) Executive Officer and G4, 1st Cavalry Division, where he deployed to Bosnia
- 544th Maintenance Battalion Support Operations Officer and Battalion Executive Officer, 13th COSCOM
- G4 Maintenance Officer, 13th COSCOM, where he deployed to Somalia as a member of Joint Task Force Support Command

Perna's nomination for promotion to commanding general of the United States Army Materiel Command (AMC) was confirmed by the United States Senate on September 15, 2016. He assumed command on September 30, 2016. In March 2020, his deputy Lieutenant General Edward M. Daly was confirmed as his successor at AMC. In May 2020, Perna was named Chief Operating Officer (COO) of the White House's Operation Warp Speed effort to quickly develop a COVID-19 vaccine. In June 2020, he was nominated to continue serving as an Army general in the position of COO, and was confirmed the next month by the Senate.

== After retirement ==
According to Politico's "National Security Daily" newsletter of 27 October 2022, "Retired Gen. GUSTAVE PERNA will serve as chief operating officer of DEFCON AI, a startup that will bring artificial intelligence to defense logistics."

== Awards and decorations ==
Perna's military awards include:

Basic Parachutist Badge
Air Assault Badge
Army Staff Identification Badge
4th Infantry Division Combat Service Identification Badge
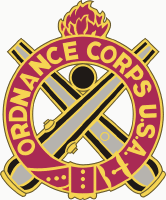
Army Ordnance Corps Distinctive Unit Insignia
5 Overseas Service Bars

Defense Distinguished Service Medal
Army Distinguished Service Medal with three bronze oak leaf clusters
Defense Superior Service Medal with oak leaf cluster
Legion of Merit
Bronze Star Medal with oak leaf cluster
Defense Meritorious Service Medal
Meritorious Service Medal with four oak leaf clusters
Army Commendation Medal with two oak leaf clusters
Army Achievement Medal with oak leaf cluster
Joint Meritorious Unit Award
Valorous Unit Award
Meritorious Unit Commendation
Superior Unit Award
National Defense Service Medal with one bronze service star
Armed Forces Expeditionary Medal
Iraq Campaign Medal with two service stars
Global War on Terrorism Expeditionary Medal
Global War on Terrorism Service Medal
Military Outstanding Volunteer Service Medal
Armed Forces Reserve Medal
Army Service Ribbon
Army Overseas Service Ribbon with bronze award numeral 4
United Nations Medal (for UNOSOM mission in Somalia)
NATO Medal for the former Yugoslavia

Military offices
Preceded by Raymond V. Mason	Deputy Chief of Staff for Logistics of United States Army; 2014–2016	Succeeded by Aundre F. Piggee
Preceded by Dennis L. Via	Commander of United States Army Materiel Command; 2016–2020	Succeeded by Edward M. Daly
New title	Chief Operating Officer, Operation Warp Speed; 2020-2021	Office abolished
New title	Chief Operating Officer, COVID-19 Response for Vaccine and Therapeutics; 2021	Office abolished
