= Google Security Operations =

American cybersecurity company

- Formerly: Google Chronicle Security Operations; Chronicle Security
- Company type: Subsidiary
- Industry: Cybersecurity
- Founded: January 24, 2018; 8 years ago
- Founders: Stephen Gillett; Shapor Naghibzadeh; Mike Wiacek
- Headquarters: Mountain View, California
- Key people: Stephen Gillett (CEO); Shapor Naghibzadeh; Mike Wiacek (CSO); Will Robinson (CTO); Ben Heben (CFO); Jan Kang (CLO); Rick Caccia (CMO)
- Products: VirusTotal; Backstory
- Parent: Alphabet Inc. (2018–2019); Google (2019–present)
- Website: chronicle.security

Google Security Operations (a.k.a. Google SecOps), formerly Google Chronicle Security Operations, is a cybersecurity company which is part of the Google Cloud Platform. It is a cloud service, built as a specialized layer on top of core Google infrastructure, designed for enterprises to privately retain, analyze, and search the massive amounts of security and network telemetry they generate.

While Google Security Operations (formerly Chronicle) is a commercial product offered to external companies, it is built on and utilizes the same core systems and principles that Google uses to secure its own global infrastructure, including its offices and data centers.

== History ==
The company began as a product by X, but became its own company in January 2018. It creates tools for businesses to prevent cybercrime on their platforms. Chronicle announced "Backstory" at RSA 2019 in March, adding log capture and analysis to the family of products that include VirusTotal and UpperCase, which provide threat intelligence (Known Malicious IPs and URLs). Backstory claims to "extract signals from your security telemetry to find threats instantly" by combining log data with threat intelligence.

In June 2019, Thomas Kurian announced that Chronicle would be merged into Google Cloud.

Backstory and VirusTotal are now offered to Google Cloud customers as part of an Autonomic Security Operations solution that also includes Looker and BigQuery.

On April 25, 2024, Google Chronicle Security Operations was rebranded as Google Security Operations.

== See also ==
- Mandiant
