= Liftware =

Medical spoon

Lift Labs Inc.
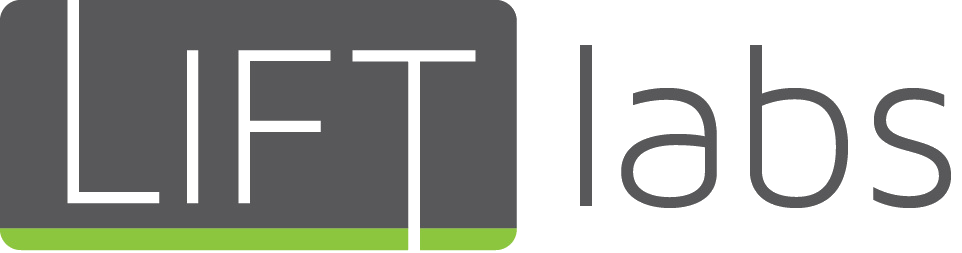
- Founded: January 1, 2010; 16 years ago
- Founder: Anupam Pathak
- Headquarters: San Francisco, CA, US
- Products: Liftware
- Owner: Google (2014–2015); Alphabet Inc. (2015–present)
- Parent: Google (2014–2015); Verily Life Sciences (2015–present)
- Website: liftware.com

Liftware is a brand name for a spoon designed to counteract the tremor associated with medical conditions such as Parkinson's disease or essential tremors. The company which designed the projects, Lift Labs, was founded by Anupam Pathak, a University of Michigan Ph.D. student.

The device works by detecting tremors with an accelerometer then responding to them with an actuator. The product first became available in December 2013.

Lift Labs (which made the Liftware spoon) was acquired by Google in September 2014 for integration into then life sciences division of Google X. Anupam Pathak became the technical lead for the division.

Google launched its version of the spoon in November 2014, priced at $195.
