= Stephen Gillett =

American businessman

- Born: January 20, 1976 (age 50); Los Angeles, California, U.S.
- Occupations: Technology entrepreneur; Adviser
- Title: Chairman, President and Chief Executive Officer of Verily

Stephen Gillett (born January 20, 1976) is an American businessman, entrepreneur and technology leader. He is currently the Chairman and Chief Executive Officer at Verily, formerly Google Life Sciences. He was Chief Executive Officer of Chronicle Security, an Alphabet company born out of X, the moonshot factory and founded in 2016. Gillett is also an active adviser at X (formerly GoogleX).

== Early life and education ==
Gillett was born in Los Angeles, California. He is of Lebanese descent, his father being from Tripoli, Lebanon. Gillett moved to Eugene, Oregon, at middle-school age and later attended the University of Oregon. While there, he was a member of the Oregon Ducks football team and participated in the 1996 Cotton Bowl Classic. Gillett graduated with a bachelor's degree before attending San Francisco State University, where he received his master's in business administration.

== Career ==
=== Corbis ===
In 2006, Gillett joined Corbis, a digital media company founded by Bill Gates, as Chief Information Officer. In that role, Stephen was responsible for global technology, engineering and leading platform efforts for Corbis' e-commerce and multimedia licensing business. Gillett opened a Corbis gallery in the three-dimensional virtual world of Second Life, the online game that has grown to more than 9 million residents since its birth in 2003.

=== Starbucks ===
Gillett was hired in early 2008 as the Chief Information Officer of Starbucks, shortly after Howard Schultz returned as CEO, becoming one of the youngest CIOs of a Fortune 500 company in history, where he was responsible for leading the technological transformation of Starbucks under Howard Schultz. Gillett was responsible for the global technology efforts for the Starbucks transformation and founded the Starbucks Digital Ventures team in 2009, adding the GM duties to his role as CIO. The Starbucks Technology and Digital efforts introduced many new innovations such as free wifi, mobile payments and the Starbucks Digital Network. The journey and role Starbucks Information Technology played in the transformation of the company is documented in the book “Onward: How Starbucks Fought for Its Life without Losing Its Soul”.

=== Best Buy ===
Gillett joined Best Buy in March 2012 as President and EVP of Digital, Marketing and Business Services in Minneapolis, MN. Gillett was an architect of the 2012 transformation plan called Renew Blue shared at the Q4 2012 Investor meeting. Gillett resigned from his role at Best Buy in December 2012 to relocate back to Silicon Valley.

=== Symantec ===
Gillett joined the Board of Directors for Symantec in 2011, and was a member of the audit committee. In 2012, Gillett also joined Symantec as its Chief Operating Officer. Gillett worked on the divestiture of the Veritas business, which concluded in 2015. Gillett departed the company as result of the COO position being retired after the company split. Symantec said Gillett would remain with the company in a non-executive role during a transitional period in 2015.

=== Alphabet and Google ===
In 2015, Gillett joined Google as an executive in residence at Google Ventures (now GV), where he still maintains an active advisory role. Gillett transferred in 2016 to Google X (now X), the moonshot factory. He was CEO of Chronicle, the Alphabet CyberSecurity company, born out of X, the moonshot factory which was acquired into Google Cloud. He is currently the Chairman and CEO of Verily Life Sciences, the Alphabet health tech company headquartered in Dallas, Texas.

== Board of directors ==
Gillett is an independent director on the boards of Dutch Bros (since 2021) and Discord (since 2020).

Previously, Gillett was a member of the board of directors at Symantec from 2011 to 2012, where he served on the audit committee. From 2015 to 2017, he was a board member at Chipotle Mexican Grill, contributing to both the audit and nominating governance committees. Gillett was chairman of the board of Granular Insurance until 2025, when Verily sold the company to Elevance Health.

== Awards and honors ==
In 2006, Gillett was recognized as an innovative Guild Master in World of Warcraft by Wired.

In 2010, the Aspen Institute named Gillett in the 2010 Henry Crown Fellow Program. with fellowship class members Reid Hoffman and Tim Westergren, which is designed to engage the next generation of business people in the challenge of community-spirited leadership.

In 2012, InformationWeek named Gillett the Technology "Chief Of The Year". The same year, Appinions named him as one of the most influential marketing leaders in America.

In 2023, Modern Healthcare nominated Gillett on its “100 Most Influential People in Healthcare” list.

In 2024 and 2025, D Magazine named Gillett one of "The Most Powerful Business Leaders in Dallas-Fort Worth." He was also inducted into the 2024 San Francisco State University Alumni Hall of Fame."

== Personal life ==
Gillett lives with his family in the Dallas-Fort Worth Metroplex. He is an active and longtime player of MMORPGs.

== Books ==
- From Simi Valley to Silicon Valley (2019)
