= Operation Warp Speed =

US program to accelerate COVID-19 vaccine efforts

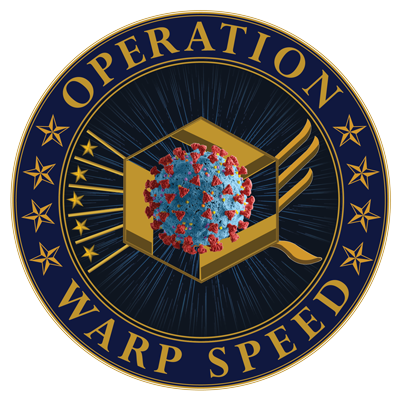
- Official seal of Operation Warp Speed
- Active: May 15, 2020 – February 24, 2021 (285 days)
- Disbanded: Transitioned to White House COVID-19 Response Team
- Country: United States
- Allegiance: United States
- Part of: U.S. Department of Defense; U.S. Department of Health and Human Services; Other various government agencies
- Engagements: Coronavirus disease 2019
- Website: Coronavirus: Operation Warp Speed

Commanders
- Head: Moncef Slaoui
- Chief Operating Officer: General Gustave F. Perna
- Commander in Chief: Donald Trump; Joe Biden

Operation Warp Speed (OWS) was a public–private partnership initiated by the United States government to facilitate and accelerate the development, manufacturing, and distribution of COVID-19 vaccines, therapeutics, and diagnostics. The first news report of Operation Warp Speed was on April 29, 2020, and the program was officially announced on May 15, 2020. It was headed by Moncef Slaoui from May 2020 to January 2021 and by David A. Kessler from January to February 2021. At the end of February 2021, Operation Warp Speed was transferred into the responsibilities of the White House COVID-19 Response Team.

The program promoted mass production of multiple vaccines, and different types of vaccine technologies, based on preliminary evidence. Then there were clinical trials. The plan anticipated that some of these vaccines would not prove safe or effective, making the program more costly than typical vaccine development, but potentially leading to the availability of a viable vaccine several months earlier than typical timelines.

Operation Warp Speed, initially funded with about $10 billion from the CARES Act (Coronavirus Aid, Relief, and Economic Security) passed by the United States Congress on March 27, 2020, was an interagency program that includes components of the Department of Health and Human Services, including the Centers for Disease Control and Prevention, Food and Drug Administration, the National Institutes of Health (NIH), and the Biomedical Advanced Research and Development Authority (BARDA); the Department of Defense; private firms; and other federal agencies, including the Department of Agriculture, the Department of Energy, and the Department of Veterans Affairs.

== History ==
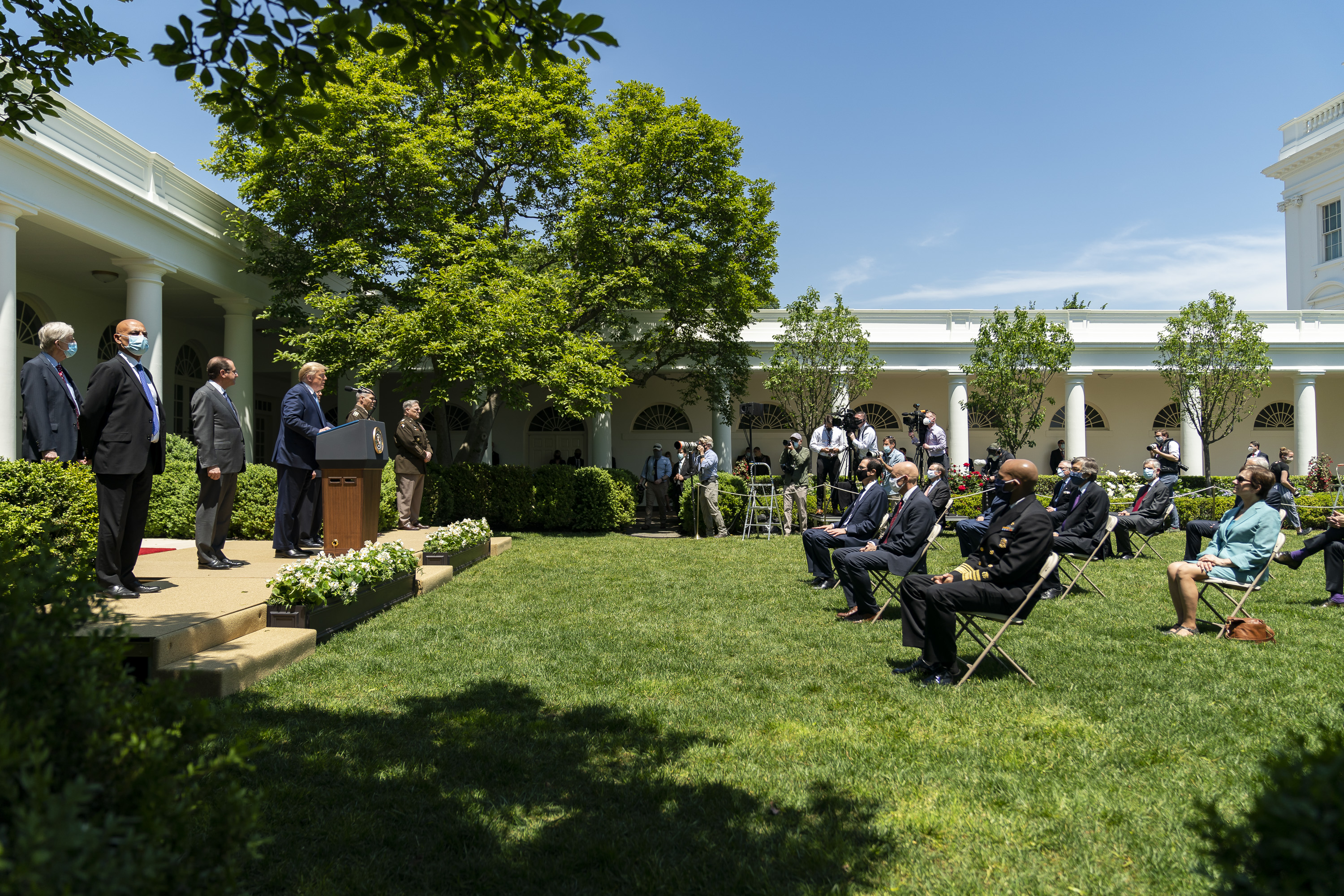
President Donald Trump formally announced Operation Warp Speed on May 15, 2020, in the White House Rose Garden.

In April 2020, Robert Kadlec, Assistant Secretary for Preparedness and Response, worked with Peter Marks (physician), director of the Center for Biologics Evaluation and Research (CBER) at the Food and Drug Administration (FDA) to develop OWS. Kadlec and Marks wrote a proposal for then Secretary of the Department of Health and Human Services (HHS) Alex Azar detailing how Operation Warp Speed would screen potential vaccine candidates and eventually distribute final product to all Americans.

A memo circulated by Kadlec and Marks to Azar on April 12 was the first detailed accounting of OWS’ goals:

"Project Warp Speed
Maximally expediting a safe, effective vaccine
A safe, effective, broadly administered vaccine is the single most important solution to the Covid-19 pandemic
MISSION: Maximally expedite the development of a safe and effective vaccine with sufficient scale to inoculate all Americans who need it
DEADLINE: Enable broad access to the public by October 2020
PLAN: Modeled after the Manhattan Project approach, a multi-disciplinary, multi-sector team that brings the numerous in-flight efforts under a single authority to drive relentless coordination, barrier elimination, and accountability for mission success"

Kadlec was responsible for setting the aggressive deadline of October 2020 to complete simultaneous clinical trials and roll out the vaccine to the American public. Recognizing the national security importance of OWS, Azar and Kadlec also worked to enlist the Department of Defense (DoD) as a key partner in both the science and the logistics.

On May 15, 2020, President Donald Trump officially announced the public-private partnership. The purpose of Operation Warp Speed was to coordinate Health and Human Services-wide efforts, including the NIH ACTIV partnership for vaccine and therapeutic development, the NIH RADx initiative for diagnostic development, and work by BARDA.

Operation Warp Speed was formed to encourage private and public partnerships to enable faster approval and production of vaccines during the COVID-19 pandemic. The name was inspired by terminology for faster-than-light travel used in the Star Trek fictional universe, evoking a sense of rapid progress.

The Food and Drug Administration announced on June 30, 2020, that a vaccine would need to be at least 50% effective for diminishing the severity of COVID-19 symptoms to obtain regulatory and marketing approval.

In January 2021, White House press secretary Jen Psaki announced that the program was expected to undergo a restructure and renaming under the Biden administration. Also in January 2021, Dr. Moncef Slaoui, former Operation Warp Speed lead, was told not to use the name Operation Warp Speed anymore. At the end of February 2021, responsibilities of Operation Warp Speed were transferred into the White House COVID-19 Response Team.

== Goals ==
According to the Department of Health and Human Services' fact sheet, the main stated goal of Operation Warp Speed was to "produce and deliver 300 million doses of safe and effective vaccines with the initial doses available by January 2021, as part of a broader strategy to accelerate the development, manufacturing, and distribution of COVID-19 vaccines, therapeutics, and diagnostics".

Specific targets, as outlined in various media, include:

- support pharmaceutical companies for R&D of seven different vaccine candidates simultaneously and certain therapeutic compounds
- support several vaccine manufacturers for rapid scale-up of manufacturing capacity
- support organization and facilitate simultaneous FDA review of Phase I-III clinical trials on several of the most promising vaccine candidates
- facilitate manufacturing vaccine candidates while they remain pre-approved during prefinal clinical research to prepare for rapid deployment, if proven to be safe and effective
- coordinate with the Department of Defense for vaccine supply, production, and deployment around the United States, and track every vaccine vial and the injection schedule for each American receiving a vaccination

While coordination was expected with the FDA on technical matters, Commissioner Stephen Hahn noted that the FDA would "provide technical and development assistance to Operation Warp Speed, but the manufacturers decide if they're going to go forward or not" and clarified that the agency had "drawn a very bright line at FDA between us and Operation Warp Speed because we're the independent regulator".

== Budget and leadership ==
Operation Warp Speed used BARDA as the financial interface between the U.S. federal government and the biomedical industry. The program was initially being funded with $10 billion, with additional funds allocated through BARDA. Funding was increased to about $18 billion by October 2020.

Rick Bright, the BARDA director, was reassigned on or about April 22, 2020, following his resistance to (as he phrased it) "efforts to fund potentially dangerous drugs promoted by those with political connections". In May, new leadership was announced. Moncef Slaoui was named Operation Warp Speed's chief adviser. Slaoui is a vaccine researcher and, formerly, Chairman of Global Research and Development and Chairman of Global Vaccines at GlaxoSmithKline, where he led the development of five vaccines. General Gustave F. Perna, who served as commanding general of Army Materiel Command, was named Operation Warp Speed chief operating officer. Retired Lieutenant General Paul A. Ostrowski, who previously served as director of the Army Acquisition Corps, was the director of supply, production and distribution. Army Major General Christopher J. Sharpsten was the deputy director.

Alex Azar, Mark Esper, Jared Kushner and Adam Boehler were on the board of directors of OWS, while Deborah Birx, Tony Fauci, Francis Collins, and Robert Redfield were nonvoting advisers.

== Companies receiving funding ==
As of August 2020, eight companies were chosen for funding of some $11 billion to expedite development and preparation for manufacturing their respective vaccine candidates.

The vaccine developers, different vaccine technologies, and treatments receiving government research funding were:

Name	Technology	Amount	Date announced	Vaccine candidate	Date FDA authorized	Notes
Johnson & Johnson (Janssen Pharmaceutical)	Non-replicating viral vector	$1 billion	August 5, 2020	Ad26.COV2-S	February 28, 2021	This funding is in addition to $456 million the government awarded in March 2020. FDA authorized emergency use only.
AstraZeneca–University of Oxford and Vaccitech	Modified chimpanzee adenovirus viral vector	Up to $1.2 billion	May 21, 2020	AZD1222	No FDA authorization.	First authorized December 20, 2020, in the United Kingdom. In March 2021, a number of countries paused use of the vaccine out of fears it may be implicated in cases of blood clotting observed in vaccine recipients.
Moderna	mRNA	$1.53 billion	August 11, 2020	mRNA-1273	December 18, 2020	The government had already given Moderna two grants of $483 million and $472 million. The $1.53 billion announced on August 11 brought the total investment to $2.48 billion. FDA authorized emergency use only.
Novavax	SARS-CoV-2 recombinant spike protein nanoparticle with adjuvant	$1.6 billion for advance commercial-scale manufacturing	July 7, 2020	NVX‑CoV2373		Funding to demonstrate commercial-scale manufacturing; federal government will own the 100 million doses produced, but will be made available for clinical trials
Merck and IAVI	Antiviral drug research and immune response therapy	$38 million	April 15, 2020			Two vaccine projects terminated by Merck, January 25, 2021
Sanofi and GlaxoSmithKline	Protein (insect cell lines) with adjuvant	$2.1 billion	July 31, 2020	VAT00008		On December 11, 2020, the companies announced that they would delay the vaccine's release until late 2021 because it produced "insufficient immune response" in elderly people.

Indirectly funded companies include:

- Inovio

As of October 2020, Operation Warp Speed had spent less than $1 billion to support the development and manufacturing of three monoclonal antibody treatments, versus almost $10 billion on six vaccines.

- Regeneron was to receive $450 million to develop and supply a monoclonal antibody drug, according to a government announcement on July 7, 2020.

== Pfizer–BioNTech ==
The BioNtech project to develop a novel mRNA technology for a COVID-19 vaccine was called "Project Lightspeed", which started in mid-January 2020 at BioNTech's laboratories in Mainz, Germany, just days after the SARS-Cov-2 genetic sequence was first made public. In September 2020, BioNTech received €375 million (US$445 million) from the government of Germany to accelerate the development and production capacity of the Pfizer–BioNTech COVID-19 vaccine. On November 9, the Pfizer–BioNTech partnership announced positive early results from its Phase III trial of the BNT162b2 vaccine candidate, and on December 11, the FDA provided emergency use authorization, initiating the distribution of the vaccine. Pfizer CEO Albert Bourla said that the company had not taken Warp Speed funding for the development of the vaccine out of a desire "to liberate our scientists [from] any bureaucracy that comes with having to give reports and agree how we are going to spend the money in parallel or together".

On July 22, 2020, the U.S. government placed a conditional advance-purchase order of $2 billion with Pfizer to manufacture 100 million doses of a COVID-19 vaccine, with an option for 500 million more, for use in the United States if the vaccine was shown to be safe, effective, licensed, and authorized by the Food and Drug Administration (FDA). On December 23, 2020, the Trump administration announced that they had ordered another 100 million doses from Pfizer.

After Pfizer-BioNTech's November 9 announcement, Vice President Mike Pence wrote in a tweet that credit belonged to the "public-private partnership forged by" Trump. Pfizer's head of vaccine and research and development, Kathrin Jansen, had said on November 8 that they "were never part of the Warp Speed"; a day later, a company spokeswoman said that the company was "part of Operation Warp Speed as a supplier of a potential coronavirus vaccine". As reported by Peter Baker in his book on Trump, Albert Bourla of Pfizer stated: "He (Bourla) had launched his own company's Project Lightspeed nearly two months before Operation Warp Speed got underway and he was not about to allow his vaccine to be politicized... Bourla rallied his counterparts at eight other drug companies to issue a joint public pledge in 14 newspapers on September 8 vowing to 'only submit for approval' any new vaccines 'after demonstrating safety and efficacy'. They would not be rushed by a president seeking to salvage his flailing election hopes".

Experts disagreed whether the U.S. government's conditional advance order "played an important role in expediting Pfizer’s vaccine development process". The United Kingdom was the first country to authorize the vaccine on an emergency basis on December 2, 2020. Emergency use authorization in the United States was issued December 11, 2020.

== Distribution ==
Vaccine doses purchased by Operation Warp Speed were sent from manufacturers via UPS and FedEx to locations specified by state governments. The Federal Pharmacy Partnership delivers doses to CVS and Walgreens locations, which then send pharmacists for mass vaccinations at care facilities like nursing homes.

In October 2020, Alex Azar, at that time the United States Secretary of Health and Human Services, predicted a hundred million available doses by the end of the year. The Trump administration later reduced the goal to twenty million doses. As of January 6, 2021, the CDC was reporting 17,288,950 doses distributed, but only 5,306,797 actually administered to a person. Of those, 3,416,875 were distributed and 511,635 administered through the Federal Pharmacy Partnership. General Gustave Perna said reporting delays cause the administration numbers to lag by 72 to 96 hours. By January 31, 2021, when Operation Warp Speed was being transferred to the Biden Administration, 63.7 million doses had been delivered of a total of 200 million doses that Pfizer and Moderna were contracted to provide by the end of March 2021.

The distribution effort was criticized for lack of coordination between federal and state governments, and lack of timely federal funding for mass vaccination campaigns. Other reasons cited included the Christmas holiday, employees declining to be vaccinated, a longer than typical time spent on paperwork or answering patient questions, the required observation time, and shortage of trained staff.

== Reception ==
=== Cost ===
Although initially budgeted by Congress for about $10 billion in May 2020, Operation Warp Speed had spent $12.4 billion by mid-December on vaccine developers for the combined costs of R&D and pre-approval manufacturing for millions of vaccine doses.

Operation Warp Speed anticipated that some of these vaccines would not prove safe or effective, making the program more costly than typical vaccine development, but potentially leading to the availability of a viable vaccine several months earlier than typical timelines. Government subsidies allowed the COVID-19 vaccines to be distributed with initial pricing similar to that of the annual influenza vaccine.

=== Timeline ===
The goals of the project – to develop, manufacture, and distribute hundreds of millions of COVID-19 vaccine doses by the end of 2020 – were initially criticized as being unrealistic, based on decades of experience in developing viral infection vaccines which normally require years or decades for assuring the chosen vaccine will not be toxic and have adequate efficacy.

Most viral infections do not have vaccines because the vaccine technology failed in early-stage clinical trials. Despite extensive previous research attempts to produce safe, effective vaccines against coronaviruses, such as SARS and MERS, all vaccine candidates for coronavirus infections have failed during clinical research, and no vaccine existed to prevent any coronavirus infection. To prepare for manufacturing and distribution, Operation Warp Speed expended resources and financing before the safety and efficacy results of vaccine candidates were known.

In the case of Operation Warp Speed, effective vaccines made by BioNTech in Germany and Pfizer and Moderna were given an emergency use authorization by the FDA in December 2020. Pfizer joined the Warp Speed program in July 2020, and signed a $1.95 billion contract to be paid out when the vaccine would be FDA approved, and included an initial order of 100 million vaccines. In December 2020, the Trump administration ordered 200 million additional vaccines from Pfizer.

==== Conclusion ====
At the end of February 2021, Operation Warp Speed transitioned into the White House COVID-19 Response Team under the Biden Administration.

=== Competition ===
There was potential that the Warp Speed project would expend effort and funding in direct competition with publicly traded American vaccine companies already fully engaged and financed for development. There was also the possibility that a billion dollars or more of U.S. taxpayer money would be expended on only American efforts or a narrow alternate choice, such as investing in one other vaccine platform – the University of Oxford-AstraZeneca candidate for which the U.S. already paid US$1 billion in May 2020 to receive 300 million doses for American use, when the AstraZeneca vaccine was successful in advancing to proof of safety and efficacy beyond its status as an early-stage Phase I–II trial in May.

Warp Speed did not partner with Chinese vaccine development organizations, or with the World Health Organization (WHO), the Coalition for Epidemic Preparedness Innovations, or the European Commission, which are coordinating and financing international programs for multiple vaccine development, having raised $8 billion together from international partners on May 4 for a Coronavirus Global Response. The U.S. government chose not to include Operation Warp Speed as part of the international Solidarity trial on vaccine development, organized by the WHO.

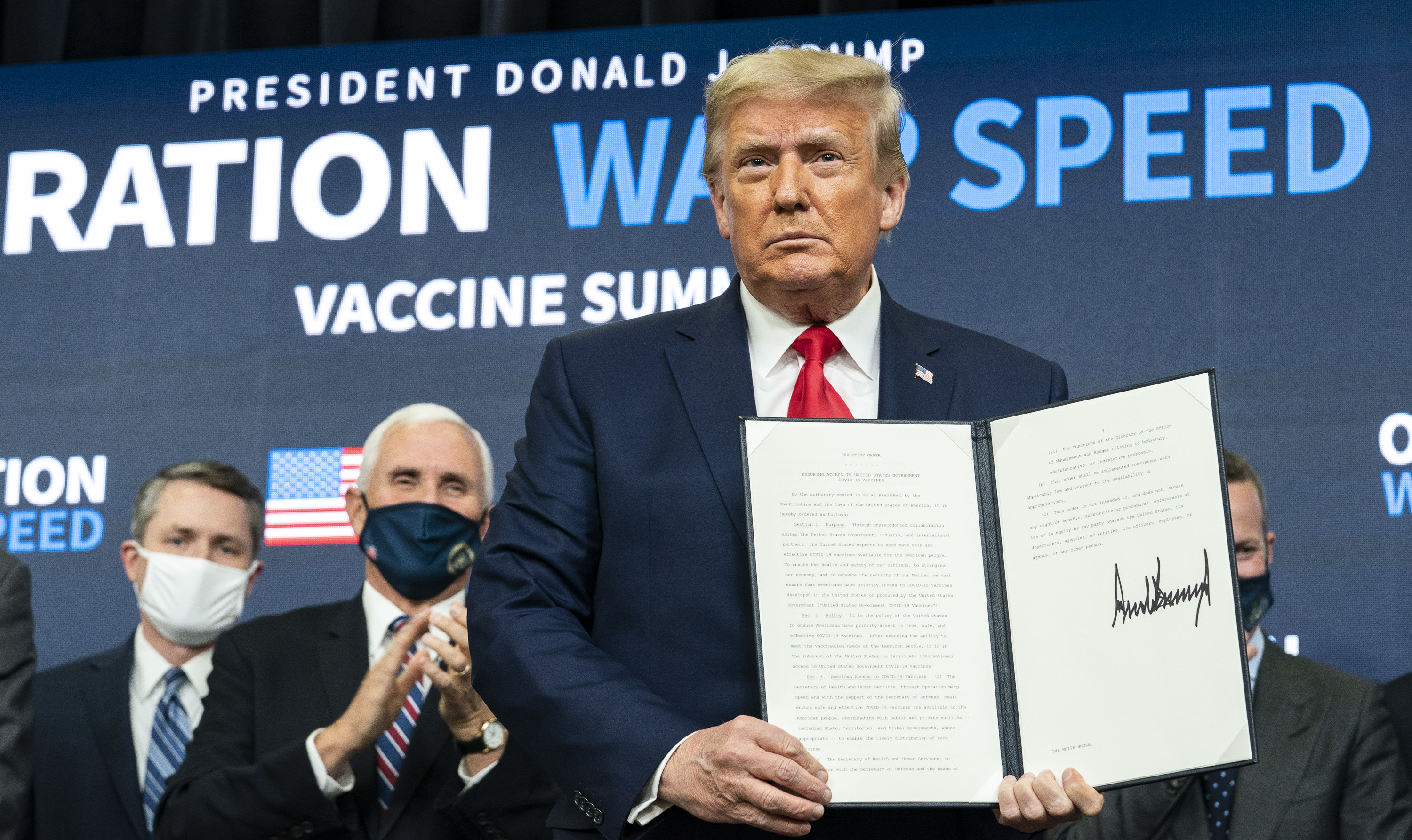
Trump displays Executive Order 13962, which requires priority access to COVID-19 vaccines developed in the United States, signed December 8, 2020.

On December 8, 2020, Trump signed an executive order mandating that companies sell vaccine to the US before selling to any other countries (even if they already had contracts with other countries).

=== Concern for equitable access ===
The focus of Operation Warp Speed to deploy approved COVID-19 vaccines first for the American people raised ethical and logistical concerns that access to vaccines outside of the United States may be restricted during 2021, leaving low-to-middle-income countries with no or minimal supply. Concerns were elevated when the Trump administration withdrew its financial support for the WHO and COVAX, and whether the program would participate in international vaccination practices, optimization, and education against vaccine hesitancy and misinformation. In February 2021 after Operation Warp Speed was transitioned to the White House COVID-19 Response Team, the United States pledged to donate any vaccine surplus out of concern for vaccine-poor regions, such as Africa.

=== Vaccine hesitancy ===
There was concern that the name and intended shortened timeline of Operation Warp Speed could encourage vaccine hesitancy, with one expert stating that "some of the language coming out of the White House is very damaging" because one argument of anti-vaccinators is that products are rushed to market without adequate testing. Failure of the public to have confidence in a new vaccine and refuse vaccination is a global health concern, which increases the risk of further viral spreading that could lead to ongoing COVID-19 outbreaks during 2020–21. A September 2020 survey found that half of American adults surveyed said they would not accept a vaccination if it was available at that time, and three-quarters expressed concerns about the pace of the process and fears that a vaccine might be confirmed before its safety and effectiveness are fully understood.

=== Leader neutrality ===
The leader of the Operation Warp Speed project, Moncef Slaoui, had been a board member of the U.S. vaccine developer, Moderna, and divested his shares in Moderna stock, at a potential personal gain of $10 million, raising questions of his neutrality in judging vaccine candidates. Although Slaoui resigned from the Moderna board when named to head Warp Speed, his share value in Moderna stock increased by $3 million in one day when Moderna announced an advance in vaccine clinical research. At the request of the incoming Biden administration, Slaoui resigned from the project in early January 2021.

=== Lawsuits and insider trading ===
Shareholders sued biotech firm Inovio, claiming the company misled the public when it reported how quickly it had designed the blueprint for its vaccine candidate. A class action lawsuit was filed in August 2020 against Vaxart in Northern California U.S. District Court for alleged securities fraud, a concern related to Vaxart executives enriching themselves by selling shares timed to positive news on vaccine development during mid-2020. Executives, board members, and investment firms holding shares in vaccine and therapeutic companies, including Moderna, Novavax, and Regeneron, took profits worth some US$1 billion (about €830 million) on positive news during 2020.
