= Vx-underground =

Website about malware

vx-underground
- Founded: May 2019
- Website: vx-underground.org

vx-underground, also known as VXUG, is an educational website about malware and cybersecurity. It claims to have the largest online repository of malware. The site was launched in May, 2019 and has grown to host over 35 million pieces of malware samples. On their account on Twitter, VXUG reports on and verifies cybersecurity breaches.

== Reception ==
Kim Crawley compared the site to VirusTotal and states that vx-underground is more susceptible to suspicion for law enforcement.

== Data breach reports ==
In May 2024, the International Baccalaureate organizations faced allegations over supposed breaches in their IT infrastructure after an incident of examination leaks. Upon inspecting leaked data, VXUG were the first to report that the breach seemed legitimate on the morning of May 6.
