= VirusTotal =

Cybersecurity website owned by Google Security Operations

- Website type: Internet security, file and URL analyzer
- Available in: Arabic, Bulgarian, Chinese, Chinese (Hong Kong), Chinese (Taiwan), Croatian, Czech, Danish, Dutch, English (US), English (GB), Estonian, Filipino, Finnish, French, German, Greek, Hebrew, Hindi, Hungarian, Indonesian, Italian, Japanese, Korean, Latvian, Lithuanian, Malay, Norwegian, Persian, Polish, Portuguese, Romanian, Russian, Serbian, Slovak, Slovenian, Spanish, Swedish, Thai, Turkish, Ukrainian, Vietnamese
- Headquarters: Málaga, Spain
- Area served: Worldwide
- Creator: Hispasec Sistemas
- General manager: Bernardo Quintero
- Key people: Bernardo Quintero, Emiliano Martínez, Víctor Manuel Álvarez, Karl Hiramoto, Julio Canto, Alejandro Bermúdez, Juan A. Infantes
- Parent: Google LLC (2012–2018); Chronicle (2018–present)
- Website: www.virustotal.com
- Commercial: No
- Registration: Optional
- Launched: June 2004; 22 years ago
- Current status: Active

VirusTotal is a website created by the Spanish security company Hispasec Sistemas. Launched in June 2004, it was acquired by Google in September 2012. The company's ownership switched in January 2018 to Google Security Operations, a subsidiary of Google.

VirusTotal operates by multiscanning. It aggregates many antivirus products and online scan engines called Contributors. In November 2018, the Cyber National Mission Force, a unit subordinate to the U.S. Cyber Command became a Contributor. The aggregated data from these Contributors allows a user to check for viruses that the user's own antivirus software may have missed, or verify against any false positives. Files up to 650 MB can be uploaded to the website, or up to 32 MB sent via email. Antivirus software vendors can receive copies of files that were flagged by other scans, but passed by their own engine, to help improve the software and, by extension, VirusTotal's own capability. Users can also scan any suspect URLs and search through the VirusTotal dataset. VirusTotal uses the Cuckoo sandbox for dynamic analysis of malware. VirusTotal was selected by PC World as one of the best 100 products of 2007.

In July 2023, VirusTotal issued an apology after one of its staff members unintentionally exposed the private information belonging to 5,600 VirusTotal's customers, including the email addresses of some US Cyber Command, FBI, and NSA employees.

== See also ==
- vx-underground
