= Galvani Bioelectronics =

United Kingdom company

- Company type: Subsidiary
- Industry: Bioelectronics
- Founded: November 2016
- Founders: GlaxoSmithKline; Verily Life Sciences
- Headquarters: Stevenage, United Kingdom
- Key people: Kristoffer Famm (President)
- Parent: GlaxoSmithKline (55% equity interest)
- Website: galvani.bio

Galvani Bioelectronics is a Stevenage, United Kingdom-based bioelectronics R&D company.

== History ==
It was founded by Alphabet Inc. subsidiary Verily Life Sciences and British pharmaceutical company GlaxoSmithKline (GSK) in November 2016. The partnership to form the company was announced on 1 August 2016.

Verily has a 45% equity interest, while GSK has a 55% equity interest, making GSK the effective owner. The initial agreed upon investment between the two companies is up to £540 million over a period of seven years and will be used "to develop prototype devices aimed at controlling a variety of chronic conditions." Additionally, both companies agreed to contribute their existing intellectual property rights.

In November 2021, a team of laparoscopic surgeons successfully completed the first implantation of a Galvani device in a patient.
