= Verily =

Life sciences research organization

Verily Life Sciences LLC

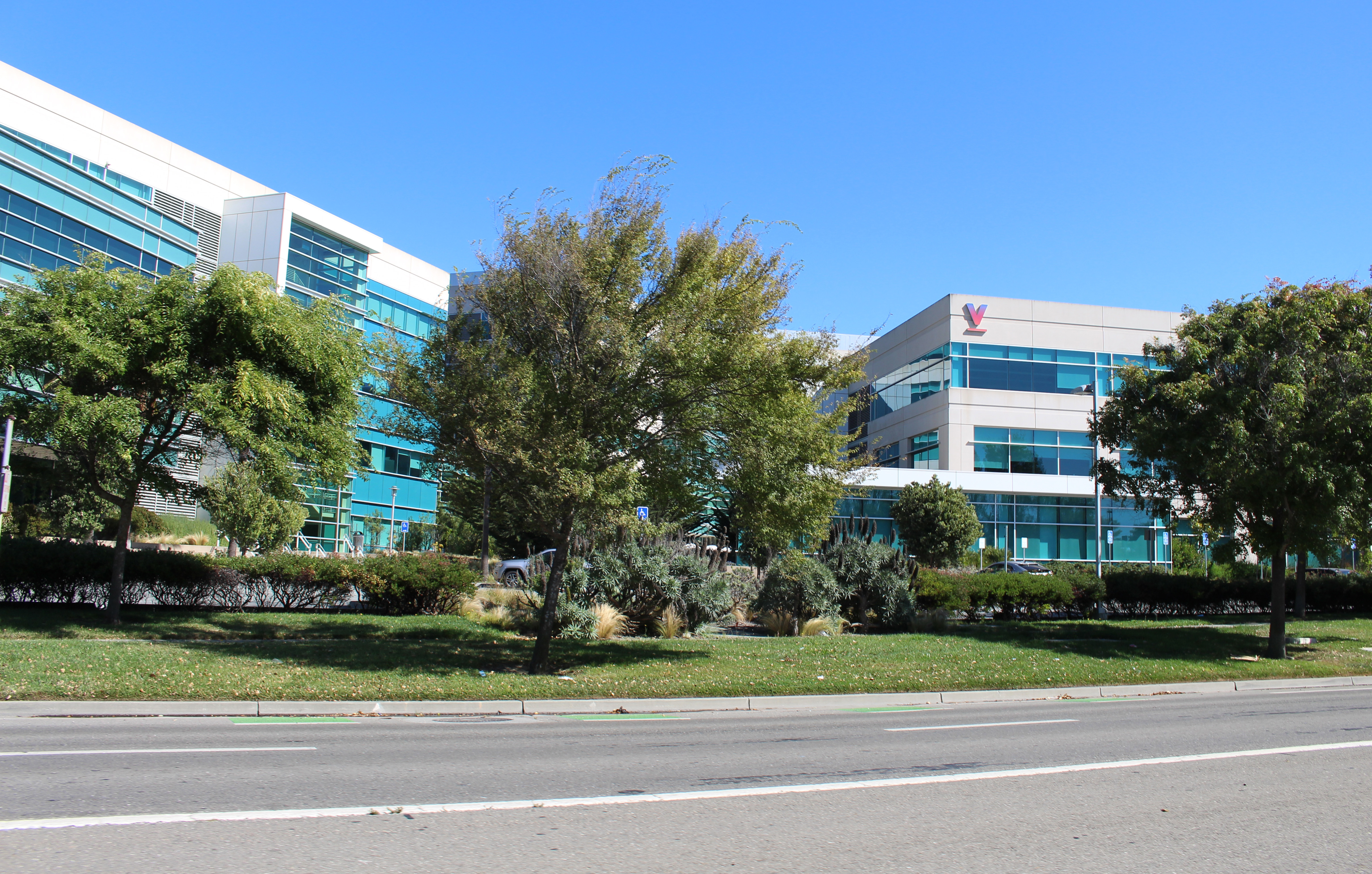
- Former headquarters in South San Francisco, California
- Formerly: Google Life Sciences
- Type: Subsidiary
- Industry: Health care; Biotechnology
- Founded: December 7, 2015; 10 years ago
- Headquarters: Dallas, Texas
- Key people: Stephen Gillett (CEO)
- Revenue: US$559 million (2022)
- Operating income: −US$568 million (2022)
- Owner: Google Inc. (until 2015); Alphabet Inc. (2015–present)
- Number of employees: c. 1,100 (2023)
- Parent: Alphabet Inc.
- Subsidiaries: Lift Labs
- Website: verily.com

Verily Life Sciences LLC also known as Verily (formerly Google Life Sciences), is Alphabet Inc.'s research organization devoted to the study of life sciences. The organization was formerly a division of Google X, and as of December 2024, is operating as a standalone company under Alphabet.

== History ==
On 9 September 2014, the then-Google X division Google Life Sciences acquired Lift Labs, the makers of Liftware.

On August 10, 2015, Sergey Brin announced that the organization would become an independent subsidiary of Alphabet Inc. On December 7, 2015, Google Life Sciences was renamed Verily.

Verily Life Sciences in January 2019 raised $1 billion in funding.

At the end of 2019, Verily sold its stake in robot-assisted surgery joint venture Verb Surgical to development partner Johnson & Johnson.

In August 2020, Verily announced that it is entering into the insurance market with the launch of Coefficient Insurance Company. The new subsidiary will be backed by Swiss Re Group's commercial insurance unit.

In August 2021, Verily acquired SignalPath.

In October 2022, the first patient was screened for diabetic retinopathy at the Baton Rouge Clinic using Verily Retinal Service.

In September 2022, Verily announced longtime CEO Andy Conrad would step down as CEO in January 2023, to be replaced by Stephen Gillett who became CEO on January 3, 2023.

In January 2023, fifteen percent of Verily's workforce was laid off as part of a broader restructuring by parent company, Alphabet. The Information reported in August that Gillett had told employees they would stop relying on Alphabet on "a wide range of corporate services", signaling a potential spin-out as an independent company.

In October 2023, the Centers for Disease Control and Prevention selected Verily to support the agency's National Wastewater Surveillance System.

In June 2024, Verily decided to close its operations in Israel three years after opening a research and development center in the country. Verily staff in Israel are expected to leave by the third quarter of 2024. The company cited an effort to refocus its strategy on core products and projects as the reason for the closure.

In August 2024, Verily moved its headquarters from South San Francisco to Dallas citing significant investment and involvement in the Texas healthcare and technology sectors. As of December 2024, Verily is acting as a standalone company under Alphabet.

In September 2024, Verily expanded its wastewater testing services to Europe through a partnership with Bangor University in Wales.

In October 2024, a Verily-led data and technology consortium received a $4.8M award from the National Institutes of Health.

In January 2025, Verily signed an agreement to sell its stop-loss insurance unit, Granular (formerly known as Coefficient), to Elevance.

=== Potential spinoff ===
Reuters reported in August 2023 that Alphabet spinning off Verily was seen as possible after Verily CEO Stephen Gillett announced it would end ties to several of Alphabet's services. In October 2025, Google executive Heather Adkins stated that the company is in the process of selling or spinning off Verily.

== Projects ==
- The Dexcom G7 continuous glucose monitors (CGM), developed in partnership with Dexcom, was FDA approved and launched worldwide in 2022.
- Galvani Bioelectronics, treating chronic conditions, including Rheumatoid Arthritis (RA), through targeted neuromodulation therapies, a joint venture with GlaxoSmithKline
- Verb Surgical, for advancements in surgical robotics, a joint venture with Johnson & Johnson.
- A spoon for people with tremors as part of Lift Labs acquisition.
- The Baseline Study, a project to collect genetic, molecular, and wearable device information from enough people to create a picture of what a healthy human should be.
- Onduo, a chronic disease management platform for patient with Diabetes, developed in partnership with Sanofi.
- Study Watch, a health-tracking watch for clinical trials.

=== Discontinued ===
- Contact lenses that allow people with diabetes to continually check their glucose levels using a non-intrusive method. On November 16, 2018, Verily announced it discontinued this project.
- Smart shoes for health tracking and fall detection
- Skin research with L’Oréal
- A disease-detecting nanoparticle platform working with the wristband, a project called Tricorder.

== See also ==
- Calico
- Galvani Bioelectronics
