= Forward support battalion =

A forward support battalion (FSB) was an Army of Excellence combat service support unit designed to support a Brigade.

== Unit ==
In divisions, it was part of the Division Support Command (DISCOM).

It was composed of:

- Headquarters and an A company, which provided command, control, and oversight for the battalion and quartermaster support to the brigade. However, the forward support battalions of armored and mechanized brigades would have a separate Headquarters and Headquarters Detachment (HHD) and A company.
- A B company, which provided maintenance support to the brigade both with 3rd Shop, and Maintenance Support Teams attached to the individual battalions.
- A C company, which provided level II medical support to the brigade.

With the conversion to the modular force, the FSBs were replaced with brigade support battalions (BSBs).

== History ==
The 47th Forward Support Battalion saw service in the Iraq War in May 2008.
