= 4th Sustainment Brigade =

4th Infantry Division Sustainment Brigade
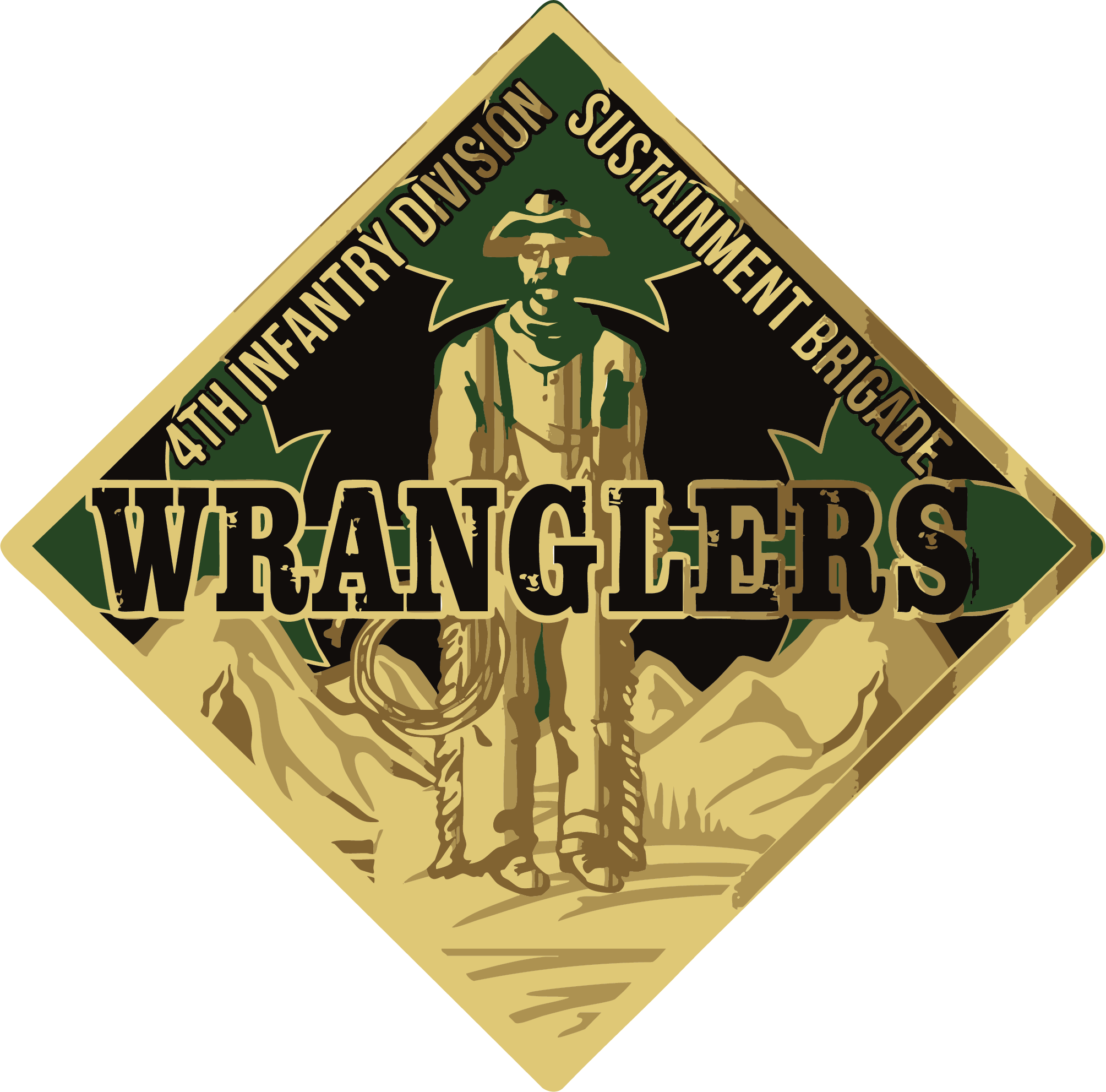
- Active: 2006 – present
- Country: United States
- Branch: United States Army
- Type: Sustainment brigade
- Role: Logistics
- Size: Brigade
- Part of: 4th Infantry Division
- Garrison/HQ: Fort Carson
- Nickname: "Wranglers"
- Motto: Hem Perficite
- Battle honours: Vietnam, Iraq

Commanders
- Commander: COL Heather M. Reilly
- Command Sergeant Major: CSM Michael S. Riggs

Insignia
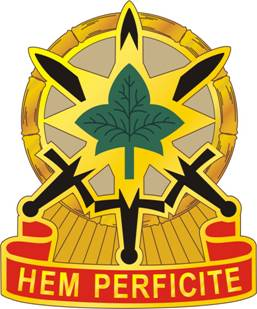
- Distinctive unit insignia

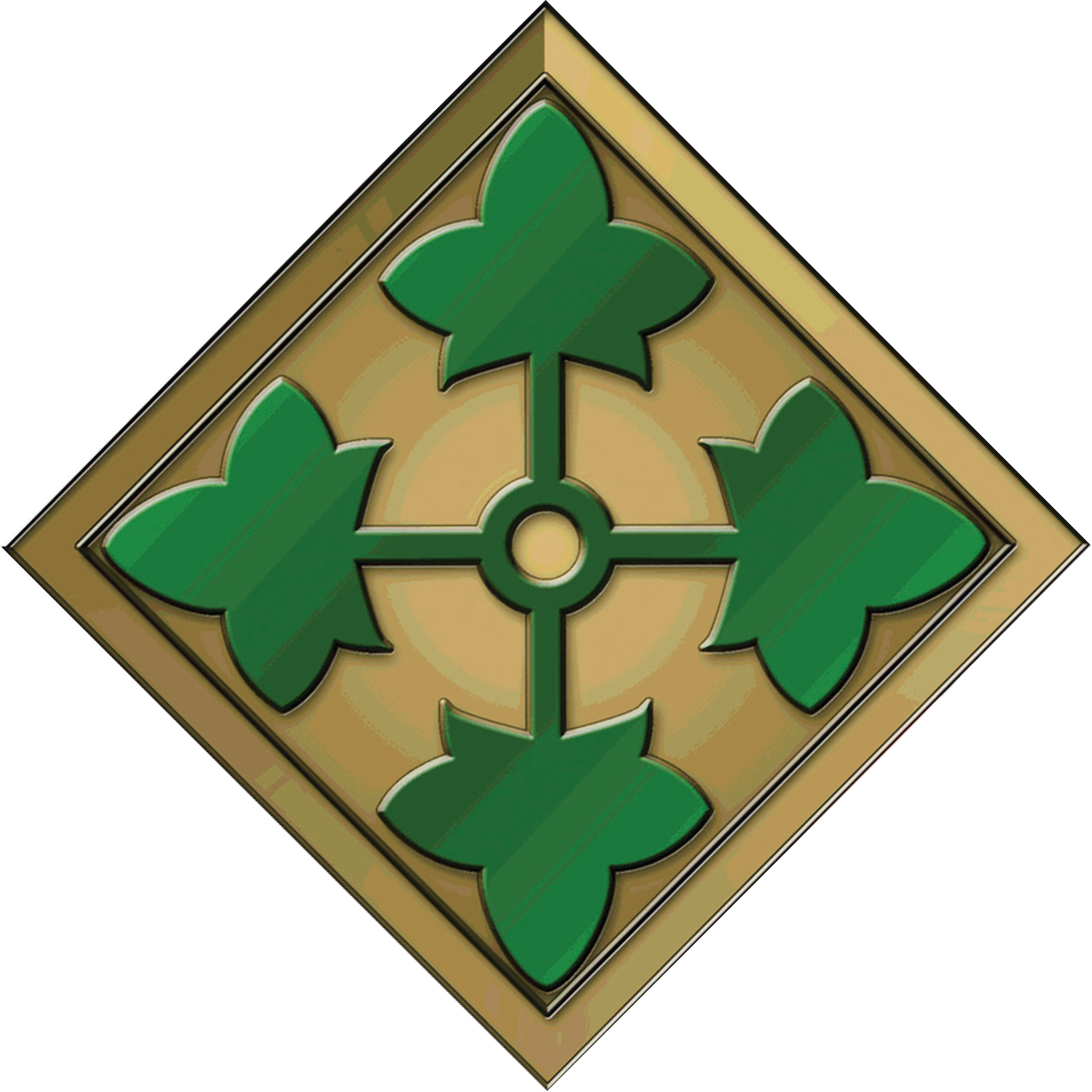
- 4th Infantry Division shoulder sleeve insignia

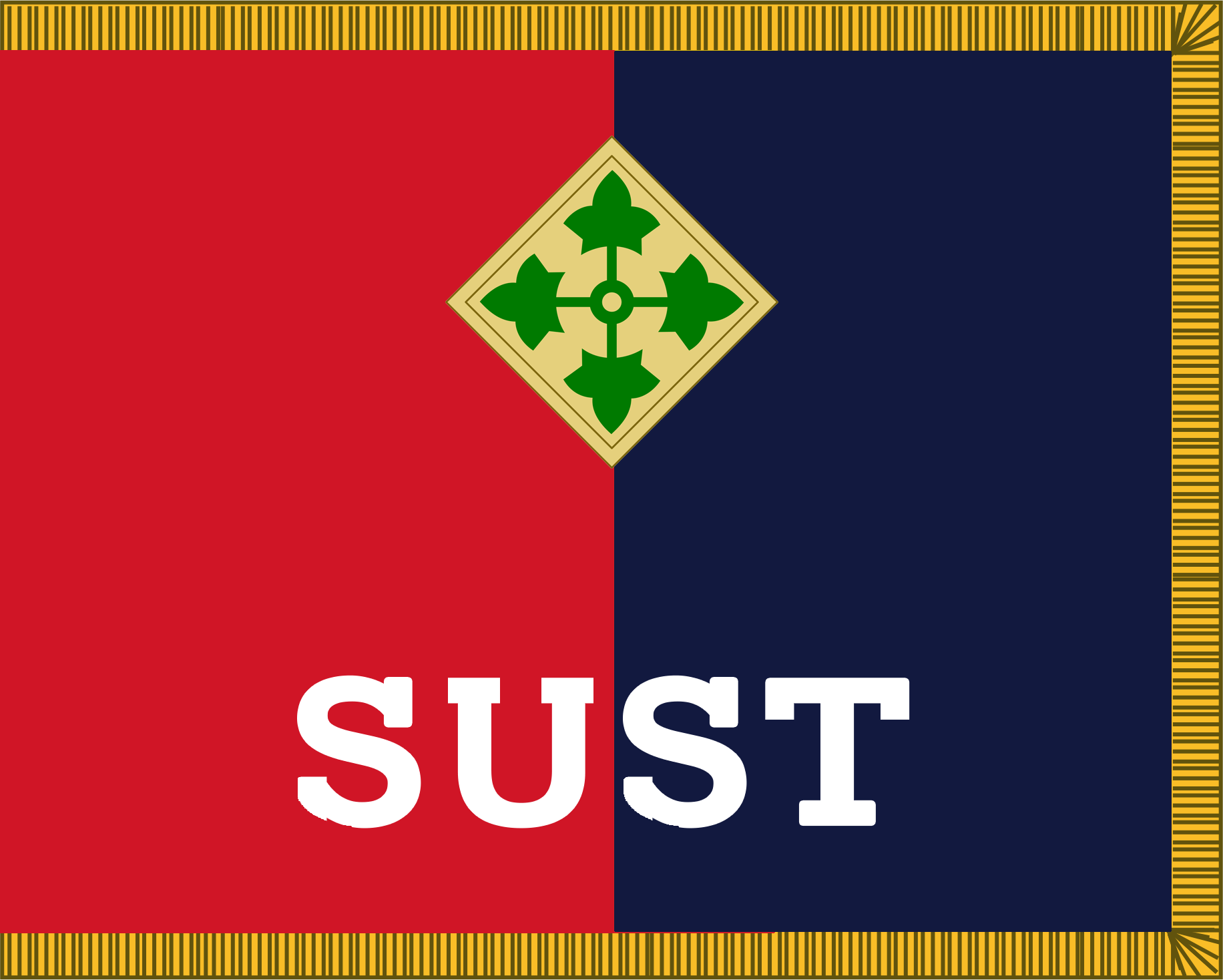
- 4th Division Sustainment Brigade Flag

The 4th Infantry Division Sustainment Brigade (DSB) is a sustainment brigade of the United States Army. It provides logistical support to the 4th Infantry Division and it consists of the following units:

- Division Sustainment Troops Battalion (DSTB)
- 68th Division Sustainment Support Battalion (68th DSSB)
- 4th Engineer Battalion (4th Eng)

== History ==
=== Origins ===
The 4th Infantry Division Support Command (DISCOM) saw its origin in April 1957 as the Headquarters and Headquarters Company and Material Management Control, 4th Infantry Division. The DISCOM and its subordinate units were undergoing redesign as new technologies and force structures were introduced to meet the needs of the Army's Force XXI Division.

While the DISCOM proper was relatively young, the units that comprised the DISCOM had been formed, each with a rich and distinct history with the Ironhorse Division. These units included the 4th Supply Trains (1917) known as the 4th Forward Support Battalion , the 64th Quartermaster Battalion (1942) or the 64th Forward Support Battalion (Fort Carson, CO) the 5th Sanitary Trains (1917) now known as the 204th Forward Support Battalion , the 704th Ordnance Light Maintenance Company (1943) known as the 704th Division Support Battalion ; and finally the youngest member of the DISCOM; the 404th Aviation Support Battalion (1996).

Since the DISCOM's inception in 1957, it had participated in eleven Vietnam campaigns, earning three campaign streamers. Collectively the DISCOM units had served in three wars and earned more than twenty campaign streamers.

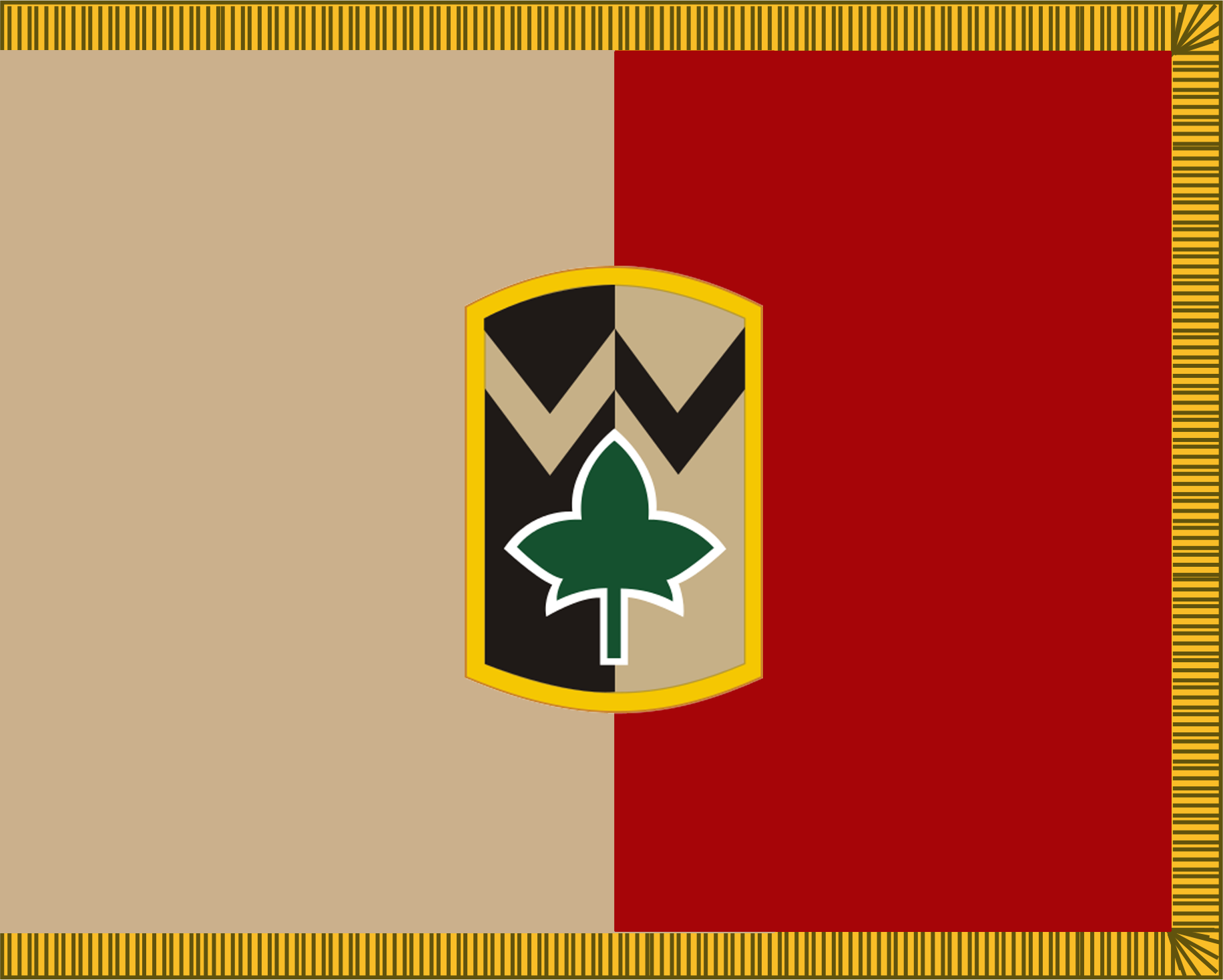
4th Sustainment Brigade Flag

In 2001, soldiers from the Division Support Command supported two NTC rotations, including the Division Capstone Exercise I, and the DCX II Division Warfighter Exercise. The performance of the "Wranglers" had been instrumental to the Army leadership embracing the Force XXI technology. With most of the DISCOM's force modernization and fielding complete, its units were trained and ready to deploy worldwide in support of the 4th ID's Division Ready Brigade missions.

=== Iraq ===
==== Operation Iraqi Freedom I ====
In 2003, soldiers from the Sustainment Brigade deployed in support of Operation Iraqi Freedom. Sustainment Brigade was responsible for managing every aspect of logistics within Task Force Ironhorse. Typically limited to 15,000 soldiers, Task Force Ironhorse during Operation Iraqi Freedom exceeded over 27,000 soldiers. The Sustainment Brigade provided support to the division task force as it expanded to nine brigades and covered an area of operations approximately eight times the doctrinal size of an AOE division. The area of responsibility (AOR) was roughly equivalent to that of the state of West Virginia.

==== Operation Iraqi Freedom 05-07 ====
The 4th Infantry Division's Support Brigade held a Casing of the Colors ceremony for the brigade and Support Battalion colors during retreat at Cameron Field on 8 September 2005. The event signified the unit's deployment to Iraq in support of Operation Iraqi Freedom. The 470 soldiers of the Support Brigade were the first personnel from the division to deploy to Iraq. They left in late September 2005. The brigade made two stops along the way to Camp Taji, one at Camp Buehring, Kuwait, and the other at Camp Anaconda, Iraq. Soldiers trained for two weeks at Camp Beuhring. The training went from basic firing skills like confirming their zero to more quick individual training at the close-quarters marksmanship course and reacting to a suspicious vehicle at an entry control point. The soldiers' training reached its peak with live-fire convoy exercises, where soldiers moved vehicles into defensive and offensive positions, moved disabled vehicles and requested medical evacuations for injured personnel.

The unit received an official distinctive unit insignia and shoulder sleeve insignia in 2005. On 15 October 2005, the 4th Infantry Division's Sustainment Brigade replaced the 46th Corps Support Group from Fort Bragg, North Carolina, in support of Operation Iraqi Freedom, to provide logistical support throughout the Baghdad area. The brigade commander and primary staff symbolized the completion of their transfer of authority by presenting the commander and primary staff of the 46th challenge coins for their outstanding service. The nearly 350 4th Infantry Division troops were joined by three additional battalions of active-duty, National Guard and Reserve soldiers once in theater, increasing the Brigade's total strength to approximately 4,000 soldiers. Throughout 2006, the command was responsible for the training of support units for the Iraqi Army.

==== Operation New Dawn 11-12 ====
In February 2011, the 4th Sustainment Brigade provided continuous support in the reposturing of forces and equipment during Operation New Dawn from Contingency Operating Base Adder, Tallil, Iraq for 10 months. The brigade's success relied heavily on moving the right commodities at the right time to balance sustainment transportation movement requests with the retrograde requirements of responsible drawdown. Upon redeployment to Fort Hood, TX, the 4th Sustainment Brigade postured to conduct transfer of authority with the Provisional Brigade, which consists of soldiers from the 13th Sustainment Command (Expeditionary) in support of Wrangler Shift Operation.
