= Private equity in the 2010s =

Private equity (PE) expanded throughout the 2010s. As of 2019, there were nearly 7,000 PE firms within the United States, nearly $2.5 trillion globally in unspent cash (known as dry powder), and deal-making in private equity accounted for 13% of global acquisitions.

== Healthcare sector ==
Private equity in the healthcare industry surged during the 2010s, with 352 PE acquisitions in 2010, rising to 937 in 2020. A 2021 study concluded that 22,500 premature deaths in nursing homes during 2005–2017 were associated with PE ownership.

== Largest deals ==
In February 2013, H.J. Heinz went private through 3G Capital and Berkshire Hathaway in a deal valued at $28 billion. In 2015, the company merged with Kraft Foods to form Kraft Heinz, at which point 3G and Berkshire together owned approximately 50% of the merged entity.

In October 2013, Dell was acquired by Michael Dell and Silver Lake (investment firm) for $21.5 billion, the largest technology buyout at the time.

== Proposed legislation and reaction ==
In 2019, Senator Elizabeth Warren introduced legislation aimed at regulating private equity firms. Co-sponsored by Senators Kirsten Gillibrand and Bernie Sanders, among others, the bill aimed to hold firms liable for the debts and pension obligations of portfolio companies, and restrict private equity firms' receipt of dividends and fees from acquired companies. In response, the American Investment Council and the United States Chamber of Commerce conducted studies to analyze private equity’s economic benefits and the potential consequences of Warren’s legislation. An academic study by the University of Chicago, Harvard Business School and other institutions showed job losses following buyouts of public companies, and job gains after buyouts of private companies, casting doubts on "the efficacy of ‘one-size-fits-all’ policy prescriptions for private equity," according to report authors.

== ESG and impact investing ==
Many private equity firms embraced ESG and impact investing over the decade. Such investing has been criticized as greenwashing, largely due to a lack of parameters and varying definitions of the practice. The Impact Management Project, a protocol developed by 700 impact investing professionals to establish an evidence-based measurement of social and environmental returns, was launched in 2016.

== See also ==
- Private equity in the 2000s
- Private equity in the 2020s
