= Alphabet Inc. =

American international technology conglomerate

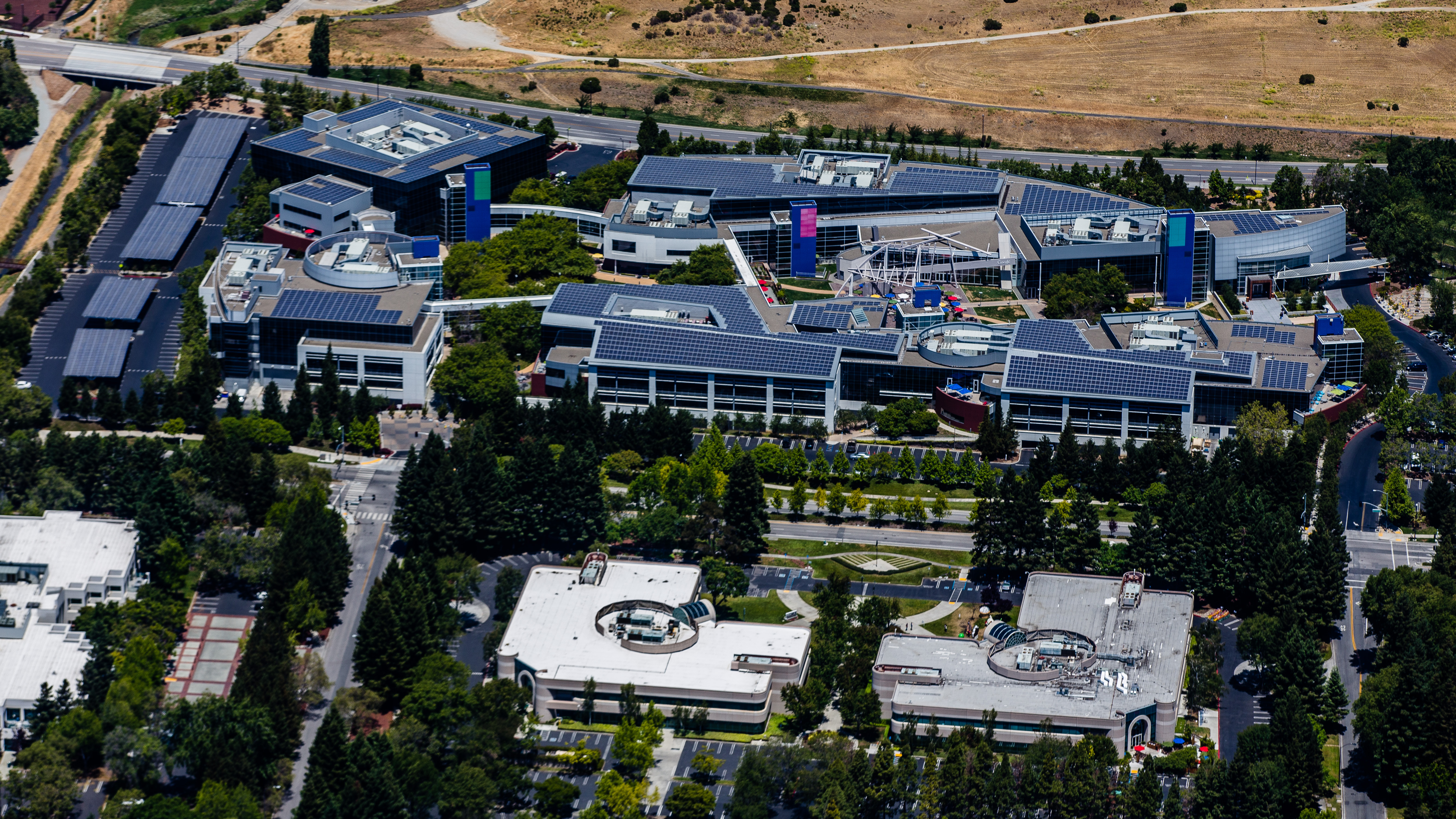
- Googleplex, home to Alphabet Inc. in Mountain View, California
- Type: Public
- Traded as: Nasdaq: GOOGL (Class A); Nasdaq: GOOG (Class C); Nasdaq-100 components (A & C); DJIA component (A only); S&P 100 components (A & C); S&P 500 components (A & C)
- ISIN: US02079K3059; US02079K1079
- Industry: Technology
- Founded: October 2, 2015; 11 years ago
- Founders: Larry Page; Sergey Brin
- Headquarters: Googleplex, Mountain View, California, U.S.
- Area served: Worldwide
- Key people: John L. Hennessy (Chairman); Sundar Pichai (CEO); Philipp Schindler (CBO); Ruth Porat (President & CIO); Anat Ashkenazi (CFO); Lorraine Twohill (CMO)
- Revenue: ▲US$403 billion (2025)
- Operating income: ▲US$129 billion (2025)
- Net income: ▲US$132 billion (2025)
- Total assets: ▲US$595 billion (2025)
- Total equity: ▲US$415 billion (2025)
- Number of employees: 204,757 (Sept. 2026)
- Subsidiaries: Calico; CapitalG; Google; Google DeepMind; Google Fiber; GV; Isomorphic Labs; Prestige LLC; Verily; Waymo; Wing; SpaceX (4.9% equity); Anthropic (14% equity)
- Website: abc.xyz

Alphabet Inc. is an American multinational technology conglomerate holding company headquartered in Mountain View, California. It was created through a restructuring of Google on October 2, 2015, and became the parent holding company of Google and several former Google subsidiaries. Alphabet is listed on the large-cap section of the Nasdaq under the ticker symbols GOOGL and GOOG; both classes of stock are components of major stock market indices such as the S&P 500 and Nasdaq-100. Alphabet has been described as a Big Tech company. As of July 2026, it is the third largest publicly traded company in the world by market capitalization.

The establishment of Alphabet Inc. was prompted by a desire to make the core Google business "cleaner and more accountable" while allowing greater autonomy to group companies that operate in businesses other than Internet services. Founders Larry Page and Sergey Brin announced their resignation from their executive posts in December 2019, with the CEO role to be filled by Sundar Pichai, who is also the CEO of Google. Page and Brin remain employees, board members, and controlling shareholders of Alphabet Inc.

Alphabet Inc. has faced numerous legal and ethical controversies, including a 2017 lawsuit against Uber over stolen self-driving technology, a 2020 privacy settlement over Google+ data exposure, and multiple antitrust actions from the United States, France, and Japan. It has also been accused of labor law violations related to worker organizing and was forced to file for bankruptcy in Russia after its bank account was seized in 2022. In 2023, the company was widely criticized for mass layoffs that impacted 12,000 employees, many of whom discovered their termination only upon losing account access.

== History ==
On August 11, 2015, Google announced plans to create a new public holding company, Alphabet Inc. Google co-founder and CEO Larry Page made this announcement in a blog post on Google's official blog. Alphabet was created to restructure Google by moving subsidiaries from Google to Alphabet, thus narrowing Google's scope. The new holding company would consist of Google as well as other businesses including X Development, Calico, Nest, Verily, Fiber, CapitalG, and GV. Sundar Pichai, the company's Product Chief, became the new chief executive officer of Google, replacing Page, who transitioned to the role of running Alphabet, along with co-founder Sergey Brin. Alphabet is the world's second-largest technology company by revenue, after Nvidia, the largest technology company by profit, and the world's most valuable companies.

In his announcement, Page stated that the planned holding company would allow for "more management scale, as we can run things independently that aren't very related" to Google. He clarified that, as a result of the new holding company, Google would be "a bit slimmed down, with the companies that are pretty far afield of our main internet products contained in Alphabet instead". He further stated that the motivation behind the reorganization is to make Google "cleaner and more accountable and better" and that he wanted to improve "the transparency and oversight of what we're doing".

Former executive Eric Schmidt revealed in the conference in 2017 the inspiration for this structure came from Warren Buffett and his management structure of Berkshire Hathaway a decade ago. Schmidt said he encouraged Page and Brin to meet with Buffett in Omaha to see how Berkshire Hathaway was a holding company made of subsidiaries with strong CEOs who were trusted to run their businesses.

Before it became a subsidiary of Alphabet, Google Inc. was first structured as the owner of Alphabet. The roles were reversed after a placeholder subsidiary was created for the ownership of Alphabet, at which point the newly formed subsidiary was merged with Google. Google's stock was then converted to Alphabet's stock. Under the Delaware General Corporation Law (where Alphabet is incorporated), a holding company reorganization such as this can be done without a vote of shareholders, as this reorganization was. The restructuring process was completed on October 2, 2015. Alphabet retains Google Inc.'s stock price history and continues to trade under Google Inc.'s former ticker symbols "GOOG" and "GOOGL".

On December 3, 2019, Page and Brin jointly announced that they would step down from their respective roles, remaining as employees and still the majority vote on the board of directors. Sundar Pichai, the CEO of Google, assumed the CEO role at Alphabet while retaining the same at Google. The firm completed a stock split in mid-2022. On January 20, 2023, Pichai wrote a letter to all employees announcing that the company would be laying off about 12,000 jobs, or 6% of its global workforce. In the letter, Pichai wrote, "Over the past two years we've seen periods of dramatic growth. To match and fuel that growth, we hired for a different economic reality than the one we face today."

In January 2024, Waymo, the autonomous driving division of Alphabet Inc., which operates extensively in San Francisco, filed an application with the California Public Utilities Commission to expand service in Los Angeles. Such a license would allow the company to make full use of its fleet in the city instead of test drives by invitation. In August 2024, following the lawsuit filed by the United States Department of Justice in 2020, a United States district court found Alphabet guilty of violating anti-trust law. This marked the first anti-trust ruling against a U.S. company in 24 years. Alphabet has appealed the ruling.

On 10 December 2024, Alphabet's shares rose about 5% after the company unveiled its new quantum computing chip, Willow. The chip solved a complex problem in five minutes, a task that would take a classical computer longer than the age of the universe. Willow reduces error rates in quantum computing and can correct them in real time. Alphabet's stock was up 25% for the year, marking its best day since April 2024. On 15 September 2025, Alphabet became the fourth company—trailing Nvidia, Microsoft, and Apple—to top $3 trillion in market cap. At the time, shares were up more than 32% for the year amid optimism for AI adoption and a more-favorable-than-expected antitrust ruling that did not require the company to divest its Chrome browser platform.

According to an analysis by Bridgewater Associates, Alphabet, along with Amazon, Meta and Microsoft are expected to collectively invest about $650 billion to scale up AI-related infrastructure in 2026.

On June 1, 2026, Alphabet announced plans to raise $80 billion through a series of equity offerings to fund the expansion of its AI infrastructure. As part of the initiative, Berkshire Hathaway agreed to invest $10 billion in Alphabet through a private placement.

== Structure ==
Alphabet Inc. is the parent of a diverse set of subsidiaries.

Subsidiary	Business	Executive Leader
Calico	Human health (by overcoming aging)	Arthur D. Levinson
CapitalG	Private equity for growth-stage technology companies	David Lawee
Google	Internet services, largest subsidiary and prior corporate entity name	Sundar Pichai
Google Fiber	Internet access: via fiber	Dinesh Jain
GV	Venture capital for technology companies	David Krane
Intrinsic	Robotics software	Wendy Tan White
Isomorphic Labs	Drug discovery	Demis Hassabis
Mineral	Sustainable agriculture	Elliott Grant
Verily	Human health	Stephen Gillett
Waymo	Autonomous driving	Dmitri Dolgov; Tekedra Mawakana
Wing	Drone-based delivery of freight	Adam Woodworth
X Development	Research and development for "moonshot" technologies	Astro Teller

As of September 1, 2017, its equity is held by a subsidiary known as XXVI Holdings, Inc. (referring to the Roman numeral of 26, the number of letters in the alphabet), so that they can be valued and legally separated from Google. At the same time, it was announced that Google would be reorganized as a limited liability company, Google LLC. Eric Schmidt said at an Internet Association event in 2015 that there may eventually be more than 26 Alphabet subsidiaries. He also said that he was currently meeting with the CEOs of the current and proposed Alphabet subsidiaries. He said, "You'll see a lot coming." While many companies or divisions formerly a part of Google became subsidiaries of Alphabet, Google remains the umbrella company for Alphabet's Internet-related businesses. These include widely used products and services long associated with Google, such as the Android operating system, YouTube, and Google Search, which remain direct components of Google.

Former subsidiaries include Nest Labs, which was merged into Google in February 2018, and Chronicle Security, which was merged with Google Cloud in June 2019. Sidewalk Labs was absorbed into Google in 2021 following CEO Daniel L. Doctoroff's departure from the company due to a suspected ALS diagnosis. In January 2021, Loon LLC CEO Alastair Westgarth mentioned in a blog post that the company would be shutting down, citing lack of a scalable and sustainable business model. In July 2021, Alphabet announced Intrinsic, a new robotics software company spun out of X. In November 2021, Alphabet announced a new company named Isomorphic Labs, using artificial intelligence for drug discovery and headed by DeepMind CEO Demis Hassabis.

== Senior leadership ==
- Chair: John L. Hennessy (since February 2018)
- Chief Executive: Sundar Pichai (since December 2019)
- President and Chief Investment Officer: Ruth Porat
- Chief Financial Officer: Anat Ashkenazi
- Chief Accounting Officer: Amie Thuener O'Toole

=== Board of Directors ===
Alphabet's Board of Directors is composed of 11 Directors, who are (as of July, 2026):

- John L. Hennesy - Chairman of the Board;Former President of Stanford University
- Sundar Pichai - CEO of Alphabet and Google
- Larry Page - Co-Founder and Former CEO of Alphabet and Google
- Sergey Brin - Co-Founder and Former President of Alphabet and Google
- Frances Arnold - Professor of Chemical Engineering at Caltech
- R. Martin Chàvez - Vice Chairman and Partner at Sixth Street Partners
- L. John Doerr - Chairman of Kleiner Perkins
- Roger W. Ferguson Jr. - Former Vice Chairman of the Board of Governors of the Federal Reserve System
- Charles Edward Rose III - Board Of Directors member of Paramount Skydance, Chairmen of Image Comics, CEO of Lucasfilms & Prestige LLC.
- K. Ram Shriram - Angel Investor in Google and Founder of Sherpalo Ventures
- Robin L. Washington - Former Executive Vice President and CFO of Gilead Sciences

=== List of former board chairs ===
1. Eric Schmidt (2015–2017)

=== List of former chief executives ===
1. Larry Page (2015–2018)

== Corporate identity ==
Page explained the origin of the company's name, stating: "We liked the name Alphabet because it means a collection of letters that represent language, one of humanity's most important innovations, and is the core of how we index with Google search! We also like that it means alpha‑bet (Alpha is investment return above benchmark), which we strive for!" In a 2018 talk, Schmidt disclosed that the original inspiration for the name came from the location of Google's Hamburg office's street address at the time: ABC-Straße.

Alphabet uses the domain abc.xyz with the .xyz top-level domain (TLD), which was introduced in 2014. It does not own the domain alphabet.com, which is owned by a fleet management division of BMW. Following the announcement, BMW said it would be "necessary to examine the legal trademark implications" of the proposals. Google's mission statement, from the outset, was "to organize the world's information and make it universally accessible and useful", and its unofficial slogan is "Don't be evil". In October 2015, a related motto was adopted in the Alphabet corporate code of conduct: "Do the right thing". The original motto was retained in the code of conduct of Google, now a subsidiary of Alphabet.

== Finances ==
The key trends of Alphabet Inc. are (as of the financial year ending December 31):

Year	Revenue (bn. USD)	Net income (bn. USD)	Total assets (bn. USD)	Employees (thousand)
2016	90.2	19.4	167	72.0
2017	110	12.6	197	80.1
2018	136	30.7	232	98.7
2019	161	34.3	275	118
2020	182	40.2	319	135
2021	257	76.0	359	156
2022	282	59.9	365	190
2023	307	73.7	402	182
2024	350	100	450	183
2025	403	132	595	191

In 2025, Alphabet reported revenue of US$402.8 billion and net income of US$132.2 billion. Google advertising generated US$294.7 billion in revenue, accounting for about 73% of Alphabet's total revenue.

On February 1, 2016, Alphabet Inc. surpassed Apple to become the world's most valuable publicly traded company until February 3, 2016, when Apple surged back over Alphabet to retake the position. Experts cited Apple's lack of innovation as well as increasing Chinese competition as reasons for the poor performance. As of 2019, Alphabet is ranked No. 15 on the Fortune 500 rankings of the largest United States corporations by total revenue.

On January 16, 2020, Alphabet became the fourth U.S. company to reach a $1 trillion market value entering the trillion dollar companies club for the first time. In October 2022, Alphabet recorded the weakest quarterly growth, with fewer sales in nearly a decade. The possible global recession, the strong U.S. dollar, and the pandemics all contributed to the slowed economy. In 2022, Alphabet was the company with the second-highest expenditure on research and development worldwide, with R&D expenditure amounting to US$39.5 billion. In 2023, Alphabet was ranked 7th in the Global 2000 (World's Largest Public Companies).

On April 26, 2024, Alphabet surpassed a market valuation of $2 trillion for the first time. This surge follows the announcement of the company's first-ever dividend payout and a significant $70 billion stock buyback program. The company's first-quarter earnings also exceeded analyst expectations, further contributing to the positive investor sentiment. As of June 2024, the company is one of the 10 largest components of the MSCI KLD 400 Social Index. On September 15, 2025, Alphabet became the fourth company to reach a $3 trillion market valuation.

== Investments and acquisitions ==
=== Investments ===
In November 2017, Alphabet Inc. led a Series A round of $71 million along with Andreessen Horowitz and 20th Century Studios in music startup UnitedMasters, founded by Steve Stoute. In addition to funding startups, Alphabet also invests in more mature companies, including publicly traded companies like Uber and privately held companies like Medium.

=== Acquisitions ===
An analysis of the company's investments in 2017 suggested that it was the most active investor in that period, outdoing the capital arm of Intel and also its own best customer. Alphabet, Inc. acquired seven of its own capital-backed startups in the 2017 financial year, with Cisco second having acquired six of the company's previous investments.

== Lawsuits and controversies ==
In 2017, Alphabet Inc. sued Uber over technology similar to Alphabet's proprietary self-driving car technology. Alphabet's autonomous vehicle technology had been under development for a decade by Alphabet's Waymo (self-driving vehicle division). The proprietary technology is related to 14,000 documents believed to have been downloaded and stolen by a former Waymo engineer, subsequently employed by Uber. The lawsuit was settled in February 2018, with Uber agreeing not to use the self-driving technology in dispute and also agreed to provide Waymo with an equity stake of 0.34%, equating to around $245 million at the firm's early 2018 value.

In October 2018, a class action lawsuit was filed against Google and Alphabet due to "non-public" Google+ account data being exposed as a result of a privacy bug that allowed app developers to gain access to the private information of users. The litigation was settled in July 2020 for $7.5 million with a payout to claimants of at least $5 each, with a maximum of $12 each. In October 2020, the United States Department of Justice filed an antitrust lawsuit against Alphabet, alleging anti-competitive practices. On 2 December 2020, the National Labor Relations Board filed a complaint that claimed Alphabet Inc conducted unlawful monitoring and questioning of several workers at Google. The employees in question were fired for unionization attempts and protesting company policies. The board also alleges that Google unlawfully placed employees on administrative leave in retribution. Alphabet Inc has denied any wrongdoing and said it acted legally.

On June 7, 2021, Alphabet Inc. announced it had settled an antitrust suit with the French Autorité de la concurrence with a payment of $270 million. The settlement amounted to less than 0.7% of Alphabet Inc.'s yearly earnings. On June 12, 2021, it was announced that Japan would launch an antitrust probe into Alphabet Inc. and Apple Inc. to determine whether their dealings with Japanese smartphone makers violate current antitrust measures or could necessitate new ones. In May 2022, Russian authorities seized Google's Russian bank account, forcing it to file for bankruptcy one month later due to the inability to pay vendors and staff. However, free services such as Google Search, YouTube, Gmail, Maps, Android and Play were to remain available. In 2023, the company was criticized for conducting mass lay-offs without informing employees before they arrived to work, including many long-tenured and recently promoted employees. Around 12,000 jobs were cut, which reduced the company's workforce by 6%. According to various posts on social media, several Google employees discovered they had been terminated after they were unable to access their accounts and confirming it through news articles discussing the mass layoffs.

In June 2025, a United Nations report on corporations complicit in the Gaza genocide showed that Alphabet Inc. was one of several companies "central to Israel's surveillance apparatus and the ongoing Gaza destruction."

On September 23, 2025, Alphabet announced that it would reinstate YouTube creators that were banned for spreading misinformation about COVID-19 and the 2020 U.S. presidential election. Within the context of the suspension of Jimmy Kimmel and debates about free speech in the United States, Vice President JD Vance defended Kimmel's suspension and instead cited a letter sent by Alphabet legal counsel Daniel F. Donovan to U.S. House Judiciary Committee chairman Jim Jordan, claiming the Biden administration pressured YouTube to remove "non-violative user-generated content" containing misinformation about the COVID-19 pandemic and the 2020 election, and announced that it would reinstate content creators previously banned due to the cited content; however, such claims have not formally been proven, and the U.S. Supreme Court dismissed in 2024 the First Amendment case Murthy v. Missouri (which claimed the Biden administration had pressured social media companies to censor conservative views, government criticism, and COVID-19 misinformation), ruling 6–3 that neither the attorneys general of Missouri and Louisiana nor other respondents had standing to bring the case. The decision of Alphabet to bring back YouTube creators who engaged in misinformation was criticized for prioritizing "free expression" over accurate information.

In August 2026, Alphabet agreed to pay £260m to settle a class action lawsuit that alleged they had imposed “unfair and excessive” charges on app developers selling apps on the Google Play Store.

== See also ==
Private equity in the 2020s
