= List of companies by research and development spending =

The following list sorts companies with the highest expenditures for research and development (R&D) for different years, mostly taken from the magazine Strategy+Business.

== 2024 top 20 ==
The 20 companies with the highest research and development expenses in 2024.

Rank	Company	Country	Sector	Expenditures on R&D (billions of Euro)
1	Amazon	United States	Software and Internet	65.0
2	Alphabet Inc.	United States	Software and Internet	47.2
3	Meta Platforms, Inc.	United States	Software and Internet	40.5
4	Microsoft	United States	Software and Internet	33.7
5	Apple	United States	Computing and Electronics	29.4
6	Samsung Electronics	South Korea	Computing and Electronics	24.8
7	Volkswagen Group	Germany	Automotive	23.6
8	Huawei	China	Computing and Electronics	22.8
9	Roche Holding	Switzerland	Health Care	15.7
10	Toyota	Japan	Automotive	14.3
11	Intel	United States	Computing and Electronics	14.1
12	Nvidia	United States	Computing and Electronics	13.9
13	Merck & Co.	United States	Health Care	13.7
14	Johnson & Johnson	United States	Health Care	13.4
15	Novartis	Switzerland	Health Care	13.0
16	TSMC	Taiwan	Computing and Electronics	12.7
17	Pfizer	United States	Health Care	12.4
18	AstraZeneca	United Kingdom/Sweden	Health Care	12.1
19	Bosch	Germany	Automotive	11.9
20	Bayer	Germany	Health Care	11.6

== 2022 top 20 ==
The 20 companies with the highest research and development expenses in 2022.

Rank	Company	Country	Sector	Expenditures on R&D (billions of US$)
1	Amazon	United States	Software and Internet	73.21
2	Alphabet Inc.	United States	Software and Internet	39.50
3	Meta Platforms, Inc.	United States	Software and Internet	35.34
4	Apple	United States	Computing and Electronics	27.65
5	Microsoft	United States	Software and Internet	26.63
6	Huawei	China	Computing and Electronics	24.00
7	Volkswagen Group	Germany	Automotive	19.88
8	Samsung Electronics	South Korea	Computing and Electronics	19.29
9	Intel	United States	Computing and Electronics	17.53
10	Roche Holding	Switzerland	Health Care	14.72
11	Johnson & Johnson	United States	Health Care	14.6
12	Merck & Co.	United States	Health Care	13.55
13	Pfizer	United States	Health Care	11.43
14	Novartis	Switzerland	Health Care	10
15	General Motors	United States	Automotive	9.8
16	AstraZeneca	United Kingdom/Sweden	Health Care	9.76
17	Bristol Myers Squibb	United States	Health Care	9.51
18	Tencent	China	Software and Internet	9.12
19	Qualcomm	United States	Computing and Electronics	8.52
20	Alibaba Group	China	Software and Internet	7.98

== 2020 top 10 ==
The 10 companies with the highest research and development expenses in 2020.

Rank	Company	Country	Sector	Expenditures on R&D (billions of US$)
1	Amazon	United States	Software and Internet	42.74
2	Alphabet Inc.	United States	Software and Internet	27.57
3	Huawei	China	Computing and Electronics	22.04
4	Microsoft	United States	Software and Internet	19.27
5	Apple	United States	Computing and Electronics	18.75
5	Samsung Electronics	South Korea	Computing and Electronics	18.75
6	Facebook	United States	Software and Internet	18.45
7	Volkswagen Group	Germany	Automotive	
8	Intel	United States	Computing and Electronics	
9	Roche Holding	Switzerland	Health Care	
10	Johnson & Johnson	United States	Health Care	

== 2018 top 50 ==
The 50 companies with the highest research and development expenses in 2018.

Rank	Company	Country	Sector	Expenditures on R&D (billions of US$)
1	Amazon	United States	Software and Internet	22.62
2	Alphabet Inc.	United States	Software and Internet	16.23
3	Volkswagen Group	Germany	Automotive	15.77
4	Samsung Electronics	South Korea	Computing and Electronics	15.31
5	Microsoft	United States	Software and Internet	14.74
6	Huawei	China	Computing and Electronics	13.60
7	Intel	United States	Computing and Electronics	13.10
8	Apple Inc.	United States	Computing and Electronics	11.58
9	Roche Holding	Switzerland	Health Care	10.80
10	Johnson & Johnson	United States	Health Care	10.55
11	Daimler AG	Germany	Automotive	10.40
12	Merck & Co.	United States	Health Care	10.21
13	Toyota	Japan	Automotive	10.02
14	Novartis	Switzerland	Health Care	8.51
15	Ford	United States	Automotive	8.00
16	Facebook	United States	Software and Internet	7.75
17	Pfizer	United States	Health Care	7.66
18	BMW	Germany	Automotive	7.33
19	General Motors	United States	Automotive	7.30
20	Robert Bosch GmbH	Germany	Industrials	7.12
21	Honda	Japan	Automotive	7.08
22	Sanofi	France	Health Care	6.57
23	Bayer	Germany	Health Care	6.19
24	Siemens	Germany	Industrials	6.10
25	Oracle Corporation	United States	Software and Internet	6.09
26	Cisco	United States	Computing and Electronics	6.06
27	GlaxoSmithKline	United Kingdom	Health Care	6.05
28	Bristol-Myers Squibb	United States	Health Care	5.96
29	Celgene	United States	Health Care	5.92
30	Nokia	Finland	Computing and Electronics	5.90
31	IBM	United States	Computing and Electronics	5.79
32	Qualcomm	United States	Computing and Electronics	5.47
33	AstraZeneca	United Kingdom/Sweden	Health Care	5.41
34	Eli Lilly and Company	United States	Health Care	5.28
35	Fiat Chrysler Automobiles	Italy/United States	Automotive	5.14
36	AbbVie	United States	Health Care	4.98
37	General Electric	United States	Industrials	4.80
38	Dell	United States	Computing and Electronics	4.76
39	Ericsson	Sweden	Computing and Electronics	4.63
40	Nissan	Japan	Automotive	4.62
41	Sony	Japan	Computing and Electronics	4.32
42	Panasonic	Japan	Computing and Electronics	4.23
43	Denso	Japan	Automotive	4.21
44	SAP SE	Germany	Software and Internet	4.03
45	Gilead Sciences	United States	Health Care	3.73
46	Continental AG	Germany	Automotive	3.73
47	Boehringer Ingelheim	Germany	Health Care	3.69
48	Alibaba Group	China	Software and Internet	3.63
49	Amgen	United States	Health Care	3.56
50	Renault	France	Automotive	3.55

== 2017 top 20 ==
The 20 companies with the highest research and development expenses in 2017 according to the Global Innovation 1000.

Rank	Company	Country	Sector	Expenditures on R&D (billions of US$)
1	Amazon	United States	Software and Internet	16.1
2	Alphabet Inc.	United States	Software and Internet	13.9
3	Intel	United States	Computing and Electronics	12.7
4	Samsung	South Korea	Computing and Electronics	12.7
5	Volkswagen Group	Germany	Automotive	12.1
6	Microsoft	United States	Software and Internet	12.0
7	Roche Holding	Switzerland	Health Care	11.4
8	Merck & Co.	United States	Health Care	10.1
9	Apple Inc.	United States	Computing and Electronics	10.0
10	Novartis	Switzerland	Health Care	9.6
11	Toyota	Japan	Automotive	9.3
12	Johnson & Johnson	United States	Health Care	9.1
13	General Motors	United States	Automotive	8.1
14	Pfizer	United States	Health Care	7.9
15	Ford	United States	Automotive	7.3
16	Daimler AG	Germany	Automotive	6.9
17	Oracle Corporation	United States	Software and Internet	6.8
18	Cisco	United States	Computing and Electronics	6.3
19	Honda	Japan	Automotive	6.2
20	Facebook	United States	Software and Internet	5.9

== 2014 top 20 ==
The 20 companies with the highest research and development expenses in 2014 according to the Global Innovation 1000.

Rank	Company	Country	Sector	Expenditures on R&D (billions of US$)
1	Volkswagen Group	Germany	Automotive	13.5
2	Samsung	South Korea	Computing and Electronics	13.4
3	Intel	United States	Computing and Electronics	10.6
4	Microsoft	United States	Software and Internet	10.4
5	Roche Holding	Switzerland	Health Care	10.0
6	Novartis	Switzerland	Health Care	9.9
7	Toyota	Japan	Automotive	9.1
8	Johnson & Johnson	United States	Health Care	8.2
9	Google	United States	Software and Internet	8.0
10	Merck & Co.	United States	Health Care	7.5
11	General Motors	United States	Automotive	7.2
12	Daimler AG	Germany	Automotive	7.0
13	Pfizer	United States	Health Care	6.7
14	Amazon	United States	Software and Internet	6.4
15	Ford	United States	Automotive	6.4
16	Sanofi	France	Health Care	6.3
17	Honda	Japan	Automotive	6.3
18	IBM	United States	Computing and Electronics	6.2
19	GlaxoSmithKline	United Kingdom	Health Care	6.1
20	Cisco	United States	Computing and Electronics	5.9

== 2011 top 20 ==
The 20 companies with the highest research and development expenses in 2011 according to the Global Innovation 1000.

Rank	Company	Country	Sector	Expenditures on R&D (millions of US$)
1	Roche Holding	Switzerland	Health Care	9,646
2	Pfizer	United States	Health Care	9,413
3	Novartis	Switzerland	Health Care	9,070
4	Microsoft	United States	Software and Internet	8,714
5	Merck & Co.	United States	Health Care	8,591
6	Toyota	Japan	Automotive	8,546
7	Samsung	South Korea	Computing and Electronics	7,873
8	Nokia	Finland	Computing and Electronics	7,778
9	General Motors	United States	Automotive	6,962
10	Johnson & Johnson	United States	Health Care	6,844
11	Intel	United States	Computing and Electronics	6,576
12	Panasonic	Japan	Computing and Electronics	6,176
13	GlaxoSmithKline	United Kingdom	Health Care	6,127
14	Volkswagen Group	Germany	Automotive	6,086
15	IBM	United States	Computing and Electronics	6,026
16	Sanofi	France	Health Care	5,836
17	Honda	Japan	Automotive	5,704
18	AstraZeneca	United Kingdom	Health Care	5,318
19	Cisco	United States	Computing and Electronics	5,273
20	Siemens	Germany	Industrials	5,217

== 2008 top 20 ==
The 20 companies with the highest research and development expenses in 2008 according to the Global Innovation 1000.

Rank	Company	Country	Sector	Expenditures on R&D (millions of US$)
1	Toyota	Japan	Automotive	8,386
2	General Motors	United States	Automotive	8,100
3	Pfizer	United States	Health Care	8,089
4	Nokia	Finland	Computing and Electronics	7,727
5	Johnson & Johnson	United States	Health Care	7,680
6	Ford	United States	Automotive	7,500
7	Microsoft	United States	Software and Internet	7,121
8	Roche Holding	Switzerland	Health Care	6,985
9	Samsung	South Korea	Computing and Electronics	6,536
10	GlaxoSmithKline	United Kingdom	Health Care	6,476
11	Novartis	Switzerland	Health Care	6,430
12	Sanofi	France	Health Care	6,208
13	IBM	United States	Computing and Electronics	6,153
14	Intel	United States	Computing and Electronics	5,755
15	AstraZeneca	United Kingdom	Health Care	5,162
16	Honda	Japan	Automotive	5,142
17	Merck & Co.	United States	Health Care	4,883
18	Panasonic	Japan	Computing and Electronics	4,850
19	Volkswagen Group	Germany	Automotive	4,757
20	Sony	Japan	Computing and Electronics	4,553
