= Crystal Mackall =

American physician and immunologist

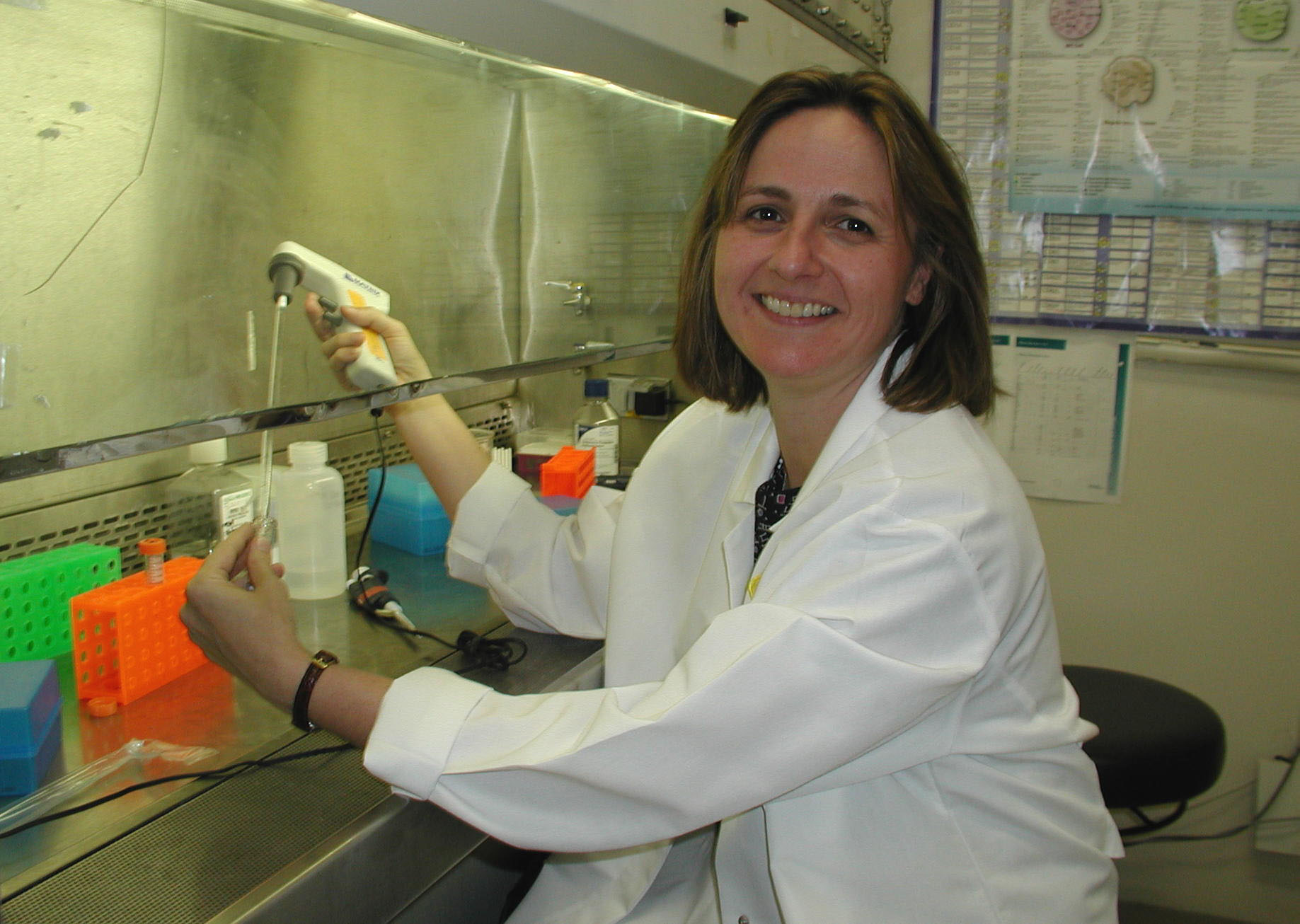
- Mackall at the National Cancer Institute in 2002
- Born: Crystal L. Mackall
- Education: University of Akron; Northeast Ohio Medical University
- Awards: National Institutes of Health Director's Award; National Cancer Institute Director's Award
- Scientific career
- Fields: Immunotherapy; Chimeric antigen receptors Pediatric oncology T cell homeostasis
- Workplaces: Stanford University; National Cancer Institute; National Institutes of Health
- Website: profiles.stanford.edu/crystal-mackall

Crystal L. Mackall (born August 21, 1960) is an American physician and immunologist. She is currently the Ernest and Amelia Gallo Family Professor and Professor of Pediatrics and Medicine at Stanford University. She is the founding director of the Stanford Center for Cancer Cell Therapy and the Director of the Parker Institute for Cancer Immunotherapy @ Stanford.

== Education and early career ==
Mackall grew up in East Palestine, Ohio in a working-class family; her father was a steelworker. She received her medical training through a six-year BS/MD program, earning her bachelor's degree at the University of Akron and graduated summa cum laude. She completed her medical education at Northeast Ohio Medical University, earning her Doctor of Medicine in 1984. She was a member of the Alpha Omega Alpha honour society. Mackall completed an internal medicine and pediatrics Residency at Cleveland Clinic Akron General and Children's Hospital of Akron in 1988. In 1989, Mackall joined the National Cancer Institute as a fellow in pediatric oncology, where she began to focus on immunotherapy for cancer. She remained at National Institutes of Health until 2016, eventually serving as the Chief of the Pediatric Oncology Branch. She moved to the Stanford University School of Medicine in 2016.

== Research ==
Mackall has pioneered cancer immunotherapies with a major focus on children's cancers. Her early research defined the detrimental effects of traditional cancer therapies on the immune system, where she identified important age related differences, defined the role of the thymus in human T cell regeneration and discovered that Interleukin-7 (IL-7) is the main regulator of T cell homeostasis in humans. Her group was among the first to demonstrate impressive activity of CD19 chimeric antigen receptor (CAR T cells) therapies for childhood leukemia and also developed a CAR targeting CD22 that is active in this disease and has received Breakthrough Therapy Designation from the US FDA for treatment of CAR19 refractory B-ALL. The CD22-CAR developed by Mackall's team is also active in large B cell lymphoma and has received Breakthrough Therapy Designation from the US FDA for this indication. Mackall co-founded CARGO Therapeutics to commercialize the CD22-CAR, and she also co-founded Lyell Immunopharma, which is developing CAR T cell therapies as well as Link Cell Therapies, a startup that is testing a novel AND gate CAR T cell in solid cancers.

Working with the Monje lab at Stanford, Mackall developed a GD2-CAR that showed activity in preclinical models of diffuse midline glioma, which are lethal brain tumor occurring primarily in children and young adults, and her group demonstrated that intracerebroventricular delivery of CAR T cells is more potent for treatment of brain tumors in mice than intravenous delivery. Mackall and Monje are leading a clinical trial of GD2-CAR for diffuse midline gliomas, given intravenously and intracerebroventricularly, that has shown clinical activity. Based on this work, the FDA has designated the GD2-CAR therapy a Regenerative Medicine Advanced Therapeutic and Mackall is leading efforts to commercialize this therapy through ACCESSforKIDS, a non-profit advanced medicine biotech focused on delivering cell therapies for pediatric diseases.

Mackall has elucidated fundamental biology related to T cells, with a focus on T cell exhaustion, demonstrating that cJUN overexpression prevents T cell exhaustion and this work led to the launch of Lyell Immunopharma. Her group demonstrated that T cell exhaustion can be reversed by transient T cell rest and demonstrated that dasatinib, a commonly prescribed oral drug, could be used to rest human T cells. Mackall and Freitas discovered a role for the mediator kinase modules in regulating T cell effector differentiation and demonstrated that MED12 knockout increased the potency of human T cells in preclinical models. Mackall has led clinical trials of cancer vaccines, launched the first clinical trial of recombinant human interleukin-7, led studies of immune checkpoint inhibitors in pediatric cancers and studied a role for bone marrow transplants in pediatric solid tumors. In 2018 Mackall was awarded $11.9 million from the California Institute of Regenerative Medicine to lead a clinical trial using genetically modified T cells engineered to recognize CD19 or CD22 proteins expressed on leukemia or lymphoma. The trial was conducted at the Stanford Center for Cancer Cell Therapy, which modified the chimeric antigen receptor T cell (CAR-T) to identify B-cell lymphoblastic leukemia and B-cell lymphoma. In 2022, Mackall was awarded $11.9 million from the California Institute of Regenerative Medicine to lead a clinical trial using T cells engineered to express GD2-CAR T cells for treatment of diffuse midline gliomas.

Mackall holds a number of patents relating to peptides, antigen receptors and T cell fitness enhancements. She has served on the editorial boards of several cancer journals, including Cancer Today. Since 2025, she has also served on the Board of Directors of the American Association for Cancer Research.

=== Awards and honors ===
- 2000 National Institutes of Health Distinguished Clinical Teacher Award
- 2003, 2010 National Cancer Institute Director's Award
- 2005 American Society for Clinical Investigation Member
- 2006-2018 Best Doctors in America Member
- 2012 National Institutes of Health Great Teacher Lectureship
- 2013 Children's Hospital of Philadelphia Alexandra Scott Lectureship in Pediatric Oncology
- 2013 National Institutes of Health Director's Award
- 2015 National Institutes of Health G. Burroughs Mider Lectureship
- 2017 MD Anderson Cancer Center Warren Sutow Distinguished Lectureship
- 2018 Top 10 Clinical Research Award for New CAR-T Cell Therapy for Relapsed Leukemia
- 2019 American Academy of Dermatology Lila and Murray Gruber Memorial Cancer Research Award
- 2021 AACR-St. Baldrick's Foundation Award for Outstanding Achievement in Pediatric Cancer Research
- 2021 AACR Team Science Award to the St. Baldrick's-StandUp2Cancer Team
- 2021 Richard V. Smalley Award and Lectureship, The Society for the Immunotherapy of Cancer's "most prestigious award to a clinician/scientist and luminary in the field who has significantly contributed to the advancement of cancer immunotherapy research"
- 2021 American Society for Clinical Oncology Pediatric Oncology Award and Lecture
- 2022 Fellow, American Association for Cancer Research
- 2022 Nobility in Science Award, Sarcoma Foundation of America
- 2022 National Academy of Medicine
- 2023 George Stamatoyannopoulos Award Lecture, American Society for Gene and Cell Therapy
- 2023 Top 20 Most Influential Women in Biopharma, Endpoints News
- 2023 Fellow of the Academy of Immunooncology, Society for Immunotherapy of Cancer
- 2023 Edward Netter Leadership Award, Alliance for Cancer Gene Therapy
- 2024 Almanac of Women Leaders in Pediatric Oncology, International Society of Pediatric Oncology
- 2024 R. Lois Murphy Award, Memorial Sloan Kettering Cancer Center
- 2025 Lloyd Old Award, Cancer Research Institute/AACR for outstanding and innovative research that has had a major impact on the cancer field and has the potential to stimulate new directions in cancer immunology
- 2025 Italian-American Cancer Foundation Prize for Excellence in Medicine the Clinical Sciences, New York, NY

== Personal life ==
Mackall is a member of the LGBTQ+ community.
