= Altos Labs =

American biotechnology company

Altos Labs, Inc.
- Company type: Corporation
- Founded: 2022
- Key people: Hal Barron (CEO and co-chairman); Hans Bishop (co-chairman and president); Richard Klausner (co-chairman and CSO; Juan Carlos Izpisua Belmonte (founding scientist))
- Number of employees: 500
- Website: altoslabs.com

Altos Labs, Inc. is an American biotechnology research company. Altos Labs' goal is to develop life extension therapies based on induced pluripotent stem cells that can halt or reverse the human aging process. Russian-born technology businessman Yuri Milner, along with investors including Jeff Bezos, funded the company in 2021; operations started in 2022.

== History ==
Altos Labs was formally started on 19 January 2022. The name Altos Labs is based on the city of Los Altos in California. The idea for Altos Labs originated with cell biologist and entrepreneur Richard D. Klausner, who co-founded the company with Hans Bishop.

In 2021, Altos Labs was registered in the United States and the United Kingdom. It will operate out of California (U.S.) and Cambridge (U.K.), with some work performed in Japan.

=== Investors ===
One of the early investors of Altos Labs is an investment vehicle held for the benefit of the Breakthrough Foundation, founded by Russian-Israeli science and technology investor and philanthropist Yuri Milner and his wife Julia. The foundation supports existing and future philanthropic projects in fundamental sciences. Milner had previously shown interest in anti-aging technologies, in October 2020, he co-hosted a meeting where experts presented their research, reported on animal testing, and the concept for Altos Labs was developed.

Altos Labs raised US$3 billion in a funding round from investors in January 2022. It is said to be the best funded biotech start-up to date. Investors reportedly include Amazon founder Jeff Bezos and ARCH Venture Partners founder Robert Nelsen.

Salaries for principal investigators at Altos Labs may be ten times higher than at comparable research institutions.

=== Facilities ===
Altos Labs plans to establish research facilities in Cambridge, the San Francisco Bay Area, and in San Diego as a first step.

=== Mission ===
Atypical of a private company, the initial focus will be on basic research without immediate prospects of a commercially viable product.

In January 2022, the company's president, Hans Bishop, argued that Altos Labs was working on increasing the "healthspan" of humans and that longevity extension would only be "an accidental consequence".

== See also ==
- Verily
- Calico
- SENS Research Foundation
- Human Longevity
- Life extension
