= Calico (company) =

American biotechnology company

Calico Life Sciences LLC
- Type: Subsidiary
- Industry: Health care; Biotechnology
- Founded: September 18, 2013; 13 years ago
- Founder: Bill Maris
- Headquarters: South San Francisco, California, United States
- Area served: Worldwide
- Key people: Arthur D. Levinson (CEO)
- Number of employees: 375 (2025)
- Parent: Google (2013–2015); Alphabet Inc. (2015–present)
- Website: calicolabs.com

Calico Life Sciences LLC is an American biotechnology company with a focus on the biology of aging, attempting to devise interventions that may enable people to lead longer and healthier lives. It is a subsidiary of Alphabet Inc.

== History ==
Calico, short for the California Life Company, was announced on September 18, 2013, prior to Google's restructuring and was founded by former GV CEO Bill Maris. In Google's 2013 Founders Letter, Larry Page described Calico as a company focused on "health, well-being, and longevity." It was incorporated into Alphabet with Google's other sister divisions in 2015.

=== Calico team ===
The Calico team has included a number of pioneering researchers in the field of aging research, including members of the National Academy of Sciences, Cynthia Kenyon and Daniel E. Gottschling. Some of the company’s earliest employees included the geneticist David Botstein, and cancer drug developer Robert L. Cohen, Eric Verdin, CEO of the Buck Institute for Research on Aging, served as a consultant to the Calico team.

At the end of 2017 and the beginning of 2018, Calico lost two top scientists; in December 2017 Hal Barron, its head of R&D, left for GlaxoSmithKline, and in March 2018 chief computing officer Daphne Koller, who was leading their computational biology efforts, left to pursue a venture in applying machine learning techniques to drug design.

== Partnerships ==
In September 2014, Calico and AbbVie announced an R&D collaboration focused on aging and age-related diseases such as neurodegeneration and cancer. The partnership was extended in 2021.AbbVie terminated the collaboration in November 2025, a few months after the companies announced the failure of fosigotifator in a Phase II/III trial for ALS. By that time Abbvie had invested around $1.75 billion dollars, and two compounds arising from the collaboration were still in development by Calico: ABBV-CLS-484, a PTPN2/N1 phosphatase inhibitor and a potential cancer drug, and ABBV-CLS-628, a monoclonal antibody against pappalysin-1 that was in Phase II testing for autosomal dominant polycystic kidney disease.

In 2015, the Broad Institute of MIT and Harvard announced a partnership with Calico to "advance research on age-related diseases and therapeutics", a further partnership also was announced with the Buck Institute for Research on Aging. Also in 2015, Calico announced a partnership with QB3 based on researching the biology of aging and identifying potential therapeutics for age-related diseases and one with AncestryDNA based on conducting research into the genetics of human lifespan.

== Reception ==
When Calico was formed, Google did not disclose many details, such as whether the company would focus on biology or information technology. The company issued press releases about research partnerships, but not details regarding the results of its research or the specifics of what it was working on. This led to frustration by researchers regarding Calico's secrecy and questions as to whether Calico had produced any useful scientific advancements. Calico said the business's purpose was to focus on long-term science not expected to garner results for 10 or more years, leaving nothing to report on in its first five years.

== See also ==
- Verily
- Altos Labs
- SENS Research Foundation
- Human Longevity
- Life extension
