= Anat Ashkenazi =

Chief Financial Officer of Alphabet Inc.

Anat Ashkenazi (Hebrew: ענת אשכנזי) is an Israeli-American business executive and is current chief financial officer of Alphabet Inc. and its subsidiary Google. She had previously worked at Eli Lilly and Company since 2001, finishing as CFO there. Lilly's market cap tripled during her three year tenure as CFO. In 2025, Ashkenazi was ranked 51 on a list of most powerful women by Fortune.

== Early life and career ==
An Israeli-American, Ashkenazi earned a degree in finance and economics from the Hebrew University of Jerusalem and an MBA from Tel Aviv University. She worked in the financial services sector in Israel, including for Ma'alot Standard & Poor's and Bank Hapoalim.

== Eli Lilly and Company ==
Ashkenazi spent 23 years in Eli Lilly in finance positions for several departments including as CFO of the global oncology division, the global diabetes division and the Lilly Research Laboratories overall, before becoming CFO for Eli Lilly and Company During Ashkenazi's tenureship as CFO, Eli Lilly successfully introduced a line of GLP-1 agonists based on tirzepatide under the brand names Mounjaro and Zepbound, which were immensely popular and financially successful. As CFO, Ashkenazi took steps to massively scale up production of these medications to ensure capacity matched demand.
