= Hellín =

- Municipality
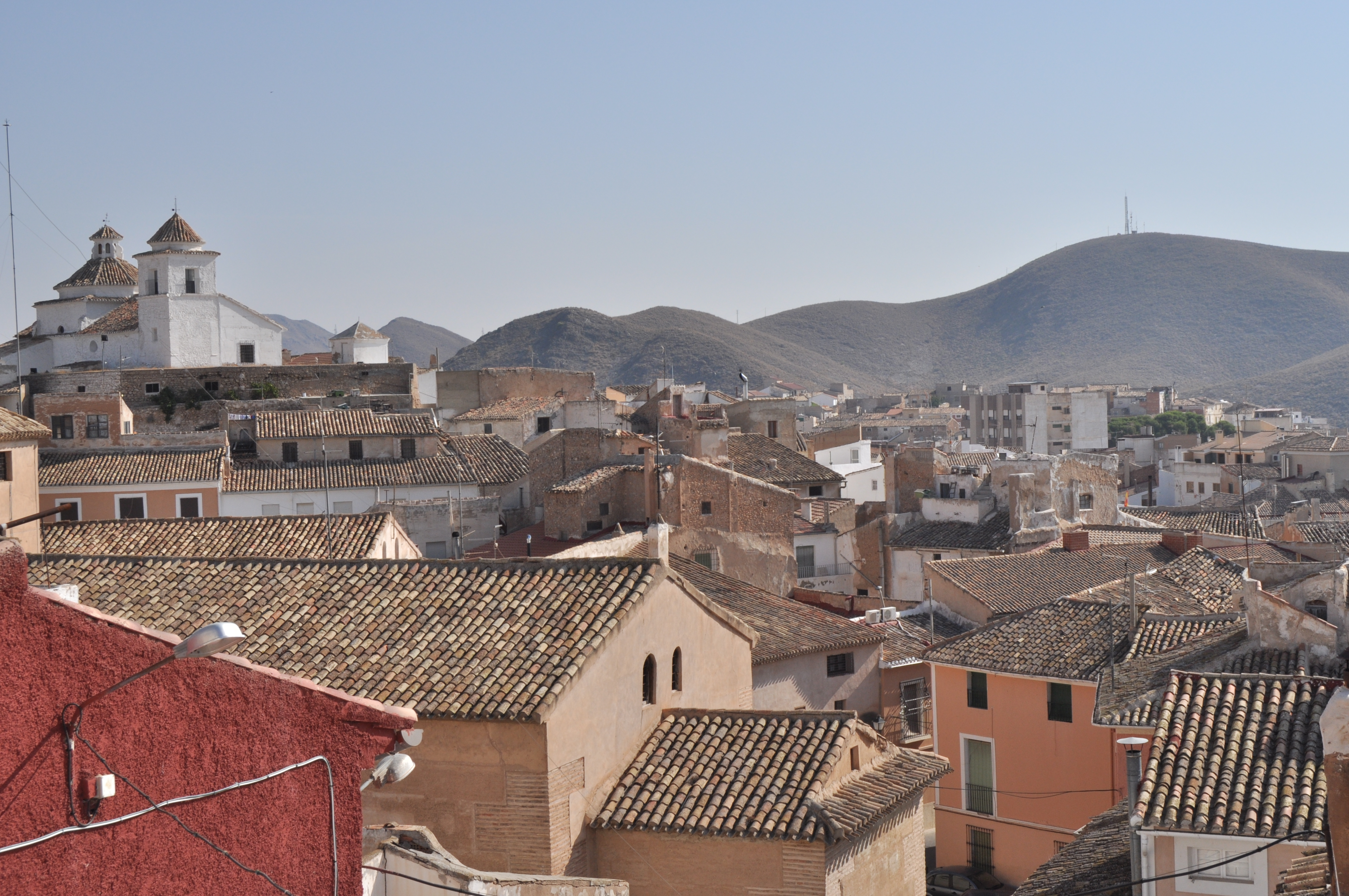

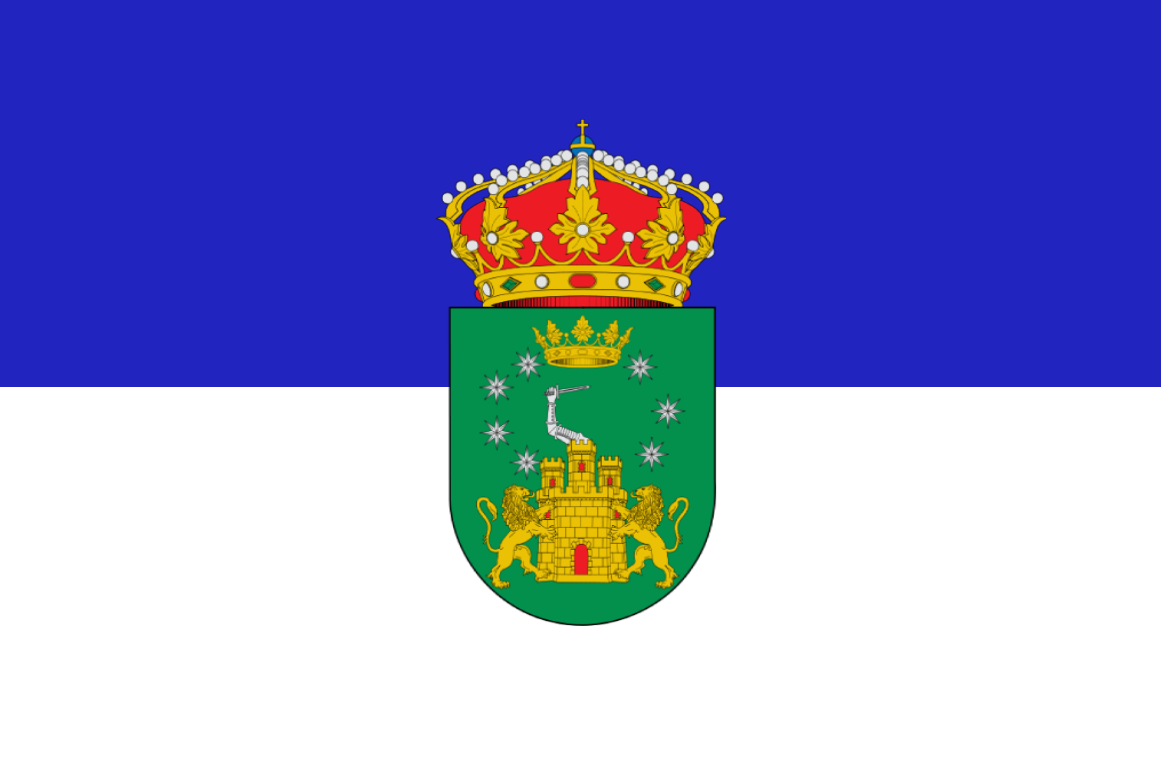
- Flag Coat of arms

- Location within Castilla-La Mancha Location within Province of Albacete Location within Spain
- Coordinates: 38°31′0″N 1°41′00″W
- Country: Spain
- Autonomous community: Castilla–La Mancha
- Province: Albacete

Government
  - Mayor: Ramón García Rodríguez (PSOE-CLM)

Area
  - Total: 781.66 km^{2} (301.80 sq mi)
- Elevation: 555 m (1,821 ft)

Population (2025-01-01)
  - Total: 30,836
  - Density: 39.449/km^{2} (102.17/sq mi)
- Demonym: Hellineros or ilunenses
- Time zone: UTC+1 (CET)
  - Summer (DST): UTC+2 (CEST)
- Postal code: 02400
- Website: Official website

Hellín is a city and municipality of Spain located in the province of Albacete, Castilla–La Mancha. The municipality spans across a total area of 781.66 km^{2}. As of 1 January 2020, it has a population of 30,200, which makes it the second largest municipality in the province. It belongs to the comarca of Campos de Hellín.

== History ==
There is an archaeological site at Tolmo de Minateda hill near Hellín, with phases of Iberian, Roman and Visigoth occupation. There are archaeological evidences suggesting that the Minateda site may have stood at some point at the Byzantine side of the limes. A tentative identification with the Iyih mentioned in the Pact of Theodemir has been also proposed. Minateda was thus probably known as Madinat Iyyuh during the Islamic period. The Arabic name of Hellín was however Falyān, which eventually evolved into 'Felín', and then 'Hellín'.

The importance of the Sulfur-rich mining district in the south of the municipality led to the creation of a mining community in the area (Las Minas), that became a leading producer of sulfur in southwestern Europe during the 18th and 19th centuries.

Railway arrived in the town in 1864, with the opening of the Chinchilla–Hellín stretch on 18 January and the Hellín–Agramón stretch on 8 October.

Hellín was granted the title of city (ciudad) in 1898. Esparto cultivation increased in the first decades of the 20th century, peaking in importance during the Autarky period of the Francoist dictatorship, with the expansion of irrigated crops.

== Culture ==
Main celebrations, such as the processions and the traditional tamborada (drumming), declared of international tourist interest, occur during the Holy Week (in Spanish, Semana Santa).

== Climate ==
Hellín has a cold semi-arid climate (BSk on the Köppen climate classification) with mild winters, hot summers and scarce precipitation throughout the year. Winters are milder compared to the western regions of the province, as its lower altitude contributes to milder temperatures in winter and warmer temperatures in summer. Furthermore, its location in the southeast of the Meseta Central contributes to greater aridity, being one of the driest areas of Castilla–La Mancha. Hellín recorded the highest temperature ever recorded in Spain during a month of February, which was 33.8 °C (92.8 °F).

Climate data for Hellín (1997–2025), extremes (1987-present)
| Month | Jan | Feb | Mar | Apr | May | Jun | Jul | Aug | Sep | Oct | Nov | Dec | Year |
|---|---|---|---|---|---|---|---|---|---|---|---|---|---|
| Record high °C (°F) | 27.7 (81.9) | 33.8 (92.8) | 32.3 (90.1) | 32.1 (89.8) | 38.5 (101.3) | 41.6 (106.9) | 44.5 (112.1) | 45.4 (113.7) | 41.3 (106.3) | 37.4 (99.3) | 28.4 (83.1) | 24.9 (76.8) | 45.4 (113.7) |
| Mean daily maximum °C (°F) | 13.5 (56.3) | 15.7 (60.3) | 18.0 (64.4) | 20.5 (68.9) | 25.3 (77.5) | 30.6 (87.1) | 34.8 (94.6) | 33.8 (92.8) | 28.9 (84.0) | 23.7 (74.7) | 17.0 (62.6) | 14.5 (58.1) | 23.0 (73.4) |
| Daily mean °C (°F) | 8.8 (47.8) | 10.2 (50.4) | 12.3 (54.1) | 14.6 (58.3) | 18.8 (65.8) | 23.5 (74.3) | 27.1 (80.8) | 26.6 (79.9) | 22.7 (72.9) | 18.3 (64.9) | 12.4 (54.3) | 9.8 (49.6) | 17.1 (62.8) |
| Mean daily minimum °C (°F) | 4.1 (39.4) | 4.8 (40.6) | 6.6 (43.9) | 8.6 (47.5) | 12.3 (54.1) | 16.4 (61.5) | 19.5 (67.1) | 19.4 (66.9) | 16.4 (61.5) | 12.8 (55.0) | 7.8 (46.0) | 5.0 (41.0) | 11.1 (52.0) |
| Record low °C (°F) | −7.2 (19.0) | −5.5 (22.1) | −3.8 (25.2) | −0.1 (31.8) | 3.4 (38.1) | 9.6 (49.3) | 10.5 (50.9) | 12.9 (55.2) | 6.9 (44.4) | 3.4 (38.1) | −6.1 (21.0) | −4.6 (23.7) | −7.2 (19.0) |
| Average precipitation mm (inches) | 19.3 (0.76) | 13.1 (0.52) | 53.9 (2.12) | 44.8 (1.76) | 42.4 (1.67) | 20.8 (0.82) | 6.5 (0.26) | 17.4 (0.69) | 45.5 (1.79) | 33.0 (1.30) | 35.3 (1.39) | 22.3 (0.88) | 354.3 (13.96) |
Source: Agencia Estatal de Meteorologia

== Main sights ==
- Church of la Asunción

== Notable people ==
- Maria Baldó i Massanet (1884–1964), teacher, feminist, folklorist, and liberal politician
- Ginés de Boluda, composer
- Juan Carlos Izpisua Belmonte, biochemist & pharmacologist
- Josico, footballer
- Manuel Castells, sociologist

== Twinned cities ==
- Paysandú, Uruguay
- Rivello, Italy
- Nagykanizsa, Hungary
