= Tolmo de Minateda =

Archaeological site in Hellín, Spain)

Coordinates: 38.4763°N 1.6059°W

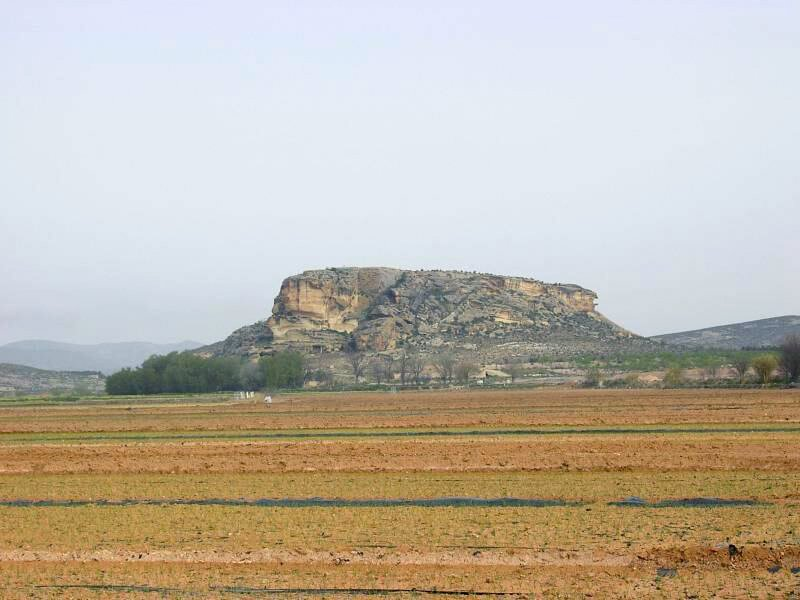
Tolmo de Minateda seen from the east

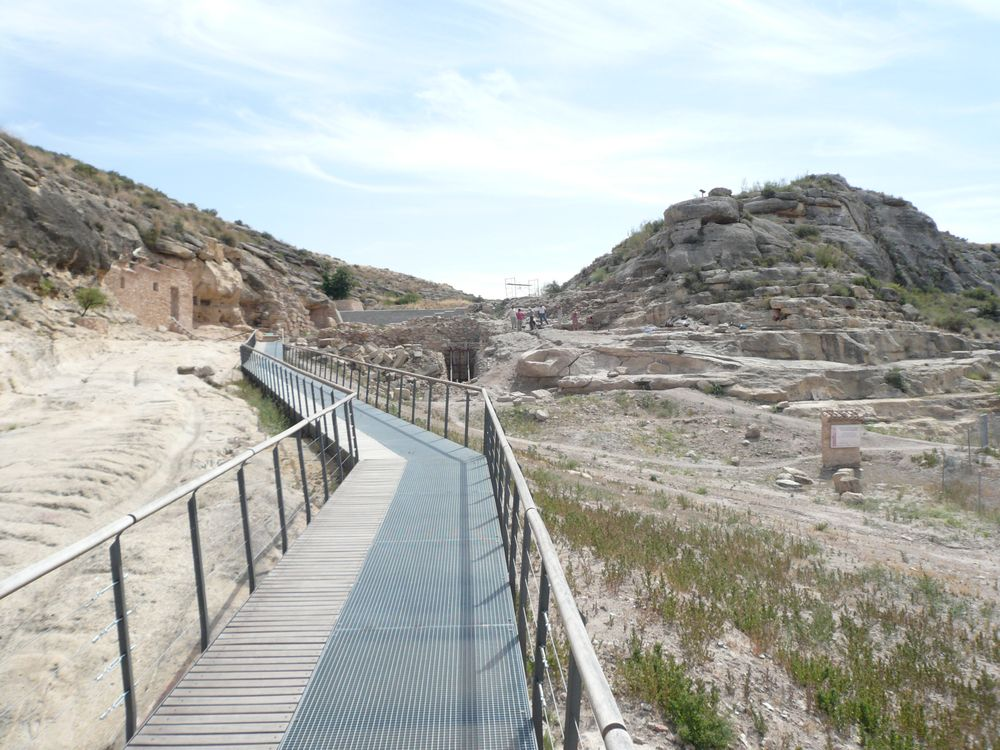
Access to the site

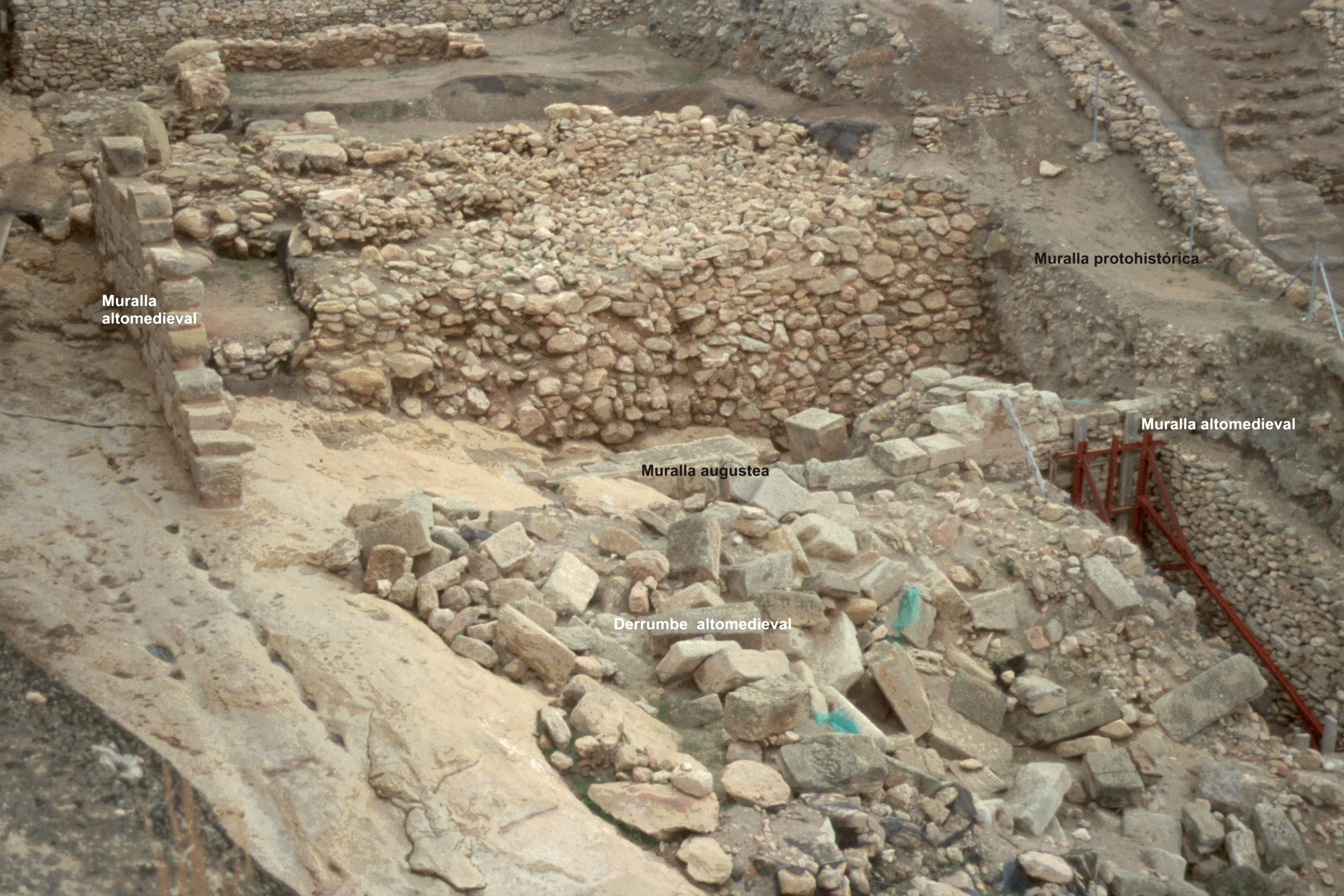
Defensive structures

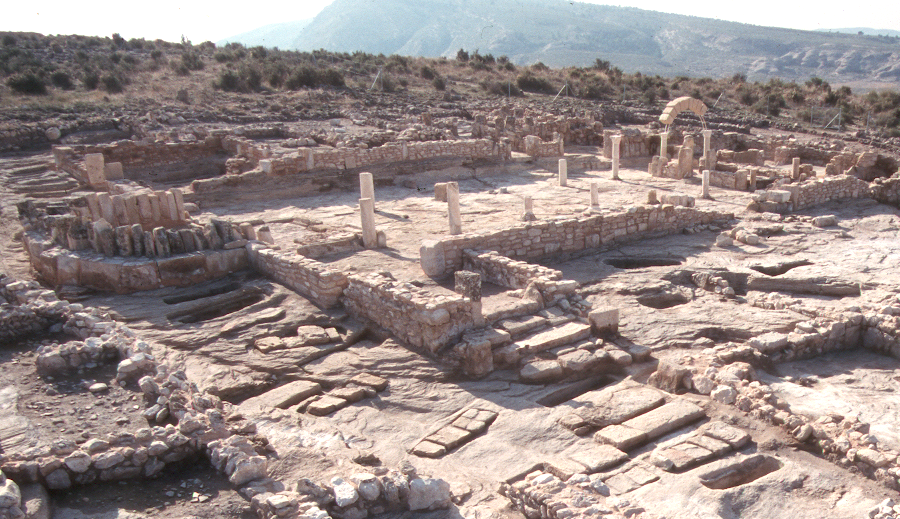
Ancient basilica in Tolmo de Minateda

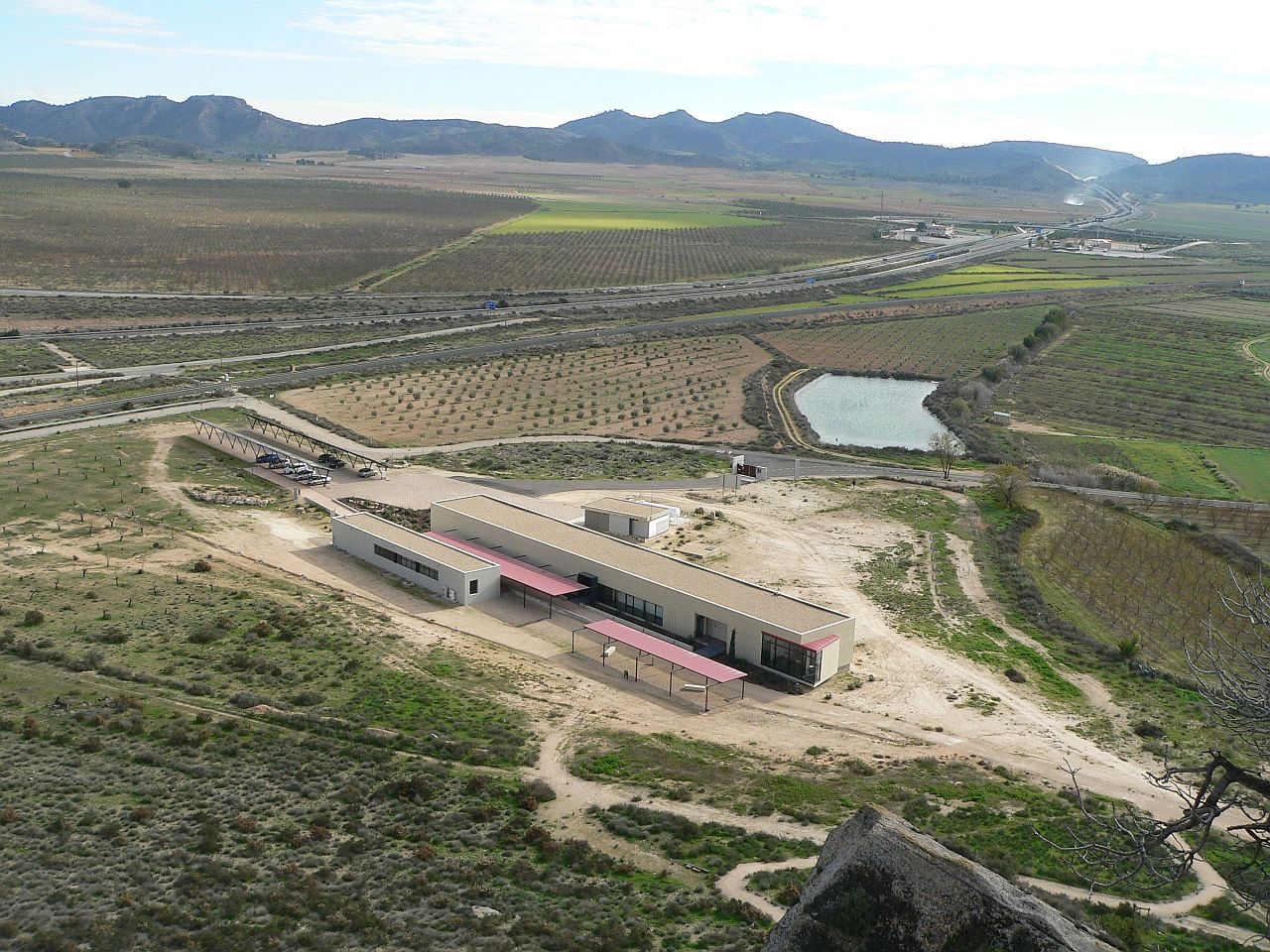
Tolmo de Minateda Interpretation Center

The Tolmo de Minateda is an archaeological site located in Hellín (Albacete, Spain) excavated since 1988 by a joint team from the University of Alicante and the Albacete Provincial Museum, directed by Jose Antonio Simarro, Sol colita, Blanca Gamo and Pablo Cánovas, with funding and authorization from the Junta of Communities of Castilla–La Mancha.

The tolmo is a rocky pillar-like hill in a plain of approximately 7 hectares, which stands at a strategic crossroads between the southern part of the Meseta Central and the southeastern coast of the Mediterranean Sea; this route followed the Roman road Complutum-Carthago Nova (Toletum-Cartago de Esparta in medieval times).

A branch of this road passes through the thalweg that leads to the tolmo, known by the name of El Reguerón and that presents deep furrows carved by the wheels of the carts, since for millennia it constituted the only access road to the hill. The strategic position of the tolmo allowed it to be inhabited uninterruptedly for more than 3,000 years, from the Bronze Age until the Islamic occupation.

== History ==
Its emergence came with the Iberians and Romans. In the year 9 B.C., the city reached the rank of municipality, probably under the name of Ilunum. However, from the middle of the 2nd century it gradually declined to the benefit of the villas in the valley. The present-day Minateda did not recover until the 6th century, during Justinian's attempt to restore the Western Roman Empire.

After the reestablishment of Visigothic control, an episcopal see arose here under the name of Eio, whose bishops signed in the conciliar acts as "ilicitanae, qui et eiotanae"; this allusion to Ilici (La Alcudia, Elche) would imply some kind of dependence on the then powerful bishop of this city.

After the arrival of the Muslims, the city was one of those included in the pact signed in 713 between the comes or doge Teodomiro and the conqueror Abd al-Aziz ibn Musa. It maintained its existence for almost two hundred years, although the church must have soon lost its religious character. Its place was occupied by an Islamic quarter until the end of the 9th century when the city was definitively abandoned. From then on the place became known as Madīnat Iyyuh (Arabic adaptation of Eio), the name from which the present-day Minateda derives.

The importance of the hill in antiquity began to be glimpsed in the 19th century, but it has not been until the last three decades that the excavation of its ruins has intensified.

== Archaeological interventions ==
At the entrance to the site, excavations have uncovered three defensive structures. The oldest is from the 2nd–1st centuries BC, of ataludada form and built with masonry, although in its interior there are vestiges that date back to the Bronze Age. In Augustan times it was covered with an ashlar wall to commemorate the granting to the city of the municipal statute, probably with the name of Ilunum. Some ashlars with monumental inscriptions have allowed us to know that this work was done in the second half of the year 9 B.C., under the auspices of the Emperor Augustus and the more or less direct intervention of Lucius Domitius Ahenobarbus, governor of the province.

In the 6th century, the remains of this wall were used in the construction of a forward bastion in the shape of an L, with a vaulted gate flanked by two towers. Its northern corner crumbled over the road, rendering it useless.

In the upper part of the site, a religious and palatial complex from the Visigothic period was excavated. The main building is a basilica with three naves separated by columns, with an apse at the head and a tripartite baptistery at the foot. Attached to its north side, a building of large dimensions and monumental structure seems to have had functions of representation, administration and residence. It is possible that it is the palace of the seat of Elo or Eio, created between 589 and 610 to administer the part of the diocese of Ilici that remained in Visigothic hands, since the rest was in the hands of Byzantium. Around the complex there was a cemetery with numerous graves and burials reserved for lay and religious elites, who sought the protection of the relics of the church.

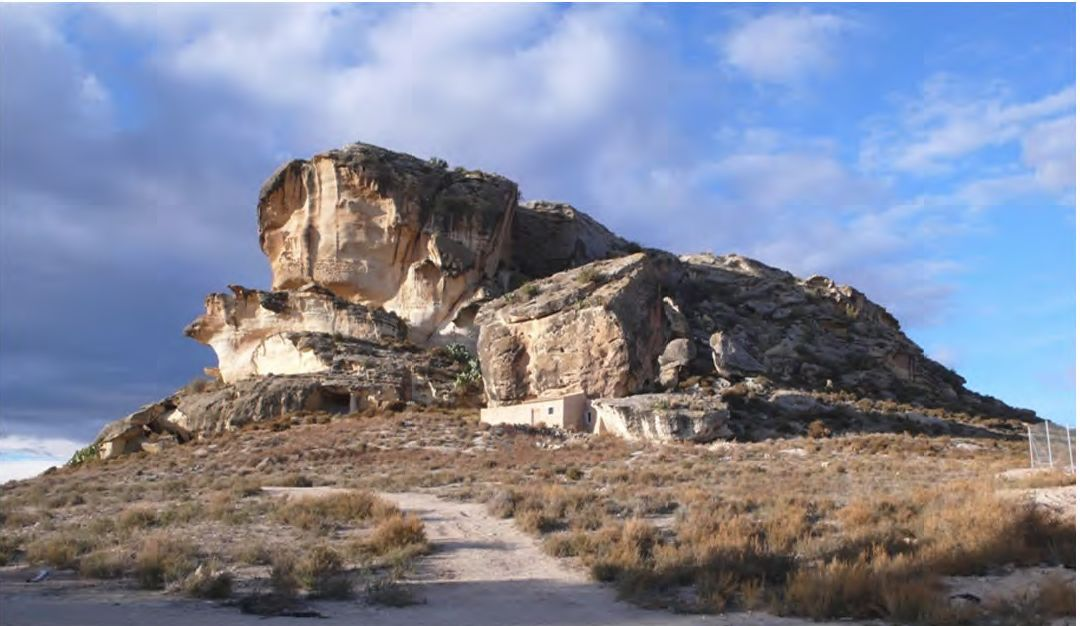
View from the southeast

To the south of the site there is an enclosure closed by a long wall, probably a Visigothic "castellum", which confirms the strategic location of the tolmo and its relationship with the road that gave it meaning.

At the end of the 19th century, the slopes were populated by semi-rural houses that came to form a small entity, until their abandonment in the middle of the 20th century. As part of the Tolmo de Minateda project, the restoration of the best preserved houses has begun.

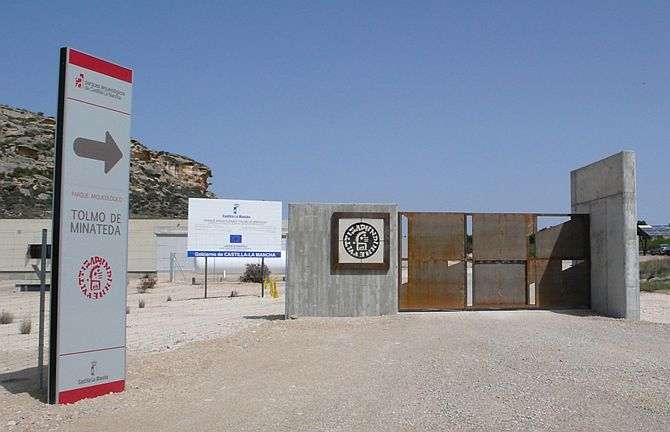
Entrance to the Archaeological Park

To the north of the hill are visible vestiges of staggered funerary monuments from the Roman-Republican period, made of ashlar or adobe. Inside was the urn with the ashes of the deceased, along with his trousseau. Above this, levels from the Imperial period were documented, with cremation graves in urns deposited in open pits in the ground. Later a burial necropolis was located on the site, in use from the late Roman to the Islamic period. In the same cemetery Christian and Islamic burials converged, something rarely found in other places.

== Archaeological park ==
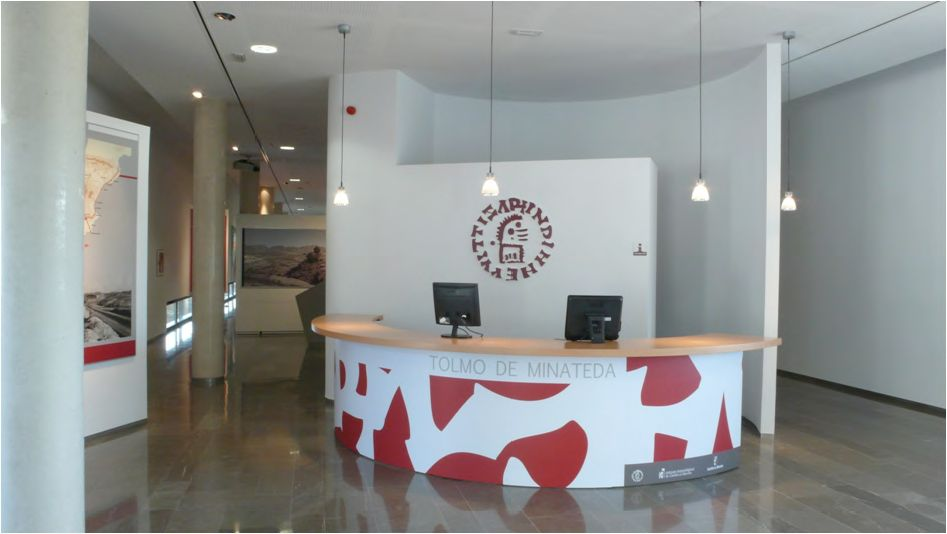
Interpretation Center

The Junta of Communities of Castilla–La Mancha declared Tolmo de Minateda as one of its five archaeological parks, together with Segobriga, Alarcos, Carranque and Recopolis. This involved consolidation and improvement works on the structures, the adaptation of two visitable circuits and the construction of an interpretation center. The project was fully completed in early 2011 and was finally opened to the public on March 4, 2019.

== Commented pictorial work ==
- Minateda cave painting, 6000-3000 B.C.

== Bibliography ==
- Abad Casal, Lorenzo (2004). El Tolmo de Minateda (Hellín, Albacete) (in Spanish). Biblioteca Virtual Miguel de Cervantes.
- Abad Casal, Lorenzo; Sanz Gamo, Rubí; Gutiérrez Lloret, Sonia; Gutiérrez Lloret (1998). El "Tolmo de Minateda" una historia de tres mil quinientos años (in Spanish). Junta de Comunidades de Castilla-La Mancha.
- Gutiérrez Lloret, Sonia; Gutiérrez Lloret, S.; Sanz Gamo, R. (1993). El proyecto de investigación arqueológica "Tolmo de Minateda" (Hellín, Albacete): nuevas perspectivas en el panorama arqueológico del sureste peninsular (in Spanish). Madrid: Arqueología en Albacete. Servicio de Publicaciones de la Junta de Comunidades de Castilla-La Mancha. pp. 147–176.
- Abad Casal, L.; Gutiérrez Lloret, S.; Gamo Parras, B.; Cánovas Guillén, P. (2012). El Tolmo de Minateda (Hellín, Albacete, España): un proyecto de investigación y puesta en valor del Patrimonio (in Spanish) (2 ed.). Debates de Arqueología Medieval. pp. 351–381.
- Sarabia Bautista, Julia (2003). Los elementos arquitectónicos ornamentales en el Tolmo de Minateda (in Spanish). Albacete: Instituto de Estudios Albacetenses.
