= Richard Klausner =

American scientist

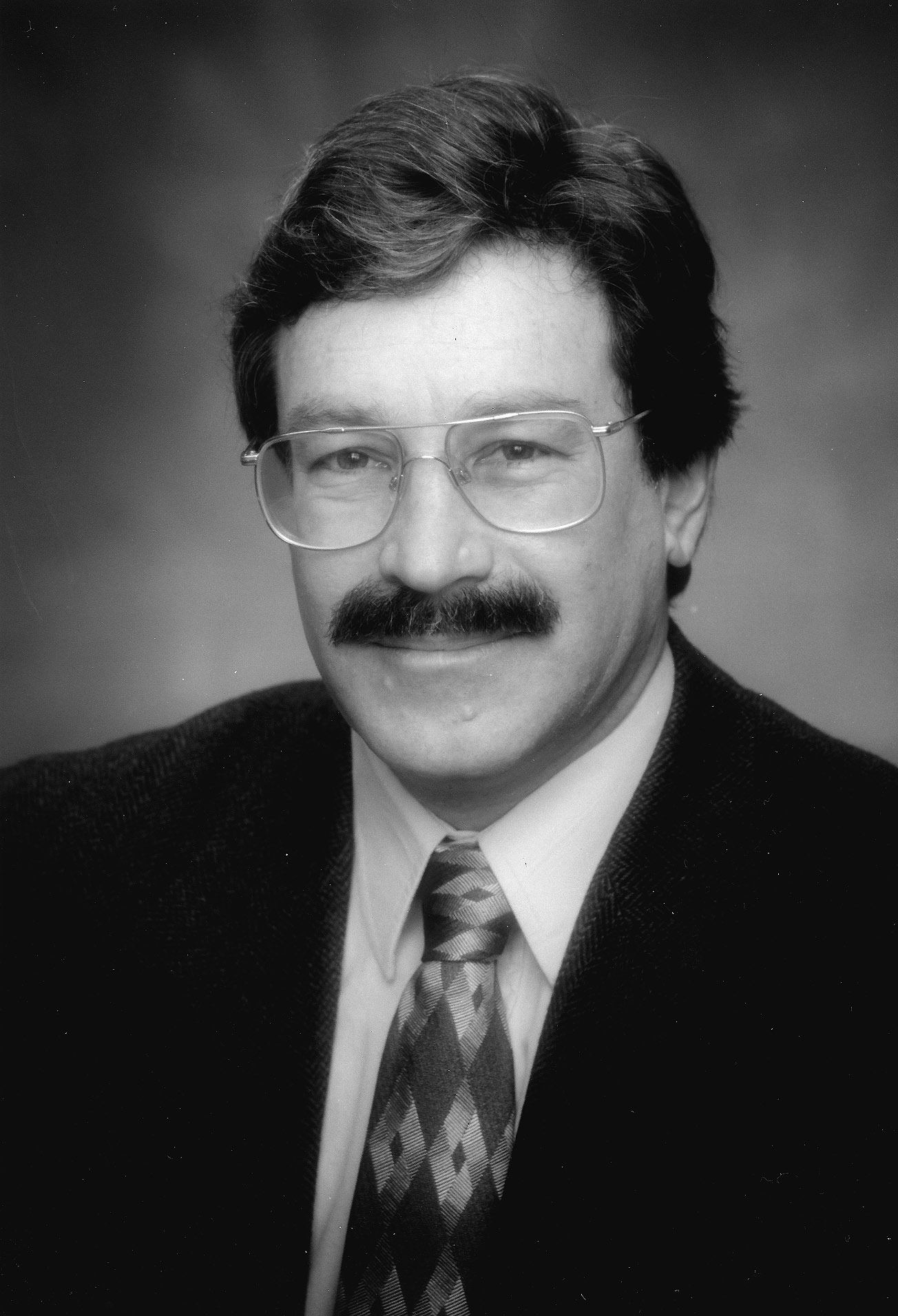

11th Director of the National Cancer Institute
- In office August 1, 1995 – September 30, 2001
- President: Bill Clinton; George W. Bush
- Preceded by: Samuel Broder
- Succeeded by: Andrew C. von Eschenbach

Personal details
- Children: 4
- Scientific career
- Education: Yale University; Duke Medical School
- Workplaces: National Institutes of Health; Case Foundation; Bill & Melinda Gates Foundation; Juno Therapeutics; GRAIL; Illumina; Altos Labs, Inc.

Richard Daniel Klausner is an American scientist who served as the 11th director of the National Cancer Institute of the United States.

== Early life and education ==
Klausner was born in 1950 or 1951. His father was a chemist, and Klausner would visit his father's laboratory as a child. He began studying physics at Yale University, but changed his focus to biology, with the plan of becoming a doctor in a rural area. Klausner received his MD from Duke Medical School in 1976.

== Career ==
In 1979, Klausner joined the National Institutes of Health (NIH) as a postdoctoral fellow. At age 30, Klausner was appointed to the chief of the cell biology and metabolism branch of the National Institute of Child Health and Human Development.

In 1992, he directed the review of the NIH's intramural research programs, in which he recommended sweeping changes. He served as the director of the National Cancer Institute from 1995 to 2001, where he managed a staff of 5,000 employees and a budget of $4.5 billion. In total, he spent more than 20 years at the NIH.

He left the NCI to become the founding director of the Case Institute of Health, Science and Technology of the Case Foundation.

He was the managing partner of the biotech venture capital firm, the Column Group. From 2002 to 2005, he was the executive director of the Bill & Melinda Gates Foundation.

He was a member of the Searle Scholars advisory board. He was a scientific advisor at the Fred Hutchinson Cancer Research Center. He has been an Advisor to the Presidents of the Academies for counter-terrorism and a liaison to the White House Office of Science & Technology Policy, and was the chief strategy advisor for USAID.

Klausner co-founded Juno Therapeutics in 2013, MindStrong Health in 2014, GRAIL in 2015, and Lyell Immunopharma in 2018. He was the chief medical officer of Illumina from 2013 to 2016.

In 2022, Klausner co-founded Altos Labs and is currently Chief Scientist and Board Co-Chairman of the company.

He was president of the American Society for Clinical Investigation from 1995 to 1996.

=== Research ===
His research focused on T cells and the potential for CAR-T therapies. He also has published research on the genetics of Von Hippel–Lindau disease, a condition which predisposes a person to developing cancer. He is an author of more than 300 scientific articles.

== Personal life ==
Klausner has two sons and twin daughters.

== Awards ==
- 1986 Elected to the American Society for Clinical Investigation (ASCI)
- 1993 Elected to the National Academy of Sciences
- 1995 Elected to the American Academy of Arts and Sciences
- 1997 Dickson Prize in Medicine, University of Pittsburgh
- 1998 Raymond Bourgine Award for Excellence in Cancer Research and Gold Medal of Paris
- 1999 ASCI Stanley J. Korsmeyer Award
- 2000 Medal of Honour, International Agency for Research on Cancer
- 2018 Elected fellow of the American Association for Cancer Research
