= Human Longevity =

American venture company

Human Longevity, Inc. is a San Diego–based venture launched by Craig Venter, Robert Hariri and Peter Diamandis in 2013. Its goal is to build the world's most comprehensive database on human genotypes and phenotypes, and then subject it to machine learning so that it can help develop new ways to fight diseases associated with aging. The company received US$80 million in investments in its Series A offering in summer 2014 and announced a further $220 million Series B investment offering in April 2016. It has made deals with drug companies Celgene and AstraZeneca to collaborate in its research.

== Overview ==
While it is conducting research, the company is offering a wellness service known as "Health Nucleus," which offers customers a range of medical tests such as a full genome sequencing and tests for early indications of cancers, Alzheimer's and heart disease. This testing is meant to help people catch diseases earlier than otherwise possible and to identify risk factors for diseases later in life.

At the start of 2017, the company hired Cynthia Collins from GE Healthcare, and Venter became Executive Chair. The company's chief operating officer, Mark Winham, left the company in mid-2017, and Collins and the company's chief medical officer, Brad Perkins, left in December. Venter stepped back into the CEO role, but announced in May 2018 that he was leaving the company to return to the J. Craig Venter Institute. Venter was sued for allegedly 'stealing trade secrets' at Human Longevity. The case has been dismissed.

In July 2019, Dr. Wei-Wu He, a molecular biologist and biotech entrepreneur who founded OriGene Technologies, was appointed Executive Chairman of Human Longevity, Inc.

In November 2019, Human Longevity closed $30 million financing from Emerging Technology Partners (ETP) and other leading healthcare investors to renew its commitment to longevity and precision health.

In November 2019, C. Thomas Caskey, professor of molecular & human genetics at the Baylor College of Medicine, joined the company as Chief Medical Officer.

In January 2020, Human Longevity published a study in the journal Proceedings of the National Academy of Sciences (PNAS) that showed that by integrating whole-genome sequencing with advanced imaging and blood metabolites, clinicians identified adults at risk for key health conditions.

In June 2020, Human Longevity launched a proprietary program called 100+ longevity program. The program claims to combine the most advanced technologies with a dedicated medical team to help people achieve their healthiest and longest life.

In June 2022, Human Longevity announced an initial public offering through a SPAC, with a valuation of $1 billion.

== See also ==
- Altos Labs
- Calico
- SENS Research Foundation
- Life extension
