= Juan Carlos Izpisua Belmonte =

Spanish biochemist and developmental biologist

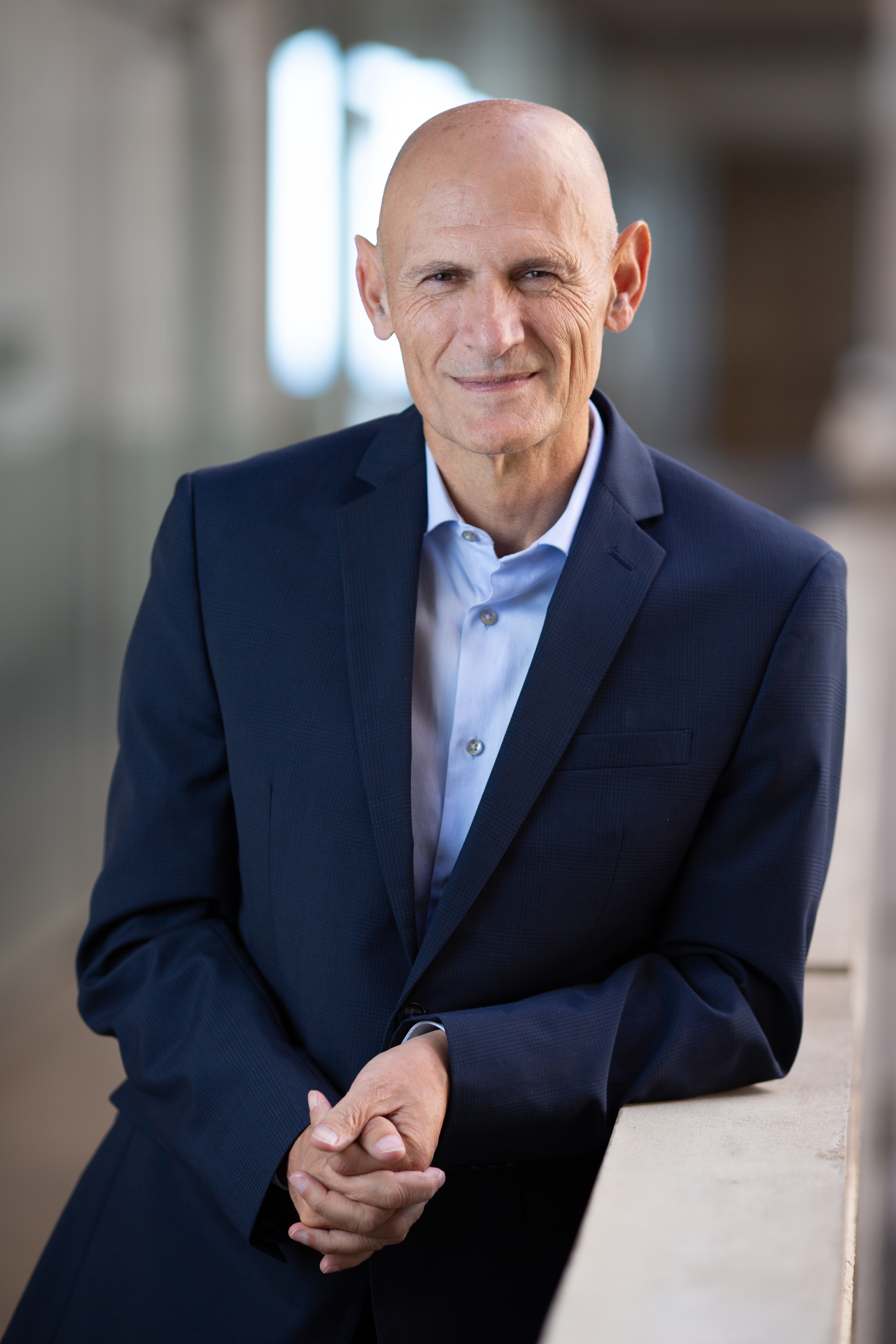
- Born: 1960 (age 65–66); Hellín, Albacete, Spain
- Education: University of Valencia; University of Bologna
- Scientific career
- Fields: Biochemistry

Juan Carlos Izpisua Belmonte (born December 12, 1960, in Hellín, Albacete) is a Spanish biochemist and developmental biologist. He is a professor in the Gene Expression Laboratories at the Salk Institute for Biological Studies in La Jolla, California, US since 1993 and a Founding Scientist, Senior Vice President and institute director at Altos Labs.

== Education ==
Izpisua Belmonte graduated from the University of Valencia, Spain with a bachelor's degree in Pharmacy and Science. He then earned a master's degree in pharmacology from the same university before moving on to complete his Ph.D. in Biochemistry and Pharmacology at the University of Bologna, Italy and the University of Valencia, Spain. He followed that with a stage as a postdoctoral fellow in different institutions, including the University of Marburg, Germany and the European Molecular Biology Laboratory (EMBL), in Heidelberg, Germany and University of California, Los Angeles (UCLA), Los Angeles, USA prior to moving to the Salk Institute in 1993.

== Career ==
In 2004, Izpisua Belmonte helped to establish the Center for Regenerative Medicine in Barcelona and was its Director between 2004 and 2014.

He works as a specialist at Altos Labs. In 2023, due to the interest generated by his work, one of his presentations in Boston drew such a large crowd that it violated the fire code and was reduced by the police. A biologist has cautioned against "hype" and recommended waiting for more scientific publications.

His work includes research on the genomic mechanisms of aging, among various other topics.

== Research and claims ==
Izpisua Belmonte's work in the areas of biomedicine and regenerative medicine may help discover new molecules and specific gene or cell treatments to prevent and cure diseases affecting mankind both in the adult and embryonic stages. He has been involved in tissue and organ regeneration in humans. His work may also contribute to increased knowledge of aging and aging-associated diseases, thereby leading to healthier aging and increased lifespan.

His conceptual discoveries and methodologies for regenerative medicine include:

- Elucidating some of the key cellular and molecular bases of how an organism with millions of cells develops from a single cell embryo after fertilization.
- Seminal discoveries towards understanding the molecular basis underlying somatic cell reprogramming
- New methodologies for the differentiation of human stem cells into various cells types and organoids, like the kidney and heart.
- Development of novel stem cell models of human aging and aging-associated diseases, and discovery of new drivers of rejuvenation.
- Novel genetic and epigenetic technologies to both treat, and prevent the transmission, of mitochondrial and nuclear DNA originated diseases.
- Proof of concept that iPSC technology can be used for the generation of disease corrected patient specific cells with potential value for cell therapy.
- The development of methodologies for culturing embryos, including non-human primates, and creating synthetic mammalian embryos.
- Development of technologies that allow differentiation of human cells inside embryos of different species. These results may allow for the generation of human tissues and organs.

== Recognition ==
A secondary school, Instituto Enseñanza Secundaria (IES) Izpisua Belmonte, was named after Izpisua Belmonte in his hometown of Hellín, Albacete, Spain. In October, 2018, he was named by Time Magazine as one of the 50 Most Influential People in Healthcare of 2018. Twice his work was among those selected by Science as the "Breakthrough of the Year," in 2008 for reprogramming and again in 2013 for the generation of mini-organs.

== See also ==
- Chimera (genetics)
- Gene therapy
- Genome editing
- Regeneration
- Xenotransplantation
