= Church of la Asunción (Hellín) =

- Iglesia Parroquial de la Asunción (Spanish)
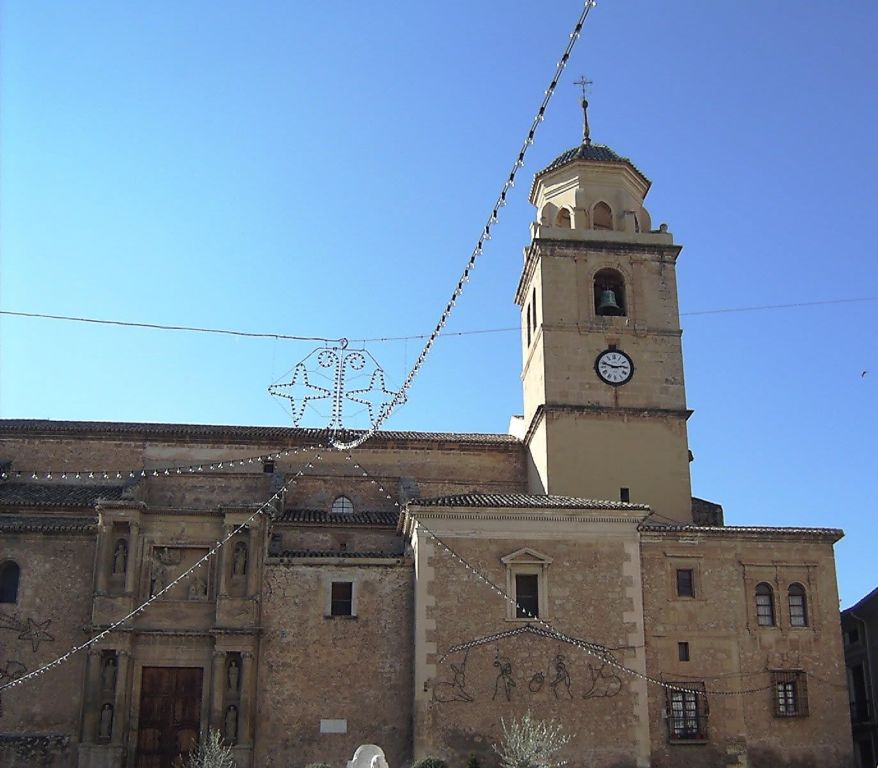

- Location within Spain
- 38.511964°N 1.703088°W
- Location: Hellín, Spain

Spanish Cultural Heritage
- Official name: Iglesia Parroquial de la Asunción
- Type: Non-movable
- Criteria: Monument
- Designated: 1981
- Reference no.: RI-51-0004538

The Church of la Asunción (Spanish: Iglesia Parroquial de Santa María de la Asunción) is a Renaissance-style, Roman Catholic church located in Hellín, Spain. It was declared Bien de Interés Cultural in 1981.

The church was erected in the 16th century. The chapels were refurbished in various styles and centuries. The main portal was erected in Renaissance style.
