= Lyell Immunopharma =

American biopharmaceutical company

Lyell Immunopharma, Inc.
- Type: Public
- Traded as: Nasdaq: LYEL
- ISIN: US55083R2031
- Industry: Biotechnology; Pharmaceuticals
- Founded: 2018; 8 years ago
- Founders: Richard Klausner; Crystal Mackall; Stanley Riddell
- Headquarters: South San Francisco, California, U.S.
- Key people: Lynn Seely (CEO)
- Website: lyell.com

Lyell Immunopharma, Inc. is an American clinical-stage biopharmaceutical company headquartered in South San Francisco, California. Founded in 2018, the company develops next-generation cell therapies, including CAR T cell (chimeric antigen receptor therapies), using technologies intended to improve T cell persistence, function, and resistance to exhaustion. Its pipeline includes therapies being developed for hematologic malignancies and solid tumors.

== Company History ==
The company was founded by cell therapy researchers and physicians including former National Cancer Institute director Rick Klausner, Stanford University professor Crystal Mackall, and University of Washington and Fred Hutchinson Cancer Center professor Stan Riddell. Its initial research focused on overcoming limitations of adoptive cell therapy, including T cell exhaustion and inadequate persistence in solid tumors.

In June 2021, Lyell completed its initial public offering (IPO) on Nasdaq under the ticker symbol LYEL. The company emerged from stealth mode with substantial private funding to solve the core biological barriers limiting the efficacy of adoptive cell therapies against solid tumors, raising approximately $425 million before underwriting discounts and commissions in its IPO.

In October 2024, Lyell completed its acquisition of ImmPACT Bio. The transaction added ImmPACT Bio's dual-targeting CD19/CD20 CAR T cell program, subsequently identified as rondecabtagene autoleucel (ronde-cel), also known as LYL314.

== Technology ==
Lyell's research has focused on engineering T cells to improve their persistence and function. Its technology portfolio has included genetic and epigenetic approaches intended to address T cell exhaustion and generate cell products with enhanced memory characteristics. The company has described its Gen-R genetic reprogramming platform and Epi-R epigenetic reprogramming approach in its regulatory filings and corporate materials.

== Pipeline ==
As of the company's 2025 Form 10-K, Lyell's lead product candidate is rondecabtagene autoleucel (ronde-cel) (LYL314), an autologous dual-targeting CD19/CD20 CAR T cell therapy being developed for large B cell lymphoma. The therapy targets B cells expressing either CD19 or CD20 and is manufactured to enrich for CD62L-positive T cells, which are associated with naïve and central-memory T cell characteristics.

Lyell also holds exclusive global rights, outside mainland China, Hong Kong, Macau, and Taiwan, to LYL273, formerly known as GCC19CART. LYL273 is a guanylyl cyclase C (GCC)-targeted CAR T cell therapy being developed for relapsed or refractory metastatic colorectal cancer and other GCC-expressing cancers. In June 2026, Lyell amended its ongoing U.S. Phase 1 trial to enable expansion into a potential pivotal Phase 2 trial, subject to regulatory alignment.

Earlier Lyell programs included LYL797, a ROR1-targeted CAR T cell therapy, and LYL845, a tumor-infiltrating lymphocyte (TIL) therapy. Both programs were subsequently deprioritized or discontinued in October 2024 as the company shifted its focus toward its newer pipeline.

== Corporate Affairs ==
Lyell's principal executive offices are located at 201 Haskins Way, South San Francisco, California. The company also leases manufacturing, office and laboratory space in Bothell, Washington, and other facilities in California.
