= Ram Shriram =

American businessman

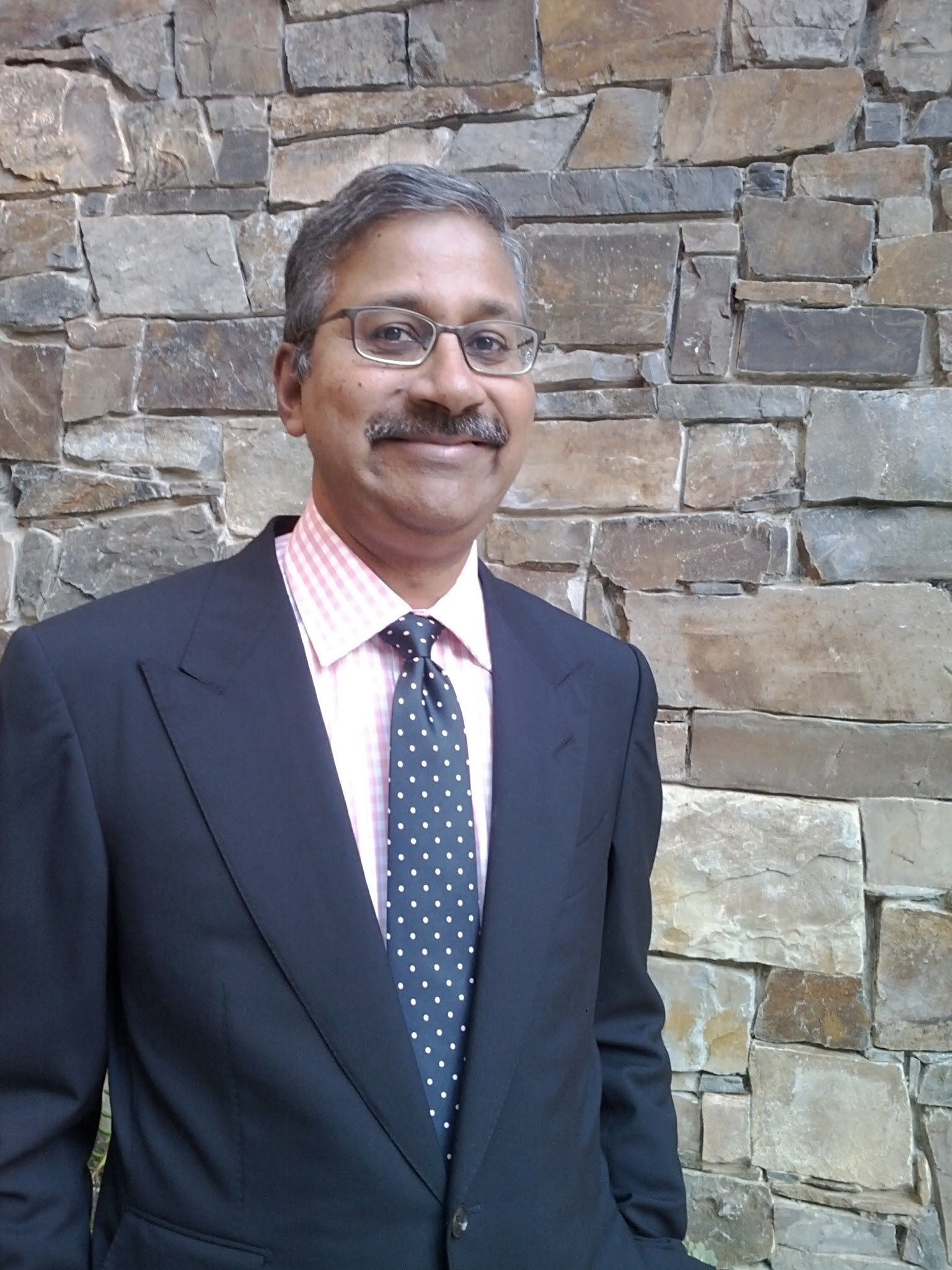
- Shriram (2021)
- Born: 1956 or 1957 (age 69–70); Madras, India
- Citizenship: American
- Education: University of Madras
- Occupation: Businessman
- Spouse: Vijay Shriram
- Children: 2

Kavitark Ram Shriram (born 1956/57) is an American billionaire businessman and philanthropist. He is a founding board member and one of the first investors in Google. He worked earlier in Amazon. Shriram came to Amazon.com in August 1998, when the company acquired Junglee, an online comparison shopping firm of which Shriram was president. Before Junglee and Amazon, Shriram was a member of the Netscape executive team, joining them in 1994, before they shipped products or posted revenue.

According to Forbes, as of September 2020, his net worth was $2.3 billion.

== Early life ==
Shriram holds a bachelor's degree in mathematics from Loyola College, Chennai, University of Madras.

== Career ==
Shriram started his career with Bell-Northern Research.

In 1994, he became a vice president of Netscape. Later, he also served as a president of Junglee.

Shriram started Sherpalo, a venture capital firm that invests in promising new disruptive technologies, in January 2000.

In 2020, Ram Shriram was selected for the Ellis Island medal of honor.

== Philanthropy ==
Shriram and his wife have donated funds through education-focused Dhanam Foundation. They have funded Shriram Family Professorship in Science Education and the Shriram Family Fellowship in Science Education at Stanford Graduate School of Education. They have also funded $57 million to establish Shriram Center for Bioengineering & Chemical Engineering at Stanford University.

In 2014, the Shriram along with his wife donated $61 million to the newly established Stanford Department of Bioengineering.

== Personal life ==
He is married to Vijay Shriram. They have two daughters, Jhanvi and Ketaki, graduates of Stanford University and founders of Palo Alto–based AI startup Krikey AI.
