= Hal V. Barron =

American biotechnologist (born 1962)

- Education: Washington University in St. Louis, Yale University, University of California, San Francisco
- Scientific career
- Fields: Physician
- Workplaces: University of California, San Francisco (UCSF), Calico (company), Genentech, Hoffmann-La Roche

Hal V. Barron (born 1962) is an American clinician-scientist and drug developer who served as president of research and development at GlaxoSmithKline from March 2018 until 2022, when he resigned in order to join the cellular reprogramming venture Altos Labs in August of that year. Prior to this he served as president of research and development at Calico. He has served as executive vice president, head of global product development, and chief medical officer of Hoffman-La Roche.

== Career ==
Barron joined Genentech in 1996 as a clinical scientist and was promoted in 2002 to Vice President of Medical Affairs. In 2002 Barron was promoted to vice president of medical affairs and in 2003 he became the senior vice president of development. In 2004 he was appointed chief medical officer and in 2009 he was appointed executive vice president.

On September 18, 2013, Barron was named President of Research and Development of Calico, a new company focusing on the biology of aging. The company was created and funded by Google.

On November 8, 2017, Barron became the new CSO and research chief at GlaxoSmithKline amid a shake-up from its new CEO Emma Walmsley. Barron was quoted: "GSK is a company with a rich history of innovation, with many talented scientists who care deeply about translating great science into therapies that make a meaningful difference for patients. I believe there is a significant opportunity to accelerate this effort and am looking forward to joining Emma and the team on this mission.”

In April 2019, it was publicly reported that Barron spent excessively on travel expenses during the previous year. The total expenses exceeded $807,000 (£620,000). Shareholders, investors, and rank-and-file employees have all expressed concern tilting towards outrage that he has been allow to spend so freely while others are constrained and employee layoffs continue.

In January 2022, it was announced that Barron will join Altos starting on 1 August 2022 at newly created biotech company Altos Labs, based in San Francisco.

Barron's current academic positions at the University of California, San Francisco include Associate Adjunct Professor of Epidemiology and Biostatistics, and Associate Clinical Professor of Medicine/Cardiology. He has been issued several patents for his work in thrombosis and angiogenesis, and has published more than 80 papers in peer-reviewed scientific journals. He was a member of the board of directors at Alexza Pharmaceuticals, and is a current member of the board of directors at Juno Therapeutics.

== Education ==
Barron received his medical degree from Yale School of Medicine and holds a Bachelor of Science degree in engineering physics from Washington University in St. Louis. He completed his training in medicine and cardiology at the University of California, San Francisco.
