= Insolvency law of Russia =

Insolvency law of Russia mainly includes Federal Law No. 127-FZ "On Insolvency (Bankruptcy)". Previously, Federal Law No. 40-FZ "On Insolvency (Bankruptcy) of Credit Institutions" was also in force, but it ceased to have effect as of 22 December 2014.

== Legislation ==
Federal Law No. 127-FZ "On Insolvency (Bankruptcy)" dated 26 October 2002 (as amended) (the "Bankruptcy Act"), replacing the previous law in 1998, to better address the above problems and a broader failure of the action. Russian insolvency law is intended for a wide range of borrowers: individuals and companies of all sizes, with the exception of state-owned enterprises, government agencies, political parties and religious organizations. There are also special rules for insurance companies, professional participants of the securities market, agricultural organizations and other special laws for financial institutions, credit institutions, and companies in the natural monopolies in the energy industry.

== Stages ==
Bankruptcy law applicable to legal entities provides for the following stages of insolvency proceedings:

- Monitoring procedure or Supervision (nablyudeniye);
- The economic recovery (finansovoe ozdorovleniye);
- External control (vneshneye upravleniye);
- Liquidation (konkursnoye proizvodstvo) and
- Comprehensive Agreement (mirovoye soglasheniye).

Bankruptcy law applicable to natural persons provides for the following stages of insolvency proceedings (the procedure has been available since 1 July 2015):

- Debt restructuring (restrukturizatsiya dolgov);
- Asset realisation (realizatsiya imushchestva); and
- Comprehensive Agreement (mirovoye soglasheniye).

== Role of insolvency officers and associated professionals ==
The main face of the bankruptcy process is the insolvency officer (trustee in bankruptcy). At various stages of bankruptcy, he has to be determined: the temporary officer, external control, the receiver or administrative officer. During the bankruptcy trustee in bankruptcy (insolvency officer) has a decisive influence on the movement of assets (property) of the debtor - the debtor and has a key influence on the economic and legal aspects of its operations.

Insolvency Officer (Trustee in bankruptcy) performs the some functions of the head of the debtor and has a right to decide how the company - the debtor will continue its work, in what order will curl or develop its activities, which assets (property) will be put up for sale and under what conditions, as well as a variety of legal issues last and present activities of the debtor.

Insolvency official state vary depending on the stage of the proceedings. It will:

- Interim Officer (vremenniy upravlyayuschiy) in the monitoring phase;
- Administrative Officer (administrativniy upravlyayuschiy) in the economic scenario of rehabilitation;
- External Manager (vneshniy upravlyayuschiy) in the management of external;
- Settlement Officer (konkursniy upravlyayuschiy) in liquidation; and
- Financial Manager (finansovyi upravlyayuschiy) in the insolvency of sitizens;

The powers of the liquidator, depending on the phase of the competition depends on the question. For example, the interim manager has no right to manage the affairs of the debtor during the monitoring step, but has the right to do so at a later stage. In the settlement process, current liabilities have priority and are satisfied before other claims are met.

== Prioritization of claimants ==
- First, the claims for damages to life or human health and moral damage;
- Second, the claim for breach obligations in respect of salaries and other payments to the relation to employment and royalties and
- Third, other requirements, with the exception of required by the above described procedure, it can still be to the satisfaction of all rights to satisfy the priority.

== Settlement agreement ==
The agreement between the debtor, creditors and the company under bankruptcy may be reached at any stage of the proceedings. The agreement on the settlement on behalf of the debtor must be entered:

- Executive Director of the debtor in the period of monitoring and financial recovery;
- External administrator in the phase of external control, and
- Elimination of a manager in the settlement process.

Settlement Agreement on behalf of the bankruptcy creditors and authorized bodies need a simple majority (50% + 1 vote) approved the bankruptcy creditors and authorized bodies for the meeting of creditors.
