= Private equity in the 2020s =

In the 2020s private equity (PE) firms responded to the COVID-19 recession with a surge in funding.

The World Economic Forum suggested private equity would fund the post-recession revival of the economy, with patient capital. However, by 2021, statistics show that private equity had increased its management of U.S. corporate equity from about four percent, in 2000, to about 20 percent, showing growth at almost five times the U.S. economy. The trend is also noted in the sharp decline of public companies, over the past three decades, as thousands transitioned to private with increased investor equity. Law professors, including Elisabeth de Fontenay of Duke University, and John Coates of Harvard Law, caution that the trend greatly diminishes corporate transparency and accountability.

== Law practices and legislation ==
Law firm tech investment costs role steeply with the advent of artificial intelligence (AI) use, prompting growth in firms accepting private equity investment, and in U.S. states proposing regulations. The States of California, Colorado and Illinois each proposed legislation to limit private equity investor influence on law firms in 2026. Colorado passed HB26-1421 on May 12, and Illinois voted for an amended version of its House Bill 5487. California Assembly Bill 2305 passed its House on April 6.

== Healthcare sector ==
By 2024, PE investments into Healthcare facilities boomed, with $100 billion invested in thousands of acquisitions annually.

== Hi-tech sector ==
Following Enron's exploitation of accounting rules of 25 years earlier; several high-value, American hi-tech companies, including Alphabet, Meta, and Microsoft, created similar financing vehicles, as variable interest entities (VIEs), to more favorably repackage debt-loads, as they compete to build data centers to deliver AI power to computing, for which Morgan Stanley predicts that the industry will have invested $3 trillion through 2028.
