= Arthur D. Levinson =

American businessman (born 1950)

- Born: March 31, 1950 (age 76); Seattle, Washington, U.S.
- Education: University of Washington (BS); Princeton University (PhD)
- Occupations: CEO of Calico; Lead independent director of Apple
- Known for: Lead independent director of Apple; Founder and CEO of Calico; Former CEO and chairman of Genentech
- Spouse: Rita May Liff
- Children: 2
- Scientific career
- Fields: Oncology, virology, immunology, biochemistry
- Workplaces: Princeton University; Calico
- Thesis: Identification and Characterization of Adenovirus Tumor Antigens (1977)
- Doctoral advisor: Arnold J. Levine

Arthur D. Levinson (born March 31, 1950) is an American businessman who is the lead independent director of Apple (2026–present) and chief executive officer (CEO) of Calico (an Alphabet Inc. venture). He is the former CEO (1995–2009) and chairman (1999–2014) of Genentech, and the former chairman (2011–2026) of Apple.

In addition to serving on the board of Apple (2000–present), Levinson is on the board of directors of the Broad Institute. Previously, Levinson had been on the board of directors at Hoffmann-La Roche (2010–2014), NGM Biopharmaceuticals (2009–2014), and Amyris Biotechnologies (2009–2014). He is on the Board of Scientific Consultants of the Memorial Sloan Kettering Cancer Center, the Industrial Advisory Board of the California Institute for Quantitative Biosciences (QB3), the advisory council for the Princeton University Department of Molecular Biology and the advisory council for the Lewis-Sigler Institute for Integrative Genomics.

== Early life and education ==
Levinson was born to a Jewish family. He is a son of Malvina and Sol Levinson.

Levinson received a Bachelor of Science with a major in molecular biology from the University of Washington in 1972 and a Doctor of Philosophy in biomedical sciences from Princeton University in 1977.

== Career ==
Levinson was a postdoctoral researcher with Nobel Prize winners J. Michael Bishop and Harold Varmus in the department of microbiology at the University of California, San Francisco, when Herb Boyer hired him to work at Genentech. Levinson joined Genentech in 1980 as a research scientist and became vice president of research technology in 1989; vice president of research in 1990; senior vice president of research in 1992; and senior vice president of research and development in 1993. Levinson became Genentech's chief executive officer in 1995 and chairman in 1999. Levinson received corporate leadership awards from the Irvington Institute and the National Breast Cancer Coalition in 1999.

Levinson was inducted into the Biotech Hall of Fame at the 2003 Biotech Meeting of CEOs. BusinessWeek named Levinson one of the "Best Managers of the Year" in 2004 and 2005, and Institutional Investor named him "America's Best CEO" in the biotech category four years in a row (2004–2007). Levinson served on the board of directors of Google from 2004 to 2009.

In 2006, Princeton University awarded Levinson the James Madison Medal for a distinguished career in scientific research and in biotechnology. Also in 2006, Barron's recognized Levinson as one of "The World's Most Respected CEOs", and Louis Carter, CEO and founder of Best Practice Institute placed Levinson on its "25 Top CEOs" list upon approval of his Senior Executive Board. In 2008 Levinson was elected as a Fellow to the American Academy of Arts and Sciences and Glassdoor rated him as the "nicest" CEO of 2008 with a 93% approval rating.

In 2010, Levinson was honored with the Biotechnology Heritage Award from the Biotechnology Industry Organization (BIO) and the Chemical Heritage Foundation, and the Director's Award from the San Francisco Exploratorium.

Levinson has authored or co-authored more than 80 scientific articles and has been a named inventor on 11 United States patents.

On November 15, 2011, Levinson was named non-executive chairman of the board for Apple, replacing Steve Jobs.

On September 18, 2013, Levinson was named CEO of Calico, a new company focusing on health and well-being. The company was created and funded by Google.

In 2014 he received the Alumnus Summa Laude Dignatus Award from the University of Washington, the highest honor bestowed upon a Washington graduate.

On October 3, 2014, Levinson received the National Medal of Technology and Innovation, the nation's highest honor for achievement and leadership in advancing the fields of science and technology.

In April 2016, Levinson was awarded the 2016 Distinguished Alumnus Award from the University of California, San Francisco for his contributions to the scientific community.

In 2020 he received the Bower Award for Business Leadership of the Franklin Institute.

As of May 2021, he owns approximately 4.5 million Apple shares worth US$786 million.

On April 20, 2026, it was announced that Levinson would become the lead independent director of Apple commencing September 1, 2026.

== Personal life ==
He married Rita May Liff on December 17, 1978, they have two children and reside in the Seattle area. His son, Jesse Levinson, is currently CTO of Zoox.

== See also ==
- Breakthrough Prize in Life Sciences

Business positions
Preceded by Steve Jobs	Apple Chairman; 2011–2026	Succeeded by Tim Cook
