= List of mergers and acquisitions by Alphabet =

Google's logo

Google is a computer software and a web search engine company that acquired, on average, more than one company per week in 2010 and 2011. The table below is an incomplete list of acquisitions, with each acquisition listed being for the respective company in its entirety, unless otherwise specified. The acquisition date listed is the date of the agreement between Google and the acquisition subject. As Google is headquartered in the United States, acquisition is listed in US dollars. If the price of an acquisition is unlisted, then it is undisclosed. If the Google service that is derived from the acquired company is known, then it is also listed here. Google itself was re-organized into a subsidiary of a larger holding company known as Alphabet Inc. in 2015.

Timeline of Google products, services, and acquisitions ending in 2015

As of March 2025, Alphabet has acquired over 200 companies, with its largest acquisition being the purchase of Wiz, a cloud security company, for $32 billion in 2025 (the acquisition received unconditional approval from the European Union in February 2026). Most of the firms acquired by Google are based in the United States, and, in turn, most of these are based in or around the San Francisco Bay Area. To date, Alphabet has divested itself of four business units: Frommers, which was sold back to Arthur Frommer in April 2012; SketchUp, which was sold to Trimble in April 2012, Boston Dynamics in early 2016 and Google Radio Automation, which was sold to WideOrbit in 2009.

Many Google products originated as services provided by companies that Google has since acquired. For example, Google's first acquisition was the Usenet company Deja News, and its services became Google Groups. Similarly, Google acquired Dodgeball, a social networking service company, and eventually replaced it with Google Latitude. Other acquisitions include web application company JotSpot, which became Google Sites; Voice over IP company GrandCentral, which became Google Voice; and video hosting service company Next New Networks, which became YouTube Next Lab and Audience Development Group. CEO Larry Page has explained that potential acquisition candidates must pass a sort of "toothbrush test": Are their products potentially useful once or twice a day, and do they improve your life?

Following the acquisition of Israel-based startup Waze in June 2013, Google submitted a 10-Q filing with the Securities Exchange Commission (SEC) that revealed that the corporation spent $1.3 billion on acquisitions during the first half of 2013, with $966 million of that total going to Waze.

== Key Acquisitions ==
In October 2006, Google announced that it had acquired the video-sharing site YouTube for $1.65 billion in Google stock, and the deal was finalized on November 13, 2006.

On April 13, 2007, Google reached an agreement to acquire DoubleClick for $3.1 billion, transferring to Google valuable relationships that DoubleClick had with Web publishers and advertising agencies. The deal was approved despite anti-trust concerns raised by competitors Microsoft and AT&T.

On August 15, 2011, Google made what was, at its time, its largest-ever acquisition to date when it announced that it would acquire Motorola Mobility for $12.5 billion subject to approval from regulators in the United States and Europe. This purchase was made in part to help Google gain Motorola's considerable patent portfolio on mobile phones and wireless technologies, to help protect Google in its ongoing patent disputes with other companies, mainly Apple and Microsoft, and to allow it to continue to freely offer Android. The merger was completed on May 22, 2012, after the approval of China.

In June 2013, Google acquired Waze, a $966 million deal. While Waze would remain an independent entity, its social features, such as its crowdsourced location platform, were reportedly valuable integrations between Waze and Google Maps, Google's own mapping service.

On January 26, 2014, Google announced it had agreed to acquire DeepMind Technologies, a privately held artificial intelligence company from London. DeepMind describes itself as having the ability to combine the best techniques from machine learning and systems neuroscience to build general-purpose learning algorithms. DeepMind's first commercial applications were used in simulations, e-commerce and games. As of December 2013, it was reported that DeepMind had roughly 75 employees. Technology news website Recode reported that the company was purchased for $400 million though it was not disclosed where the information came from. A Google spokesman would not comment on the price. The purchase of DeepMind aids in Google's recent growth in the artificial intelligence and robotics community.

== List of mergers and acquisitions ==
Number	Acquisition date	Company	Business	Country	Price (USD)	Price adjusted for inflation (USD)	Used as or integrated with	Ref.
1	February 12, 2001	DejaNews	Usenet	United States	—	—	Google Groups	
2	September 20, 2001	Outride	Web search engine	United States	—	—	Google Personalized Search	
3	February 2003	Pyra Labs	Weblog software	United States	—	—	Blogger	
4	April 2003	Neotonic Software	Customer relationship management	United States	—	—	Google Groups, Gmail	
5	April 2003	Applied Semantics	Online advertising	United States	$102,000,000	$179,000,000	AdSense, AdWords	
6	September 30, 2003	Kaltix	Web search engine	United States	—	—	Google Personalized Search	
7	October 2003	Sprinks	Online advertising	United States	—	—	AdSense, AdWords	
8	October 2003	Genius Labs	Blogging	United States	—	—	Blogger	
9	May 10, 2004	Ignite Logic	HTML editor	United States	—	—	Google Sites	
10	July 13, 2004	Picasa	Image organizer	United States	—	—	Picasa, Blogger	
11	September 2004	ZipDash	Traffic analysis	United States	—	—	Google Maps	
12	October 2004	Where2	Map analysis	Australia	—	—	Google Maps	
13	October 27, 2004	Keyhole	Map analysis	United States	—	—	Google Maps, Google Earth	
14	March 28, 2005	Urchin Software Corporation	Web analytics	United States	—	—	Google Analytics	
15	May 12, 2005	Dodgeball	Social networking service	United States	—	—	Google Latitude	
16	July 19, 2005	Akwan Information Technologies	Search engines	Brazil	—	—	Internet backbone	
17	July 2005	Reqwireless	Mobile browser	Canada	—	—	Google Mobile	
18	August 17, 2005	Android	Mobile operating system	United States	$50,000,000	$82,000,000	Android	
19	November 2005	Skia	Graphics library	United States	—	—	Skia	
20	December 27, 2005	Phatbits	Widget engine	United States	—	—	Google Desktop	
21	December 31, 2005	allPAY	Mobile software	Germany	—	—	Google Mobile	
22	December 31, 2005	bruNET	Mobile software	Germany	—	—	Google Mobile	
23	January 17, 2006	dMarc Broadcasting	Advertising	United States	$102,000,000	$163,000,000	AdSense	
24	February 14, 2006	Measure Map	Weblog software	United States	—	—	Google Analytics	
25	March 9, 2006	Upstartle	Word processor	United States	—	—	Google Docs	
26	March 14, 2006	@Last Software	3D modeling software	United States	—	—	Google Sketchup	
27	April 9, 2006	Orion	Web search engine	Australia	—	—	Google Search	
28	June 1, 2006	2Web Technologies	Online spreadsheets	United States	—	—	Google Spreadsheet	
29	August 15, 2006	Neven Vision Germany	Computer vision	Germany	—	—	Picasa, Google Goggles	
30	October 9, 2006	YouTube	Video sharing	United States	$1,650,000,000	$2.635×10^{9}	YouTube	
31	October 31, 2006	JotSpot	Web application	United States	—	—	Google Sites	
32	December 18, 2006	Endoxon	Mapping	Switzerland	$28,000,000	$45,000,000	Google Maps	
33	February 16, 2007	Adscape	In-game advertising	United States	$23,000,000	$36,000,000	AdSense	
34	March 16, 2007	Trendalyzer	Statistical software	Sweden	—	—	Google Analytics	
35	May 28, 2007	Crusix	Social networking service	United States	—	—	YouTube	—
36	April 17, 2007	Tonic Systems	Presentation program	United States	—	—	Google Docs	
37	April 19, 2007	Marratech	Videoconferencing	Sweden	$15,000,000	$23,000,000	Google Talk, Google Hangouts	
38	April 13, 2007	DoubleClick	Online advertising	United States	$3,100,000,000	$4.813×10^{9}	AdSense	
39	May 11, 2007	GreenBorder	Computer security	United States	—	—	Google Chrome	
40	June 1, 2007	Panoramio	Photo sharing	Spain	—	—	Panoramio	
41	June 3, 2007	FeedBurner	Web feed	United States	$100,000,000	$155,000,000	FeedBurner	
42	June 5, 2007	PeakStream	Parallel processing	United States	—	—	Android	
43	June 19, 2007	Zenter	Presentation program	United States	—	—	Google Docs	
44	July 2, 2007	GrandCentral	Voice over IP	United States	$45,000,000	$70,000,000	Google Voice	
45	July 20, 2007	ImageAmerica	Aerial photography	United States	—	—	Google Maps	
46	July 9, 2007	Postini	Communications security	United States	$625,000,000	$970,000,000	Gmail	
47	September 27, 2007	Zingku	Social networking service	United States	—	—	Google Mobile	
48	October 9, 2007	Jaiku	Microblogging	Finland	—	—	Google Mobile	
49	July 30, 2008	Omnisio	Online video	United States	$15,000,000	$22,000,000	YouTube	
50	September 12, 2008	TNC	Weblog software	South Korea	—	—	Blogger	
51	August 5, 2009	On2	Video compression	United States	$133,000,000	$200,000,000	WebM, YouTube	
52	September 16, 2009	reCAPTCHA	Security	United States	—	—	Google Books, reCAPTCHA	
53	November 9, 2009	AdMob	Mobile advertising	United States	—	—	DoubleClick, Invite Media	
54	November 9, 2009	Gizmo5	Voice over IP	United States	$30,000,000	$45,000,000	Google Talk, Google Hangouts	
55	November 23, 2009	Teracent	Online advertising	United States	—	—	AdSense	
56	December 4, 2009	AppJet	Collaborative real-time editor	United States	—	—	Google Wave, Google Docs	
57	February 12, 2010	Aardvark	Social search	United States	$50,000,000	$74,000,000	Aardvark	
58	February 17, 2010	reMail	Email search	United States	—	—	Gmail	
59	March 1, 2010	Picnik	Photo editing	United States	—	—	Picasa	
60	March 5, 2010	DocVerse	Microsoft Office files sharing site	United States	$25,000,000	$37,000,000	Google Docs	
61	April 2, 2010	Episodic	Online video platform start-up	United States	—	—	YouTube	
62	April 12, 2010	Plink	Visual search engine	Ireland	—	—	Google Goggles	
63	April 20, 2010	Agnilux	Server CPUs	United States	—	—	Android	
64	April 27, 2010	LabPixies	Gadgets	Israel	—	—	iGoogle, Android	
65	April 30, 2010	BumpTop	Desktop environment	Canada	$30,000,000	$44,000,000	Android	
66	May 18, 2010	Global IP Solutions	Video and audio compression	United States	$68,200,000	$101,000,000	WebRTC	
67	May 20, 2010	Simplify Media	Music streaming	United States	—	—	Android	
68	May 21, 2010	Ruba.com	Travel	United States	—	—	iGoogle	
69	June 3, 2010	Invite Media	Advertising	United States	$81,000,000	$120,000,000	DoubleClick	
70	July 16, 2010	Metaweb	Semantic search	United States	—	—	Google Search	
71	August 2010	Zetawire	Mobile payment, NFC	Canada	—	—	Android, Google Wallet, Google Checkout	
72	August 4, 2010	Instantiations	Java/Eclipse/AJAX developer tools	United States	—	—	Google Web Toolkit	
73	August 5, 2010	Slide.com	Social gaming	United States	$228,000,000	$337,000,000	Google+, Orkut, Google Play	
74	August 10, 2010	Jambool	Social Gold payment	United States	$70,000,000	$103,000,000	Google+, Orkut	
75	August 15, 2010	Like.com	Visual search engine	United States	$100,000,000	$148,000,000	Google Shopping	
76	August 30, 2010	Angstro	Social networking service	United States	—	—	Google, Google Alert	
77	August 30, 2010	SocialDeck	Social gaming	Canada	—	—	Google, Google+	
78	September 13, 2010	Quiksee	Online video	Israel	$10,000,000	$15,000,000	Google Maps	
79	September 28, 2010	Plannr	Schedule management	United States	—	—	Google+	
80	October 1, 2010	BlindType	Touch typing	Greece	—	—	Android	
81	December 3, 2010	Phonetic Arts	Speech synthesis	United Kingdom	—	—	Google Voice, Google Translate	
82	December 3, 2010	Widevine Technologies	DRM	United States	—	—	Google TV	
83	January 13, 2011	eBook Technologies	E-book	United States	—	—	Google Books	
84	January 25, 2011	SayNow	Voice recognition	United States	—	—	Google Voice	
85	March 1, 2011	Zynamics	Security	Germany	—	—	Project Zero	
86	March 7, 2011	BeatThatQuote.com	Price comparison service	United Kingdom	$65,000,000	$93,000,000	Google Shopping	
87	March 7, 2011	Next New Networks	Online video	United States	—	—	YouTube	
88	March 16, 2011	Green Parrot Pictures	Digital video	Ireland	—	—	YouTube	
89	April 8, 2011	PushLife	Service provider	Canada	$25,000,000	$36,000,000	Google Play	
90	April 12, 2011	ITA Software	Travel technology	United States	$676,000,000	$968,000,000	Google Flights	
91	April 26, 2011	TalkBin	Mobile software	United States	—	—	Android	
92	May 23, 2011	Sparkbuy	Product search	United States	—	—	Google Shopping	
93	June 3, 2011	PostRank	Social media analytics service	Canada	—	—	Google+ Google Analytics	
94	June 9, 2011	Admeld	Online advertising	United States	$400,000,000	$572,000,000	DoubleClick, Invite Media	
95	June 18, 2011	SageTV	Media center	United States	—	—	Google TV, Google Fiber, Android TV	
96	July 8, 2011	Punchd	Loyalty program	United States	—	—	Google Offers	
97	July 21, 2011	Fridge	Social groups	United States	—	—	Google+	
98	July 23, 2011	PittPatt	Facial recognition system	United States	—	—	Android	
99	August 1, 2011	Dealmap	One deal a day service	United States	—	—	Google Offers	
100	August 15, 2011	Motorola Mobility	Mobile device manufacturer	United States	$12,500,000,000	$1.7890×10^{10}	Android, Google TV, Android TV, Patent portfolio	
101	September 7, 2011	Zave Networks	Digital coupons	United States	—	—	Google Offers	
102	September 8, 2011	Zagat	Restaurant reviews	United States	$151,000,000	$216,000,000	Google Places, Google Maps	
103	September 19, 2011	DailyDeal	One deal a day service	Germany	$114,000,000	$163,000,000	Google Offers	
104	October 11, 2011	SocialGrapple	Social media analytics service	Canada	—	—	Google+ Google Analytics	
105	November 10, 2011	Apture	Instantaneous search	United States	—	—	Google Search	
106	November 14, 2011	Katango	Social circle organization	United States	—	—	Google+	
107	December 9, 2011	RightsFlow	Music rights management	United States	—	—	YouTube	
108	December 13, 2011	Clever Sense	Local recommendations app	United States	—	—	Google Maps	
109	March 16, 2012	Milk	Software company	United States	—	—	Google+	
110	April 2, 2012	TxVia	Online payments	United States	—	—	Google Wallet, Google Checkout	
111	June 4, 2012	Meebo	Social networking	United States	$100,000,000	$140,000,000	Google+	
112	June 5, 2012	Quickoffice	Mobile office suite	United States	—	—	Google Docs	
113	July 20, 2012	Sparrow	Mobile apps	France	$25,000,000	$35,000,000	Gmail	
114	2012	WIMM Labs	Android-powered smartwatches	United States	—	—	Android Wear	
115	August 1, 2012	Wildfire Interactive	Social media marketing	United States	$450,000,000	$631,000,000	Google, Google+	
116	September 7, 2012	VirusTotal.com	Security	Spain	—	—	Chronicle	
117	September 17, 2012	Nik Software	Photography	United States	—	—	Google, Android	
118	October 1, 2012	Viewdle	Facial recognition	Ukraine	$45,000,000	$63,000,000	Android	
119	November 28, 2012	Incentive Targeting	Digital coupons	United States	—	—	Google Offers	
120	November 30, 2012	BufferBox	Package delivery	Canada	$17,000,000	$24,000,000	Google Shopping, Android	
121	February 6, 2013	Channel Intelligence	Product ecommerce	United States	$125,000,000	$173,000,000	Google Shopping	
122	March 12, 2013	DNNresearch	Deep Neural Networks	Canada	$44,000,000	$61,000,000	Google, X	
123	March 15, 2013	Talaria Technologies	Cloud computing	United States	—	—	Google Cloud	
124	April 12, 2013	Behavio	Social prediction	United States	—	—	Google Now	
125	April 23, 2013	Wavii	Natural language processing	United States	$30,000,000	$41,000,000	Google Knowledge Graph	
126	May 23, 2013	Makani Power	Airborne wind turbines	United States	—	—	X	
127	June 11, 2013	Waze	GPS navigation software	Israel	$966,000,000	$1.335×10^{9}	Google Maps, Waze	
128	September 16, 2013	Bump	Mobile software	United States	—	—	Google Photos	
129	October 2, 2013	Flutter	Gesture recognition technology	United States	$40,000,000	$55,000,000	Google, Android, X	
130	October 22, 2013	FlexyCore	DroidBooster app for Android	France	$23,000,000	$32,000,000	Android	
131	December 2, 2013	Schaft	Robotics, humanoid robots	Japan	—	—	X	
132	December 3, 2013	Industrial Perception	Robotic arms, computer vision	United States	—	—	X	
133	December 4, 2013	Redwood Robotics	Robotic arms	United States	—	—	X	
134	December 5, 2013	Meka Robotics	Robots	United States	—	—	X	
135	December 6, 2013	Holomni	Robotic wheels	United States	—	—	X	
136	December 7, 2013	Bot & Dolly	Robotic cameras	United States	—	—	X	
137	December 8, 2013	Autofuss	Ads and design	United States	—	—	X	
138	December 10, 2013	Boston Dynamics	Robotics	United States	—	—	X	
138	January 4, 2014	Bitspin	Timely app for Android	Switzerland	—	—	Android	
139	January 13, 2014	Nest Labs	Home automation	United States	$3,200,000,000	$4.352×10^{9}	Nest Labs	
140	January 15, 2014	Impermium	Internet security	United States	—	—	Project Zero	
141	January 26, 2014	DeepMind Technologies	Artificial intelligence	United Kingdom	$625,000,000	$850,000,000	Google DeepMind	
142	February 16, 2014	SlickLogin	Internet Security	Israel	—	—	Project Zero	
143	February 21, 2014	spider.io	Anti-click fraud	United Kingdom	—	—	DoubleClick, AdSense	
144	March 12, 2014	GreenThrottle	Gadgets	United States	—	—	Android	
145	April 14, 2014	Titan Aerospace	High-altitude UAVs	United States	—	—	Project Loon	
146	May 2, 2014	Rangespan	E-commerce	United Kingdom	—	—	Google Shopping	
147	May 6, 2014	Adometry	Online advertising attribution	United States	—	—	Google Analytics AdSense	
148	May 7, 2014	Appetas	Restaurant website creation	United States	—	—	Google My Business	
149	May 7, 2014	Stackdriver	Cloud computing	United States	—	—	Google Cloud Platform	
150	May 7, 2014	MyEnergy	Online energy usage monitoring	United States	—	—	Nest Labs	
151	May 16, 2014	Quest Visual	Augmented reality	United States	—	—	Google Translate	
152	May 19, 2014	Divide	Mobile device management	United States	—	—	Android for Work	
153	June 10, 2014	Skybox Imaging	Satellite	United States	$500,000,000	$680,000,000	Google Maps, Project Loon	
154	June 19, 2014	mDialog	Online advertising	Canada	—	—	DoubleClick	
155	June 19, 2014	Alpental Technologies	Wireless	United States	—	—	Google	
156	June 20, 2014	Dropcam	Home monitoring	United States	$555,000,000	$755,000,000	Nest Labs	
157	June 25, 2014	Appurify	Automated application testing	United States	$95,000,000	$129,000,000	Android	
158	July 1, 2014	Songza	Music streaming	United States	—	—	Google Play, Android TV	
159	July 23, 2014	drawElements	Graphics compatibility testing	Finland	—	—	Android	
160	August 6, 2014	Emu	IM client	United States	—	—	Google Hangouts, Google Now	
161	August 6, 2014	Directr	Mobile video	United States	—	—	YouTube	
162	August 17, 2014	Jetpac	Artificial intelligence, image recognition	United States	—	—	Picasa	
163	August 23, 2014	Gecko Design	Mechanical design	United States	—	—	X	
164	August 26, 2014	Zync Render	Cloud-based visual effects software	United States	—	—	Google Cloud Platform	
165	September 10, 2014	Lift Labs	Liftware	United States	—	—	Verily	
166	September 11, 2014	Polar	Social polling	United States	—	—	Google+	
167	October 21, 2014	Firebase	Application development platform	United States	—	—	Google Cloud Platform	
168	October 23, 2014	Dark Blue Labs & Vision Factory	Artificial intelligence	United Kingdom	$10,000,000	$14,000,000	Google DeepMind	
169	October 24, 2014	Revolv	Home automation	United States	—	—	Nest Labs	
170	November 19, 2014	RelativeWave	Mobile software prototyping	United States	—	—	Android	
171	December 17, 2014	Vidmaker	Video editing	United States	—	—	YouTube	
172	February 4, 2015	Launchpad Toys	Child-friendly apps	United States	—	—	YouTube for Kids	
173	February 8, 2015	Odysee	Multimedia sharing and storage	United States	—	—	Google+	
174	February 23, 2015	Softcard	Mobile payments	United States	—	—	Android Pay	
175	February 24, 2015	Red Hot Labs	App advertising and discovery	United States	—	—	Google Play	
176	April 16, 2015	Thrive Audio	Surround sound technology	Ireland	—	—	Google Cardboard	
177	April 16, 2015	Skillman & Hackett	Virtual reality software	United States	—	—	Tilt Brush	
178	May 4, 2015	Timeful	Mobile software	United States	—	—	Google Inbox, Google Calendar	
179	May 28, 2015	Pulse.io	Mobile app optimizer	United States	—	—	Android	
180	June 18, 2015	Agawi	Mobile application streaming	United States	—	—	Android, Google Play	
181	July 21, 2015	Pixate	Mobile software prototyping	United States	—	—	Android	
182	September 21, 2015	Oyster	E-book subscriptions	United States	—	—	Google Play Books	
183	September 30, 2015	Jibe Mobile	Rich Communication Services	United States	—	—	Google Messages	
185	October 17, 2015	Digisfera	360-degree photography	Portugal	—	—	Street View	
186	November 11, 2015	Fly Labs	Video editing	United States	—	—	Google Photos	
187	November 11, 2015	bebop	Cloud software	United States	$380,000,000	$516,000,000	Google Cloud Platform	
188	February 12, 2016	BandPage	Platform for musicians	United States	—	—	YouTube	
189	February 18, 2016	Pie	Enterprise communications	Singapore	—	—	Spaces	
190	May 2, 2016	Synergyse	Interactive learning platform	Canada	—	—	Google Docs	
191	June 22, 2016	Webpass	Internet service provider	United States	—	—	Google Fiber	
192	July 6, 2016	Moodstocks	Image recognition	France	—	—	Google Photos	
193	July 8, 2016	Anvato	Cloud-based video services	United States	—	—	Google Cloud Platform	
194	July 12, 2016	Kifi	Link management	United States	—	—	Spaces	
195	July 27, 2016	LaunchKit	Mobile developer tools	United States	—	—	Firebase	
196	August 8, 2016	Orbitera	Cloud software	United States	$100,000,000	$134,000,000	Google Cloud Platform	
197	September 8, 2016	Apigee	API management and predictive analytics	United States	$625,000,000	$838,000,000	Google Cloud Platform	
198	September 15, 2016	Urban Engines	Location-based analytics	United States	—	—	Google Maps	
199	September 19, 2016	API.AI	Natural language processing	United States	—	—	Google Assistant	
200	October 11, 2016	FameBit	Branded content	United States	—	—	YouTube	
201	October 24, 2016	Eyefluence	Eye tracking, virtual reality	United States	—	—		
202	November 5, 2016	LeapDroid	Android emulator	United States	—	—	Android	
203	November 21, 2016	Qwiklabs	Cloud-based hands-on training platform	United States	—	—	Google Cloud Platform	
204	December 13, 2016	Cronologics	Smartwatches	United States	—	—	Android Wear	
205	January 5, 2017	Limes Audio	Voice communication	Sweden	—	—	Google Duo, Google Hangouts	
206	January 19, 2017	Fabric	Mobile app platform	United States	—	—	Firebase	
207	March 8, 2017	Kaggle	Data science	United States	—	—	Google Cloud Platform	
208	March 9, 2017	AppBridge	Productivity suite	United States	—	—	Google Docs	
209	May 10, 2017	Owlchemy Labs	Virtual reality studio	United States	—	—		
210	July 12, 2017	Halli Labs	Artificial intelligence	India	—	—		
211	August 16, 2017	AIMatter	Computer vision	Belarus	—	—	YouTube	
212	September 21, 2017	HTC (portions)	Talent and intellectual property licenses	Taiwan	$1,100,000,000	$1.445×10^{9}	Google Pixel	
213	September 26, 2017	Bitium	Single sign-on and identity management	United States	—	—	Google Cloud Platform	
214	October 9, 2017	Relay Media	AMP converter	United States	—	—	Accelerated Mobile Pages	
215	October 11, 2017	60db	Podcasts	United States	—	—	Google Play Music, Google Podcasts	
216	January 11, 2018	Redux	Audio	United Kingdom	—	—		
217	March 27, 2018	Tenor	GIF image search	United States	—	—	Google Images, Gboard	
218	May 9, 2018	Velostrata	Cloud migration	Israel	—	—	Google Cloud Platform	
219	May 14, 2018	Cask	Big data, Hadoop	United States	—	—	Google Cloud Platform	
220	August 6, 2018	GraphicsFuzz	GPU reliability	United Kingdom	—	—	Android	
221	September 19, 2018	Senosis	Health monitoring	United States	—	—	Nest Labs	
222	October 2, 2018	Onward	Machine learning, natural language processing	United States	—	—		
223	November 28, 2018	Workbench Education	Education technology	United States	—	—	Google Classroom	
224	December 10, 2018	Sigmoid Labs	Indian Railways train tracking app Where Is My Train	India	$40,000,000	$51,000,000	Google Maps	
225	December 20, 2018	DevOps Research and Assessment	Research and assessment	United States	—	—	Google Cloud Platform	
226	January 3, 2019	Superpod	Question and answer app	United States	$60,000,000	$76,000,000	Google Assistant	
227	February 19, 2019	Alooma	Big data, cloud migration	Israel	$150,000,000	$189,000,000	Google Cloud Platform	
228	March 31, 2019	Nightcorn	Video sharing	Germany	—	—	YouTube	
229	June 6, 2019	Looker	Big data, analytics	United States	$2,600,000,000	$3.274×10^{9}	Google Cloud Platform	
230	July 9, 2019	Elastifile	File storage	United States	—	—	Google Cloud Platform	
231	October 16, 2019	Socratic	Learning apps	United States	—	—	Google Cloud Platform	
232	November 18, 2019	CloudSimple	Cloud hosting	United States	—	—	Google Cloud Platform	
233	December 19, 2019	Typhoon Studios	Video game development	Canada	—	—	Stadia	
234	January 14, 2020	AppSheet	Mobile app development	United States	—	—	Google Cloud Platform	
235	January 14, 2020	Pointy	Local retail inventory feeds	Ireland	$163,000,000	$203,000,000	Google Maps	
236	February 19, 2020	Cornerstone Technology B.V.	Mainframe, cloud migration	Netherlands	—	—	Google Cloud Platform	
237	June 30, 2020	North	Smart glasses	Canada	$180,000,000	$224,000,000		
238	August 25, 2020	Stratozone	Cloud assessment	United States	—	—	Google Cloud Platform	
239	December 8, 2020	Dataform	Big data, analytics	United Kingdom	—	—	Google Cloud Platform	
240	December 11, 2020	Neverware	ChromiumOS distribution	United States	—	—	ChromeOS Flex	
241	December 14, 2020	Actifio	Backup, disaster recovery	United States	—	—	Google Cloud Platform	
242	January 14, 2021	Fitbit	Wearables	United States	$2,100,000,000	$2.495×10^{9}	Wear OS	
243	February 2021	Provino	Cloud hardware	United States	—	—	Tensor processing unit	
244	April 5, 2021	Dysonics	Audio hardware	United States	—	—	Pixel Buds	
244	July 21, 2021	Simsim	E-commerce	India	$100,000,000	$119,000,000	YouTube	
245	September 3, 2021	Playspace	Collaboration tool	United States	—	—	Google Workspace	
246	October 18, 2021	MuJoCo	Robotics simulator	United States	—	—	Google DeepMind	
247	January 4, 2022	Siemplify	Cybersecurity	Israel	$500,000,000	$550,000,000	Google Cloud Platform	
248	March 8, 2022	Mandiant	Cybersecurity	United States	$5,400,000,000	$5.941×10^{9}	Google Cloud Platform	
249	March 16, 2022	Raxium	AR hardware	United States	$1,000,000,000	$1.100×10^{9}		
250	April 22, 2022	Vicarious	Artificial intelligence, robotics software	United States	—	—	Intrinsic	
251	April 29, 2022	MobiledgeX	Mobile edge computing	Germany	—	—	Google Cloud Platform	
252	May 13, 2022	Foreseeti	Cybersecurity software	Sweden	—	—	Google Cloud Platform	
253	August 2022	Alter	Artificial intelligence	United States; Czech Republic	$100,000,000	$110,000,000		
254	September 20, 2022	BreezoMeter	Air quality monitoring	Israel	—	—	Google Maps	
255	October 11, 2022	BrightBytes	Data and analytics	United States	—	—	Google for Education	
256	October 26, 2022	Sound Life Sciences	Health monitoring	United States	—	—		
257	December 15, 2022	Open Source Robotics Corporation	Robotics software	United States	—	—	Intrinsic	
258	June 2, 2023	Photomath	Artificial intelligence	Croatia	—	—	Bard	
259	June 5, 2024	Cameyo	Virtual app delivery	United States	—	—	ChromeOS	
260	September 16, 2024	Evaluable AI	LLM test and comparison tool	United States	—	—		
261	November 12, 2024	MutableAI	Coding documentation tool	United States	—	—		
262	November 21, 2024	Galileo AI	Text and image to user interface tool	United States	—	—		
263	November 26, 2024	Specs	Automated code testing	United States	—	—		
264	January 2025	HTC's Vive XR Team	Virtual and augmented reality	Taiwan	$250,000,000	$250,000,000	Android XR	
265	March 2025	Wiz	Cybersecurity	Israel	$32,000,000,000	$3.2000×10^{10}	Google Cloud Platform	
266	March 2025	AdHawk Microsystems	Camera-free eye-tracking technology, Smart glasses	Canada	—	—		
267	May 2025	Galileo AI	Artificial Intelligence	United States	—	—	Google Gemini	
268	October 2025	Atlantic Quantum	Superconducting Qubit Hardware	United States	—	—	Google Quantum	
269	December 22, 2025	Intersect	Data center, energy infrastructure	United States	$4,750,000,000	$4.750×10^{9}		
270	June 23, 2026	Prestige LLC	Multimedia Company					

== Divestitures ==
On December 10, 2012, Google sold the manufacturing operations of Motorola Mobility to Flextronics for $75 million. As a part of the agreement, Flextronics will manufacture undisclosed Android and other mobile devices. On December 19, 2012, Google sold the Motorola Home business division of Motorola Mobility to Arris Group for $2.35 billion in a cash-and-stock transaction. As a part of this deal, Google acquired a 15.7% stake in Arris Group valued at $300 million.

On January 29, 2014, Google announced that it would divest Motorola Mobility to Lenovo for $2.91 billion, a fraction of the original $12.5 billion price paid by Google to acquire the company. Google retained all but 2000 of Motorola's patents and entered into cross-licensing deals.

In 2017, Google sold off its satellite business, Terra Bella, to Planet Labs for an undisclosed price and entered into a multi-year agreement to license Earth imagery from the company.

== See also ==
- CapitalG, Alphabet's growth capital investment fund
- GV, Alphabet's venture capital firm
- List of largest mergers and acquisitions
- Lists of corporate acquisitions and mergers
