= ImageAmerica =

Aerial photography company

ImageAmerica Aviation, Inc. is an aerial photography company that was acquired by Google in July 2007. The company specialized in creating aerial photos with "accuracy, quick delivery and low cost". It previously sold its services primarily to city, county, state, and federal governments and to corporate customers. ImageAmerica also made money by selling low-cost imagery to county appraisers and assessors. The company's clients include the Texas Department of Transportation, the U.S. Geological Survey, and the Lucas County office that covers Toledo, Ohio. For satellite imaging, the company charges US$99 per 1 square mile (2.6 km^{2}), compared to other companies which could charge from $500 to $700 and for a lower quality than what ImageAmerica offers. It also developed its own DDP-2 (Direct Digital Panoramic) camera system. The system is housed in an aircraft. It has the ability to capture details as small as 6 inches (150 mm) to 12 inches (300 mm). ImageAmerica's patented processing system has the ability to produce orthorectified imagery corrected for perspective distortions. The company's technology also uses sensors which are based on a unique design from Sarnoff Research Labs in Princeton, New Jersey.

The company was founded in 1998 (28 years ago) and is based in the Spirit of St. Louis Airport, Clayton, Missouri, United States. ImageAmerica builds high resolution cameras for aerial photographs. The company provided high resolution black and white images of New Orleans following the events of Hurricane Katrina. The company's products provide images for Google Maps and Google Earth.

When the company was acquired by Google, the acquisition price was not disclosed. After the acquisition, the project manager of Google Maps and Earth said in a statement that Google was excited "about how ImageAmerica's technology will contribute to [Google's] mapping services down the road." He went on to say, "Since we're in the research and development phase right now it may be some time before you see any of this imagery in Google Maps or Earth." In the same month, Google was on an acquisition-spree and had already acquired six other companies: Panoramio, PeakStream, Zenter, Feedburner, GrandCentral, and Postini.
