= OfficeArrow =

American social media platform

- Website type: Electronic Commerce, Social Media
- Available in: English
- Owners: OfficeArrow, LLC
- Website: officearrow.com
- Commercial: Yes
- Current status: Online

OfficeArrow is a business-to-business social media platform that is localized to the United States, providing a deal-of-the-day product, discount purchasing club, professionally sourced educational content, community discussion forums, and social functionality targeted towards entrepreneurs, small business executives, and other professionals.

== Deal-of-the-day ==
The OfficeArrow deal-of-the-day product offers only business products such as software and office supplies at a discount of between 50% and 90%. They offer one coupon per day. Advertisers are charged 50% of the total sale price.

While this model is almost identical to that of Groupon, OfficeArrow differs in that it does not restrict deals with minimum participation. In this regard, it is similar to American Internet retailer Woot. Some national brands and Internet retailers find this sales promotion tool useful for generating qualified sales leads.

== Community ==
Unlike Woot, Groupon, and other daily deal products, OfficeArrow's business is not built on the daily coupon. OfficeArrow.com connects paying and free members socially and professionally, offering a variety of social media capabilities, such as profiles, discussions, private messaging, and a virtual book club. OfficeArrow maintains databases of both expert- and community generated content, such as webinars, instructional articles, and document templates. Their professional discount club offers users regular discounts on goods and services from companies like American Express, Constant Contact, and Dymo.
