= Meh =

Expression of indifference or boredom

Meh (/mɛ/) is a colloquial interjection used as an expression of indifference or boredom. It is often regarded as a verbal equivalent of a shrug of the shoulders. The use of the term "meh" shows that the speaker is apathetic, uninterested, or indifferent to the question or subject at hand. It is occasionally used as an adjective, meaning something is mediocre or unremarkable.

Also considered a non-committal response, "meh" can be used when disregarding a question or to refer to something one has no opinion or emotions about. In expressing an opinion, it means the speaker's opinion is that of apathy. Some may respond with "meh" simply to avoid creating an opinion on the matter at all.

== Origin ==
The word may come from the Yiddish language. In Alexander Harkavy's Yiddish-English-Hebrew Dictionary of 1898 and at least one later edition, intended for the use of Yiddish-speakers, the English translation offered is merely a bleating or baa sound; by the much-developed 1928 edition, it is translated as an interjection meaning “be as it may”, or the adjective “so-so”. It is more recently defined as "well then; expression of dismissal". Hooray for Yiddish, by Leo Rosten uses the phonetic spelling "mnyeh", capturing its breathy, expressive enunciation by Yiddish-speakers. This pronunciation is echoed by the poet W. H. Auden's use of "mneh", in a dismissive allusion to the Moon landing; Auden was in New York before and after World War Two, and developed a close interest in Jewish conversation and culture.

All the above meanings suggest its close linkage with the Jewish shrug, which is both a staple of acceptable humour among Jews, and of antisemitic caricature. Thus, as a Yiddish word adopted into (American) English, it stems from the interplay of Jews with Anglo-American culture past and present, an ambivalent expression of indifference, either good-humoured or contemptuous.

Some have speculated that the origin is in the Yiddish "feh", which appears in the 1936 Yiddish song "Yidl Mitn Fidl".

== Popularization ==
As early as 1992, meh appeared in a Usenet posting in a discussion referring to the television series Melrose Place.

Meh's popularity surged after its use on the American animated television series The Simpsons. It was first used in the 1994 episode "Sideshow Bob Roberts", when a librarian reacts to Lisa's surprise that voting records are not classified. It also appeared later in "Lisa's Wedding" after Marge weaves the words "Hi Bart" on a loom to try to pique her son's interest in weaving, to which he responds "meh". In the 2001 episode "Hungry, Hungry Homer", Lisa spells out the word for emphasis ("M-E-H"), after Homer tries to interest her (Lisa) and Bart into going to the theme park "Blockoland".

American lexicographer Benjamin Zimmer wrote in 2006, "Whatever Yiddish origins the interjection might have had, they have been lost in post-Simpsons usage." Zimmer contacted Simpsons writer John Swartzwelder, who said "I had originally heard the word from an advertising writer named Howie Krakow back in 1970 or 1971 who insisted it was the funniest word in the world" and "I got the impression it was already very old when Howie told it to me." Zimmer also contacted the writers of the other two episodes but they could not remember where they had heard the word.

Lexicographer Grant Barrett wrote about meh and d'oh, another Simpsons catchphrase: "I suspect they're both just transcribed versions of oral speech, which has any number of single-syllable sounds that mean a variety of things".

The first mainstream print usage of meh occurred in the Canadian newspaper Edmonton Sun in 2003: "Ryan Opray got voted off Survivor. Meh". In December 2009, meh was included in the BBC News Online list of 20 words which defined the decade. On October 14, 2013, ABC News posted on their website under headlines: US Government Shuts Down, World Says, 'Meh'. The New York Times's The One Page Magazine now features a "meh" list.

Meh.com, a daily deals website from Woot founder Matt Rutledge, debuted on July 9, 2014. Rutledge paid $100,000 for the meh.com domain in June 2014.

In The Emoji Movie (2017), the protagonist and his parents are all "Meh" emojis.

== Inclusion in dictionaries ==
In November 2008, the word was added to the Collins English Dictionary, a British publication published by HarperCollins. Cormac McKeown, senior editor for Collins dictionaries, said:

"This is a new interjection from the US that seems to have inveigled its way into common speech over here."

"It was actually spelled out in The Simpsons when Homer is trying to pry the kids away from the TV with a suggestion for a day trip. They both just reply 'meh' and keep watching TV; he asks again and Lisa says 'We said MEH! M-E-H, meh?!'"

Sam Leith, writing in The Daily Telegraph, described the addition of the word, following suggestions received from the public, as a "gimmick", before concluding it was a "useful" word.

=== In Canada ===
HarperCollins' definition of "meh" included a "real example" of usage:

"As in 'the Canadian election was so meh'."

When complaints arose over this choice of example, HarperCollins' lexicographer Cormac McKeown, who chose the election reference, insisted that he meant "no slight to Canada".
