= Centre for Railway Information Systems =

Indian government body

Centre For Railway Information Systems
- Native name: रेलवे सूचना प्रणाली केंद्र
- Type: An organisation under Ministry of Railways
- Industry: IT services IT consulting
- Founded: July 1986; 40 years ago
- Founder: Ministry of Railways
- Headquarters: New Delhi, India
- Area served: India
- Services: Information technology consulting
- Owner: Government of India
- Number of employees: 1150 (2023)
- Website: www.cris.org.in

The Centre for Railway Information Systems (CRIS) designs, develops, implements and maintains most of the important information systems of Indian Railways. It is under the ownership of Government of India and administrative control of the Ministry of Railways. It is located in Chanakyapuri, New Delhi. CRIS was established in 1986.

== History ==
In 1982, Indian Railways (IR) set up a central organization to computerize freight operations (COFOIS). In 1986, this was converted into a dedicated autonomous organization (CRIS), an umbrella organization for all information technology-related activities on Indian Railways. It was tasked with designing, developing and implementing the Freight Operations Information System (FOIS) and its communications infrastructure. CRIS began functioning in July 1986 as an autonomous organization headed by an executive director (later renamed managing director).

A unique feature of CRIS is the collaboration among domain experts from Indian Railways, CRIS' own technical specialists, and leading IT companies of the country. Systems managed by CRIS have been recognized by Computerworld. CRIS received the Prime Minister's Awards for Excellence in Public Administration on 21 April 2008.

CRIS held a symposium, "IT Can Happen in Government", in New Delhi on 1 July 2010 after a previous symposium on 6 July 2009. A seminar on big data was held in July 2014, followed by one on smart cities in July 2015, and another on mobility and mobile apps in 2018. CRIS seminars are held annually, with the most-recent one (on Digital Transformation of Large Enterprises) on 1 July 2019.

In December 2019, the Ministry of Railways was considering a proposal to merge CRIS' operations with RailTel Corporation of India Ltd. However, the proposal has been shelved for the time being.

E-Procurement System provides a secure, fair and transparent method of materials procurement through a web-based interface. It enables suppliers to securely upload their tenders to a central server in encrypted form, which can be decrypted only by authorized railway officials after the tender opening. All timestamps are authenticated by the National Physical Laboratory. The system is operational on all zone railways and units, and has been extended to CORE, RDSO, RailTel and the Kolkata Metro. E-Auction, launched in March 2012, has been adopted by all zone railways and production units. A payment gateway was implemented in January 2012, and about ₹ 280 crore (₹ 2.8 billion) in online funds was transferred by February 2014.

== Work ==
CRIS designs, develops, implements and maintains information systems for Indian Railways. It has also developed and implemented the IT system for the Andaman and Nicobar Islands ship-ticketing, which it currently maintains as well. The number of projects handled by CRIS increased from three in 2000, to more than 80 by 2020. CRIS follows a mixed model of software development, outsourcing some development work while developing software in-house as per need.

== Major IR projects ==
- Computerization of the Freight Operations Information System: FOIS enables management and control of freight movement, optimized asset utilization and the generation of invoices. Many of IR's larger freight customers pay through an electronic payment gateway interfaced with the FOIS. About 72 percent of the railway's freight revenue is paid electronically.
- Passenger Reservation System (PRS): A nationwide online passenger reservation and ticketing system, developed and maintained by CRIS, was developed in C and Fortran on a Digital OpenVMS operating system using RTR (Reliable Transaction Router) as middleware. Also known as CONCERT (Country-wide Network of Computerized Enhanced Reservation and Ticketing), it interconnects the four regional computing systems (in New Delhi, Mumbai, Kolkata and Chennai) into a national PRS grid. It allows a passenger anywhere to book train tickets from any station to any station. PRS handles reservations, changes, cancellations and refunds, reserving over 1.6 million seats and berths daily. Complex rules, validations and fare-computation techniques are interwoven in the application. This system is currently under modernisation.
- Next Generation e-Ticketing (NGeT): The Internet-based E-ticketing reservation system, developed for IRCTC, that connects at the back-end to PRS.
- Computerization of Indian Railways' Unreserved Ticketing System: Unreserved ticketing is a major component of IR's ticket volume, and an important source of revenue. UTS delivers fast unreserved ticketing from dedicated counters, replacing manual printed-card tickets with centralized online sales. The architecture integrates with handheld terminals, smart cards, vending machines and the UTS Mobile app and website utsonmobile.indianrail.gov.in.
- National Train Enquiry System for latest train running times and live train tracking.
- Web-enabled claims: Web-based software enables the public to file and track claims online.
- I-Pas is a comprehensive payroll and accounting system which has been extended throughout Indian Railways.
- Workshop Information SystEm (WISE): A MIS project for railway workshops in Kharagpur, Jagadhri, Ajmer, Kota, Charbagh, Liluah, Kanchrapara, Matunga, Lower Parel, Parel, Bhusawal, Secunderabad, Lallaguda and Jamalpur. WISE provides a report for workshop management using the Oracle DBMS.
- Crew management: The Crew Management System (CMS) software provides real-time railway crew information. Information includes location, status, train assignment, time off and continuing education. The software issues SMS alerts to management and supervisors. It can book crew for coaching, shunting and freight service. The software supports safety monitoring of the crew by inspectors, assessing crew knowledge with a quiz administered through kiosks in crew lobbies, and provides up-to-date safety circulars.
- Control Office Application (COA): Enables rail-traffic controllers to manage trains in their section, and is operational in all division control offices. The COA interfaces with other applications (such as National Train Enquiry System) to provide train information to passengers and managers. Recently, the Real Time Train Information System (RTIS) that enables Satellite Navigation data from train locomotives to directly update the train position in COA in real-time has been partially implemented.
- An ERP-based system was implemented at the Integral Coach Factory in Chennai in January 2012.
