= Yakala.co =

yakala.co
- Company type: Private
- Website type: Group buying
- Available in: Turkish
- Founded: August 2010
- Dissolved: December 2022
- Headquarters: Istanbul, {{{location_country}}}
- No. of locations: (Istanbul, Ankara, İzmir, Bursa, Adana, Antalya)
- Area served: Turkey
- Key people: Mehmet Keteloğlu, founding partner
- Website: yakala.co
- Current status: Offline

yakala.co was a Turkish group-buying website founded in 2010 as a subsidiary of Hürriyet, one of Turkey’s leading media companies. The platform specialized in offering daily deals across six major Turkish cities, catering to a variety of consumer interests, including dining, entertainment, travel, and retail services.

During its operational years, yakala.co was reported to be ranked among the top 500 most-visited websites in Turkey, according to Alexa Internet rankings.

In 2010, yakala.co received industry recognition when it was awarded two Golden Mixx Awards by the Turkish division of the Interactive Advertising Bureau (IAB).

On December 16, 2022, the website officially ceased its operations, marking the end of its 12-year run.
