= PTB =

PTB may refer to:

== Government and politics ==
- Bermuda Public Transportation Board
- Bessarabian Peasants' Party (Romanian: Partidul Țărănesc din Basarabia), a political party in the Kingdom of Romania
- Brazilian Labour Party (1945) (Portuguese: Partido Trabalhista Brasileiro), dismantled after the 1964 military-led coup d'état
- Brazilian Labour Party (1981) (Portuguese: Partido Trabalhista Brasileiro), merged with Patriota to form the new Democratic Renewal Party in 2022.
- Pakistan Tobacco Board
- Party of Labour of Burkina (French: Parti du Travail de Burkina), a political party in Burkina Faso
- Physikalisch-Technische Bundesanstalt, the national metrology institute of Germany
- Workers' Party of Belgium (French: Parti du Travail de Belgique), a Belgian political party

== Science and medicine ==
- N-Phenacylthiazolium bromide, a cross-link breaker
- Permian-Triassic boundary, a mass extinction event
- Phosphotyrosine-binding domain (PTB-domain), a protein domain
- Polypyrimidine tract-binding protein, an RNA-binding protein
- Pulmonary tuberculosis, manifestation of tuberculosis in the lungs

== Technology ==
- Project team builder, a project management simulator
- Public Test Build, in software testing
- Push to break, electronics push switch
- Packet Too Big, an ICMPv6 message; see IPv6 packet
- Pounds of salt per thousand barrels of crude oil; see Desalter
- .ptb, a file extension used by musical tablature authoring tool Power Tab Editor

== Transport ==
- Pentre-bach railway station, in Wales
- Petit train de banlieue, a passenger train in Senegal
- Petersburg station, an Amtrak station serving Petersburg, Virginia
- Voepass Linhas Aéreas, a Brazilian airline

== Other uses ==
- P.T.B (album), by rapcore group Kingspade
- Placer Theatre Ballet, an American ballet company
- Portland Trail Blazers, an American professional basketball team
- Proto-Tibeto-Burman language
- Proto-Torres-Banks language, a reconstructed language from Vanuatu

== See also ==
- PTP (disambiguation)
- The powers that be (disambiguation)
