= PTP =

PTP may refer to:

== Science and technology ==
- Peak-to-peak, an amplitude of a signal
- Permeability transition pore, a mitochondrial channel protein complex
- Post-tetanic potentiation, a short-lived form of synaptic plasticity
- Post-transfusion purpura, a type of adverse reaction to a blood transfusion
- Protein tyrosine phosphatase, a group of enzymes

=== Computing ===
- PET Transfer Protocol, a file transfer protocol developed for Commodore-based bulletin boards
- Picture Transfer Protocol, a protocol for digital cameras
- Precision Time Protocol, a time synchronization protocol

== Music ==
- PTP (artist collective), an American experimental music collective and record label
- PTP (band) (Programming the Psychodrill), an American industrial music group, side project of Ministry
- Pay Money to My Pain, a Japanese rock band
- Phonation threshold pressure, the amount of air pressure required to initiate vibration of the vocal cords

== Organisations ==
- Pheu Thai Party, a political party in Thailand
- Portuguese Labour Party, a left-of-centre political party in Portugal
- Togolese Party of Progress, a defunct political party in Togoland

== Places ==
- Pointe-à-Pitre International Airport (IATA code), Guadeloupe
- Port of Tanjung Pelepas, in Johor, Malaysia

== Other uses ==
- Practitioner Training Programme, of the UK Modernising Scientific Careers initiative
- Professional transportation planner, an American personal certification program
- Publicly traded partnership, a limited partnership whose interests are regularly traded on an established securities market.

== See also ==
- Peer-to-peer (P2P)
- Point-to-point (disambiguation)
- P2P (disambiguation)
- PTB (disambiguation)
- RTR (disambiguation)
