= Stolař =

Stolař (Czech feminine: Stolařová) is a Czech language occupational surname which means joiner. Notable people with the surname include:

- Bernie Stolar, American businessman
- Václav Stolař (1893–1969), Czech gymnast
