= AppSumo =

Ecommerce website

Sumo Group, Inc.
- Website type: Daily deal
- Available in: English
- Owner: Noah Kagan
- Website: appsumo.com
- Current status: Active

AppSumo is a daily deals website for digitally distributed goods and online services. AppSumo was founded in March 2010 by serial online entrepreneur Noah Kagan.

== Operations ==
Initially, AppSumo focused only on digital tools, such as SaaS apps that offered lifetime deals. Today, the majority of deals offered are learning based products attempting to teach customers skills such as programming languages, project management, and hiring practices.

AppSumo deals exclusively with digitally distributed goods. The deals include application software (apps), ebooks, learning courses, and other packages. Many of the site's deals are aimed towards productivity products and website tools, such as copywriting courses, email marketing, or project management apps. In 2015, AppSumo started a sister company called Sumo that sells marketing tools to help online businesses grow. AppSumo takes a percentage of sales from every deal, typically 50%.
