= ScholarBuys =

Academic Technology Reseller

ScholarBuys LLC
- Company type: Private
- Industry: Software, Education
- Founded: 2007
- Headquarters: Carpentersville, Illinois, United States
- Key people: Matt Ryan; (co-founder); Bob Smith; (co-founder)
- Revenue: ▲$22.1 million (2017)
- Number of employees: 9
- Website: www.scholarbuys.com

ScholarBuys is an academic marketing company located in Carpentersville, Illinois, co-founded by Matt Ryan and Bob Smith. ScholarBuys uses group buying to leverage economies of scale in software licensing. The company provides software, hardware, and cloud solutions to colleges and universities, with a particular focus on private and independent institutions. ScholarBuys is known for its strategic partnerships with state-level higher education associations and consortia, helping member institutions optimize licensing agreements and reduce technology costs.

== History ==
Founded in Carpentersville, Illinois, ScholarBuys began as a niche reseller focused on academic software licensing. Over time, the company expanded its offerings to include cloud services, cybersecurity solutions, and strategic procurement consulting. Company revenues doubled between 2008 and 2010, and the firm launched an offshoot brand, VarsityBuys, which targets students, rather than college administrators.

ScholarBuys is a recognized Microsoft partner and has extensive experience managing the Microsoft Enrollment for Education Solutions (EES) program.

The company has been named to Inc Magazine's Inc. 5000 list four different times (2012, 2013, 2017, and 2018), including a ranking at #41 on the "Top 100" companies in Education.

== Services ==
ScholarBuys provides a range of services tailored to the academic sector, including:

- Microsoft EES licensing and Copilot deployment
- Adobe Creative Cloud and VIP agreements
- Cloud migration and cybersecurity solutions
- Strategic procurement consulting
- Support for consortia and collaborative purchasing groups
