= Alejandro Freund =

Alejandro Freund is an Ecuadorian entrepreneur and business executive. He co-founded the online marketplace YaEsta.com, ran Rappi's Ecuadorian operation from its launch in 2019 until early 2022, and then led the Chilean employee-benefits company Betterfly in Ecuador and Peru.

== Early life and education ==
Freund is from Quito. He studied business administration at the University of San Andrés in Argentina and went on to a master's degree in economics and management of innovation and technology at Bocconi University in Milan. Before graduate school he spent two years in private banking.

== Career ==
=== YaEsta.com ===
In 2013 Freund and Martín Jara, whom he had met as a student in Argentina, returned to Ecuador and founded Revolucionatuprecio.com, a group buying site backed by the incubator Kruger Labs. The site became the online marketplace YaEsta.com. It started with 21 products from four suppliers; by late 2015 it carried 1,500 products from 100 Ecuadorian suppliers and offered cash on delivery. In 2021 Primicias reported that the research firm CB Insights had placed YaEsta.com among the best-funded startups in Latin America.

The partners sold the company to Grupo Laar, an Ecuadorian logistics group, in early 2019. Freund later described the sale as winding the company down.

=== Rappi ===
The same year, Rappi chose Freund to open its Ecuadorian operation. The delivery app began working in Quito in September 2019 with 30 employees and about 400 couriers. Rappi presented the service formally in November, by which time it had 100,000 registered users and was also running in Guayaquil. A year later the app had been downloaded 500,000 times and worked with 4,500 shops and restaurants and more than 3,500 couriers in the two cities. By September 2021 the Ecuadorian business had about 100 direct employees, handled some 400,000 orders a month and operated in six cities.

Freund left Rappi in early 2022 after about three years in charge. He told Forbes Ecuador that he remained a partner and adviser to the Ecuadorian business.

=== Betterfly ===
In April 2022 Betterfly named Freund country officer for Ecuador as it prepared to enter the market in partnership with the insurer Chubb. The app went live in Ecuador on 15 June 2022. Freund said the company expected to invest US$10 million in the country over 24 months and would charge employers US$6.99 per employee per month. In November 2022 Betterfly announced that he would also run its newly opened Peruvian operation. Betterfly closed its businesses in Ecuador and Peru, along with three other countries, in March 2025.

=== Other activities ===
Freund is a co-founder of Polo in the Andes, which organises the Copa Credit Suisse polo tournament at the Quito Polo Club.
