= Matt Rutledge =

American Internet entrepreneur (born 1972)

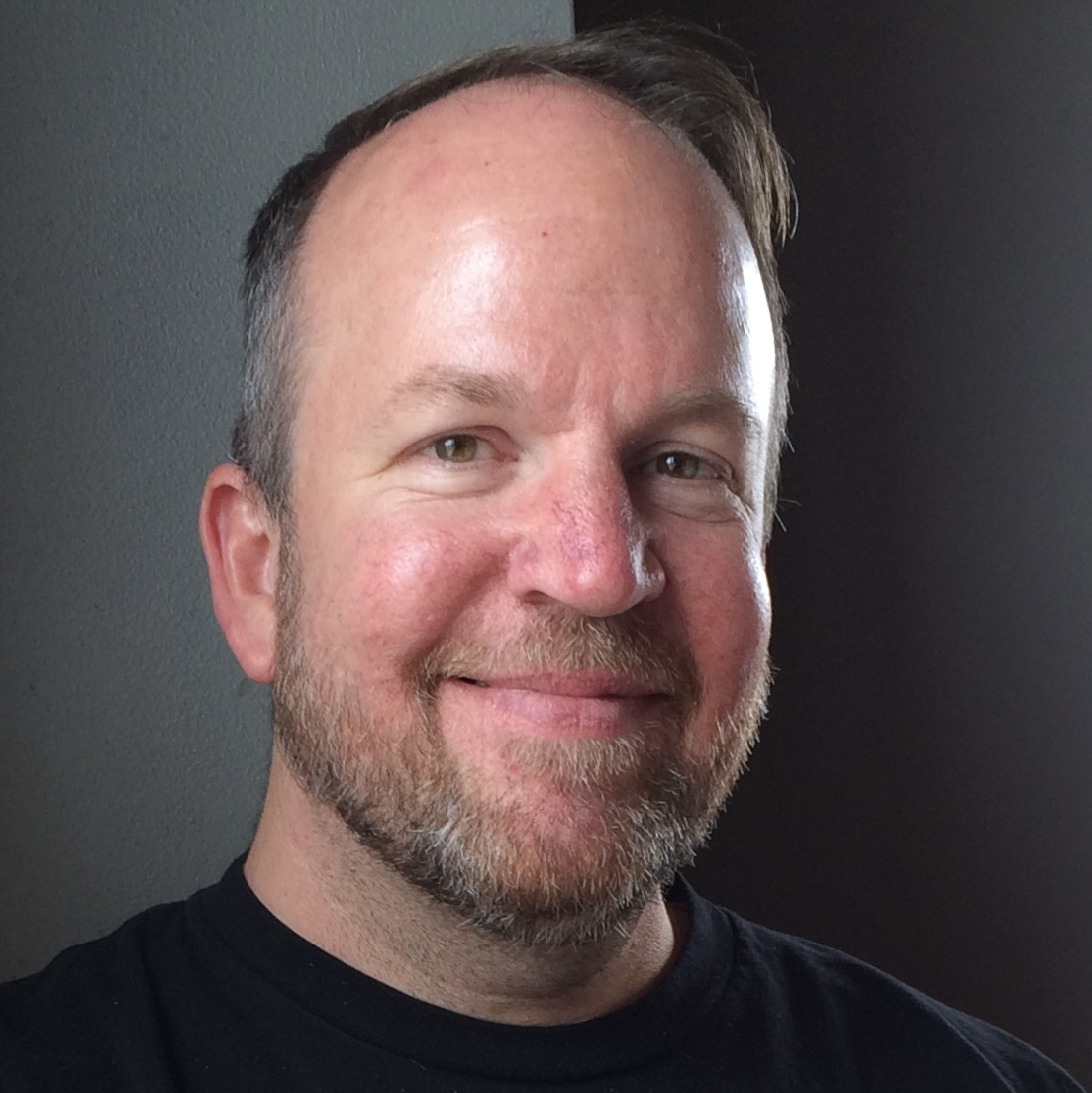
- Born: 1972 (age 53–54); San Antonio, Texas
- Occupation: Internet entrepreneur

Matt Rutledge (born 1972) is an American Internet entrepreneur, best known as the founder and former CEO of the daily deal site Woot. Woot was acquired by Amazon in 2010, and Rutledge resigned his position at Amazon in 2012. Rutledge launched a new daily-deal site, Meh, in 2014.

== Early life ==
Rutledge grew up in San Antonio and Carrollton, Texas. He was an undistinguished high school student. He then moved to the St. Louis, Missouri area to live with his mother, but returned to Texas to avoid paying some $8,000 in traffic tickets.

== Origins and Founding of Woot ==
While working at a Dallas-area computer retailer called Resource Concepts, Rutledge began attending the monthly First Saturday swap meets, selling refurbished PC parts from a truck in the wee hours of the morning. In 1994, Rutledge launched his first company, Synapse Micro, wholesaling tech products to primarily mom-and-pop computer shops.

In 2004, Rutledge launched Woot as an outgrowth of Synapse Micro, offering a single product a day at steeply discounted prices. "I wanted it to be a blog and a store at the same time," Rutledge told Inc. Magazine. To that end, he encouraged the site's copywriters to be entertainingly frank about the shortcomings of the often obsolete products sold on the site. "We feel that if we don't do a good job describing what's wrong with a product, people will assume we just don't know. That's where most retailers fail. To them, every product is perfect."

After four years of rapid growth, in 2008 Woot was named the #1 Fastest Growing Private Retail Company in America and the #1 Fastest Growing Private Company in the Dallas-Fort Worth Area by Inc..

== Acquisition by Amazon ==
In June 2010, Amazon acquired Woot for a reported $110 million. Rutledge remained as CEO. The company's headquarters remained in Carrollton, although the creative and web development team, previously based in St. Louis, moved to the Amazon campus in Seattle.

Amazon's ownership of Woot was characterized by increasing complexity of the company's simple business model, moving away from the deal-of-the-day approach to a broader collection of flash sales. Critics claimed that the post-acquisition Woot lost much of its appeal. Woot "was just too eccentric to slot smoothly into a big company that thrives on being orderly. So all those crazy edges got hacked off until it did fit," wrote CNET blogger Amanda Kooser in 2013. "This approach is all Amazon knows. It's just too bad it had to stomp out a fun little corner of geek commerce and camaraderie in the process."

Rutledge largely agreed with these criticisms and took some of the responsibility for them, saying he was "unable to represent our needs in a succinct, convincing manner" within Amazon. "The goal-based tactical needs of Amazon were unable to appreciate a relatively small artful business model with different growth drivers."

== Founding of Mediocre Laboratories and meh.com ==
Rutledge left Woot in 2012 citing his greater interest in creating and growing new companies than in managing an Amazon subsidiary.

His first public project after leaving Woot was A Mediocre Corporation, so named, in Rutledge's words, "to lower expectations with the brand". Rutledge paid $100,000 for the meh.com domain in June 2014.

A Mediocre Corporation launched Meh.com in July 2014, preceded by a Kickstarter campaign describing Meh as a revival of "The Classic Daily Deal Site". "The underlying premise is that we're building a store that you don't need to buy anything from to have fun," Rutledge told Business Insider.
