= CashCashPinoy =

Philippine deal of the day website

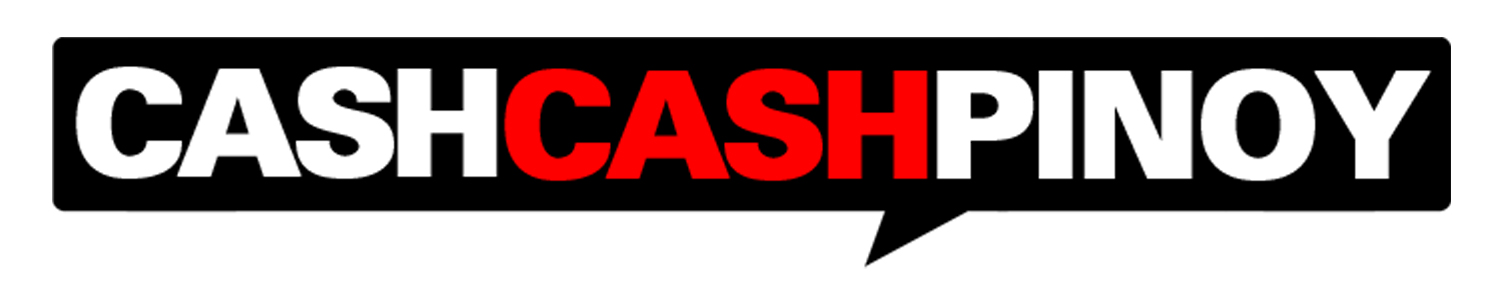
- Type: Privately Held Company
- Industry: Internet
- Founded: 2010
- Founder: Frederic Levy; Laurent Goirand; Sebastien Caudron; Glecy Lopez-Go
- Fate: Inactive website (as of 13 July 2017)
- Headquarters: Ortigas Center, Pasig, Philippines
- Area served: Philippines
- Services: Online shopping
- Number of employees: 50+ (2016)
- Website: www.cashcashpinoy.com

CashCashPinoy is a privately held Philippine deal of the day website that sells products, services and travel packages. Formerly located at Lepanto Building Makati, the office is now located in Pasig, Philippines. The website was officially launched in September 2010 and as of 2015 it had 1.5 million members.

The company set up a retail service for Philippine customers such as IT specialists, sales coordinators, graphic designers, photographers, editors, financial & HR, customer support, logistics, marketing, eCRM specialists etc.

As of 13 July 2017, the company's official website was inactive and displayed a message about a "time out" of business activities.

== History ==
The term "CashCashPinoy" was coined using the words cash (for the discount aspect) and pinoy (an informal demonym referring to the local Filipino people). The company was founded by Frederic Levy, together with two other French people and a Filipino entrepreneur.

The store was initially a self-funded business together with seed funding from angel investors from the UK, US, and Germany. On May 13, 2011, a new type of payment allowed customers to pay for their purchases using 7-Connect (7-Eleven’s e-commerce payment system). the store also partnered with Coins.ph, a bitcoin exchange company, to allow purchases using bitcoin.

Frederic Levy left the company in January 2015, succeeded by Sebastian L’Hermitte as the CEO of Moonline Inc. Hermitte as CEO, he introduced the Fast-Track delivery wherein customers can get the item the same day they purchased it.

As of 13 July 2017, the company's official website is inactive and displays a message about a "time out" of business activities.

== CashCashPinoy.com ==
The website is a membership-based online retail site that uses a flash sales-style model. The site offers a wide range of discounted products and service vouchers. Subscribed customers receive daily email roundups, and can pay for goods in a range of ways (Bank Card, Over-the-counter (finance), bitcoin and cash-on-collection and others), while purchased items can be shipped to directly to customers' home or their preferred address.

The site proposes 10 to 15 new event sales to its members daily. New sales usually last from 6 to 8 days and also feature merchandise from a single brand to small groups of brands. While for services and package tour deal they are featured for 8 to 10 days.

== Technology ==
CashCashPinoy released REVO, a new version of its proprietary platform. It handles data from product sourcing and fulfillment to IT, data analysis, content creation, fraud management to customer support. Recently, they launched CashCashLAB, a new customer feedback program where company executives and selected members continuously meet on a monthly basis to exchange ideas about improving their service for its members. As a result of the first session of CashCashLAB, the company decided to launch CashCashBack, an exclusive new loyalty program for members which allows them to earn points that are equivalent to cash every time they shop. Another previous output is allowing payment for orders via COD.

== Funding ==
In 2011, the company received a seed money investment of US$300,000 mainly from Seed money. In 2012, the company received additional funding of US$1,400,000 from Angel Investor from international and Filipino successful entrepreneurs. In October 2014, the company has raised US$2,000,000 from Singapore-based Private Equity firm, Hera Capital. To date, CashCashPinoy has secured around US$4 million in total financing since establishing operations in 2010, which made it one of the most funded startups in the country.

== Digital Commerce Association ==
CashCashPinoy is a co-founder of the Digital Commerce Association of the Philippines (DCOM), and Frederic Levy has served as the vice president of the non-profit organization.

== Awards ==
In 2015, CashCashPinoy received the Golden Globe Annual Award for Business Excellence in the category "Best e-commerce website".
