= Railway crew management in India =

Indian Railway, the world's largest network (under a single management), consists of more than 100,000 Loco Pilots (Drivers) and Train Managers (Guards), which forms the basic functioning team, responsible for Train Operations. They are the highest salaried staffs among the group C staffs in Indian Railways and get many more benefits.

== Classification of Loco Pilots and Train Managers ==
Loco Pilots are responsible for running the locomotive. The entry level position for this title is Assistant Loco Pilot. Assistant Loco Pilots work on freight trains for as long as 10–12 years. During this tenure they work with experienced Loco Pilots and perform assisting work in piloting the locomotive. After further courses and practical training, they are promoted to Loco Pilot Shunter. A Loco Pilot Shunter is limited to driving locomotives in sheds/yards no faster than 15 km/h. After a minimum experience of two years, they are promoted as Loco Pilot (Passenger or Freight). New Loco Pilots are monitored by their respective Loco Inspectors.

A train has typical an Assistant Loco Pilot and a Loco Pilot on the Locomotive. The Assistants are normally common but Loco Pilots fall in various categories like Freight Loco Pilots for running Freight trains, Passenger Loco Pilots for running slow moving Passenger Trains, Mail Express Loco Pilot for running high speed Passenger Trains and Rajdhani Loco Pilots for running very high speed passenger trains. There is yet another category of crew called 'Shunters' who operate only in yards, for moving trains within a particular station yard. Normally Shunters work alone without an Assistant.

A Loco Pilot works on a particular train under the guidance of the Train Manager of the train, like train route, limited train speed, prediction of signalling error, sufficient brake power, safety etc. The train at the rear end has Train Manager as its crew, he is the head of the running train. Train Managers are Traffic Running Staffs. They work on freight trains (goods and parcel trains) for 5–6 years, after that they are promoted to passenger trains, then mail & express trains, Rajdhani & Shatabdi trains.

== Earlier working scenario ==
The job of a Loco Pilot consists of irregular rest and working hours, eating disorders, and sleep disorders. That is why the Railway spends a lot on their trainings and resting time. They are booked from a crew changing point, informed well in advance, after ensuring that they have taken sufficient rest and completed all required trainings and requirements, those are mandatory for train operation. At the end of the journey, they are sent to well maintained rest rooms, given meals (home cooked) and rebooked back to their headquarters after giving minimum stipulated rest.

== Latest developments ==
Centre for Railway Information Systems New Delhi, an IT development unit for Indian Railways, has developed a software named "Crew Management System", wherein bookings of this sensitive category of people, which was done manually till now and monitored at various levels by Inspectors and Officers, is arranged through software. Crew Management System (CMS) is a unique system in which accuracy and monitoring is automatically maintained. The software system was rolled out in December 2007 and already installed at about 2200 data entry nodes at over 290 crew booking points. These are spread over entire Indian Railways. CMS at present has a database covering 89,000 crew members and over 30000 crew members are being booked daily through the system. The work has been completed and provided with Thin clients connected to a server cluster at CRIS, wherein all the functions like crew bookings, call served to crews, their signing on duties are done through computers after ensuring their rest, training and medical particulars. The job which was done manually till a few years back is now monitored automatically. Not only it has a single data base of all the running staff of Indian Railways, but also have an all around reports (more than 500 reports of these crews are visible to the monitoring authorities of the Railways). All the officers sitting in their offices can monitor performance reports of the train operating staff.

== Sources ==
- CMS on Economic Times "Railways Get ticket to ride"
- Automated crew booking at Ind Rlys
- Article in Times of India
- "Computerworld Honour Program Finalist". cwhonors.org. Archived from the original on July 16, 2011.
- Article by Network Computing
- Indian Railways automating crew management
- Instructions to railway drivers and guards now via mobile SMS
- Now, tech-savvy railways to keep tab on staff through web-based system
- CRIS get CIO bold award for Crew Management System
- Contribution of Thinvent to the Crew Management System project
