= RTR =

RTR may refer to:

== Media ==
- Radiotelevisiun Svizra Rumantscha (previously Radio e Televisiun Rumantscha), a Swiss broadcasting company
- Reformed Theological Review, an Australian Protestant theological journal
- Return to Ravnica, a Magic the Gathering block
- Rome: Total Realism, a complete modification pack for the computer game Rome: Total War
- Rossiya 1 (previously RTR), a state-owned Russian television channel
- RTRFM, a not-for-profit, community radio station based in Perth, Western Australia

== Military ==
- Royal Tank Regiment, of the British Army
- Royal Tasmania Regiment, of the Australian Army

== Technology ==
- HP RTR, Reliable Transaction Router
- Real-time recovery from an IT infrastructure failure
- Remote transmission request on a CAN bus
- Unix RTR, a real-time operating system

== Places ==
- Remedios T. Romualdez, Philippines
- Rochester railway station, Kent, England
- Russian Tea Room, New York City, US

== Other uses ==
- Retracted tongue root, in speech
- Rent the Runway, a dress rental service
- RTR Vehicles, a Ford Mustang tuning shop
- Rigs-to-Reefs, conversion of oil rigs into artificial reefs
- Rubber Tramp Rendezvous, an annual gathering of van-dwellers in Arizona, US
- Third Republic Movement (Ruch Trzeciej Rzeczypospolitej), a defunct Polish political party
