= Where Is My Train =

Indian train tracking application

- Developers: Sigmoid Labs, Google LLC
- Release: 20 June 2015; 11 years ago
- Stable release: 7.1.5 / January 9, 2025; 19 months ago
- Operating system: Android, iOS
- Platform: Mobile app
- Service name: Travel & Local
- Size: 22 MB
- Available in: 12 languages
- List of languages English · Hindi · Bangla · Marathi · Malayalam · Kannada · Tamil · Telugu · Punjabi · Odia · Assamese · Gujarati
- Type: Travel, Navigation
- Website: whereismytrain.in
- As of: 2026

Where Is My Train is a mobile application owned by Google LLC that provides real-time tracking and status information for trains operated by Indian Railways, as well as local and metro trains in selected Indian cities. The application was originally developed by Sigmoid Labs, a startup founded by former TiVo Corporation engineers, and was acquired by Google in December 2018.

== History ==
=== Development and Launch ===
Where Is My Train was launched in June 2015 for Android devices by Sigmoid Labs, a Bangalore-based startup. The application distinguished itself from competitors through its innovative use of cell tower data to track train locations, enabling offline functionality—a critical feature for Indian railway passengers who often travel through areas with limited internet connectivity.

The app quickly gained popularity among Indian Railways passengers, accumulating over 10 million downloads on the Google Play store within its first three years.

=== Google Acquisition ===
In December 2018, Google acquired Sigmoid Labs, the parent company of Where Is My Train. The acquisition was part of Google's strategy to expand its presence in the Indian market and enhance its travel and navigation services. Following the acquisition, Google continued to develop and maintain the application under its own brand.

In 2018, prior to the acquisition, the app received a nomination for "India's Best Apps of 2018" in the Google Play Store.

=== iOS Launch ===
In June 2025, Google launched an iOS version of Where Is My Train on the Apple App Store, expanding the application's availability to iPhone and iPad users.

== Features ==
=== Core Functionality ===
Where Is My Train provides several key features for railway passengers:

- Real-time train tracking: Displays current location and running status of trains using data from multiple sources including GPS, cell tower triangulation, and official railway systems.
- Offline capability: The application can estimate train positions using cached data and cell tower information even without an active internet connection, a feature particularly useful in areas with poor network coverage.
- Train schedule information: Provides complete timetables, routes, and station lists for all Indian Railways trains.
- Trains between stations: Allows users to search for all available trains between any two stations with departure and arrival times.
- PNR status checking: Enables passengers to check their PNR (Passenger Name Record) status and receive automatic updates.
- Delay predictions: Uses historical data and current running status to predict delays and estimated arrival times.
- Platform information: Shows platform numbers and track changes when available.
- Train alarms: Location-based alerts that notify users when approaching their destination station.

=== Technology ===
The application employs multiple technologies to provide accurate train tracking:

- Cell tower triangulation: Pioneered by Sigmoid Labs, this method uses mobile phone connections to nearby cell towers to estimate train positions, enabling offline tracking.
- Crowdsourced data: Collects anonymized location data from users traveling on trains to improve tracking accuracy.
- Station-based reporting: Incorporates manual reports from station masters and control rooms through the National Train Enquiry System (NTES).

=== Language Support ===
The application supports 12 Indian languages: English, Hindi, Bengali, Marathi, Malayalam, Kannada, Tamil, Telugu, Punjabi, Odia, Assamese, and Gujarati, making it accessible to users across different regions of India.

== Web Platform ==
In addition to the mobile applications, a web-based version of the service is available at whereismytrain.org, providing instant access to train information without requiring app installation. The web platform offers core features including live train tracking and trains-between-stations search, with data cached locally for limited offline access.

== Reception ==
Where Is My Train has been widely adopted by Indian railway passengers, with over 500+ million downloads on Android and a rating of 4.5+ stars on the Google Play Store. The application has been praised for its offline functionality and accuracy in tracking train locations, particularly in areas with poor internet connectivity.

The app's innovative use of cell tower data for offline tracking has been recognized as a significant technological achievement in the Indian mobile app ecosystem, addressing the specific challenges of railway travel in India where internet connectivity can be intermittent.

== See also ==
- Indian Railways
- National Train Enquiry System
- Mobile app
- GPS navigation device
- Real-time locating system
