= Nivio Ziviani =

Brazilian computer scientist

- Born: August 27, 1946 (age 80); Belo Horizonte, Minas Gerais, Brazil
- Education: University of Waterloo; Pontifical Catholic University of Rio de Janeiro; Federal University of Minas Gerais
- Known for: Akwan Information Technologies
- Scientific career
- Fields: Computer science
- Doctoral advisor: Gaston Gonnet

Nivio Ziviani (born 27 August 1946) is a Brazilian computer scientist working primarily in information retrieval and recommendation systems. He is an emeritus professor in the Computer Science department of the Federal University of Minas Gerais, where he leads the Laboratory for Treating Information (LATIN). Ziviani is known for cofounding multiple companies, including Akwan Information Technologies, bought by Google in 2005 and Kunumi, bought by Banco Bradesco (a large Brazilian Bank) in 2024

== Biography ==
As a child, Ziviani suffered from polio. Ziviani went on to obtain a bachelor's degree in mechanical engineering from the Federal University of Minas Gerais, 1971, a master's degree in informatics from the Pontifical Catholic University of Rio de Janeiro, 1976, and a Ph.D. in computer science from the University of Waterloo, 1982, where we has supervised by Gaston Gonnet. Ziviani played an important role in establishing Computer Science undergraduate courses in Brazil.

Throughout his career, he cofounded multiple startups that were later acquired by larger companies. In 1998, he cofounded the Miner Technology Group in 1998, which was acquired by Grupo Folha de S.Paulo/UOL in 1999. In 2000, he cofounded the Akwan Information Technologies in 2000, bought by Google in 2005. Google went on to establish its headquarters in Latin America in Belo Horizonte, Brazil, after the purchase. In 2016, he cofounded the start-up Kunumi, which was acquired by Banco Bradesco (a large Brazilian Bank) in 2024

== Books ==
- Projeto de Algoritmos Com implementações em Pascal e em C (Cengage Learning, ISBN 9788522110506, Third Edition, 2010) (in Portuguese). This book was also published in Spanish.
- Projeto de Algoritmos Com implementações em Java e C++ (Thomson Learning, ISBN 85-221-0525-1, Second Edition, 2007) (in Portuguese).

== Awards ==
Ziviani has received multiple honors and awards, including:

- Being elected a member of the Brazilian Academy of Sciences.
- Being appointed to the Brazilian, National Order of Scientific Merit as a Commendator.
