= Viewdle =

Ukrainian technology company

Viewdle is a Ukrainian facial recognition company. Google was reportedly close to closing a deal to buy the company for between $30 and $45 million in October 2012. In October 2012, Google bought Viewdle to improve Android's augmented reality and face recognition. The company is an expert in the field of computer vision.

Viewdle's face and object recognition technologies has been widely used in search technology. In 2011, Google launched its image search based on this technology.

In 2014, Google closed the company, forcing Ukrainian programmers to move to the US office of Motorola Mobility. Viewdle employees moved to the United States, where they joined the Motorola Mobility team and the Motorola ATAP group. Viewdle began preparing for closure immediately after the deal was finalized. According to Denis Melentyev, who headed the Ukrainian office, his contract with the company expired in October. He was supposed to close the division in Ukraine by that date. Most of Viewdle's team moved to the United States after the purchase of the company and joined Motorola Mobility, which was owned by Google until the end of 2014. After relocation to the US office in Sunnyvale, a Viewdle team joined the Advanced Technology and Projects(ATAP) under Regina Dugan's supervision.

== Founding ==
Viewdle was founded in 2006 by Yegor Anchishkin and Yuriy Musatenko, who saw a commercial success in the technology developed by the Kyiv Institute of Cybernetics in the field of image recognition; moreover, Viewdle's core R&D team includes tech co-founders Anrii Tsarov, Denis Otchenashko, Ivan Kovtun, and Konstantin Milstein who were instrumental in the startup's growth from pre-seed to exit. The initial investment was raised from the businessmen Yuri Frayman from the Ukrainian diaspora in the USA.

In 2008, Anthem Venture Partners bought a 25% stake of the company's for $2 million. In October 2010, the second round of investment took place with Qualcomm Ventures, BlackBerry Partners Fund and Best Buy Capital which invested $10 million, valuing the company at $13.5 million.
