= Wavii =

Developer of iPhone app

- Available in: English
- Owner: Alphabet Inc.
- Commercial: yes
- Launched: Late 2008
- Current status: Active (Integrated in Google)

Wavii was a Seattle startup founded by Adrian Aoun in 2008, and was subsequently acquired by Google, Inc. in April 2013. Wavii developed an iPhone app that allowed users to follow topics (e.g., a company, celebrity, politician, athlete, city, etc.) and receive short updates about them in their feed. This app was based on data produced by Wavii's proprietary technology, which used natural-language-processing and machine-learning approaches to convert content on the web (e.g., news articles and blogs) into structured summaries of the stories they contained.

Wavii's team was primarily former Last.fm, Microsoft, and Amazon engineers.

== Google acquisition ==
On April 30, 2013 it was announced that Google, Inc. had acquired Wavii for an amount that was officially undisclosed, but which industry insiders claimed was over US$30 million. The acquisition was viewed as a way for Google to expand their ability to understand the web for search and to summarize content.

Google discontinued the Wavii iPhone app and website, but the company reported that it is continuing to run Wavii's technology and produce feed content for applications within Google.

Following the acquisition Wavii's team relocated from Seattle to the San Francisco Bay area.
