= Akwan Information Technologies =

Brazil-based search engine company co-founded by Nivio Ziviani

Akwan Information Technologies was a search engine company based in Belo Horizonte, Brazil, cofounded by Nivio Ziviani. It was acquired by Google on July 20, 2005. It was Google's first acquisition in Brazil. Akwan had the University of Minas Gerais and the Brazilian Fund for Capital as partners. It became Google's research and development center for Latin America.
