= Postini =

Discontinued service owned by Google

Postini, Inc.
- Developer: Google (acquired in 2007)
- Initial release: 1999; 27 years ago
- Final release: / 2014
- Platform: Cross-platform web service
- Type: E-mail and Web security
- Website: google.com/postini/

Postini, Inc. was an e-mail, Web security, and archiving service owned by Google from 2007 until its closure. It provided cloud computing services for filtering e-mail spam and malware (before it was delivered to a client's mail server), offered optional e-mail archiving, and protected client networks from web-borne malware. In November 2011, Google announced the discontinuation of Postini in August 2012.

== History ==
Postini was a startup company founded in 1999 by Shinya Akamine, Gordon Irlam, Brian Maggi, and Scott Petry in Redwood City, California, United States. It was backed by August Capital, with second-round funding from August as well as Summit Partners Accelerator Fund and Sun Microsystems. By February 2005, it was operating ten U.S. data centers, processing 2.5 billion e-mail messages weekly, and providing anti-spam services for more than 4,200 companies and "6 million end users, including workers at Merrill Lynch, Circuit City, Rayovac, and Hormel Foods, the company that makes Spam, the canned meat product". Later in 2005 it moved to nearby San Carlos, California.

On July 9, 2007, Google announced that it had signed a definitive agreement to acquire Postini. Google paid $625 million in cash for the acquisition. The former company's services were then marketed as "Google Postini Services."

In September 2011, Google announced it would discontinue a number of its products, including Google Web Security, which was acquired by Google as part of Postini. On August 21, 2012, Google announced it would be shutting down all of Postini's web services and folding the service's users into Google Apps. After a multi-year migration effort, the last customers were migrated to Google Apps in the second half of 2015.

== See also ==
- List of mergers and acquisitions by Google
- Exchange Online Protection, competing product by Microsoft
- IronPort, competing product by Cisco
