= Map analysis =

Physical and cultural study of maps

A map analysis is a study of map types, i.e. political maps, military maps, contour lines etc., and the unique physical qualities of a map, i.e. scale, title, legend etc. It is also a way of decoding the message and symbols of the map and placing them within their proper spatial and cultural context, as well as identifying changes in features and landscapes.
