= Adscape =

San Francisco in-game advertising company

Adscape Media, Inc.
- Type: Subsidiary
- Industry: Mobile advertising
- Founded: February 2006; 20 years ago
- Headquarters: Mountain View, California, U.S.
- Parent: Google

Adscape Media, Inc. was a San Francisco in-game advertising company specializing in dynamic ad delivery integrated into video game narratives. The technology allowed the placement of both static and dynamic advertisements within interactive entertainment on PC, console, and mobile platforms.

Founded in 2002 by former Nortel engineer Dan Willis, the company launched in February 2006 with $3.2 million in funding from HIG Ventures, an Atlanta-based venture capital firm. On February 15, 2007, Adscape was acquired by Google for US$23 million.

== History ==
=== Operations ===
Adscape moved from its offices in Atlanta to Google's headquarters in Mountain View, California, in March 2007.

=== Acquisition by Google ===
Google's acquisition of the company grants it Adscape's patents related to advertising technologies in video games.

This acquisition was partly fueled by Microsoft's purchase of in-game advertisement company Massive Incorporated, which already has secured deals with game publishers including Ubisoft, THQ, and Take-Two Interactive, for $200 million in 2006.

After the acquisition, Adscape's core technology, AdverPlay, was merged into Google Adsense, aligning its dynamic in-game advertising system with Google's broader digital advertising ecosystem.

=== Leadership ===
The company's leadership includes Dan Willis as Chief Technical Officer, Bernie Stolar as Chairman, and Eva Woo as vice president of marketing.

Adscape's board was chaired by industry veteran Bernie Stolar, who joined as an adviser and director shortly before the acquisition.

== See also ==
- Zenreach
