= Reqwireless =

Software company

Reqwireless was a software company specializing in delivering HTML and rich email content to Java ME/MIDP-capable cellphones. Reqwireless was acquired by Google in July 2005.

Reqwireless WebViewer is a Web browser for Java ME MIDP devices. WebViewer supports HTML along with GIF and JPEG images, providing users of mobile Java devices with access to the real Web. WebViewer is not a WAP browser. WebViewer is just 48K as a JAR file and is built upon ReqwirelessWeb, a class library for fetching and rendering HTML. WebViewer supports the following features:

- HTML, including forms and image maps
- GIF, JPEG, PNG, and BMP images
- HTTP, FTP, and gopher resources
- HTTP cookies
- JavaScript
- HTTP Basic authentication
- HTTPS (if supported by the device)
- Bookmarks
- History
- Web cache
