= PostRank =

Social media analytics service

PostRank Inc.
- Company type: Private
- Industry: Web analytics
- Predecessor: AideRSS Inc.
- Founded: July 2007
- Founder: Ilya Grigorik
- Defunct: May 1, 2012
- Fate: Acquired by Google on June 6, 2011
- Headquarters: Waterloo, Canada
- Products: PostRank Analytics; PostRank Data Services; PostRank Connect
- Number of employees: 15 (2011)
- Website: postrank.com

PostRank was a social media analytics service that used a proprietary ranking algorithm to measure "social engagement" with published content based on blog comments and links, Internet bookmarks, clicks, page views, and activities from social network services such as Twitter, Digg, Facebook and Myspace. In June 2011, PostRank was acquired by Google.

The company was formerly called AideRSS, Inc. In October 2008, AideRSS re-launched their website as postrank.com to focus the company's work on the core PostRank technology. In July 2009, the company officially changed its name to PostRank Inc.

== Services ==
The company developed and offered multiple services:

- PostRank Data Services, launched in July 2009, was a collection of APIs and reports to provide real-time and data mining Social Web data to companies to use in applications, measure marketing, and for strategic planning. The service provided a free API that was used, for example, to rank TED talks by engagement.
- PostRank Analytics, launched in September, 2009, was a service for bloggers and online publishers to track where and how their audiences are sharing and organizing their content on the Social Web and perform competitive analysis.
- PostRank Connect, launched in August, 2010, was a service for brands and public relations and marketing agencies to work with bloggers to run product campaigns and receive consulting services.

== Google Analytics ==
After acquisition, PostRank functionality was integrated into Google Analytics:

- On December 8, 2011 Google Analytics announced the Analytics Social Data Hub at LeWeb Paris.
- On March 20, 2012 Google Analytics launched social reporting functionality.
- On May 1, 2012, the PostRank services were sunset.
