= Invite Media =

Advertising bidding company owned by Google

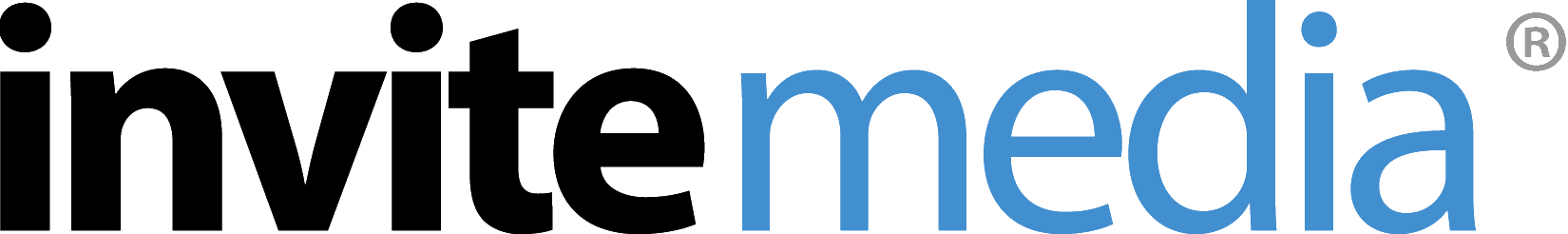
- Industry: Advertising
- Founded: April 2007
- Founder: Nathaniel Turner; Zachary Weinberg; Scott Becker; Michael Provenzano
- Defunct: 2010
- Fate: Acquired by Google
- Headquarters: Philadelphia, Pennsylvania, United States
- Website: invitemedia.com at the Wayback Machine (archived 2008-03-25)

Invite Media is a display advertising and exchange bidding company that was acquired by Google on June 3, 2010 for $81 million. Prior to Google's acquisition, Invite Media partnered up with AlmondNet, a data aggregator and intellectual property licensor.

== History ==
Invite Media was founded in April 2007, and they are the creators of Bid Manager, a "universal buying platform" for display media. Bid Manager supports many different advertisement exchanges, including DoubleClick, Yahoo, Google, AdBrite, Microsoft, and Right Media. Even though Yahoo directly competes with Google in many different areas, Yahoo has stated that they plan to continue working with demand-side platforms, including Invite Media. In an interview with AdExchanger, Google publicly stated that they would not give their own DoubleClick Ad Exchange an unfair advantage, and their technology will remain unbiased and neutral, however, they plan on making it work seamlessly with their own DoubleClick for Advertisers ad serving product. By purchasing Invite Media, Google gained a demand-side platform, which allows advertisement buyers to purchase advertisements from several different advertisement exchanges through a single interface.

Invite Media was purchased shortly after Google completed their acquisition of AdMob on May 2, 2010. Google's purchase of Invite Media has caused controversy among consumer advocacy groups, as John M. Simpson of Consumer Watchdog puts it: "The ink is hardly dry on Google's questionable AdMob acquisition, and the Internet giant is forging ahead with an insatiable appetite for more. When is enough, enough?" There was speculation about Google acquiring Invite Media almost as soon as the AdMob deal was successfully completed, because Invite Media offered "a three-year-old “demand-side platform” designed to help buyers navigate high-volume display-advertising exchanges".

On July 24, 2018, the names and logos of all DoubleClick products were updated, and DoubleClick Bid Manager is now 'Display & Video 360' (DV360).
