= Urban Engines =

- Type: Private (acquired by Google)
- Industry: Data Analytics
- Defunct: September 2016
- Fate: Acquired by Google
- Headquarters: Los Altos, California, United States
- Key people: Shiva Shivakumar (Co-Founder and CEO) Balaji Prabhakar (Co-Founder & Chief Scientist)
- Website: www.urbanengines.com

Urban Engines was a data analytics startup based in Silicon Valley. It was acquired by Google in September 2016. It used data to give insight into cities and how people move around in them. Founder and CEO Shiva Shivakumar says the company is mapping the "Internet of Moving Things," as quoted by the New York Times, which is a new way of mapping objects in motion. The company's goal is to improve mobility in cities.

Urban Engines has developed a new type of database, which maps objects in motion, called a "Space/Time Engine", and currently has deals with cities like, Washington D.C., São Paulo and Singapore as well as delivery and logistics companies.

The company also released a commuter app with "mixed-mode routing," which evaluates different modes of transportation – walking, driving, public transit, and Uber – to give users the quickest routes. The app is built on Urban Engines own proprietary mapping system.

== History and funding ==
The company was founded by Shiva Shivakumar and Balaji Prabhakar. Shiva was previously VP of Engineering and a Distinguished Entrepreneur at Google (2001-2010), who helped build AdSense, Search Appliances and Cloud Apps, and Balaji is a Stanford professor and director of the Stanford Center for Societal Networks, a prominent research initiative to make societal networks smarter, more scalable and more efficient.

Urban Engines has raised an undisclosed amount of money led by Google Ventures. Andreessen Horowitz, SV Angel, Greylock, Samsung Ventures, early Google investor Ram Shriram and Google Chairman Eric Schmidt also participated.
