= GreenBorder =

Security software company

Green Border Technologies, Inc., doing business as GreenBorder, was a security software company that specialized in using virtualization to create safe zones for online activities for Internet users. GreenBorder allows computer operators combine hardware and software to create "virtual" machines where tasks such as reading e-mail or exploring websites could be done without exposing systems to viruses or other malicious programs. Web-based programs that try to access files or computer registries are stopped from leaving what are commonly referred to as online "sandboxes" created by GreenBorder. The virtual "sandboxes" vanish at the end of each session, taking attacker assaults such as spyware, viruses, and trojans with them.

GreenBorder was founded in 2001 by Vlad Dabija (founding CEO until 2004), Úlfar Erlingsson (founding CTO until 2002), Rosen Sharma and Srinivasan Keshav (as founding board members). The initial investors were Rajeev Motwani, Sevin Rosen Funds, and Labrador Ventures joined in Series B by TPG Ventures. Bernard Harguindeguy joined the team in 2005 as the CEO and lead the turnaround before selling the company to Google.

== Google acquisition ==
GreenBorder, which is based in Mountain View, California, where Google has its headquarters, posted a message at its website announcing that it had been bought by Google. Google confirmed the purchase of GreenBorder, saying the deal was completed mid-May 2007 but the financial terms were not disclosed. GreenBorder said it is no longer taking on new customers and will service current subscribers until their contracts expire.

The terms of the deal and Google's specific plans for GreenBorder's technology were not disclosed.

The fate of the technology became apparent when Google Chrome was launched in September 2008: several former GreenBorder employees were named in a description of the new browser's sandboxing ability.
