= Bernie Stolar =

American businessman (1946–2022)

Bernard Stolar
- Born: October 9, 1946
- Died: June 22, 2022 (aged 75); Los Angeles, California, U.S.
- Education: University of California, Los Angeles
- Years active: 1970s–2022

Bernard Stolar (October 9, 1946 – June 22, 2022) was an American businessman and a prominent figure in the video game industry for many years. Among several roles in the industry, he was a founding member of Sony Computer Entertainment America, essential to the launch of the original PlayStation, and president of Sega of America, where he helped lead the development of the Sega Dreamcast home console.

== Early life and education ==
Stolar graduated from the University of California, Los Angeles where he was a member of the Pi Lambda Phi fraternity.

== Career ==
In the late 1970s, Stolar worked at The Village Voice, as an editorial director. He joined Pacific Novelty Manufacturing, a coin-op machine company in 1981, as a salesperson, before he was hired by Atari in 1985 to run their own arcade game business. Later, Stolar was moved into Atari's home console division, where, in the early 1990s, he led development of the Atari Lynx handheld console.

Stolar was the first executive vice president and a founding member of Sony Computer Entertainment America, where he was integral in both the launch and building of the original PlayStation's game catalog. At Sony, Stolar signed many game franchises including Crash Bandicoot, Ridge Racer, Oddworld, Spyro and Battle Arena Toshinden. After leaving Sony, he accepted an offer to become president and chief operating officer at Sega of America, where he led the development and launch of the Dreamcast. One of Stolar's top moves was to acquire Visual Concepts for Sega of America and create 2K Sports.

In December 1999, Stolar joined Mattel as president and helped spawn a multi-million unit selling Barbie video game series. In late 2005, Stolar became an advisor and director at Adscape Media. Stolar would later sell Adscape Media to Google for $23 million USD. Afterwards, Google would hire Stolar as their Games Evangelist. In 2009, Stolar became the chief executive officer of GetFugu. By 2010, Stolar had resigned. In 2008, young entrepreneur, Jordan Freeman, cold called Stolar, and they began working together to bring classic games to Steam and other platforms. In 2014, they decided to launch their own storefront as well, so Stolar became the chairman of ZOOM Platform and the Jordan Freeman Group.

== Death ==
Stolar died on June 22, 2022, in Los Angeles, California, at the age of 75.

Several of his friends and colleagues paid tribute to him in a Forbes memorial, including Ken Kutaragi, who said: "Bernie was the man who devoted his life and passion to the video game industry. He was also one of my best friends and we spent many moments together, even when he was away from work. His friendly smile and playful gestures are still burning on my eyelids. Thank you for all your hard work, time and dedication. Please rest in peace in heaven."

Game Informer published a similar article, which quoted others expressing their sentiments, including Vince Desi of Running with Scissors who had this to say: "Bernie was a low-key guy. He kept his ego in check. I’ve known Bernie for a long time, and I’ve never heard him raise his voice. He was a gentleman in an industry where there really aren’t many."

The New York Times published an obituary that interviewed Dean Takahashi of VentureBeat and Jordan Freeman of ZOOM Platform. Freeman had this to say: "I met Bernie when I was 16, there was absolutely no reason for him to agree to meet with me, but he took that chance. He gave everyone an opportunity. He was the paragon of a mentor to all who knew him."
