= P.T.B. (album) =

PTB

Studio album by Kingspade
- Released: April 24, 2007
- Genre: Hip-hop
- Length: 51:51
- Label: Suburban Noize
- Producer: Mike Kumagai

Kingspade chronology
Kingspade (2004)	PTB (2007)	Throw Your Spades Up (2009)

Professional ratings
Review scores
Source	Rating
AllMusic	2.5/5 stars

PTB is the second studio album by American hip-hop duo Kingspade. It was released on April 24, 2007 via Suburban Noize Records. Entirely produced by Mike Kumagai, it features a lone guest appearance from Big B. In the United States, the album debuted at number 110 on the Billboard 200, number 10 on the Independent Albums, number 2 on the Heatseekers Albums and number 14 on the Top Internet Albums charts.

The album's title stands for 'P-Town Ballers', which refers to their home city of Placentia, California.

== Track listing ==
No.	Title	Length
1.	"Intro"	0:29
2.	"Who Run This?"	3:20
3.	"Takin It Back"	3:49
4.	"Neighborhood Trends"	3:40
5.	"That's the Shit"	3:32
6.	"We Ridin"	4:06
7.	"Lookin Up" (featuring Big B)	3:46
8.	"Havin Fun"	3:23
9.	"Bring the Crowd"	4:13
10.	"Brotha Brotha"	3:58
11.	"Check Yo Bitch"	2:51
12.	"Follow the Leader"	3:59
13.	"That's How It Goes"	3:36
14.	"Dreams"	3:16
15.	"Inked Up"	3:53
Total length:		51:51

== Charts ==
Chart (2007)	Peak position
US Billboard 200 (Billboard)	110
US Independent Albums (Billboard)	10
US Heatseekers Albums (Billboard)	2
