= Orbitera =

American cloud services provider

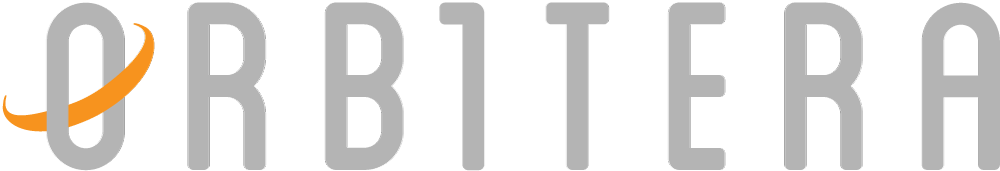
- Company type: Subsidiary
- Industry: SaaS, Cloud computing
- Founded: 2012
- Founders: Brian Singer, Firas Bushnaq
- Headquarters: Mountain View, California
- Key people: Marcin Kurc (CEO)
- Parent: Google
- Website: www.orbitera.com

Orbitera is an American cloud services provider. A subsidiary of Google, the company develops and sells an e-commerce platform that automates billing and ordering processes for cloud marketplaces.

== History ==
Orbitera was founded in 2012, by Brian Singer and Firas Bushnaq after Brian found challenges associated with selling software at tech companies where he had previously worked. The company initially raised $2 million in seed funding from Resolute Ventures and Double M Partners. By 2016, the company's platform was used by Adobe Systems, Red Hat and Avnet among others. That same year, the company was acquired by Google. As a result of the deal, the company became part of Google Cloud Platform. In 2018, Orbitera partnered with the mobile device management provider MobileIron to develop a store for cloud-based software.

== Products ==
Since its inception, Orbitera's e-commerce platform supports multi-cloud commerce. The platform handles billing processes when buying and selling cloud-based services, automates the building of online marketplaces and bundled cloud services, and enables product trials through test drives. The company's 2018 partnership with MobileIron will enable clients to sell groups of services by customer segment, allow for customized branding, offer streamlined billing, and support data, voice, and third-party cloud services.
