= National Train Enquiry System =

Real-time railway data system in India

- राष्ट्रीय रेल पूछताछ प्रणाली

Agency overview
- Formed: 1990s (approx)
- Headquarters: New Delhi, India
- Parent agency: Ministry of Railways, Government of India
- Website: enquiry.indianrail.gov.in

National Train Enquiry System (NTES) is a comprehensive online platform and mobile application developed by the Centre for Railway Information Systems (CRIS) for Indian Railways. It serves as a primary official source for real-time information regarding train running status, schedules, and other related inquiries across the Indian railway network.

== History ==
NTES was developed by the Centre for Railway Information Systems (CRIS), the IT arm of Indian Railways, to centralise and digitise train information. Prior to its introduction, passengers primarily relied on manual inquiries at railway stations or through outdated train timetables. The system aimed to provide a more accessible and efficient way for the public to obtain train-related data.

== Functionality and features ==
NTES provides a range of services to facilitate railway travel and information access:

=== Live train running status ===
This core feature allows users to track the current status of registered train on the Indian Railways network. It provides information on the train's last reported location, expected arrival and departure times at upcoming stations, and any delays incurred. The system aggregates data from various operational points across the railway network.

=== Train schedule ===
Users can access the detailed schedule of any train, including its route, halts, arrival and departure times at each station, and the distance covered between stops. This functionality supports journey planning and provides comprehensive timetable information.

=== Trains between stations ===
This feature enables passengers to find all trains operating between any two specified railway stations. The results include train numbers, names, types, and their respective schedules for the selected route.

=== Train arrival/departure at station ===
NTES provides real-time updates on train arrivals and departures at specific stations. This is particularly useful for passengers waiting at stations or those receiving travelers.

== Accessibility and platforms ==
NTES information is accessible through multiple platforms:

- Website: The primary interface is the official NTES website, providing detailed information and search functionalities.
- Mobile Application: Dedicated mobile applications for Android and iOS devices offer on-the-go access to train information.
- SMS and IVRS: Limited information can also be accessed through SMS services and Interactive Voice Response Systems (IVRS).

== Technology ==
NTES operates on a centralised database system managed by CRIS. It collects data from various operational systems across the Indian Railways network, including train control systems, station management systems, and ticketing systems. The data is processed and disseminated through its web and mobile interfaces. The system relies on a robust backend infrastructure to manage a high volume of enquiries.

RailRadar utilises NTES data to provide live train status and other services.
