= HP RTR =

HP Reliable Transaction Router (RTR) is a transactional middleware for computer software, marketed by Hewlett Packard. RTR is used to integrate with applications that require reliable transaction services.

== Description ==
The RTR software package manages the messages sent between client-server to provide node and network fail-over for increased reliability, transactional integrity, and interoperability between dissimilar systems.

The RTR software has three logical entities: front-end (FE), back-end (BE), and transaction-router(TR). The router is a software component that manages fail-over capabilities and connections to the back-end. The client applications running on the front end, combined with the Router and Server applications running on the back end, interact to provide transaction integrity and reliability. The three logical entities can exist on the same node but are usually deployed on different nodes to achieve modularity, scalability, and high availability.

The client application interacts with the front-end which forwards the messages to the router, the router in turn routes the message to the intended back-end where the appropriate Server application is available for processing the message. The RTR routing capability partitions data across multiple servers and nodes for increased performance. The partition determines how messages are routed between the client and the servers within an application. The message exchange happens between the client and the server. Transactions start at the client and involve messages that can go to several servers. Such a method of messaging is used when there are multiple recipients for a message, or unsolicited messages need to be sent. RTR is designed to mitigate failures in distributed application environments, including complete site, node, network link, and software process failures. RTR also provides high availability by using redundant resources in the distributed environment.

RTR provides a Web Interface and a Command-Line Interface(CLI) for managing the RTR environment. When RTR and its components are running along with the applications, then Client Application, Server Application, and RTR services will be active.

User and Management Applications can be written using RTR APIs. The C, C++, Java, and .Net variants of APIs are available for creating applications to use RTR.

== History ==
RTR was first conceived in Zurich, Switzerland, by Dr. Paul Shrager in early 1988 and developed by a small team of four engineers working for DEC (Digital Equipment Corporation). The initial release was written in a mix of Macro, Bliss, Pascal, and SDL on top of DECnet and VMS. Later, it was reimplemented in C on top of a TCP/IP stack and an OS-agnostic infrastructure that allowed it to be deployed on multiple operating systems, including various flavors of Unix/Linux, VMS, and Windows. A Java and C++ veneer was added in the mid-90s to support an RPC-style veneer on top of the "services" oriented interface.

== Special Characteristics ==
RTR features include:

- Concurrent servers (a service could be offered by multiple entities, either as multiple threads within the same process or as independent processes)
- Standby servers (a set of services that is capable of offering the services, if required, but not currently being asked to do so)
- Shadow servers (a set of services currently processing an identical set of requests as the primary servers)

Additionally, RTR maintains data equivalence across the repositories behind the primary and shadow servers by enforcing a dependency relationship among the set of concurrent transactions being shadowed, allowing it to process multiple concurrent transactions.

== Usage ==
RTR is primarily used by banks, stock exchanges, and railway passenger reservation systems.

RTR was available on HP-UX, Linux, Windows and OpenVMS in 2010.
