= Group buying =

Products and services offered at a volume discount

Group buying, also known as collective buying, offers products and services at significantly reduced prices on the condition that a minimum number of buyers would make the purchase. Origins of group buying can be traced to China, where it is known as Tuán Gòu (Chinese: 团购), or team buying.

In recent times, group buying websites such as Pinduoduo in China have emerged in the online shopping business. Typically, these websites feature a "deal of the day", with the deal kicking in when a set number of people agree to buy the product or service. Buyers then print off a voucher to claim their discount at the retailer. Many of the group-buying sites work by negotiating deals with local merchants and promising to deliver a higher foot count in exchange for better prices.

== History ==
In 2000, with financial backing from Microsoft, co-founder Paul Allen started an e-commerce start-up called Mercata with a business plan dubbed "We Commerce". The website offered high-end electronic deals to shoppers online. Individual web shoppers would sign up en-masse to buy the same product and the price of the product would fall as more people signed up to buy it. However, the website was shut down in 2001 as it could not compete with websites like Amazon.com.

Recently, group buying has been taken online in numerous forms, although group buys prior to 2009 usually referred to the grouping of industrial products for the wholesale market (especially in China). Modern day online group buys are a variation of the tuángòu buying that occurs in China. Under tuángòu, an item must be bought in a minimum quantity or dollar amount, otherwise the seller will not allow the purchase. Since individuals typically do not need multiples of one item or do not have the resources to buy in bulk, group buys allow people to invite others to purchase in bulk jointly. These group buys, often result in better prices for individual buyers or ensure that a scarce or obscure item is available for sale. Group buys were, in the past, often organized by like-minded online shoppers through Internet forums. Now these shoppers have also started to leverage the group buying model for purposes of buying other consumer durables. Group buying sites are back in demand as small businesses look for ways to promote their products to budget-conscious consumers in a weak global economy. Group buying is also used for purchasing real estate properties. Real Estate Group Buying is very popular in India where websites like Group Bookings offers group deals on various properties.

In China, group buys usually happened when dealing with industrial items such as single-board computers. China had over 1,215 group-buying sites at the end of August 2010 compared with only 100 in March of the same year. English-language group-buying platforms are also becoming popular. Online group buying gained prominence in other parts of Asia during 2010 with new websites in Taiwan, Singapore, Hong Kong, Thailand, Malaysia and the Philippines.

Google launched their own daily deals site in 2011 called "Google Offers" after its $6 billion acquisition offer to Groupon was rejected. Google Offers functions much like Groupon as well as its competitor LivingSocial. Users receive daily emails with local deals, which carry some preset time limit. When the deal reaches the minimum number of customers, all the users will receive the deal. The business model will remain the same. Facebook's 'Facebook deals' application was launched in five European countries in January 2011. The application works on a similar group buying model.

== Business model ==
If subscribers to a discount website are tempted by a discount offer, they enter their payment details online and wait. When a minimum number of people sign up for the same offer, the deal is confirmed and a voucher is sent to their inboxes. Shops, restaurants and other retailers that partner with these discount websites have to take hefty price cuts. But it means they have instant access to a whole new group of customers. The online group buying market is fragmented among hundreds of smaller players worldwide. The model has little barriers to entry and has gained attention from shoppers and businesses alike globally... According to SmartMoney, by August 2010, there were more than 500 group-buying sites worldwide, including local sites that cater only to a single city in some instances.

== Origins of tuangou ==
Tuangou, which translates as team buying or group buying (also known as store mobbing), is a recently developed shopping strategy originating in the China. Several people - sometimes friends, but possibly strangers connected over the internet - agree to approach a vendor of a specific product in order to achieve collective bargaining (haggling) with the proprietor in order to get discounts. The entire group agrees to purchase the same item. The shoppers benefit by paying less, and the business benefits by selling multiple items at once.

The tuángòu phenomenon has been most successful in China, where buyers have leveraged the power of group buying, which has led to English language media, such as msn.com, profiling the tuángòu buying process. The popularity of the strategy in China is often attributed to the Chinese tradition of bargaining for the purchase of goods of all types. Tuángòu buying also ameliorates a traditional distrust of goods purchased from unknown sellers as individual members of the buying group can vouch for a particular seller's quality to the rest of the group.

== See also ==
- Crowdfunding
- Economy of scale
- Group purchasing organization
