= FeedBurner =

Email notification system for blogs, made by Google

Feedburner, Inc.
- Company type: Subsidiary
- Website type: Web feed management
- Parent: Google
- Website: feedburner.google.com
- Launched: February 29, 2004; 22 years ago
- Current status: Active

Feedburner, Inc. is a web feed management service primarily for monetizing RSS feeds, primarily by inserting targeted advertisements into them. It was founded in 2004 and acquired by Google in 2007.

== Services ==
Services provided to publishers include traffic analysis and an optional advertising system. Though it initially was not clear whether advertising would be well-suited to the RSS format, authors now choose to include advertising in two-thirds of FeedBurner's feeds. Users can find out how many people have subscribed to their feeds and with what service/program they subscribed.

Feedburner replaces an ordinary RSS feed by a modified feed; the original feed becomes a private feed that only Feedburner can access. Apart from advertising, published feeds are modified in several ways, including automatic links to Digg and del.icio.us, and "splicing" information from multiple feeds. FeedBurner originally offered application programming interfaces (APIs) to allow other software to interact with it, but as of October 2012 no longer does. As of August 4, 2008 (the last time statistics were released), FeedBurner hosted 1,993,406 feeds for 1,125,264 publishers, including 249,728 podcast and videocast feeds.

== History ==
FeedBurner was founded in 2004 by Dick Costolo, Eric Lunt, Steve Olechowski, and Matt Shobe. The four founders were consultants together at Andersen Consulting (now Accenture).

On June 3, 2007, FeedBurner was acquired by Google for a rumored price of $100 million. One month later, two of their popular "Pro" services (MyBrand and TotalStats) were made free to all users.

On May 26, 2011, Google announced that the FeedBurner APIs were deprecated. Google shut down the APIs on October 20, 2012.

Google terminated AdSense for Feeds on October 2, 2012 and shut it down on December 3, 2012.

On April 14, 2021, Google announced they would migrate FeedBurner to new infrastructure but remove "non-core" functionality including email subscriptions, browser-friendly viewing, and password-protection. This was originally scheduled for July 2021 but did not occur until July 2022.
