= Google Offers =

Discount service provided by Google

- Screenshot of Google Offers beta
- Website type: Electronic commerce deal-of-the-day
- Available in: English and others
- Owner: Google
- Website: www.google.com/offers
- Commercial: Yes
- Registration: None
- Launched: May 26, 2011
- Current status: Offline

Google Offers was a service offering discounts and coupons. Initially, it was a deal-of-the-day website similar to Groupon, but it later changed focus. Rather than a small number of prepaid offers, it instead offered many smaller discounts. It is additionally integrated with both Google Maps and Google Wallet for mobile offers. In 2014, Google announced it would be shutting the service down.

== History ==
In 2011, Google began to drop hints of entering the Offers market. Nate Tyler, a Google spokesman, stated that the company is "communicating with small businesses to enlist their support and participation in a test of a prepaid offers/vouchers program. This initiative is part of an ongoing effort at Google to make new products … that connect businesses with customers in new ways." Users receive an e-mail with a local deal of the day. They then have the opportunity to buy that deal within a specific time limit (usually 24 hours). Unlike Groupon, an offer on Google Offers is valid regardless of how many people take it. Google Offers is powered by Google Checkout and integrates with Google Wallet. It will also include Facebook, Twitter, Google Reader, Google Buzz and e-mail sharing options. Google Offers development information was leaked after a failed attempt by Google to buy Groupon for US$6 billion in December 2010.

On April 21, 2011, via Google Places Facebook page, it was announced that "Offers BETA is coming", and provided a link to a signup page listing a few select cities, with the first beta city being Portland, Oregon.

On May 26, 2011, the service was officially launched; the first offer was on June 1, for Floyd's Coffee Shop in Portland. During its first month, the most popular deal was $20 worth of Powell's Books merchandise for $10: "5,000 Powell’s vouchers sold out in a matter of hours." That deal's price turned out to be Google Offers' median offer price for the month.

On July 12, 2011, service was expanded to New York and the San Francisco Bay Area.

On July 4, 2012, Google Offers Chrome extension was launched. This extension has been "retired".

On March 6, 2013, offer extensions in AdWords were launched, allowing businesses to distribute promotions through their AdWords campaigns. These offers are discoverable when a user searches for a business, brand, product, or service. They save the offer to their Google Account from the Search ad and then redeem in-store or online.

In March 2014, Google announced that it would be shutting the service down.

== See also ==
- Amazon Local
- Groupon
- LivingSocial
