= Woot =

Company

Woot, Inc.

- Screenshot
- Website type: Subsidiary
- Founded: 2004; 22 years ago
- Headquarters: Carrollton, TX
- Key people: Matt Rutledge (Founder and former CEO)
- Industry: Retail
- Products: Electronics, Household Goods, etc.
- Revenue: US$164 million (2008) ▲39.7% from 2007
- Employees: 140
- Parent: Amazon
- Website: woot.com

Woot (originally W00t) is an American Internet retailer based in the Dallas suburb of Carrollton, Texas. Founded by electronics wholesaler Matt Rutledge, it debuted on July 12, 2004. Woot's main website originally offered only one discounted product each day, often a piece of computer hardware or an electronic gadget. Other Woot sites offer daily deals for T-shirts, wine, children's items, and household goods. Two other sites offer various items. On June 30, 2010, Woot announced an agreement to be acquired by Amazon.

== Sales model ==
Woot's original tagline was "One Day, One Deal" and is now "Don't work to find deals. Let the deals find you". Originally, Woot offered one product per day until its stock of that item was sold out, or until the product was replaced at midnight Central Time with the next offering. If a product sold out during its run, the next item would not appear until midnight, except during Woot-Off promotions. Woot was a forerunner in the one-deal-a-day business model. Customers could buy up to three of the sale item, although the site occasionally limited product quantity to one per customer.

Products are never announced beforehand. This sales model means that defective products cannot be replaced, only refunded. The company also does not provide customer support for the products it sells; in case of issues, customers are advised to seek support either from the manufacturer or through the online user community on the Woot forums.

Following its acquisition by Amazon, Woot's business model was heavily modified to sell a selection of products across different categories, moving away from its foundational business to better complement its Amazon partnership. The selection within a category varies and if a product sells out early enough in the day, a new product is generally offered for sale in its place.

Woot sometimes sells refurbished items. In 2011, sales of 6,200 refurbished Motorola Xooms included a small number (about 100) that were not refurbished properly and may have been sold with data from the devices' previous owners.

== Special events ==
The site occasionally deviates from the one-product-per-day model for a "Woot-Off". A Woot-Off lasts for an unannounced length, usually 24–72 hours. During a Woot-Off, products usually sell out quickly, and when one product sells out, it is replaced within a minute or two by a new product. A percentage bar shows how much stock of the current product remains. However, Woot never gives the exact quantity available until after the item has sold out.

Beginning with the "gamma" launch of the Neuros MPEG 4 Recorder on February 9, 2005, Woot has occasionally partnered with another company to launch a new product with a one-day exclusive Woot sale.

Starting in August 2004, Woot began occasionally offering a blind grab bag officially called "Random Crap", in lieu of typical product sales. While today its accompanying picture of a paper lunch bag with a question mark has kept its unofficial name "Bag of Crap", (BOC) it was originally dubbed "Bag of Crap" during the early years of the site when a physical bag of some kind (notebook, iomega zipper bags, etc.) was sold with the 1–3 "craps" and was part of what you were buying. Today, the BOC contains at least three "crappy" items and one bag whose value and quality are not guaranteed, but sometimes expensive items are included. The BOC has been known to sell out in a matter of hours. During the January 25, 2011 selling, the website received a record 3.1 million requests, and the product was sold out within eight seconds.

During April Fool's Day 2008, Woot staged a Woot-Off offering the same product repeatedly, except for a few brief periods when Woot sold Bags of Crap instead. Three years later on April Fools' Day, Woot staged a "Bag of Crap" flash game, which users were instructed to play in order to win the privilege of buying Bags of Crap.

On April 1, 2011, eight thousand Bags of Crap were sold. Later in the day, once the Bag of Crap selling period was over, a Woot admin said that there were over seven million attempts to get the Bags of Crap.

Debuting on March 10, 2010, Woot ran limited one-hour versions of the Woot-Off called Happy Hour. These events were promoted solely via Twitter, and did not appear on woot.com's front page. Happy Hour didn't quite work out and was put on an indefinite hold by August 2011.

== Acquisition ==
On June 30, 2010, Woot was sold to Amazon for a reported sum of $110 million. The CEO, Matt Rutledge, sent an E-mail to employees stressing that Woot would continue to operate as per usual. However, in June 2014, he crowdsourced a new website called Meh to become the successor of Woot, citing dissatisfaction with changes made by Amazon.

== Related sites ==
Woot has created several spin-off sites, some following a similar business model as the main site, others providing other retail-related services. These include:

- Wine.woot 2006–2017
- Shirt.woot begun 2007
- Sellout.woot 2007
- Kids.woot 2009–2017
- Deals.woot closed 2016
- Home.woot 2011–present
- Sport.woot 2012–present
- Electronics.woot launched 2012 as Tech.woot, renamed Electronics.woot in 2014
- Tools.woot 2013–present
- Accessories.woot 2013–2017
- Computers.woot 2014–present

== Bibliography ==
- Time magazine's "50 Coolest Websites 2005"
- PC Magazine site review
- Motley Fool article
- New York Times article
- National Public Radio All Things Considered interview with Woot writer Jason Toon and developer Luke Duff (Streaming Audio)
