= Panoramio =

2005–2016 geotagging photo sharing service owned by Google

- Panoramio homepage
- Website type: Photo sharing
- Available in: Multilingual
- Dissolved: November 4, 2016; 9 years ago
- Owner: Google
- Creators: Joaquín Cuenca Abela (co-founder); Eduardo Manchón (co-founder); Jose Florido (co-founder)
- Website: www.panoramio.com
- Commercial: Yes
- Registration: Free
- Users: 4.1 million
- Launched: October 3, 2005; 20 years ago
- Current status: Defunct

Panoramio was a geo-located tagging, photo sharing mashup active between 2005 and 2016. Photos uploaded to the site were accessible as a layer in Google Earth and Google Maps. The site's goal was to allow Google Earth users to learn more about a given area by viewing the photos that other users had taken at that location. Panoramio was acquired by Google in 2007. In 2009 the website was among the 1000 most popular websites worldwide.

Panoramio was launched in 2005, and closed on November 4, 2016, although the layer in Google Earth was available until January 2018. Image source URLs are still available.

After the acquisition of Panoramio by Google, the headquarters were located in Zurich, in the office building of Google Switzerland, but subsequently were moved to Mountain View, California, US.

== History ==
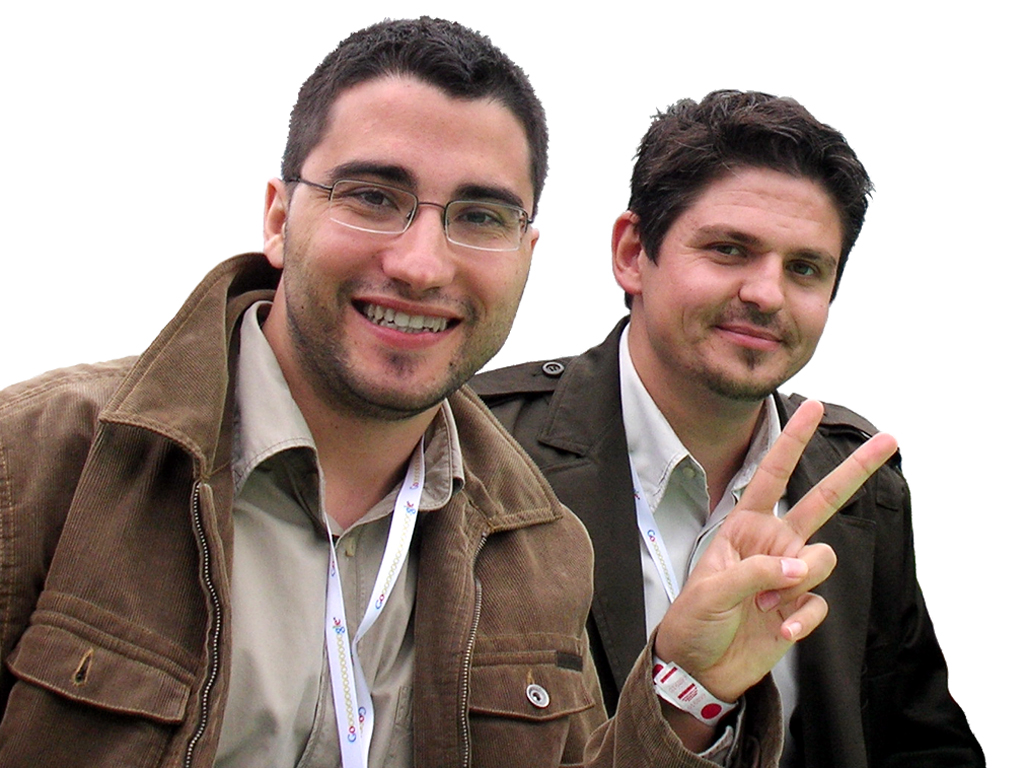
Joaquín Cuenca and Eduardo Manchón, the creators of Panoramio

Panoramio was started in the summer of 2005 by Spanish entrepreneurs Joaquín Cuenca Abela and Eduardo Manchón Aguilar. It was officially launched on October 3, 2005, and by March 19, 2007, it had archived over 1 million user submitted photographs. Three months later, on June 27, 2007, the number of photos reached two million. After a further four months, on October 25, 2007, the number of archived photos reached five million.

In October 2006 Google began approaches to acquire the company, but they were rebuffed. However, on May 30, 2007, Google announced plans to acquire the website; this was completed in July 2007.

Manchón left the company in January 2010 to focus on a new project. He was replaced by Gerard Sanz Viñas. Cuenca left the company in May 2010.

In May 2015 the number of uploaded photos (including deleted objects) exceeded 120 million. By October 8, 2016, 94,370,531 photos had been uploaded by 4,159,004 users, resulting in a total of 75,640,891,592 image views.

== Further developments ==
On September 16, 2014, Google announced that it intended to close Panoramio and migrate it to Google Maps Views. During the migration, features such as comments, favorite photographers and groups would disappear.

On September 23, 2014, Panoramio's founders launched a petition entitled "Google: Keep The Panoramio Community Alive", requesting that Google refrain from closing Panoramio. It received 10,512 supporters. On June 2, 2015, Google announced that it would continue to operate Panoramio until a better solution could be developed. The announcement, by Google's James Therrien, stated:

Among Google's geo-imagery efforts, we strive to balance what makes sense for you, the pro or enthusiast photographer, with the needs of consumers. Achieving this balance can be a challenge, especially when publishing tools are managed under separate products, such as Panoramio, Views, Google+ and Google Maps. So today, after listening to community feedback about the future of the platform, we're pleased to let you know that there won't be any immediate changes to Panoramio. Instead of aligning the community with Views, we've gone back to the drawing board to work on a more integrated solution that supports you and your content directly within Google Maps. We'll be taking the necessary time to get this right as we build a solution that strives to meet the majority of your needs. Thanks for your input, and for your patience in the year ahead.

On January 30, 2016, another petition was launched by Stuart Smith, a Panoramio user from Australia, to request Google to maintain the site. It received over 1,500 supporters. Despite the continuing popularity of the site and both petitions, Google announced on October 5, 2016, that they had decided to close Panoramio on November 4, 2016. Users were able to access their photos in Panoramio for a year, but were unable to add new photos, likes, or comments.

== Closure ==
On November 4, 2016, Google removed all user facilities from the site apart from the ability to delete photos, connect/disconnect with Google+, and delete an account. Google said it left uploaded images on display for 12 months before Panoramio was completely retired.

Most photos remain stored in the Wayback Machine. About 2.3 million images published under a Creative Commons license have been transferred to the Wikimedia Commons project by Panoramio Upload Bot.

== Organization ==
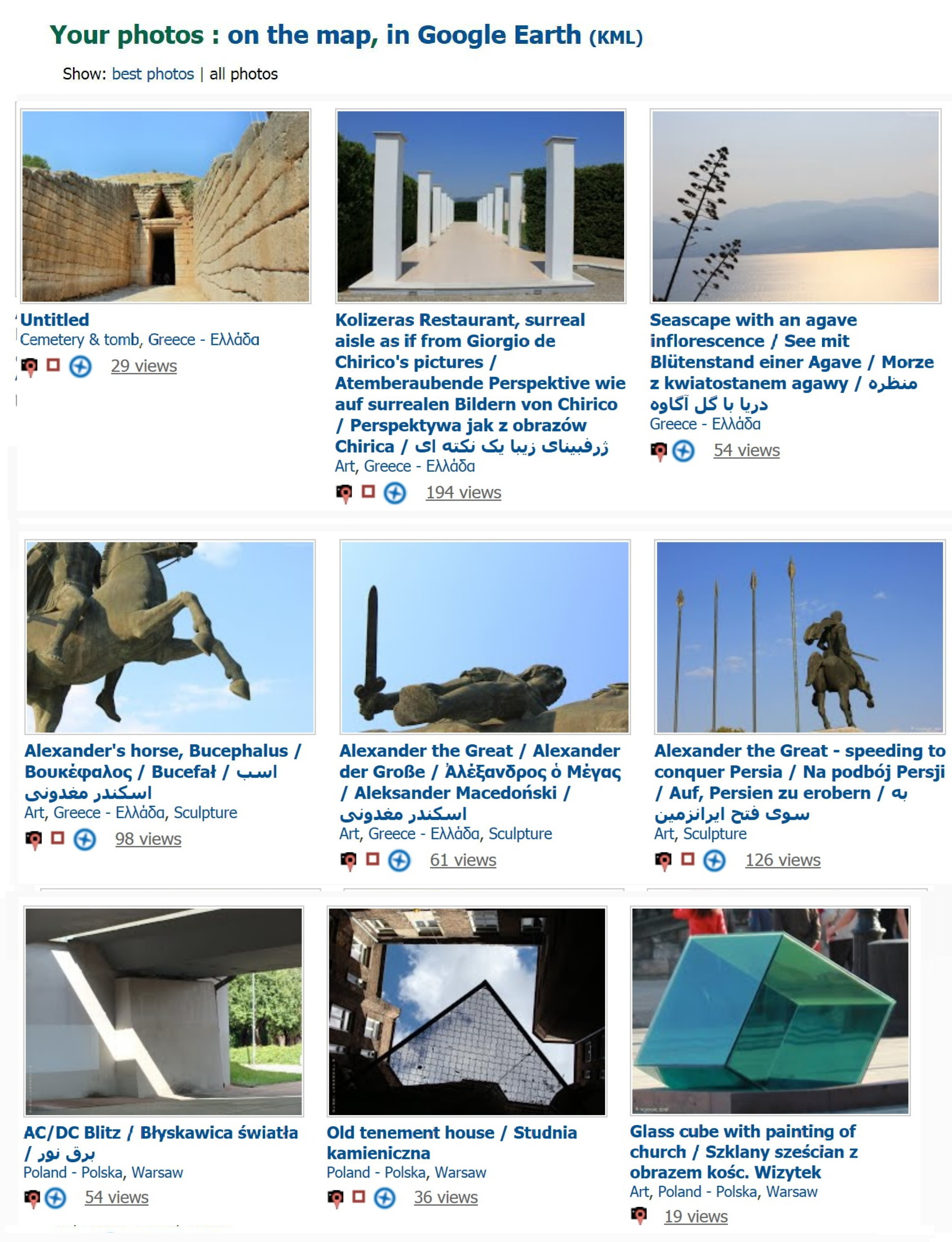
Sample Panoramio page (of user 656563) exemplifying some of the mashup's options

Panoramio asked users to organize images using tags (a form of metadata), which allow searchers to find images concerning a certain topic such as place name or subject matter. Panoramio was also an early website to implement tag clouds, which provided access to images tagged with the most popular keywords. The website also hosted a list of world-famous sites. As of February 2012, 1 million photos were uploaded to the site in about 20 days.

Images that had (or were perceived to have had) as their central subject people, machines, vehicles or anything within the interiors of structures, or depict public events such as fairs or concerts, were excluded from the Google Earth layer, as were any potentially controversial images. No waivers were granted even if the images were historical or otherwise vintage in nature, since copyright had to be held by the uploader. Images judged to be too creative or artistic in concept, such as Photoshop constructions, were also excluded from Google Earth regardless of other requirements met. However a pervasive problem was thousands of misplaced photos, typically manifested by cities and towns seemingly located in the oceans, which required action on the part of the photographer before anything could be done. Users could create and join Google Groups. Photos could then be added to a group. This feature was removed as part of the winding down of the site.

== Others ==
Panoramio had an official iPhone app, which was deprecated in June 2012. Third party developers released a Windows Phone 7 version of Panoramio that allowed users to browse through the various images posted to www.panoramio.com.

In response to the announcement that Panoramio would shut down, the photo-sharing service Mapillary set up a process for transferring one's Panoramio pictures to their service.

Data published in Panoramio has been used by scientists, local and governmental authorities as a proxy for the evaluation of aesthetic values, the appreciation of different landscape types and identifying frequently photographed locations.

== See also ==
- Landscape photography
