= Deal-of-the-day =

E-commerce business website

Deal-of-the-day (also called daily deal or flash sales or one deal a day) is an e-commerce business model in which a website offers a single product for sale for a period of 24 to 36 hours. Potential customers register as members of the deal-a-day websites and receive online offers and invitations by email or social networks. By 2011, deal-of-the-day sites were continuing to grow in popularity, although concerns had arisen over the longevity of the concept and the financial viability of one-day deals for small businesses. However, as of 2026, most of these sites have either been bought out by larger companies, or have gone out of business.

== History ==
The deal-of-the-day concept gained popularity with the launching of Woot.com in July 2004, although Woot itself was a modified version of earlier dot-com bubble sites such as uBid. By late 2006, the deal-of-the-day industry had greatly expanded to over 100 deal-a-day sites. In November 2008, Groupon entered the market and became the second fastest online company to reach a billion-dollar valuation.

Other online businesses, including Facebook, and Google tested their own daily deal sites, withdrawing them after they proved unsuccessful. However, the rise of social networks, such as Facebook and Myspace, has accelerated the growth of daily deals sites, allowing popular deals to spread virally.

== Business model overview ==
The deal-of-the-day business model allows retailers to market discounted services or products directly to the customers of a deal company, which receives a portion of the retailer's profit. This allows retailers to build brand loyalty and quickly sell surplus inventory.

The majority of deal-of-the-day sites work directly with local businesses and online retailers to develop deals that are significantly discounted compared to recommended retail prices. Using a group buying formula, a minimum and maximum number of deals are made available. Typically, deal-of-the-day sites segment merchandise by specific designer sales. Deals are typically only offered for 24 hours, although daily deal websites are increasingly offering alternative, longer deal-buying periods to increase sales and allow multiple deals to run in a single location concurrently.

Descriptions of the deals are often emailed to customers when the deal goes live, sometimes with creative or humorous descriptions. The practice of sending these emails has been criticized by email marketing professionals and users. However, evidence suggests that this aggressive strategy is effective at generating sales. Some sites allow members to receive an email either daily or weekly or to be notified of all current offers. Customers purchase the deal on the deal-of-the-day website rather than directly from the retailer. The websites then retain the customer data rather than the retailer.

Once the minimum number of deals have been sold, customers' credit cards are charged, and the deal is delivered as an electronic voucher redeemable at the retailer or service provider's location. The promotional value of the vouchers purchased from deal-of-the-day websites typically expire after a certain period but maintain the original value paid.

Common products and services sold through deal-of-the-day websites include apparel, restaurants and bars, salons and spas, special events, health and fitness products, and travel packages.

Several morning shows and daytime talk shows have adopted the deal-of-the-day format to sell various items, with ABC's Good Morning America featuring two versions of the concept: The Right Stuff, which is often timed with an online retail sale, and GMA contributor Tory Johnson's own vertical integration segment, Deals & Steals, along with The View's View Your Deal. CBS features CBS Deals across various programs, including CBS Mornings and The Talk, while NBC's Today features several of its own segments. In syndication and on local morning news shows, various companies, such as Morning Save, provide their own featured segments.

== Marketing ==
Most businesses which run contracts with daily deal websites consider doing so as a marketing activity rather than a direct means of generating profit. Between the deep discount offered as part of the deal and the payout to the deal-of-the-day site, the businesses may net little or no profit (effectively making the deals loss leaders). There is evidence that these businesses gain significant increases in overall sales due to the amount of exposure gained from running a one-day deal. Many customers who purchase daily deals are "price-sensitive deal-seekers" who are unlikely to return to the business in the future without similar discounts. However, studies have shown that for small businesses and start-ups, daily deals can result in a substantial 30% increase in profits. A survey of businesses who ran daily deals in the past year revealed that more than half (55.5%) profited on their daily deal promotion, whereas just over a quarter (26.6%) lost money. The remainder (17.9%) broke even. Beyond mere exposure, these businesses hope to capitalize on the long-term value of new repeat customers. Thus deal-of-the-day sites also function as marketing platforms.

A study of small businesses revealed that on average, daily deal spending is the single largest expenditure in a company's marketing budget, at 23.5%, which translates to average annual spending on daily deal programs of $46,530. Lesser expenditures include e-mail promotions (16.1% or $31,878) and online search advertising through programs such as Google AdWords (14.7% or $29,106).

== Affiliates ==
Most daily deal websites have an affiliate marketing program, allowing third-party websites to be paid for referring visitors and increasing the presence of deal-of-the-day sites. These websites display syndicated offers from a number of deal sites based on location and the categories of deals a user is interested in receiving. These aggregators earn a percentage of sales made by deal sites through their affiliate programs.

== Industry outlook ==
Whereas 2010 was a year of rapid growth for the industry, daily deal sites began to slide in 2011 and 2012, and have fallen further since. There was a surge in the private shopping club sector with niche products and offerings such as luxury home ware and high-end food gaining in popularity. This has continued to this day, with shopping clubs, both online and physical, rising in popularity.

The increase in venture capital injections and startup launches demonstrates the continued growth of the industry. Examples of such activity include the recent launches of Facebook, Amazon, Google, and AT&T's daily deal sites. Groupon filed for its IPO in June 2011 and went public in November of that year.

Despite positive growth figures, some studies suggest there is a structural weakness to the industry that will have to be addressed. Such shortcomings exist on both the consumer and merchant sides of the industry. For example, deal users very rarely return for a full price purchase, and a large percentage of businesses indicate their disinterest in further deals in the future. Thus the industry may need to settle for lower shares of revenues from businesses compared to their current levels (20-50%), which are not sustainable. It is unclear whether industry diversification, increasing competition, and larger revenue shares for merchants will disrupt the industry leaders or cannibalize the industry as a whole.

== See also ==
- CashCashPinoy
