= S32 =

S32 may refer to:

== Aviation ==
- Blériot-SPAD S.32, a French racing biplane
- Cooperstown Municipal Airport, in North Dakota, United States
- Letov Š-32, a Czechoslovak airliner
- Short S.32, a British transport aircraft
- Sikorsky S-32, an American sesquipane
- Sukhoi S-32, a prototype Russian fighter aircraft

== Naval vessels ==
- ARA San Luis (S-32), a submarine of the Argentine Navy
- Brazilian submarine Timbira (S-32)
- SMS S32 (1886), a torpedo boat of the Imperial German Navy sunk 1910
- SMS S32 (1914), a torpedo boat of the Imperial German Navy scuttled 1919
- Spanish submarine Isaac Peral (S32)
- USS S-32 (SS-137), a submarine of the United States Navy

== Rail and transit ==
- Futamata Station (Hokkaido), in Oshamambe, Hokkaido, Japan
- S32, a line of the Karlsruhe Stadtbahn, in Germany

== Roads ==
- Jingping Expressway, in Beijing, China
- S32 Xuanhua–Datong Expressway, between Hebei and Shanxi, China
- Shanghai–Jiaxing–Huzhou Expressway, Shanghai, China
- Suzhou–Dengfeng Expressway, Henan, China
- County Route S32 (California), United States
- County Route S32 (Bergen County, New Jersey), United States

== Other uses ==
- South32, an Australian mining and metals company (stock ticker)
- Sulfur-32, an isotope of sulfur
- S32, a postcode district in the Hope Valley, Derbyshire, England
- S32, the current ENIGMA designation for a Russian radio station nicknamed The Squeaky Wheel
- S32 (company) (formerly Section 32), a California-based venture fund founded by Google Ventures founder, Bill Maris.
