= Love Master (disambiguation) =

Love Master is a pseudonym of American comedian Craig Shoemaker.

Love Master may also refer to:

- The Lovemaster (1997 film), directed by Michael Goldberg, starring Craig Shoemaker
- The Love Master (1927 film), directed by Laurence Trimble
