= Andrew Conrad =

American geneticist (born 1964)

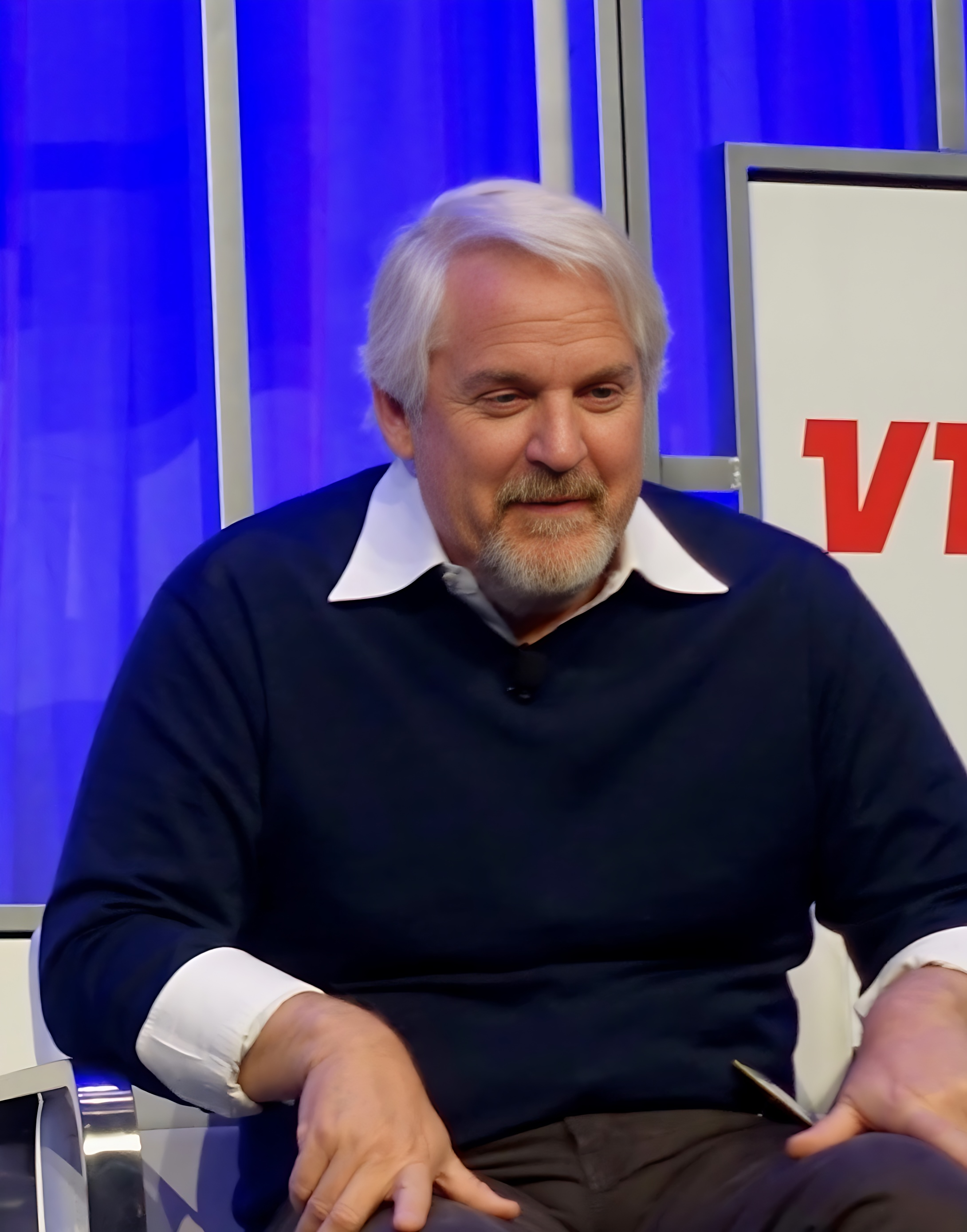
- Conrad in 2019
- Born: 1964 (age 61–62); United States
- Education: University of California, Los Angeles
- Spouses: Courtney Thorne-Smith (m. 2000; div. 2001): Haylynn Cohen
- Scientific career
- Fields: Genetics
- Workplaces: North Carolina Research Campus

Andrew J. Conrad is an American geneticist who was a co-founder at Verily, a life sciences division of Alphabet Inc. As its chief executive officer, Conrad has recruited a multidisciplinary team of chemists, doctors, engineers, behavioral scientists and data scientists to research health and disease.

== Early life ==
Conrad grew up in Malibu, California and enjoyed surfing there.

== Education ==
Conrad graduated with a B.S. in neurobiology and a Ph.D. in cell biology from the University of California, Los Angeles (UCLA) in the late 1980s.

== Career ==
In 1991, Conrad co-founded the National Genetics Institute (NGI) along with Mike Aicher. He served as its chief scientist and helped grow it into one of the largest genetics laboratories in the world. With the money earned from the sale of NGI, Conrad built a vacation home on the Lānaʻi island of Hawaii.

At an art auction in Lānaʻi, Conrad met David H. Murdock, chairman and owner of Dole Food Company, and also owner of Lānaʻi island. Murdock came to trust Conrad and eventually gave him board membership on companies he controlled: Castle & Cooke, Dole Food Company and NovaRx. Conrad invested his money with Murdock and his son, Justin.

In 2005, Conrad helped set up the North Carolina Research Campus (NCRC), a life sciences research center in Kannapolis, North Carolina. Murdock donated $700 million to NCRC as its founder. As its chief scientific advisor, Conrad attracted prominent scientists and companies to NCRC to develop products focused on agriculture, food, nutrition, and health.

In November 2006, Conrad founded the California Health and Longevity Institute inside the Four Seasons Westlake Village, California in partnership with Murdock and Wellpoint.

In March 2013, Conrad joined the life sciences unit of Google X after 22 years at NGI.

In June 2013, Murdock started the process to take the Dole Food Company private and appointed Conrad at the head of a four-person special committee of independent directors to approve a deal. Murdock initially offered $12 a share in cash, a price that the committee found too low. Murdock ultimately closed the deal at $13.50 but shareholders sued anyway. In 2015 they were awarded $148 million in damages while Conrad was found to have acted with integrity, and was not held liable.

In August 2015, the life sciences unit of Google X was spun out as its own company under the Alphabet Inc. with Conrad as its CEO. In December 2015, the company changed its name from Google Life Sciences to Verily.

In January 2023, Stephen Gillett became the new CEO of Verily, while Conrad shifted roles to become the executive chairman amid a corporate restructuring.

In February 2024, Conrad joined S32, a venture capital firm founded by Bill Maris, as a General Partner. Conrad, a notable figure in the fields of technology and data science, previously held senior roles at various Alphabet Inc. divisions, including Verily Life Sciences, Google Ventures, and Google X. His extensive experience in technology and computational biology complements S32's focus on investing in the frontiers of technology.

== Awards ==
Conrad was named one of the Top 25 Most Influential People in Biopharma 2015 by FierceBiotech.

== Publications ==
Conrad has more than eighty-five publications in scientific and medical journals.

== Personal life ==
On June 2, 2000, Conrad married actress Courtney Thorne-Smith; they separated in January 2001. He is currently married to Haylynn Cohen, a model, with whom he has two children.

Conrad is an avid surfer and has a casual dressing style.
