= Section 32 =

Section 32 may refer to:

- Section 32, a company
- Section 32 of the Canadian Charter of Rights and Freedoms
- Section 32 of the Constitution of Australia
- Section 32 of the Indian Penal Code, expanding the definition of acts to include acts of omission
