= Scuttling of the German fleet at Scapa Flow =

Destruction of interned warships, 21 June 1919

- Part of the aftermath of World War I
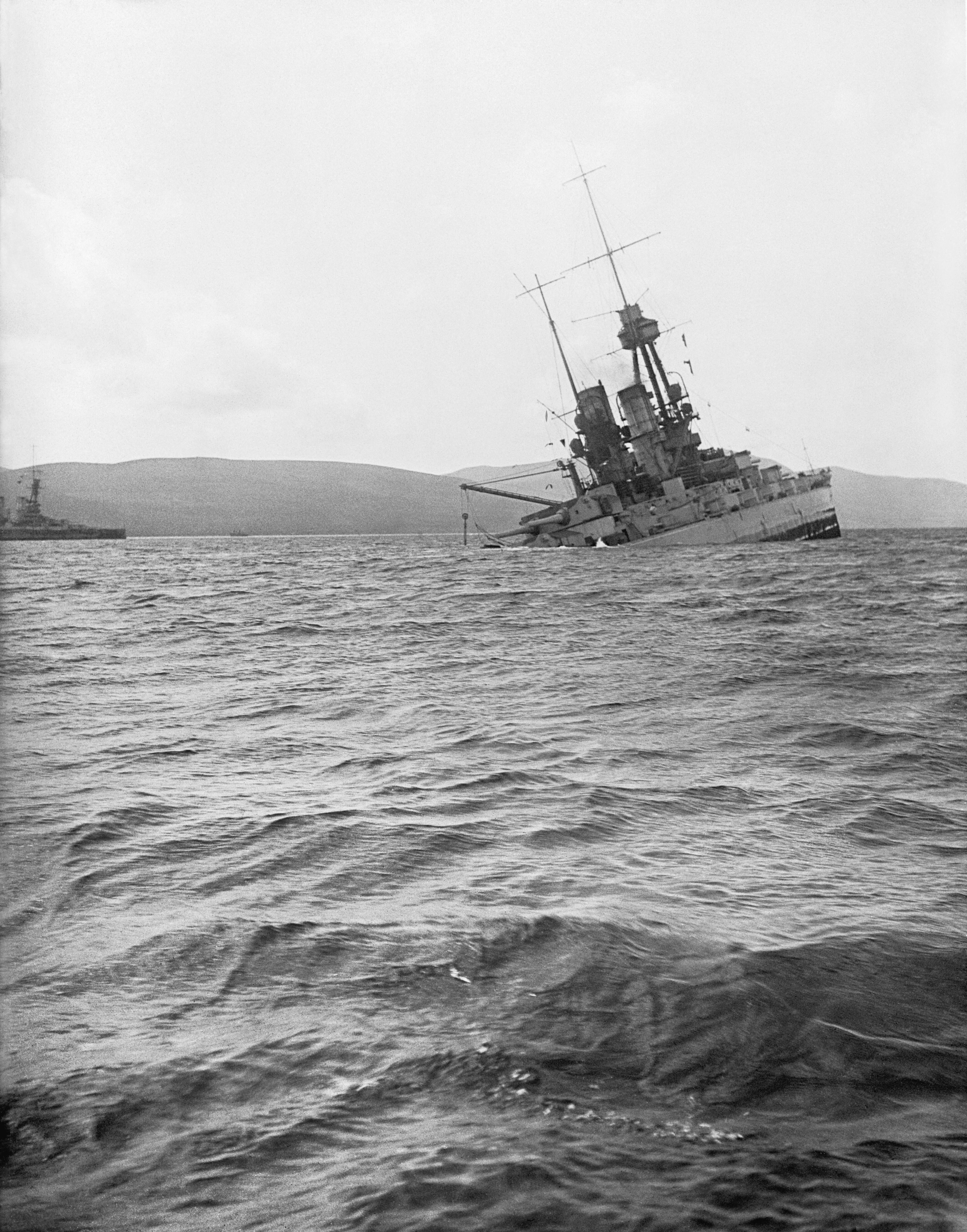
- Bayern sinking by the stern
Date	21 June 1919
Location	Scapa Flow, Orkney Islands, Scotland 58.89°N 3.18°W
Result	Majority of German fleet scuttled

Belligerents
United Kingdom	Germany

Commanders and leaders
Sydney Fremantle	Ludwig von Reuter

Units involved
First Battle Squadron	High Seas Fleet

Casualties and losses
None	9 killed; 16 wounded

On 21 June 1919 the Imperial German Navy's High Seas Fleet was scuttled by its sailors while held off the harbour of the British Royal Navy base at Scapa Flow, in the Orkney Islands of Scotland. The fleet was interned there at the end of World War I under the terms of the Armistice of 11 November 1918 while negotiations took place over its fate. Fearing that either the British would seize the ships unilaterally or the German government at the time might reject the Treaty of Versailles and resume the war effort (in which case the ships could be used against Germany), Admiral Ludwig von Reuter decided to scuttle the fleet.

Intervening British guard ships were able to beach some of the ships, but 52 of the 74 interned vessels sank. Many of the wrecks were salvaged over the next two decades and were towed away for scrapping. Those that remain are popular diving sites and a source of low-background steel.

== Background ==
The signing of the Armistice of 11 November 1918 with Germany, at Compiègne, France, effectively ended the First World War. The Allied powers agreed that Germany's U-boat fleet should be surrendered without the possibility of return, but were unable to agree upon a course of action regarding the German surface fleet. The Americans suggested that the ships be interned in a neutral port until a final decision was reached, but the two countries that were approached – Norway and Spain – both refused. Admiral Rosslyn Wemyss suggested that the fleet be interned at Scapa Flow with a skeleton crew of German sailors, and guarded in the interim by the Grand Fleet.

The terms were transmitted to Germany on 12 November 1918, instructing them to make the High Seas Fleet ready to sail by 18 November, or the Allies would occupy Heligoland.

John Lavery's painting of the German delegates arriving on HMS Queen Elizabeth

On the night of 15 November, Rear-Admiral Hugo Meurer, the representative of Admiral Franz von Hipper, met Admiral David Beatty aboard Beatty's flagship, HMS Queen Elizabeth. Beatty presented Meurer with the terms, which were expanded at a second meeting the following day. The U-boats were to surrender to Rear-Admiral Reginald Tyrwhitt at Harwich, under the supervision of the Harwich Force. The surface fleet was to sail to the Firth of Forth and surrender to Beatty. The ships would then be led to Scapa Flow and interned, pending the outcome of the peace negotiations. Meurer asked for an extension to the deadline, aware that the sailors were still in a mutinous mood (which earlier had led to the Wilhelmshaven mutiny), and that the officers might have difficulty in getting them to obey orders. Meurer eventually signed the terms after midnight.

== Surrender of the fleet ==
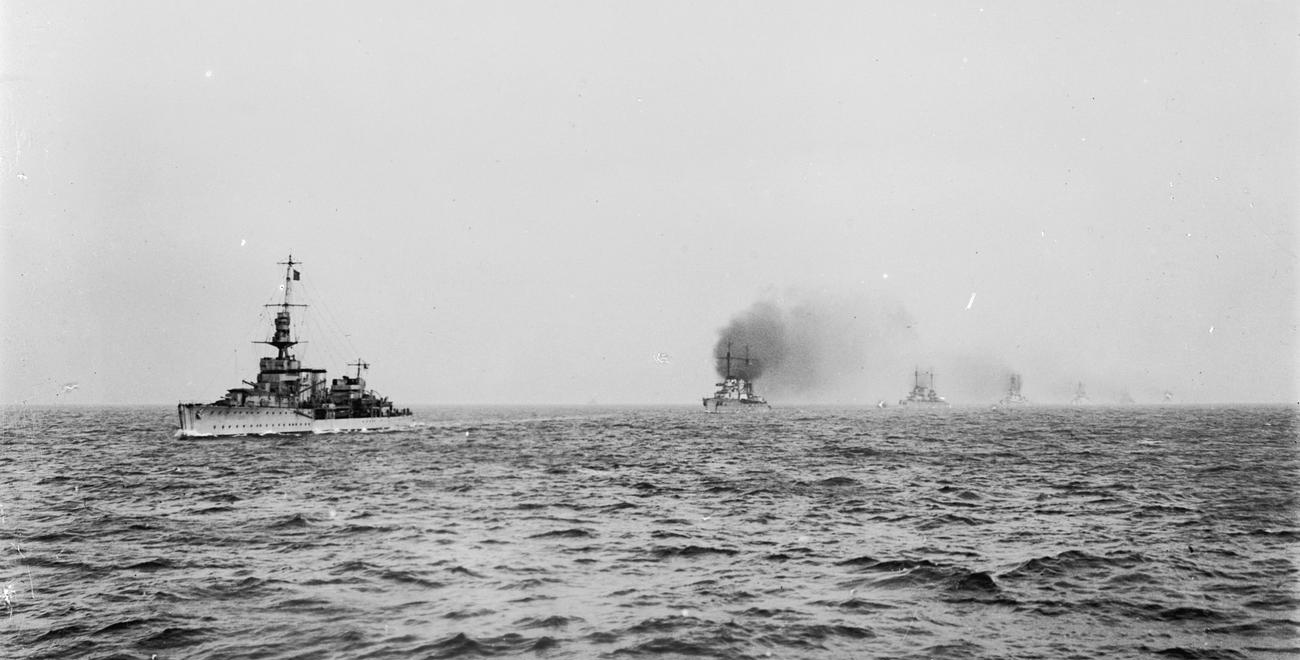
HMS Cardiff leading the fleet into the Firth of Forth

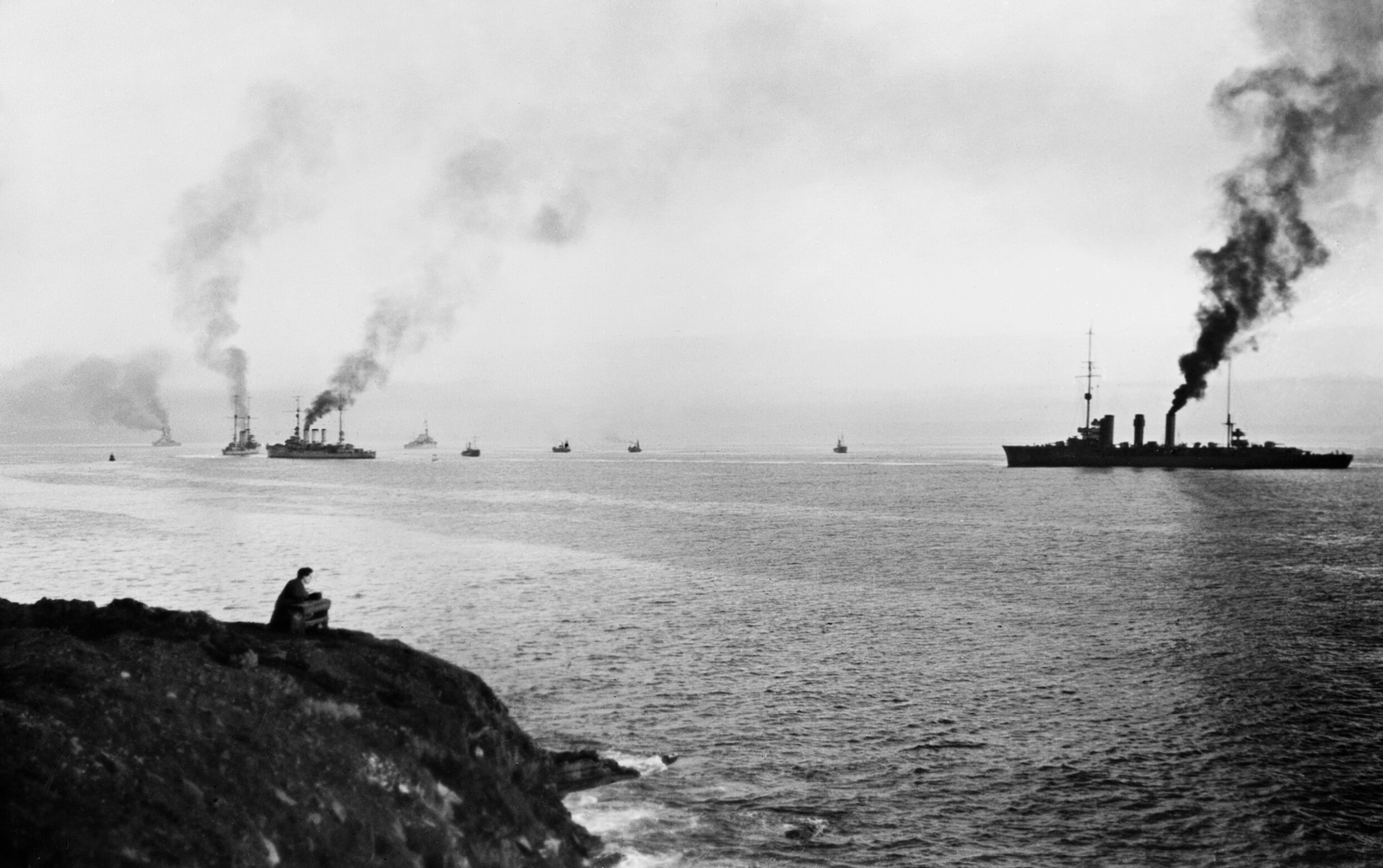
Emden, Frankfurt and Bremse entering Scapa Flow

The first craft to be surrendered were the U-boats, which began to arrive at Harwich on 20 November 1918; 176 were eventually handed over. Hipper refused to lead the surface fleet to the surrender, delegating the task to Rear-Admiral Ludwig von Reuter. The fleet was met by the light cruiser HMS Cardiff on the morning of 21 November, and was led to the rendezvous with over 370 ships of the Grand Fleet and other allied navies. There were 70 German ships in total; the battleship König and the light cruiser Dresden had engine trouble and had to be left behind. The destroyer V30 struck a mine while crossing, and sank.

The German ships were escorted into the Firth of Forth, where they anchored. Beatty signalled them:

The German flag will be hauled down at sunset today and will not be hoisted again without permission.

The fleet was then moved between 25 and 27 November to Scapa Flow; the destroyers to Gutter Sound and the battleships and cruisers to the north and west of the island of Cava. Eventually, a total of 74 ships were interned there, König and Dresden having arrived on 6 December accompanied by the destroyer V129, which replaced the sunken V30. The last ship to arrive was the battleship Baden on 9 January 1919. Initially, the interned ships were guarded by the Battle Cruiser Force (later reduced to the Battle Cruiser Squadron), commanded in succession by Vice-Admiral William Pakenham, Rear-Admiral Henry Oliver and Rear-Admiral Roger Keyes. On 1 May 1919, Vice-Admiral Sir Arthur Leveson and the Second Battle Squadron of the Atlantic Fleet took over guard duties, and were succeeded on 18 May by Vice-Admiral Sir Sydney Fremantle and the First Battle Squadron.

== In captivity ==
Internment at Scapa Flow on 25 March 1919

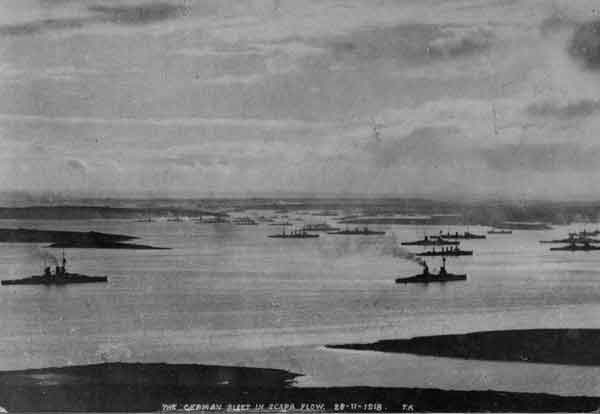
The fleet at Scapa Flow in November 1918

The naval historian Arthur Marder described the state of affairs on board the German ships during the internment as "one of complete demoralization". He identified four reasons that exacerbated the situation: lack of discipline, poor food, lack of recreation and slow postal service. The cumulative result of these problems created "indescribable filth in some of the ships". On 29 November the Second-in-Command of the Grand Fleet, Admiral Sir Charles Madden, wrote to his brother-in-law and former superior Lord Jellicoe that, "All proposed orders are considered and counter-signed by the men's committee before they are executed and then they are carried out as convenient". When visiting an interned ship the German officers were reported to have been "dumb with shame". Food was sent from Germany twice a month but was monotonous and not of good quality. Catching fish and seagulls provided a dietary supplement and some recreation. A large amount of brandy was also sent over. Recreation for the men was limited to their ships, as the British refused to allow any of the interned sailors to go ashore or visit any other German ships. British officers and men were only allowed to visit on official business. Outgoing post to Germany was censored from the beginning, and later incoming post also. German seamen were granted 300 cigarettes a month or 75 cigars. There were German doctors in the interned fleet but no dentists, and the British refused to provide dental care.

Command of the interned ships was exercised through Reuter, flying his flag in the battleship Friedrich der Grosse. He had a British drifter at his disposal for visiting ships and issuing written orders on urgent business, and his staff was occasionally allowed to visit other ships to arrange repatriation of officers and men. Reuter, whose health was poor, requested that his flag be transferred to the light cruiser Emden on 25 March after he was repeatedly prevented from sleeping by the stomping on his cabin roof by a group of revolutionary sailors called the "Red Guard". Over seven months the number of men in his command was continually reduced from the 20,000 men who had sailed the ships over in November. Four thousand returned to Germany on 3 December, 6,000 on 6 December and 5,000 on 12 December, leaving 4,815, of whom approximately 100 were repatriated a month.

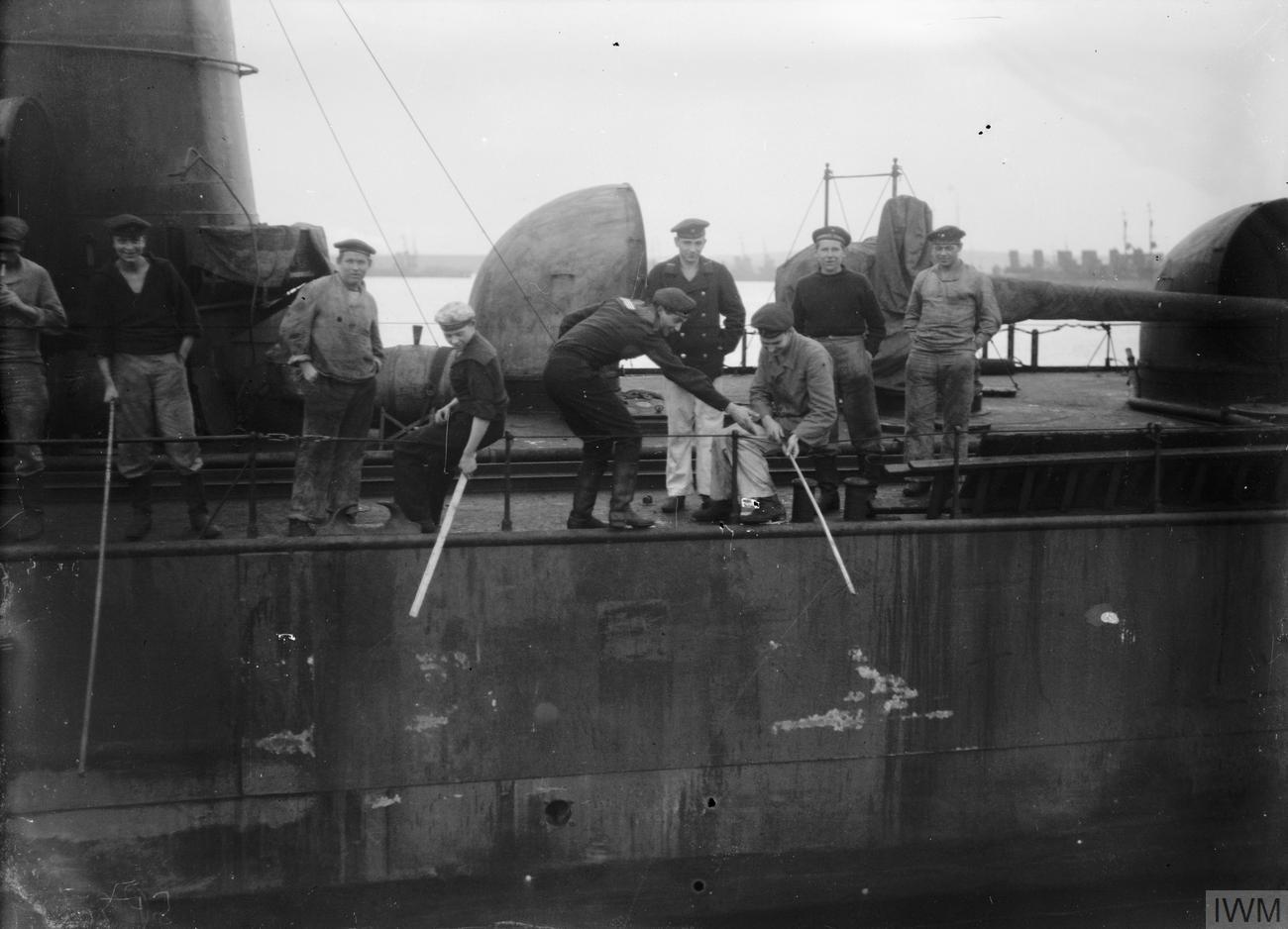
German sailors fishing over the side of a destroyer

Negotiations over the fate of the ships were under way at the Paris Peace Conference. The French and Italians each wanted a quarter of the ships. The British wanted them destroyed, since they knew that any redistribution would be detrimental to the proportional advantage in numbers they had compared to other navies. Under Article XXXI of the Armistice the Germans were not permitted to destroy their ships. Both Admirals Beatty and Madden had approved plans to seize the German ships in case scuttling was attempted; Admirals Keyes and Leveson recommended that the ships be seized anyway and the crews interned ashore at Nigg Island, but their suggestions were not taken up. Their concern was not without justification, for as early as January 1919, Reuter mentioned the possibility of scuttling the fleet to his chief of staff. Having learned of the possible terms of the Treaty of Versailles in May 1919, he began to prepare detailed plans to scuttle his ships. Admiral Erich Raeder later wrote that Reuter was informed that the fleet was to be scuttled at all costs. A further reduction of crews with the departure of two transports to Germany on 18 June 1919 meant that Reuter was left with reliable men to carry out preparations. On that day he sent out orders, paragraph 11 of which stated: "It is my intention to sink the ships only if the enemy should attempt to obtain possession of them without the assent of our government. Should our government agree in the peace to terms to the surrender of the ships, then the ships will be handed over, to the lasting disgrace of those who have placed us in this position." His orders were sent to the interned ships on 18 June.

In the meantime the signing of the Treaty of Versailles was scheduled for noon on 21 June 1919. The First Battle Squadron prepared to board the German ships in force to check for signs that the fleet was preparing to scuttle. On 13 June Admiral Madden requested in person at the Admiralty a daily political appreciation from 17 June onwards so as to be prepared to take action, but as Madden related to Beatty shortly afterwards, "they had no reliable indication of the German attitude towards the peace terms". Admiral Fremantle submitted to Madden on 16 June a scheme for seizing the German ships at midnight of 21/22 June, after the treaty was meant to be signed. Madden approved the plan on 19 June, but only after he was informed that the deadline for signing the treaty was extended to 19:00 on 23 June and he neglected to officially inform Fremantle. News of the extension was seen by Fremantle in a newspaper on the same day and he assumed it to be true. He had been under orders from Madden for some time to exercise his battleships against torpedo attacks, which required good weather in order to recover the torpedoes. The weather on the night of 20 June was favourable so Fremantle ordered the First Battle Squadron to sea at 09:00 the next day, 21 June. The operation to seize the German ships was postponed until the night of his squadron's return to Scapa Flow on 23 June, after the deadline to sign the treaty had expired. Fremantle later claimed that before he left Scapa he had unofficially informed Reuter that the armistice was still in effect.

== Fleet is scuttled ==
Around 10:00 a.m. on 21 June 1919, Reuter sent a flag signal ordering the fleet to stand by for the signal to scuttle. At about 11:20 the flag signal was sent: "To all Commanding Officers and the Leader of the Torpedo Boats. Paragraph Eleven of to-day's date. Acknowledge. Chief of the Interned Squadron." The signal was repeated by semaphore and searchlights. Scuttling began immediately: seacocks and flood valves were opened, internal water pipes smashed and drain valves on sewage tanks opened. Portholes had already been loosened, watertight doors and condenser covers left open, and in some ships holes had been bored through bulkheads, all to facilitate the spread of water once scuttling began. One German ship commander recorded that before 21 June, seacocks had been set on a hair turning and heavily lubricated, while large hammers had been placed beside valves.

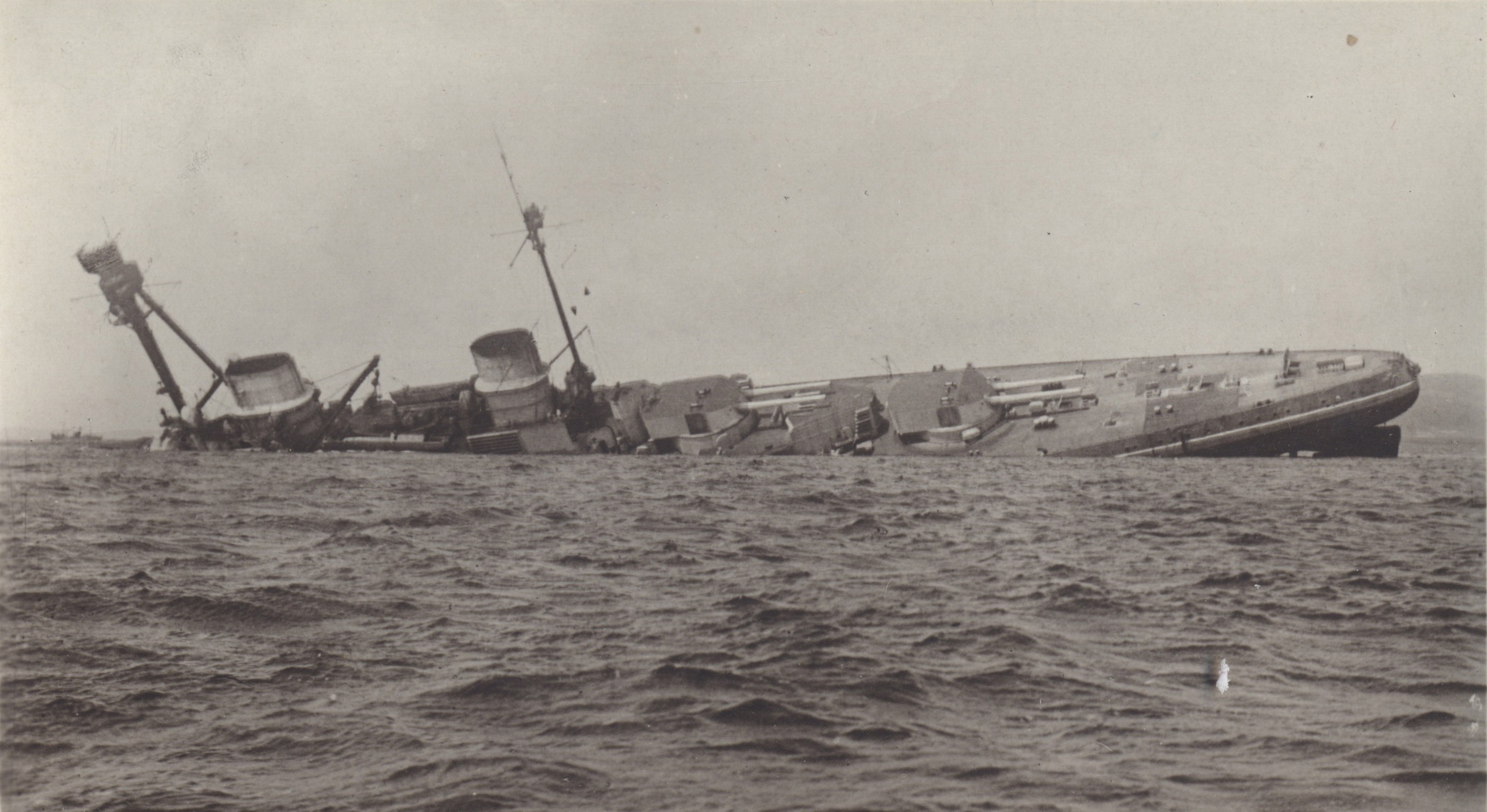
Derfflinger capsizes

There was no noticeable effect until noon, when Friedrich der Grosse began to list heavily to starboard and all the ships hoisted the Imperial German Ensign at their mainmasts. The crews then began to abandon ship. The British naval forces left at Scapa Flow comprised three destroyers, one of which was under repair, seven trawlers and a number of drifters. Fremantle started receiving news of the scuttling at 12:20 and cancelled his squadron's exercise at 12:35, steaming at full speed back to Scapa Flow. He and a division of ships arrived at 14:30 in time to see only the large ships still afloat. He had radioed ahead to order all available craft to prevent the German ships sinking or beach them. The last German ship to sink was the battlecruiser Hindenburg at 17:00, by which time 15 capital ships were sunk, and only Baden survived. Five light cruisers and 32 destroyers were also sunk. Nine German naval personnel were killed and about 16 wounded by panicked guards either on their ships or while rowing towards land in lifeboats.

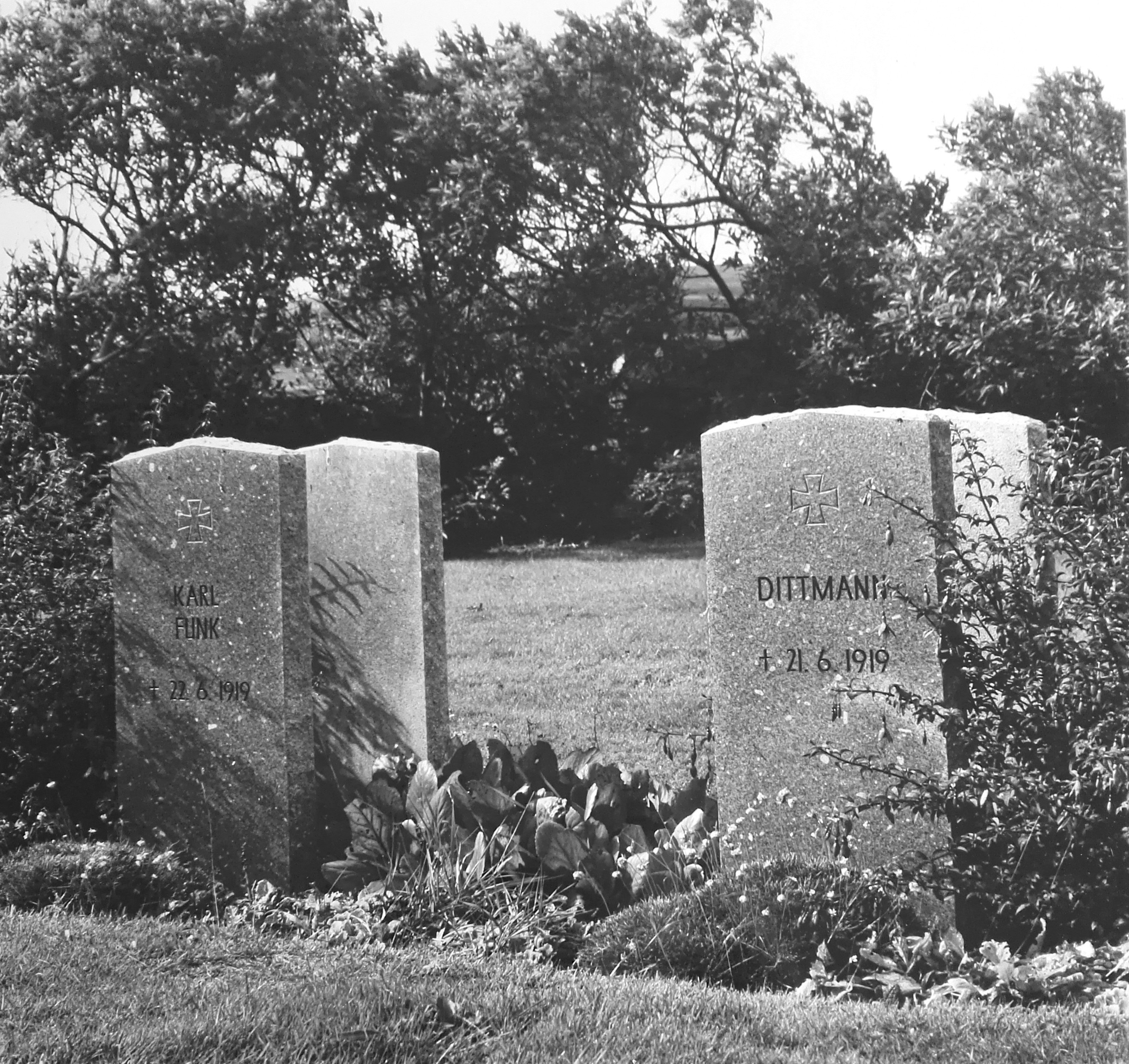
The graves of German sailors shot while attempting to come ashore surrendering.

During the afternoon, 1,774 Germans were picked up and transported by battleships of the First Battle Squadron to Invergordon. Fremantle had sent out a general order declaring that the Germans were to be treated as prisoners-of-war for having broken the armistice and they were destined for the prisoner-of-war camps at Nigg. Reuter and several of his officers were brought onto the quarterdeck of HMS Revenge, where Fremantle – through an interpreter – denounced their actions as dishonourable while Reuter and his men looked on "with expressionless faces". Admiral Fremantle subsequently remarked privately, "I could not resist feeling some sympathy for Reuter, who had preserved his dignity when placed against his will in a highly unpleasant and invidious position."

== Reactions ==
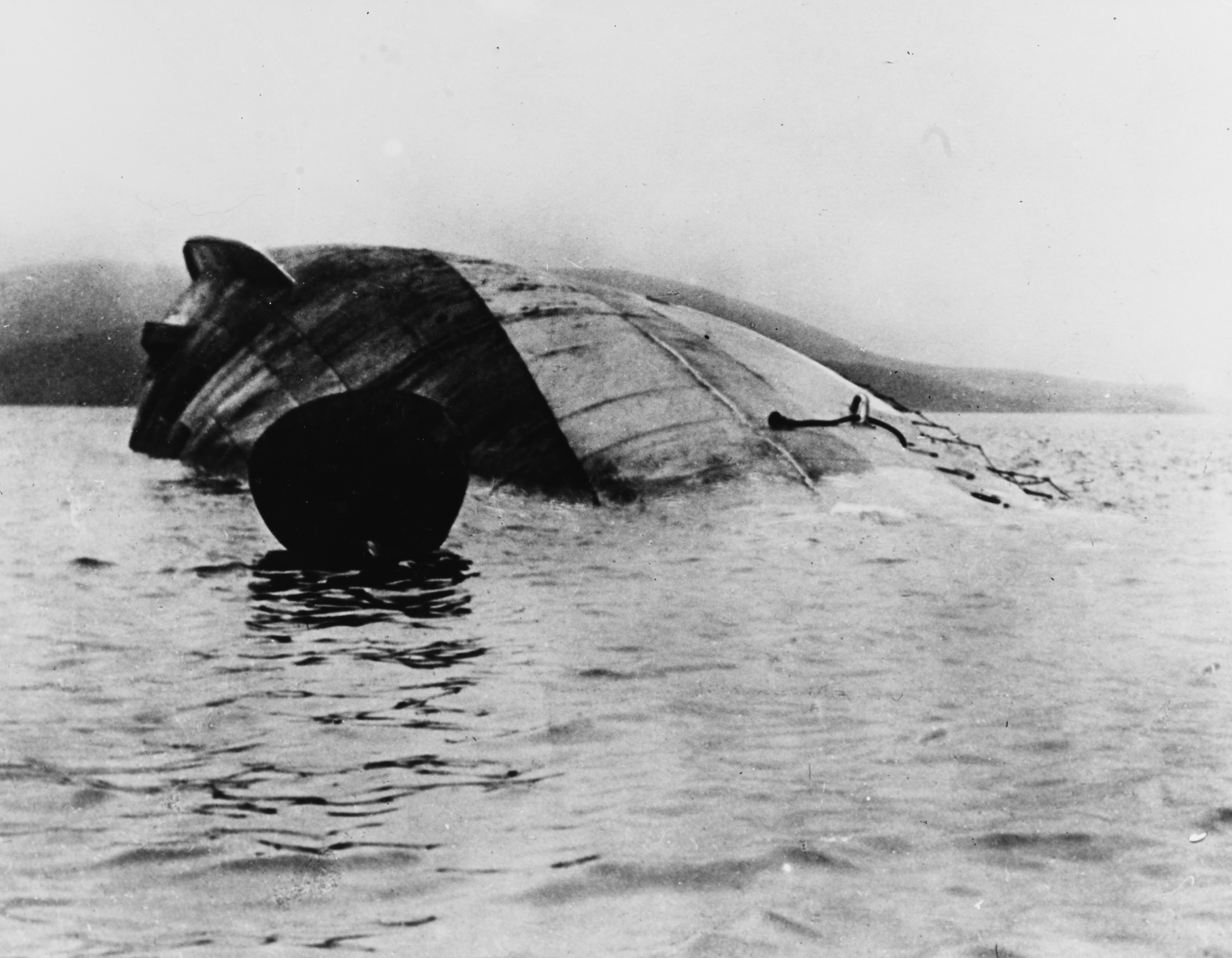
Seydlitz capsized

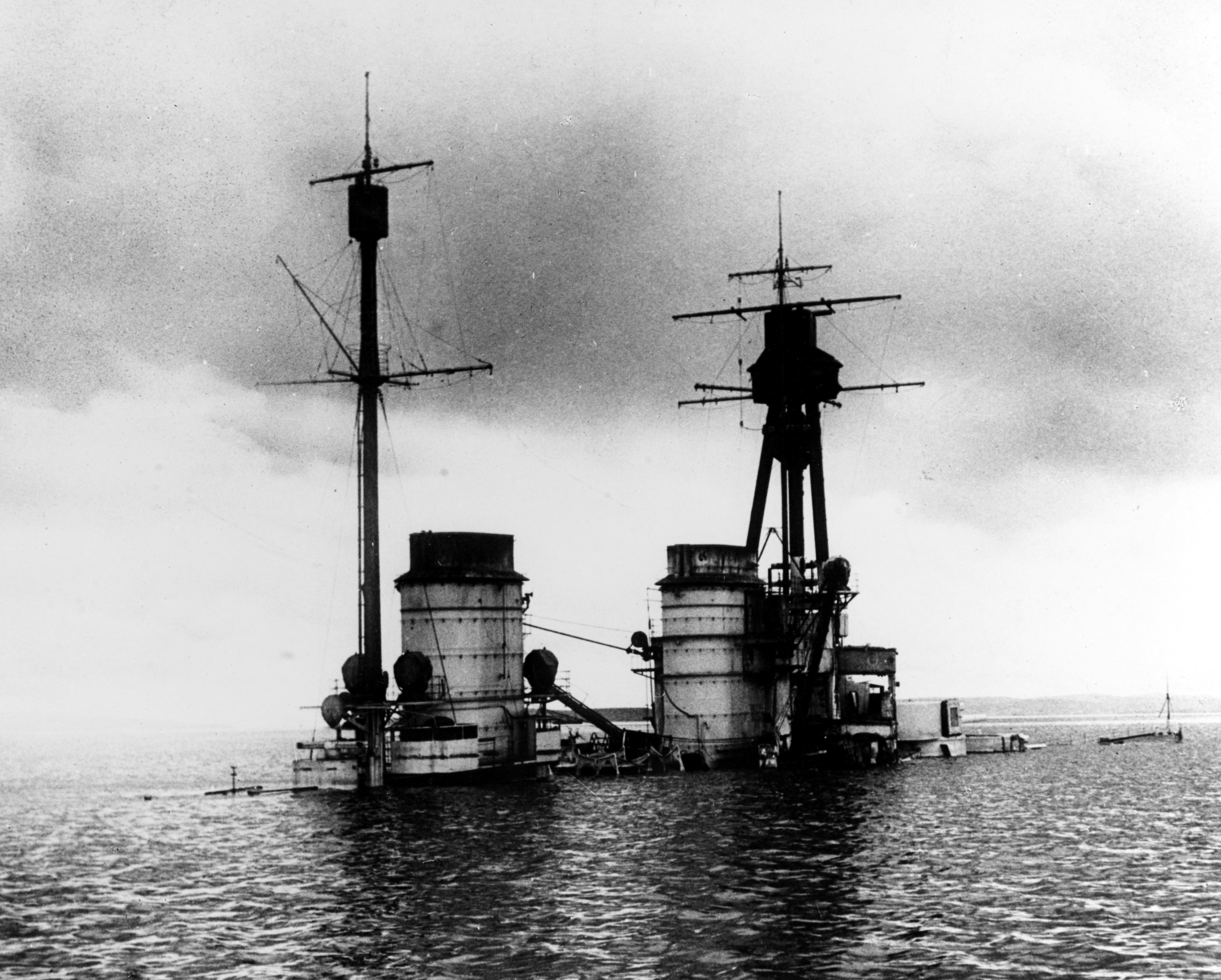
Only the upper works of Hindenburg remained above the water

The French were disappointed that the German fleet was gone, having hoped to acquire at least some of the ships. Admiral Wemyss privately remarked:

I look upon the sinking of the German fleet as a real blessing. It disposes, once and for all, the thorny question of the redistribution of these ships.

Admiral Reinhard Scheer declared:

I rejoice. The stain of surrender has been wiped from the escutcheon of the German Fleet. The sinking of these ships has proved that the spirit of the fleet is not dead. This last act is true to the best traditions of the German Navy.

== Aftermath ==
Of the 74 German ships at Scapa Flow, 15 of the 16 capital ships, 5 of the 8 cruisers, and 32 of the 50 destroyers were sunk. The remainder either remained afloat, or were towed to shallower waters and beached. The beached ships were later dispersed to the allied navies, but most of the sunken ships were initially left at the bottom of Scapa Flow, the cost of salvaging them being deemed to be not worth the potential returns, owing to the glut of scrap metal left after the end of the war, with plenty of obsolete warships having been broken up. After complaints from locals that the wrecks were a hazard to navigation, a salvage company was formed in 1923, which raised four of the sunken destroyers.

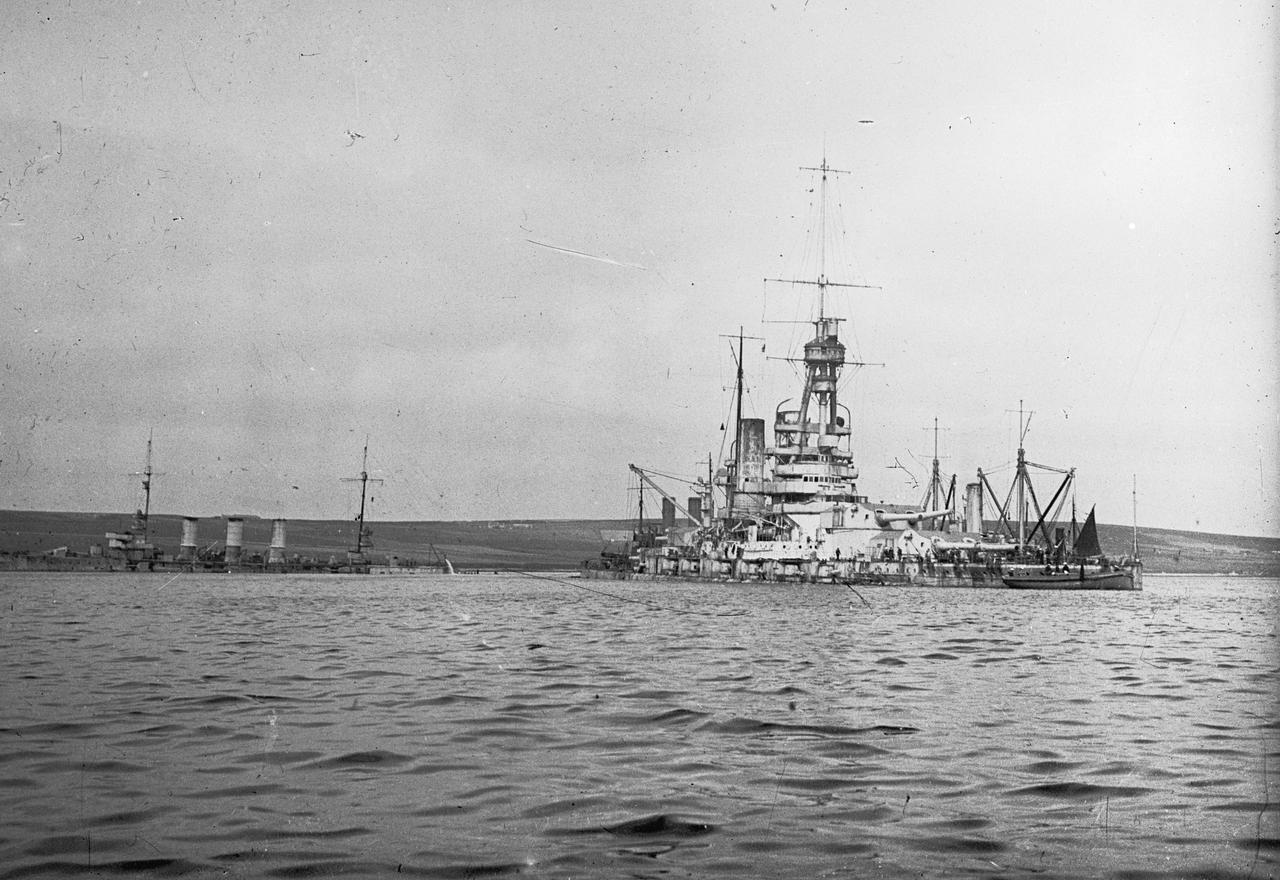
Salvage work in progress on Baden, while Frankfurt sits aground on the left

At about this time, the entrepreneur Ernest Cox became involved. He bought 26 destroyers from the Admiralty for £250 (equivalent to £15,000 in 2024), as well as Seydlitz and Hindenburg. He began operations to refloat the destroyers using an old German dry dock he purchased and subsequently modified. He was able to lift 24 of his 26 destroyers over the next year and a half, after which he began work on the larger vessels. He developed a new salvage technique whereby divers patched the holes in the submerged hulls, and pumped air into them to displace the water, letting them rise to the surface where they could then be towed to the breakers. Using this technique, he refloated several of the ships. His methods were costly, however, and the final cost of raising Hindenburg ran to some £30,000 (equivalent to £1,800,000 in 2024). Industrial action and a coal strike in 1926 nearly brought operations to a halt, but Cox instead dug out the coal in the submerged Seydlitz, using it to power his machines until the end of the strike. Salvaging Seydlitz also proved difficult, as the ship sank again during the first attempt to raise her, wrecking most of the salvage equipment. Undaunted, Cox tried again, ordering that when she was next raised, news cameras would be there to capture him witnessing the moment. The plan nearly backfired when Seydlitz was accidentally refloated while Cox was holidaying in Switzerland. Cox told the workers to sink her again, then returned to Scotland to be present as Seydlitz was duly refloated a third time. Cox's company eventually raised 26 destroyers, two battlecruisers and five battleships. Cox sold his remaining interests to the Alloa Shipbreaking Company (later Metal Industries Group) and retired as the "man who bought a navy". The latter company went on to raise a further five cruisers, battlecruisers and battleships, before the outbreak of the Second World War brought operations to a halt.

The remaining wrecks lie in deeper waters, in depths up to 47 metres (154 ft) and there has been no economic incentive to attempt to raise them since. They have changed ownership several times and minor salvage is still carried out to recover small pieces of steel. This low-background steel is used in the manufacture of radiation-sensitive devices, such as Geiger counters, as it is not contaminated with radioisotopes, having been produced before any chance of nuclear contamination.

The scrap from the raised ships was sold, with Nazi Germany using purchased scrap to construct the first ships and U-boats for the Kriegsmarine.

While the rebuilding of the German Army in the 1930s was based upon the combined myths of "invincibility on the battlefield" and the "stab in the back", the attitude and actions of the High Seas Fleet at Scapa Flow became a symbol of defiance for the new recruits and officers of the Kriegsmarine. The last living military witness to the scuttling of the fleet was Claude Choules, who died on 5 May 2011 aged 110. Choules was the last known living combat veteran of the First World War. An eyewitness account of the scuttling and the subsequent angry meeting between Reuter and Fremantle was published in 2015 by the family of Hugh David, who died in 1957. In 2019, the three battleships Markgraf, König and Kronprinz Wilhelm were sold on eBay (by the retiring diving contractor Tommy Clark) for £25,500 each to a Middle Eastern company. The cruiser, Karlsruhe, sold for £8,500 to a private bidder in England.

In 2001, seven of the remaining wrecks (three battleships and four cruisers) were scheduled under the Ancient Monuments and Archaeological Areas Act 1979 (as SM9298 and SM9308). Divers are allowed to visit them, as long as no damage occurs or objects removed. In 2025, protection was extended to the entire site when the Scottish government designated it as a marine protected area, which makes it a criminal offence to remove items from any of the wrecks.

== Centenary anniversary event ==
Two remembrance ceremonies took place on 21 June 2019 to mark the 100th anniversary of the scuttling of the German High Seas Fleet. The grandson, and three great-grandsons of von Reuter attended both services. The morning 'Reflection at Sea' service was held in the middle of the Flow at 11:00 am and was attended by dive charter vessels, the Orkney Ferries vessel Thorsvoe, Longhope Lifeboat and two ships from the Northern Lighthouse Board, Pharos and Polestar. The second ceremony was held at Lyness in the Royal Naval Cemetery by the graves of WWI German sailors.

== List of ships ==
Name	Type	Sunk/Beached	Fate
Baden	Battleship	Beached	Transferred to British control, sunk as a target in 1921
Bayern	Battleship	Sunk 14:30	Salvaged September 1934
Friedrich der Grosse	Battleship	Sunk 12:16	Salvaged 1936
Grosser Kurfürst	Battleship	Sunk 13:30	Salvaged April 1938
Kaiser	Battleship	Sunk 13:15	Salvaged March 1929
Kaiserin	Battleship	Sunk 14:00	Salvaged May 1936
König	Battleship	Sunk 14:00	Unsalvaged
König Albert	Battleship	Sunk 12:54	Salvaged July 1934
Kronprinz Wilhelm	Battleship	Sunk 13:15	Unsalvaged
Markgraf	Battleship	Sunk 16:45	Unsalvaged
Prinzregent Luitpold	Battleship	Sunk 13:15	Salvaged March 1931
Derfflinger	Battlecruiser	Sunk 14:45	Salvaged August 1939
Hindenburg	Battlecruiser	Sunk 17:00	Salvaged July 1930
Moltke	Battlecruiser	Sunk 13:10	Salvaged June 1927
Seydlitz	Battlecruiser	Sunk 13:50	Salvaged November 1928
Von der Tann	Battlecruiser	Sunk 14:15	Salvaged December 1930
Bremse	Cruiser	Sunk 14:30	Salvaged November 1929
Brummer	Cruiser	Sunk 13:05	Unsalvaged
Cöln	Cruiser	Sunk 13:50	Unsalvaged
Dresden	Cruiser	Sunk 13:50	Unsalvaged
Emden	Cruiser	Beached	Transferred to French control, broken up in 1926
Frankfurt	Cruiser	Beached	Transferred to American control, sunk as a target in 1921
Karlsruhe	Cruiser	Sunk 15:50	Unsalvaged
Nürnberg	Cruiser	Beached	Transferred to British control, sunk as a target in 1922
S32	Destroyer	Sunk	Salvaged June 1925
S36	Destroyer	Sunk	Salvaged April 1925
G38	Destroyer	Sunk	Salvaged September 1924
G39	Destroyer	Sunk	Salvaged July 1925
G40	Destroyer	Sunk	Salvaged July 1925
V43	Destroyer	Beached	Transferred to American control, sunk as a target in 1921
V44	Destroyer	Beached	Transferred to British control, broken up in 1922
V45	Destroyer	Sunk	Salvaged 1922
V46	Destroyer	Beached	Transferred to French control, broken up in 1924
S49	Destroyer	Sunk	Salvaged December 1924
S50	Destroyer	Sunk	Salvaged October 1924
S51	Destroyer	Beached	Transferred to British control, broken up in 1922
S52	Destroyer	Sunk	Salvaged October 1924
S53	Destroyer	Sunk	Salvaged August 1924
S54	Destroyer	Sunk	Partially salvaged
S55	Destroyer	Sunk	Salvaged August 1924
S56	Destroyer	Sunk	Salvaged June 1925
S60	Destroyer	Beached	Transferred to Japanese control, broken up in 1922
S65	Destroyer	Sunk	Salvaged May 1922
V70	Destroyer	Sunk	Salvaged August 1924
V73	Destroyer	Beached	Transferred to British control, broken up in 1922
V78	Destroyer	Sunk	Salvaged September 1925
V80	Destroyer	Beached	Transferred to Japanese control, broken up in 1922
V81	Destroyer	Beached	Sunk on the way to the breakers
V82	Destroyer	Beached	Transferred to British control, broken up in 1922
V83	Destroyer	Sunk	Salvaged 1923
V86	Destroyer	Sunk	Salvaged July 1925
V89	Destroyer	Sunk	Salvaged December 1922
V91	Destroyer	Sunk	Salvaged September 1924
G92	Destroyer	Beached	Transferred to British control, broken up in 1922
V100	Destroyer	Beached	Transferred to French control, broken up in 1921
G101	Destroyer	Sunk	Salvaged April 1926
G102	Destroyer	Beached	Transferred to American control, sunk as a target in 1921
G103	Destroyer	Sunk	Salvaged September 1925
G104	Destroyer	Sunk	Salvaged April 1926
B109	Destroyer	Sunk	Salvaged March 1926
B110	Destroyer	Sunk	Salvaged December 1925
B111	Destroyer	Sunk	Salvaged March 1926
B112	Destroyer	Sunk	Salvaged February 1926
V125	Destroyer	Beached	Transferred to British control, broken up in 1922
V126	Destroyer	Beached	Transferred to French control, broken up in 1925
V127	Destroyer	Beached	Transferred to Japanese control, broken up in 1922
V128	Destroyer	Beached	Transferred to British control, broken up in 1922
V129	Destroyer	Sunk	Salvaged August 1925
S131	Destroyer	Sunk	Salvaged August 1924
S132	Destroyer	Beached	Transferred to American control, sunk in 1921
S136	Destroyer	Sunk	Salvaged April 1925
S137	Destroyer	Beached	Transferred to British control, broken up in 1922
S138	Destroyer	Sunk	Salvaged May 1925
H145	Destroyer	Sunk	Salvaged March 1925

== Reception ==
=== Memoirs ===
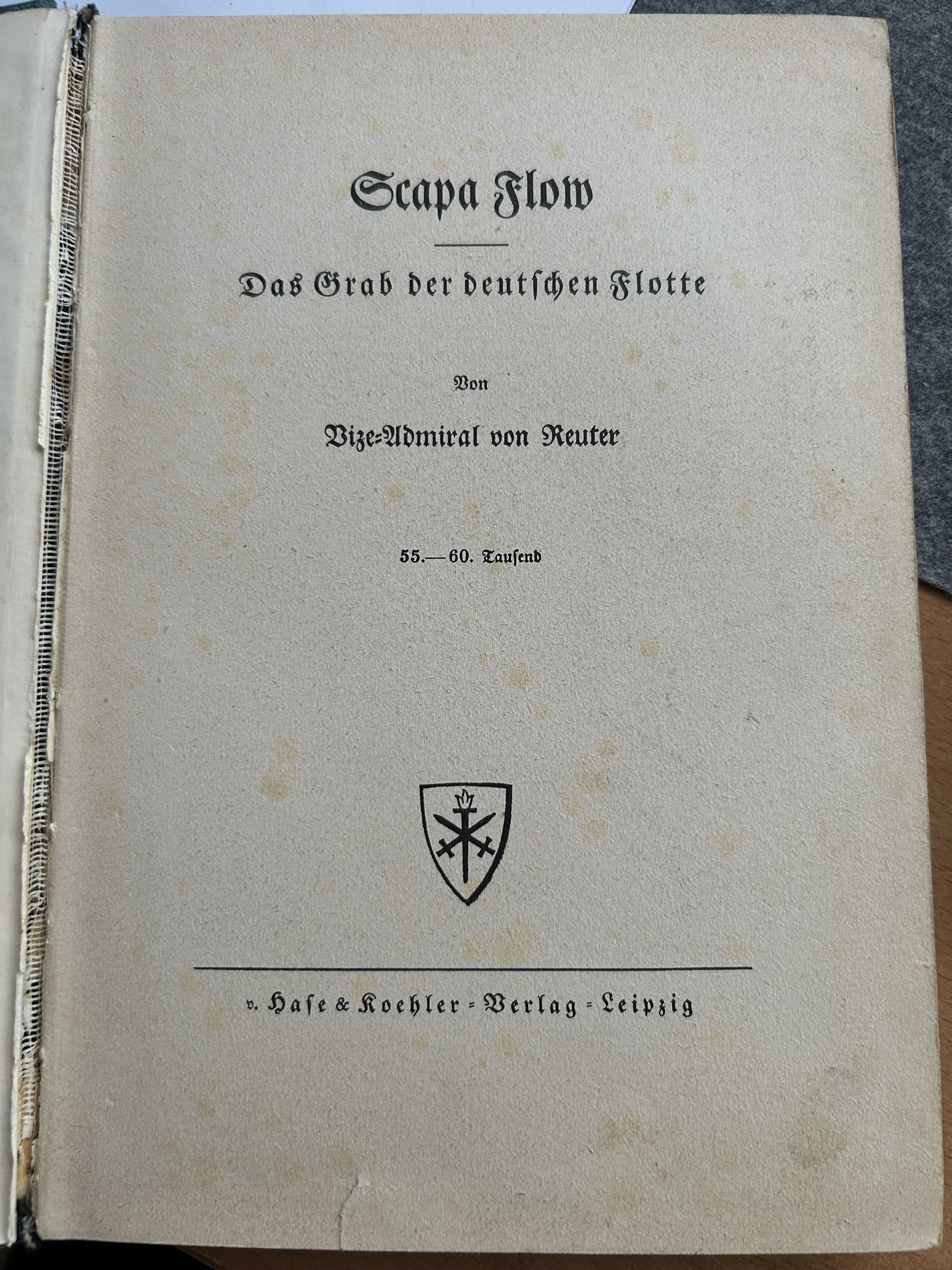
Memoirs of Admiral Ludwig von Reuter about the Scuttling of the German fleet at Scapa Flow, 1921.

In 1921, von Reuter published his memoirs, ‘Scapa Flow – Das Grab der deutschen Flotte' (The Grave of the German Fleet).

=== Popular culture ===
The circumstances of the event as well as computer generated 'scans' of the remaining scuttled ships on the seabed featured in an episode of the National Geographic documentary Drain the Oceans.

Kris Drever's song "Scapa Flow 1919" explores the events from a German sailor's viewpoint.

== See also ==
- Scuttling of the Peruvian fleet at El Callao – during the War of the Pacific, 1881
- Scuttling of the French fleet at Toulon – during the Second World War, 1942
- Operation Deadlight
- Operation Regenbogen (U-boat)

== Bibliography ==
- Butler, Daniel Allen (2006). Distant Victory: The Battle of Jutland and the Allied Triumph in the First World War. Greenwood. ISBN 0275990737.
- Fine, John Christopher (2004). Lost on the Ocean Floor: Diving the World's Ghost Ships. Naval Institute Press. ISBN 159114275X.
- Fremantle, Admiral Sir Sydney Robert (1949). My Naval Career: 1880–1928. Hutchinson.
- Marder, Arthur Jacob (1970). From the Dreadnought to Scapa Flow, The Royal Navy in the Fisher Era, 1904–1919: 1917: Victory and Aftermath. Vol. V. London: Oxford University Press. ISBN 0192151878.
- Maritime and Coastguard Agency (2007). "Wrecks designated as Maritime Scheduled Ancient Monuments". MCA Receiver of Wreck. mcga.gov.uk. Archived from the original on 17 April 2010.
- Massie, Robert K. (2004). Castles of Steel: Britain, Germany, and the Winning of the Great War at Sea. New York: Ballantine Books. ISBN 0345408780.
- Raeder, Grand Admiral Erich (1960). My Life. Annapolis, MD: United States Naval Institute.
- Reuter, Ludwig von (1940). Scapa Flow: The Greatest Scuttling of All Time. London: Hurst & Blackett.
- von Ruge, Friedrich (1969). Scapa Flow 1919: Das Ende der deutschen Flotte (in German). East Berlin: Oldenburg.
- van der Vat, Dan (2000). Standard of Power: The Royal Navy in the Twentieth Century. London: Random House. ISBN 0712665358.
- van der Vat, Dan (2007) [1987]. The Grand Scuttle: The Sinking of the German Fleet at Scapa Flow in 1919. Edinburgh: Birlinn Ltd. ISBN 9781843410386.
