= Haylynn Cohen =

American model

- Born: October 9, 1980 (age 45); Brooklyn, New York, U.S.
- Occupation: Fashion model
- Years active: 1999–present
- Known for: Versace model
- Spouse: Andrew Conrad
- Children: 2
- Modeling information
- Height: 1.75 m (5 ft 9 in)
- Hair color: Dark brown
- Eye color: Hazel

Haylynn Cohen (born October 9, 1980) is an American model and City Council member of Malibu, California.

== Early life ==
Cohen was born in Brooklyn, New York and is of Jewish heritage. A native of Brooklyn, her brother is Adam Cohen of Mommyheads. She was discovered while skateboarding as a Lincoln High School student.

== Modeling career ==
Cohen is most notable for her modeling career. She has appeared on the cover of Vogue Paris and in the 2000 Victoria's Secret Fashion Show. She did extensive runway and print work for many notable fashion companies between 1999 and 2001. She has worked with renowned photographers including Steven Meisel, Carter Smith, Mikael Jansson, and Peter Lindbergh.

=== Advertising ===
Cohen has worked in advertising campaigns for numerous fashion brands:

- Armani Exchange
- Burberry
- C Ronson
- DKNY
- Evan Picone
- Gap
- Guy Laroche
- Hugo Boss
- J.Crew
- John Frieda
- Kenneth Cole
- Louis Vuitton
- Missoni
- Olay
- Philosophy di Alberta Ferretti
- Piazza Sempione
- Realway
- Saks Fifth Avenue
- Tommy Hilfiger
- Versace
- Victor Victoria

=== Magazine covers ===
Cohen has appeared on the covers of several major fashion magazines:

- 1999 L'Official
- 1999 Vogue Paris
- 1999 Vogue Spain
- 2000 Glamour Italy
- 2001 Vogue Australia
- 2002 Cosmopolitan
- D Magazine 4 times

=== Fashion shows ===
Cohen walked in runway shows for major fashion houses from 1999 to 2001:

Ready-to-wear Spring/Summer 1999

- Chloe

Ready-to-wear Autumn/Winter 1999

- Burberry

Ready-to-wear Spring/Summer 2000

- Alberta Ferretti
- Alessandro Dell'Acqua
- Anna Molinari
- Antonio Berardi
- Blumarine
- Bottega Veneta
- Byblos
- Callaghan
- Calvin Klein
- Cerruti
- Chanel
- Christian Dior
- Christian Lacroix
- Costume National
- Cynthia Rowley
- DKNY
- Emanuel Ungaro
- Herve Leger
- Jill Stuart
- Koji Tatsuno
- Les Copains
- Loewe
- Marc Jacobs
- Mila Schon
- Narciso Rodriguez
- Nicole Farhi
- Nicole Miller
- Nina Ricci
- Paco Rabanne
- Ralph Lauren
- Rebecca Danenberg
- Sportmax
- TSE
- Ter et Bantine
- Trussardi
- Versace
- Versus
- Victor Alfaro
- Victor Victoria
- Vivienne Tam
- YSL Rive Gauche

Ready-to-wear Autumn/Winter 2000

- AA Milano
- Anteprima
- Betsey Johnson
- Blumarine
- Cerruti
- Chaiken
- Chanel
- Christian Dior
- Christina Perrin
- Costume National
- Emanuel Ungaro
- Exté
- Fendi
- Jill Stuart
- Joop
- Junko Shimada
- Koji Tatsuno
- Loewe
- Marc Jacobs
- Mark Eisen
- Mila Schon
- Narciso Rodriguez
- Nina Ricci
- Ralph Lauren
- Rebecca Danenberg
- Rifat Ozbek
- Sportmax
- TSE
- Tuleh
- Versace
- Versus
- Vivienne Tam

Ready-to-wear Spring/Summer 2001

- AA Milano
- Alessandro Dell'Acqua
- Andrew Gn
- Anna Molinari
- Bill Blass
- Blumarine
- Calvin Klein
- Chanel
- Christian Lacroix
- Etro
- Genny
- John Richmond
- Junko Shimada
- Koji Tatsuno
- Lizzy Disney
- Loewe
- Marcel Marongiu
- Mila Schon
- Rebecca Taylor
- Sally Penn
- Sportmax
- TSE
- Ter et Bantine
- Trussardi
- Versace
- Versus

Ready-to-wear Autumn/Winter 2001

- Alberto Biani
- Blumarine
- Chaiken
- Christian Lacroix
- Daryl K
- Isabel Marant
- Marcel Marongiu
- Mila Schon
- Sportmax
- Trussardi

Special shows

- Victoria's Secret Fashion Show (2000)

== Business ventures ==
In 2002, Cohen opened a nightclub named Joey's on Avenue B in Manhattan's East Village. The business was financed by Oliver Stone and Stephen Dorff.

== Political career ==
Cohen ran for Malibu City Council in 2024 and won 20.11% of the vote, earning a seat on the council.

== Personal life ==
Cohen dated Joe Gossett from 2002 until their breakup in 2004. She is married to American geneticist Andrew Conrad. Together they have two children.

Cohen has purchased and sold property in Manhattan, New York in the Soho neighborhood.
