= Terri Burns =

Investor

- Born: February 22, 1994 (age 32)
- Education: New York University
- Occupations: Partner, GV; Engineer, Venmo

Terri Burns (born February 22, 1994) is an American investor and partner at GV (formerly Google Ventures). After joining the company in 2017 as a principal, she was promoted and became the youngest partner and first Black woman partner at GV in 2020.

== Early life and education ==
Burns was born on February 22, 1994 and was raised in California. She graduated from New York University's Courant Institute of Mathematical Sciences with a bachelor’s degree in computer science in 2016, and in 2021, became the youngest member in history to serve on the university's board of trustees.

== Career ==
Burns joined the GV team in 2017 as a principal investor. In 2020, she became the youngest partner and first Black woman partner at GV. In 2021, she became the youngest member of the NYU Board of Trustees at age 27, and was named to the Forbes 30 Under 30 list. Her first investment was a $1 million seed round in Have a Great Summer (HAGS), a Gen-Z-founded startup and social network. Previously, she was a front-end engineer at Venmo and an associate product manager at Twitter where she met the GV team.

Burns was also a contributing writer for publications including Teen Vogue and Forbes, documenting her journey into product management and the technology sector.

== Awards ==
- 2021: GCV Rising Stars Award
- 2020: Forbes 30 Under 30
