= The Magic Hour (talk show) =

- Genre: Talk show
- Written by: Bart Jennett; Colin Quashie; Ernest Nyle Brown
- Directed by: Michael Dimich
- Presented by: Magic Johnson
- Announcer: Peter Michael; Craig Shoemaker; Jimmy Hodson
- Composers: Alan Ari Lazar; James Leach; Lexy Shroyer
- Country of origin: United States
- Original language: English
- No. of seasons: 1

Production
- Executive producers: Giovanni Brewer; Jeffrey Fischgrund; Earvin "Magic" Johnson; Lon Rosen
- Producers: Joe Revello; Lora Wiley; Ernest Nyle Brown
- Running time: 45–48 minutes
- Production companies: Fox Nitetime Productions; Magic Johnson Entertainment; 20th Century Fox Television

Original release
- Network: Syndicated
- Release: June 8 – September 4, 1998

The Magic Hour is an American syndicated late-night talk show created by and starring basketball player Magic Johnson. The series aired in syndication from June to September 1998.

== Synopsis ==
Soon after its debut, the series was panned by critics citing Johnson's apparent nervousness as a host, his overly complimentary tone with his celebrity guests, and lack of chemistry with his sidekick, comedian Craig Shoemaker. Before Shoemaker was chosen, the role was offered to Stephen Colbert and Jimmy Kimmel. Both rejected the role as they didn't think the character would work. The series was quickly retooled with Shoemaker being relieved of his 'sidekick' responsibilities and relegated to the supporting cast after the third episode. Comedian Steve White (who had been part of the supporting cast) became the new sidekick for a period of time. Los Angeles radio personality and KCOP-TV sports anchor Kenny Sargent was considered for Johnson's new Ed McMahon-styled side man; comedian and actor Tommy Davidson was chosen as the new sidekick, and Johnson interacted more with the show band leader Sheila E. Jimmy Hodson was the show's announcer and a comedy cast member. The format of the show was also changed to include more interview time with celebrity guests.

=== Howard Stern appearance ===
One vocal critic of The Magic Hour was Howard Stern. Stern would regularly mock Johnson's diction and hosting abilities on his popular morning show. In an attempt to confront Stern (and to boost ratings), Stern was booked to appear on the show as a guest (along with Playboy Playmate Karen McDougal). Stern appeared on the July 2 broadcast with the band, the Losers, and played the song "Wipe Out". While being interviewed by Johnson, Stern asked Johnson about his lifestyle prior to contracting HIV and if he practiced safe sex with his wife. Stern also asked about "the white guy comedian", referring to Johnson's previous sidekick, Craig Shoemaker, who had been fired shortly before Stern's appearance for publicly calling the show "an absolute nightmare" (Stern mocked Shoemaker's short-lived replacement, Steve White, predicting he wouldn't last long, which came true).

== Cancellation ==
The highly publicized episode featuring Stern increased viewership for a time, but ratings soon dropped off. The series was canceled after eight weeks.

Johnson later blamed the demise of his talk show on a lack of support from black celebrities who refused or could not appear on his show. Johnson claimed, "Their managers and agents keep them off of the black shows."

== In popular culture ==
In his book What Were They Thinking? The 100 Dumbest Events in Television History, author David Hofstede ranked the show at #26 on the list.

== See also ==
- The Chevy Chase Show
- The New Tom Green Show
