= Courtney Thorne-Smith =

American actress (born 1966 or 1967)

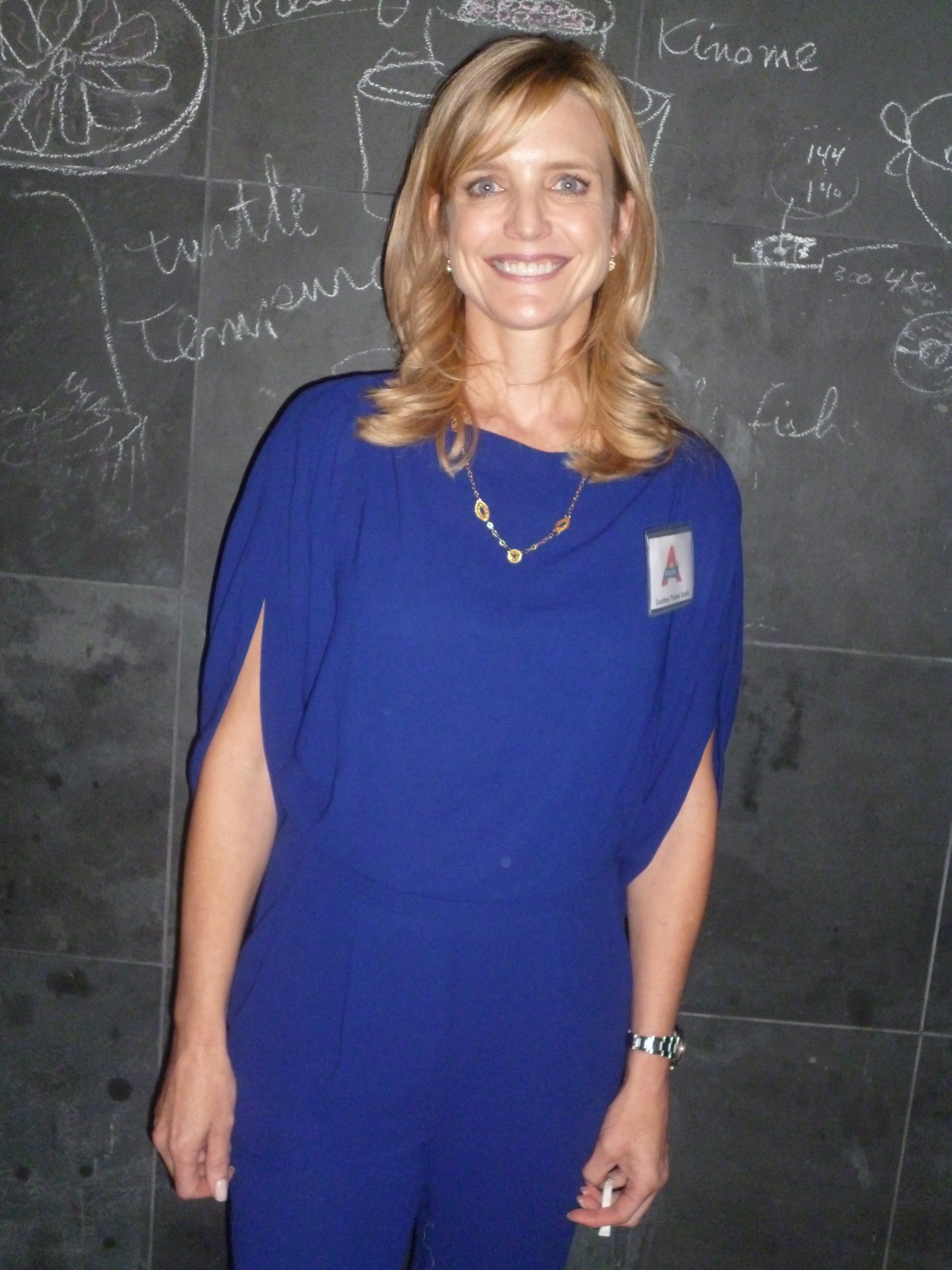
- Thorne-Smith in 2013
- Born: November 8, 1967 (age 59); San Francisco, California
- Occupation: Actress
- Years active: 1986–present
- Known for: Melrose Place; Ally McBeal; According to Jim
- Spouses: Andrew Conrad (m. 2000; div. 2001); Roger Fishman (m. 2007; sep. 2021)
- Children: 1

Courtney Thorne-Smith (born November 8, 1967) is an American actress. She is known for her starring roles as Alison Parker on Melrose Place, Georgia Thomas on Ally McBeal, and Cheryl on According to Jim, as well as her recurring role on Two and a Half Men as Lyndsey McElroy.

== Early life ==
Thorne-Smith was born in San Francisco, California. She attended Menlo-Atherton High School, in Atherton, California, but she graduated from Tamalpais High School, in Mill Valley, California, in 1985. She performed with the Ensemble Theater Company in Mill Valley while attending high school.

== Career ==
=== Films ===
Thorne-Smith made her first film appearance in the 1986 feature film drama Lucas, alongside Kerri Green, Winona Ryder, Corey Haim, and Charlie Sheen. She was also involved in a number of movies in the late 1980s, such as Welcome to 18 (1986), Revenge of the Nerds II: Nerds in Paradise (1987), Summer School (1987), and Side Out (1990). In 1998, she starred in the box office flop Chairman of the Board with Carrot Top. In 2009, she appeared in Sorority Wars.

=== Television ===
She appeared on a few mid-1980s television series such as Growing Pains and the short-lived Fast Times, as well as made-for-television movies including The Thanksgiving Promise and Infidelity before landing a regular role in the 1988–1989 sitcom Day by Day with Douglas Sheehan, Linda Kelsey and Julia Louis-Dreyfus. In 1990, she was featured in six episodes of L.A. Law as Laker Girl Kimberly Dugan.

Her first notable starring television role was as Alison Parker on Melrose Place from 1992 to 1997. During this time, in 1995, she starred in a made-for-television movie Beauty's Revenge which was also marketed in CD and DVD form as "Midwest Obsession". Following this, she went on to play Georgia Thomas on Ally McBeal from 1997 to 2000. Thorne-Smith originally auditioned for the title role, which ultimately went to Calista Flockhart. Her character was written out of Ally McBeal at the beginning of season four in 2000, though she returned for occasional guest appearances afterwards. She later said that she left the show in part because of the pressure to stay thin. "I started undereating, overexercising, pushing myself too hard and brutalizing my immune system," she told US Weekly. "The amount of time I spent thinking about food and being upset about my body was insane."

From 2001 to 2009, she starred as Cheryl on According to Jim. In 2007, her real-life pregnancy was hidden on the show at first, but was then written into the plot. On February 18, 2010, she signed on to play Alan Harper's (Jon Cryer) girlfriend, Lyndsey McElroy, in season seven of Two and a Half Men. She appeared in 52 episodes from season seven through twelve.

From 2017 to 2019, Thorne-Smith starred in a series of three television films, the Emma Fielding Mysteries on the Hallmark Movies & Mysteries channel, based on the novels by Dana Cameron.

=== Writing ===
On September 18, 2007, Thorne-Smith's novel, Outside In, was published by Broadway Books in New York.

=== Other ventures ===
In 1997, she became a spokesperson for cosmetics brand Almay, being the face of their new "Skin Stays Clean" line of make-up. She appeared for Almay's print ads and television commercials until 2001. In 2003, Thorne-Smith appeared on Kellogg's Special K cereal boxes as part of a breast cancer awareness campaign with Kellogg's and the Susan G. Komen Breast Cancer Foundation.

During her career, she has appeared on the cover of magazines such as Shape, Parade, Self, InStyle Weddings, Entertainment Weekly, TV Guide, Vogue Knitting and Fit Pregnancy.

== Personal life ==
On June 2, 2000, Thorne-Smith married genetic scientist Andrew Conrad. The couple separated in January 2001.

On January 1, 2007, she married talent agent Roger Fishman. On January 11, 2008, she gave birth to their son. The couple separated in September 2021, and Thorne-Smith filed for divorce in June 2025.

== Filmography ==
=== Film ===
Year	Title	Role	Notes
1986	Welcome to 18	Lindsey	
1986	Lucas	Alise	
1987	Revenge of the Nerds II: Nerds in Paradise	Sunny Carstairs	
1987	Summer School	Pam House	
1990	Side Out	Samantha	
1997	The Lovemaster	Deb	
1998	Chairman of the Board	Natalie Stockwell	
2005	Batman: New Times	Catwoman/Ms. Kitka Karenska	Voice, short film
2006	Whisper of the Heart	Shiho Tsukishima	English dub

=== Television ===
Year	Title	Role	Notes
1986	Fast Times	Stacey Hamilton	7 episodes
1986	The Thanksgiving Promise	Sheryl	Television film
1987	Growing Pains	Photography class student	Episode: "Nude Photos"
1988–1989	Day by Day	Kristin Carlson	33 episodes
1990	L.A. Law	Kimberly Dugan	6 episodes
1990	Anything but Love	Allison Andrews	Episode: "All About Allison"
1992	Jack's Place	Kim Logan	Episode: "Everything Old Is New Again"
1992	Grapevine	Lisa	Episode: "The Lisa and Billy Story"
1992–1997	Melrose Place	Alison Parker	Main Role (seasons 1–5); 165 episodes
1994	Breach of Conduct	Helen Lutz	Television film
1995	Midwest Obsession	Cheryl Ann Davis	Television film
1996	Partners	Danielle	Episode: "The Year of Bob?"
1997	Duckman	Herself	Episode: "Bonfire of the Panties"
1997	Spin City	Danielle Brinkman	Episode: "Starting Over"
1997–2002	Ally McBeal	Georgia Thomas	Main Role (seasons 1–3), Guest star (seasons 4–5); 69 episodes
1999	Partners	Gina Darrin	Episode: "Always..."
1999	Ally	Georgia Thomas	12 episodes
2000	Norm	Rebecca	Episode: "Norm and the Hopeless Cause"
2001–2009	According to Jim	Cheryl	Main Role; 182 episodes
2009	Sorority Wars	Lutie Parker	Television film
2010–2015	Two and a Half Men	Lyndsey McElroy	Recurring (seasons 7–12); 52 episodes
2016	Robot Chicken	Medical Examiner	Voice, episode: "Blackout Window Heatstroke"
2016–2017	Fresh Off the Boat	Anne	2 episodes
2017	Site Unseen: An Emma Fielding Mystery	Emma Fielding	Television film (Hallmark Movies & Mysteries)
2018	Past Malice: An Emma Fielding Mystery	Emma Fielding	Television film (Hallmark Movies & Mysteries)
2019	More Bitter than Death: An Emma Fielding Mystery	Emma Fielding	Television film (Hallmark Movies & Mysteries)
2020	Mom	Sam	Episode: "Beef Baloney Dan and a Sarcastic No"
2024	He Slid Into Her DMs	Leah	Television movie

== Awards and nominations ==
Year	Association	Category	Nominated work	Result
1998	Screen Actors Guild	Outstanding Performance by an Ensemble in a Comedy Series (shared with rest of cast)	Ally McBeal	Nominated
1999	Screen Actors Guild	Outstanding Performance by an Ensemble in a Comedy Series (shared with rest of cast)	Ally McBeal	Won
2000	Screen Actors Guild	Outstanding Performance by an Ensemble in a Comedy Series (shared with rest of cast)	Ally McBeal	Nominated
