= SMS S51 (1915) =

V25-class torpedo boat

History

German Empire
- Name: S51
- Ordered: 1914
- Builder: Schichau-Werke, Elbing
- Launched: 29 April 1915
- Commissioned: 7 September 1915
- Fate: Interned at Scapa Flow 22 November 1918; Scuttled 21 June 1919; Salvaged July 1919; Scrapped 1922

General characteristics
- Displacement: 1,074 t (1,057 long tons)
- Length: 79.6 m (261 ft 2 in)
- Beam: 8.36 m (27 ft 5 in)
- Draft: 3.64 m (11 ft 11 in)
- Propulsion: 3× water-tube boilers; 2× steam turbines; 24,000 metric horsepower (24,000 shp; 18,000 kW)
- Speed: 34.0 knots (63.0 km/h; 39.1 mph)
- Range: 1,270 nmi (2,350 km; 1,460 mi)at 20 knots (37 km/h; 23 mph)
- Complement: 88 officers and sailors
- Armament: 3 × 8.8 cm SK L/45 naval guns; 6 × 500 mm torpedo tubes; 24 mines

SMS S51 (Note: "SMS" stands for "Seiner Majestät Schiff" (transl. His Majesty's Ship)) (Note: The "S" in S51 denoted the shipbuilder who constructed her, in this case Schichau-Werke.) was a V25-class torpedo boat of the Imperial German Navy. Ordered immediately after the outbreak of the First World War, S51 was built by Schichau-Werke, at their Elbing shipyard. She was launched on 29 April 1915 and completed in September that year.

S51 served with the German High Seas Fleet, operating in the North Sea and the English Channel, and took part in the Battle of Jutland on 31 May–1 June 1916, where she was damaged but survived. At the end of the war, S51 was interned at Scapa Flow and was scuttled on 21 June 1919. The ship was quickly salvaged, and was broken up for scrap in 1922.

== Construction and design ==
On 6 August 1914, as a result of the outbreak of the First World War, the Imperial German Navy placed orders for 48 high-seas torpedo-boats, with 18, including S51, to be built by Schichau-Werke, as part of the 1914 mobilisation order. These ships were based on the last torpedo boats ordered before the outbreak of war, the V25-class. S51 was laid down at Schichau's Elbing (now Elbląg in Poland) as yard number 941, was launched on 29 April 1915 and commissioned on 7 September 1915.

S51 was 79.6 metres (261 ft 2 in) long overall and 79.0 metres (259 ft 2 in) at the waterline, with a beam of 8.36 metres (27 ft 5 in) and a draught of 3.64 metres (11 ft 11 in). Displacement was 802 tonnes (789 long tons) normal and 1,074 tonnes (1,057 long tons) deep load. Three oil-fired water-tube boilers fed steam to 2 sets of direct-drive steam turbines rated at 24,000 metric horsepower (24,000 shp; 18,000 kW), giving a speed of 34.0 knots (63.0 km/h; 39.1 mph). 252 tonnes (248 long tons) of fuel oil was carried, giving a range of 1,605 nautical miles (2,972 km; 1,847 mi) at 17 knots (31 km/h; 20 mph) and 1,270 nautical miles (2,350 km; 1,460 mi) at 20 knots (37 km/h; 23 mph).

Armament originally consisted of three 8.8 cm SK L/45 naval guns in single mounts, (Note: SK stood for Schnellfeuerkanone (quick-firing gun).) (Note: In Imperial German Navy gun nomenclature, the L/45 denotes the length of the gun. In this case, the L/45 gun is 45 caliber, meaning that the gun is 45 times as long as it is in diameter.) together with six 50 cm (19.7 in) torpedo tubes with two fixed single tubes forward and 2 twin mounts aft. Up to 24 mines could be carried. The ship had a complement of 85 officers and men.

== Service ==
Between 16 and 18 November 1915, S51, part of the 17th torpedo-boat half-flotilla, was one of 18 torpedo boats that carried out a sortie into the Skagerrak to intercept merchant shipping. On 10 February 1916, S51 took part in a sortie by 25 torpedo boats of the 2nd, 6th and 9th Torpedo-boat Flotillas into the North Sea. The sortie led to an encounter between several German torpedo boats and British minesweepers off the Dogger Bank, which resulted in the British minesweeper Arabis being torpedoed and sunk by ships of the 2nd Flotilla. On 24 April 1916, the German battlecruisers of I Scouting Group and the light cruisers of the II Scouting Group set out from Kiel on a mission to bombard the British East-coast towns of Yarmouth and Lowestoft, with the torpedo boats of the 6th and 9th Torpedo Boat Flotillas as escorts, and S51 as part of the 9th Flotilla. The battleships of the High Seas Fleet were deployed in support, with the hope of destroying isolated elements of the British Forces if they tried to intercept. There was a brief engagement between the German forces and the light cruisers and destroyers of the Harwich Force, which caused the German battlecruisers to break off the bombardment of Lowestoft, but rather than take the chance to destroy the outnumbered British force, the Germans chose to retire.

S51 participated in the Battle of Jutland as part of the 17th Half Flotilla of the 9th Flotilla, which was tasked with supporting the German battlecruisers. During the so-called "run to the south", at about 17:26 CET (16:26 GMT), the 9th Flotilla, including S51, carried out a torpedo attack against the British battlecruisers, but British destroyers launched an attack against the German battlecruiser force, which disrupted the German attack. A shell from S51 hit the British destroyer Nomad in the engine room, disabling the British ship, but an attempt by S51 to torpedo Nomad failed, with the two torpedoes passing under Nomad, having been set to run at a greater depth than the draught of the British destroyer. None of the German torpedoes launched during this attack found their target. Later during the afternoon, at about 19:00 CET, the 9th Flotilla attempted another torpedo attack against British battlecruisers, which was curtailed by poor visibility and an attack by British destroyers, with S51 not launching any torpedoes. From about 20:15 CET (19:15 GMT), S51 took part in a large-scale torpedo attack by the 6th and 9th Torpedo Boat Flotillas on the British fleet in order to cover the outnumbered German battleships' turn away from the British line. The German torpedo boats came under heavy fire from British battleships, with S51 being hit by a single 6-inch (152 mm) shell in the forward stokehold, which knocked out S51's forward steering engine and one boiler, reducing her speed to 21 kn (24 mph; 39 km/h), and wounding three crewmembers. S51 launched a single torpedo at the British battle line, which missed its target. S51 was part of the 9th Torpedo Boat Flotilla during the inconclusive Action of 19 August 1916, when the German High Seas Fleet sailed to cover a sortie of the battlecruisers of the 1st Scouting Group.

In October 1916, the 3rd and 9th Torpedo Boat Flotillas were ordered to reinforce the German naval forces based in Flanders, in order to disrupt the Dover Barrage, a series of anti submarine minefields and nets that attempted to stop U-boats from operating in the English Channel, and to directly attack cross-Channel shipping. The twenty torpedo boats of the two flotillas, including S51, still part of the 17th Half Flotilla of the 9th Flotilla, left Wilhelmshaven on 23 October, reaching Belgium the next day. The 9th Flotilla took part in a large scale raid into the English Channel on the night of 26/27 October 1916, and was assigned the role of attacking Allied shipping while other torpedo boats went after the Dover Barrage, with the 17th half-flotilla, (Note: S36, S51, S52, S60, V79 and V80) including S51, to operate north and west of the Varne Bank. The 17th half-flotilla stopped the British transport The Queen off the Varne, and after The Queen's crew had abandoned ship, S60 sank the transport with a torpedo. On the return journey, the 17th half-flotilla encountered the British destroyer Nubian, and opened fire. A torpedo from S36 badly damaged Nubian. After breaking contact with the immobile Nubian, the 17th half-flotilla then spotted the British destroyer Amazon and hit Amazon twice with gunfire, disabling two boilers and a gun. Other German units sank several drifters and the old destroyer Flirt. The 9th Flotilla continued to operate from Flanders, attacking shipping off the coast of the Netherlands on 1 November. On the night of 23/24 November, S51 took part in a raid by torpedo boats of the 9th Flotilla and the "Z" half-flotilla against the shipping anchorage of The Downs, (Note: V26, V28, V30, S33, S34, S36, S51, S52, V79 and V80 of the 9th Flotilla and V47, V67 and V68 of the "Z" half-flotilla.) but after a brief clash with drifters near the north entrance to The Downs, abandoned attempts to attack shipping, and shelled shore targets. (Note: Margate according to Newbolt, Ramsgate according to Gladisch.) The 9th Flotilla returned to Germany on 30 November, but S51 did not leave with the flotilla, as she and S60 remained in Zeebrugge for repairs to their turbines. On the night of 25/26 January 1917, S51 and S60 took part in a sortie of the 6th Torpedo boat Flotilla and the 1st "Z" half-flotilla towards Southwold. No shipping or British patrol forces were encountered, and the force ended up shelling the town. S51 and S60 returned to Germany on 22 February 1917.

By late April 1917, the torpedo boats of the 9th Torpedo Boat Flotilla had been fitted for minesweeping and their crews trained in that task, and became increasingly dedicated to minesweeping. S51 remained part of the 17th half-flotilla of the 9th Torpedo Boat Flotilla at the end of April 1918, and at the end of the war.

== Fate ==
After the end of the war, in accordance with the requirements of the Armistice of 11 November 1918, S51, along with most of the rest of the German High Seas Fleet, was interned at Scapa Flow in Orkney. S51 was scuttled along with most of the rest of the High Seas Fleet on 21 June 1919 in Gutter Sound, although the scuttling was not fully successful, and the ship grounded off the island of Fara, Orkney. The ship was salvaged in July 1919, sold for scrap at Grangemouth in February–March 1921 and was broken up at Rosyth in 1922.

== Bibliography ==
- Campbell, John (1998). Jutland: An Analysis of the Fighting. London: Conway Maritime Press. ISBN 0-85177-750-3.
- Dodson, Aidan (2019). "Beyond the Kaiser: The IGN's Destroyers and Torpedo Boats After 1918". In Jordan, John (ed.). Warship 2019. Oxford, UK: Osprey Publishing. pp. 129–144. ISBN 978-1-4728-3595-6.
- Fock, Harald (1989). Z-Vor! Internationale Entwicklung und Kriegseinsätze von Zerstörern und Torpedobooten 1914 bis 1939 (in German). Herford, Germany: Koehlers Verlagsgesellschaft mBH. ISBN 3-7822-0207-4.
- Friedman, Norman (2011). Naval Weapons of World War One: Guns, Torpedoes, Mines and ASW Weapons of All Nations: An Illustrated Directory. Barnsley, UK: Seaforth Publishing. ISBN 978-1-84832-100-7.
- Gardiner, Robert; Gray, Randal, eds. (1985). Conway's All The World's Fighting Ships 1906–1921. London: Conway Maritime Press. ISBN 0-85177-245-5.
- Gladisch, Walter (1937). Der Kreig in der Nordsee: Sechter Band: Von Juni 1916 bis Frühjahr 1917. Der Krieg zur See: 1914–1918. Berlin: Verlag von E. S. Mittler und Sohn.
- Gladisch, Walter, ed. (1965). Der Krieg in der Nordsee: Band 7: Vom Sommer 1917 bis zum Kriegsende 1918. Frankfurt: Verlag E.S. Mittler & Sohn.
- Gröner, Erich; Jung, Dieter; Maass, Martin (1983). Die deutschen Kriegsschiffe 1815–1945: Band 2: Torpedoboote, Zerstörer, Schnellboote, Minensuchboote, Minenräumboote (in German). Koblenz: Bernard & Graef Verlag. ISBN 3-7637-4801-6.
- Groos, O. (1924). Der Krieg in der Nordsee: Vierter Band: Von Anfang Februar bis Ende Dezember 1915. Der Krieg zur See: 1914–1918 (in German). Berlin: Verlag von E. S. Mittler und Sohn – via National Library of Estonia.
- Karau, Mark K. (2014). The Naval Flank of the Western Front: The German MarineKorps Flandern 1914–1918. Barnsley, UK: Seaforth Publishing. ISBN 978-1-84832-231-8.
- Massie, Robert K. (2007). Castles of Steel: Britain, Germany and the Winning of the Great War at Sea. London: Vintage Books. ISBN 978-0-099-52378-9.
- Monograph No. 31: Home Waters Part VI: From October 1915 to May 1916 (PDF). Naval Staff Monographs (Historical). Vol. XV. Naval Staff, Training and Staff Duties Division. 1926. Archived from the original (PDF) on 5 October 2023.
- Monograph No. 32: Lowestoft Raid: 24th – 25th April, 1916 (PDF). Naval Staff Monographs (Historical). Vol. XVI. The Naval Staff, Training and Staff Duties Division. 1927. Archived from the original (PDF) on 3 January 2023.
- Monograph No. 33: Home Waters Part VII: From June 1916 to November 1916 (PDF). Naval Staff Monographs (Historical). Vol. XVII. Naval Staff, Training and Staff Duties Division. 1927. Archived from the original (PDF) on 12 August 2023.
- Newbolt, Henry (1928). Naval Operations: Volume IV. History of the Great War. London: Longmans, Green & Co. OCLC 669033099.
- Ruge, F. (1972). Warship Profile 27: SM Torpedo Boat B110. Profile Publications.
- Tarrant, V. E. (1997). Jutland: The German Perspective: A New View of the Great Battle, 31 May 1916. London: Arms & Amour Press. ISBN 1-85409-442-4.
