= SMS S32 (1914) =

History

German Empire
- Name: SMS S32
- Builder: Schichau-Werke, Elbing
- Launched: 28 February 1914
- Completed: 10 September 1914
- Fate: Scuttled 21 June 1919

General characteristics
- Class & type: V25-class torpedo boat
- Displacement: 802 t (789 long tons) design
- Length: 79.6 m (261 ft 2 in) o/a
- Beam: 8.3 m (27 ft 3 in)
- Draught: 2.8 m (9 ft 2 in)
- Installed power: 23,500 PS (23,200 shp; 17,300 kW)
- Propulsion: 3 × boilers; 2 × steam turbines,
- Speed: 33.5 kn (38.6 mph; 62.0 km/h)
- Complement: 83
- Armament: 3× 8.8 cm KL/45 guns; 6× 50 cm (19.7 in) torpedo tubes

SMS S32 (Note: "SMS" stands for "Seiner Majestät Schiff" (transl. His Majesty's Ship)) (Note: The "S" in S32 denoted the shipbuilder who constructed her.) was a V25-class large torpedo boat of the Imperial German Navy that served during the First World War. She was built by the Schichau-Werke shipyard in Elbing, East Prussia, being launched on 28 February 1914 and was completed in September that year.

S32 survived the war, and was scuttled at Scapa Flow in 1919.

== Construction and design ==
In 1913, the Imperial German Navy decided to build larger and more seaworthy torpedo boats in place of the smaller V1-class torpedo boats that had been ordered in 1911 and 1912, which had not proved successful. The new, larger, designs would, as well as being more seaworthy, carry a heavier armament and would be oil-fueled only, rather than use the mix of oil- and coal-fueled boilers that German torpedo boats had used up to then. As was normal, orders were placed for a flotilla of 12 torpedo boats in the 1913 fiscal year, with 6 each ordered from AG Vulcan (V25–V30) and Schichau-Werke (S31–S36). The two groups of torpedo boats were of basically similar layout but differed in detailed design.

The 1913 Schichau torpedo boats were 79.6 metres (261 ft 2 in) long overall and 79.0 metres (259 ft 2 in) at the waterline, with a beam of 8.3 metres (27 ft 3 in) and a draught of 2.8 metres (9 ft 2 in). displacement was 802 tonnes (789 long tons) design and 971 tonnes (956 long tons) deep load.

Three oil-fired water-tube boilers fed steam at 18.5 standard atmospheres (272 psi; 1,870 kPa) at two sets of Schichau direct-drive steam turbines. The machinery was rated at 23,500 shaft horsepower (17,500 kW) and gave a design speed of 33.5 knots (38.6 mph; 62.0 km/h). 220 t of oil was carried, giving a range of 1,100 nautical miles (1,300 mi; 2,000 km) at 20 knots (23 mph; 37 km/h).

The ship was armed with three 8.8 cm (3.4 in) L/45 guns and six 50 cm (19.7 in) torpedo tubes, with two single tubes forward and two twin tubes aft of the ship's funnels, with the twin tubes angled out by 15 degrees. Up to 24 mines could be carried. The ship had a crew of 83 officers and men.

S32, yard number 907, was launched on 28 February 1914 and was completed on 10 September that year.

== Service ==
On 12 February 1915, five torpedo boats of the 9th Torpedo Boat Flotilla, including S32, were deployed to screen minesweeping operations near the Amrum Bank in the North Sea. When V25 did not return from this operation, a search found wreckage north of Helgoland. At the time it was believed that she had been sunk by a British submarine, with S32 claiming to have sighted a periscope, but in fact, no British submarines were in the vicinity, and V25 had probably been sunk by a British mine. All 79 of her crew were lost. On 23 March 1915, S32 took part in operations in the Baltic Sea off the coast of East Prussia and Lithuania, supporting a bombardment by German cruisers north of Memel. In August 1915, S32 took part in the Battle of the Gulf of Riga, an attempt by German forces, supported by the High Seas Fleet, to enter the Gulf of Riga, destroy Russian naval forces in the Gulf and to mine the northern entrances to the Gulf in order to prevent Russian reinforcement. The attempt failed with Germany losing the torpedo boats S31 and V99 and the minesweeper T46, while failing to destroy any major Russian warships or lay the planned minefield. On 20 August, in one of the last actions of the battle, S32 took part in an attack on Pernau, with blockships being used to block the entrance to the harbour.

S32 took part in the Battle of Jutland on 31 May–1 June 1916, sailing as part of the 1st Half-Flotilla of the 1st Torpedo Boat Flotilla, but later in the battle transferring to the 3rd Torpedo Boat Flotilla. S32, operating on the starboard beam of the battleship König, was hit by splinters from shells fired by British battleships towards the end of the "run to the north". The 3rd Torpedo Boat Flotilla launched an unsuccessful torpedo attack against British Battlecruisers at about 18:37, with S32 firing four torpedoes (all of which missed), while also exchanging fire with the crippled British destroyer HMS Shark before and after the attack and was hit on the forecastle by a shell from Shark. Later on, the Germans launched a series of torpedo boat attacks against the British battle line to cover the escape of the German battleships, with S32 taking part in this attack and launching a single torpedo. At about 23:30, the British 11th Destroyer Flotilla encountered German warships, and the destroyer Tipperary flashed a challenge to them to determine if they were British or German. The Germans, including S32 responded with heavy gunfire, and Tipperary was badly damaged and later sunk. S32 was hit by two British 4-inch (102 mm) shells, one of which severed a steam-pipe in the aft boiler room, temporarily immobilising S32, although she later restored power and safely reached port. Three of S32's crew were killed and one wounded during the battle.

S32 was part of the 1st Torpedo Boat Flotilla during the inconclusive Action of 19 August 1916, when the German High Seas Fleet sailed to cover a sortie of the battlecruisers of the 1st Scouting Group.

== Scuttling ==
After the end of hostilities, S32 was interned at Scapa Flow and was scuttled along with most of the rest of the High Seas Fleet on 21 June 1919 in Gutter Sound. She was raised by Cox and Danks on 19 June 1925 and sold for scrap.
