= The Lovemaster (film) =

- Directed by: Michael Goldberg
- Written by: Craig Shoemaker; Michael Goldberg
- Starring: Craig Shoemaker; Courtney Thorne-Smith; George Wendt; Richard Singer
- Release date: 1997
- Country: United States
- Language: English

The Lovemaster is a 1997 American comedy film directed by Michael Goldberg and starring Craig Shoemaker, Courtney Thorne-Smith, George Wendt and Richard Singer.

== Plot ==
A stand-up comic performs at a comedy club and rants about his personal life and discusses, via fantasy flashbacks, his many personalities and anxieties.

== Cast ==
- George Wendt as the therapist
- Craig Shoemaker as Craig
- Courtney Thorne-Smith as Deb
- Farrah Fawcett as Craig's Dream Date
