= Craig Shoemaker =

American stand-up comedian

- Born: November 15, 1964 (age 61); Philadelphia, Pennsylvania, U.S.
- Spouse(s): Nancy Allen (m. 1992; div. 1995); Carolyn Ann Clark (m. 1998; div. 2005); Mika Sogawa (m. 2008; div. 2023)
- Children: 4

Comedy career
- Years active: 1980–present
- Medium: Stand-up, television, film, books
- Genre: Observational comedy
- Subjects: Impressions, everyday life, marriage, parenting
- Website: www.craigshoemaker.com

Craig Shoemaker (born November 15, 1964) is an American stand up comedian, actor, author, writer and producer. He was named Comedian of the Year at The American Comedy Awards on ABC and garnered two NATAS Emmy awards. He is best known for his 90-minute stand-up special, Daditude.

== Life and career ==
Craig was born in Mount Airy and grew up in the Philadelphia area, He graduated from Springfield Township High School. He attended Temple University, financing his college years by working as a bartender and being an emcee for comedy shows. He also attended California University of Pennsylvania. Shoemaker received a Bachelor of Arts degree with majors in Radio, television and film.

"Shoe's" stage, film and TV acting credits are extensive and wide ranging. Shoemaker was Earvin "Magic" Johnson's sidekick for three episodes of the ill-fated late nite talk show, The Magic Hour before being fired during a commercial break. Recently, he co-starred as Bandit in the critically acclaimed movie Middle Man. He had a recurring character named Wilson Gromling, the head of Pawnee's Liberty or Die Party, on NBC's Parks & Recreation, and a five episode run on The Bold & The Beautiful. He also played the snooty film professor in the horror sequel Scream 2. As a writer, Craig joined the writing staff for season two of the iconic sitcom reboot Fuller House. His best-selling book, LoveMaster'd: A Digital Journey to Love & Happiness, has been critically acclaimed by the likes of Whoopi Goldberg and Dr. Drew Pinsky, inspiring readers worldwide in managing through personal difficulties.

In 2003, he founded LaughterHeals.org, a nonprofit group dedicated to using laughter as a healing modality. Previously, Shoemaker hosted a weekly podcast and webcast, "Laugh It Off," and currently tours the world speaking about the healing powers of laughter. Currently they are in preproduction on the documentary Live 2 Laugh, with Shoemaker serving as producer and writer.

As a producer, Craig has been a creative force in several independent features and television shows. He wrote, produced and starred in the cult classic Totally Baked, and his movie The LoveMaster was honored at the Los Angeles Independent Film Festival. Currently, Craig is producing a number of feature films with European partners, including the soon-to-be-released Working with Warhol and two projects currently in production, Breakfast with Charly and The Boogeyman Chronicles. He was hired as lead writer on the animated show Bad Zoo, and along with animator David Feiss is developing two other cartoons, From the Crib and ChickenShip. He is also performing stand up with Bill Bellamy on their joint project, the "Make America Laugh Again Tour," and just started the production company Really Big Shoe Media, with a current slate of over 25 television and film projects in varying genres.

== Personal life ==
Shoemaker was first married to actress Nancy Allen in September 1992. They divorced in 1995. He next married actress Carolyn Ann Clark in February 1998. The couple had two sons, Justin (b. July 25, 1998) and Jared (b. July 1, 2004), though they divorced in 2005.

Craig married to Mika Sogawa, in Maui on June 21, 2008. They had a son, Jackson Kai (b. September 8, 2009), and a daughter, Chloe Akeila (b. January 14, 2014). They divorced in 2023.

On May 8, 2010, Craig received an honorary doctorate in Humanities/Humanistic Studies from California University of Pennsylvania.

== Film ==
Year	Title	Role	Notes
1997	The Lovemaster		
1997	Scream 2	Artsy Teacher	
1998	Safe House	Stuart Bittenbinder	
1998	Pleasantville		
2006	Comic Relief		
2007	Totally Baked: A Pot-u-Mentary		
2008	Dark Honeymoon	Pete	
2008	Craig Shoemaker: The Lovemaster... Unzipped		
2012	Should've Been Romeo		
2016	Middle Man	Bandit	

== Select television series ==
Year	Title	Role	Notes
1984	Simon & Simon		
1987	The Bronx Zoo (TV series)		
1989	Studio 5-B		
1990	Night Court		
1990	Matlock		
1990	Neon Rider		
1990-1993	Murder, She Wrote		
1991	FBI: The Untold Stories		
1991	Parker Lewis Can't Lose		
1992	Walter & Emily		
1992	Room for Two (American TV series)		
1992	Tales from the Crypt (TV series)		
1993	The Fresh Prince of Bel-Air	Louis	1 episode
1993	Coach (TV series)	Ferguson	1 episode
1993	Street Justice	Ben	1 episode
1996	Roseanne	Phil	1 episode
1997	Cow and Chicken	Boy (voice)	1 episode
1997-1999	I Am Weasel		
1998	The Magic Hour	Self/Sidekick	3 episodes
1998	My Generation (Host)		
2001	The Hughleys		
2001	Family Law		
2002-2004	Teamo Supremo	General Incompetence	Episode: "State of Chaos!"
2008	Comedy Special: Unzipped (Comedy Central)		
2012	Comedy Special: Daditude (Netflix)		
2013	Parks and Recreation		Twice recurring role
2013	The Bold and the Beautiful		
Various	The View		
2014	Awkward		
2018	Enlightened Up		
2019	Comedy Kitchen		
2021-	WolfPac		

== Awards ==
Year	Platform	Award
2006	XM Nation Awards	Big Schtick Award for Most Popular Routine or Joke
2004	Communicator Crystal Awards	"Shoe Sticker Hook-Up" from the Craig Shoemaker Shoe
2007	Elevate Film Festival	Best Supporting Actor
1997	American Comedy Awards	Funniest Male Stand-Up Comic
1986	Mid-Atlantic Emmy Awards	Craig Shoemaker (Twice Winner)

== Books ==
- Shoemaker, Craig; Kushner (illustrator), Sarah; Novak, Robert; Bennett, Marc (2002). What You Have Now ... What Your Daddy Had Then. Bennett/Novak and Company, Inc. ISBN 978-0971345409.
- Shoemaker, Craig; Kushner (illustrator), Sarah (2004). What You Have Now ... What Your Mommy Had Then. Bennett/Novak and Company, Inc. ISBN 978-0971345423.
- Shoemaker, Craig (2014). Lovemaster'd: A Digital Journey to Love and Happiness. Victoria, BC: FriesenPress. ISBN 978-1-4602-4459-3.
