= S32 (company) =

American venture capital firm

- Formerly: Section 32
- Type: Private
- Industry: Venture Capital
- Founder: Bill Maris
- Headquarters: Palo Alto, United States
- Key people: Bill Maris (Founder) Andy Harrison (CEO & General Partner); Andy Conrad (General Partner) Michael Pellini, MD (General Partner)
- Services: Venture funding
- Website: s32.com

S32 (formerly Section 32) is a California-based venture fund founded by Google Ventures founder, Bill Maris. S32 funds technology companies at all stages and has over $3 billion under management.

== History ==
S32 was founded by the Google Ventures founder, Bill Maris. Bill Maris' background is in technology and neuroscience, and he retired from Google Ventures (later GV) after he declared "mission accomplished." He founded S32 to invest in frontier technology.

The fund aimed to raise $100 million however, citing a strong interest, the first fund raise was $160 million, and the firm now has over $3 billion under management.

In December 2017, Michael Pellini, the former CEO and standing Chairman of Foundation Medicine joined S32 as a Managing Partner.

In early 2019, Section 32 announced that it had raised nearly $200M for a second fund.

In 2020, S32 announced it was raising $350M for its third fund.

In March 2021, Andy Harrison joined S32 as a Managing Partner. He previously held executive leadership roles at Alphabet, including Verily Life Sciences (previously Google Life Sciences) and X (previously GoogleX). S32 has notably invested in Coinbase, Crowdstrike, Thrive, Vir, Relay, and Cohere.

In November 2021, S32 announced that it raised its fourth fund, Fund 4, from new and existing institutional investors spanning philanthropic, nonprofit and educational organizations, and foundations. The fund was more than double the size of its previous fund and invested in several companies, including quantum and AI application company, SandboxAQ, which spun out of Google in 2022, and synthetic data startup, Gretel Labs.

In 2023, S32 raised a $525M Fund 5 to invest in software-driven businesses in tech and healthcare that improve the human condition and named Andy Harrison as CEO of the firm.

In February 2024, S32 announced the appointment of Andy Conrad as a General Partner. Conrad, known for his leadership in technology and advanced data science, previously founded and served as the CEO and Executive Chairman of Verily Life Sciences at Alphabet (Google).

S32 is notable for investing in 8090, Basecamp Research, Black Forest Labs, Cohere, Databricks, Deel, Ema, Endor Labs, Gusto, Humans&, Inceptive, Infleqtion, Legora, Neuralink, NewLimit, Ohalo, Phaidra, Physical Intelligence, Raya, SandboxAQ, and Scale AI among others.
