= Bill Maris =

American tech entrepreneur

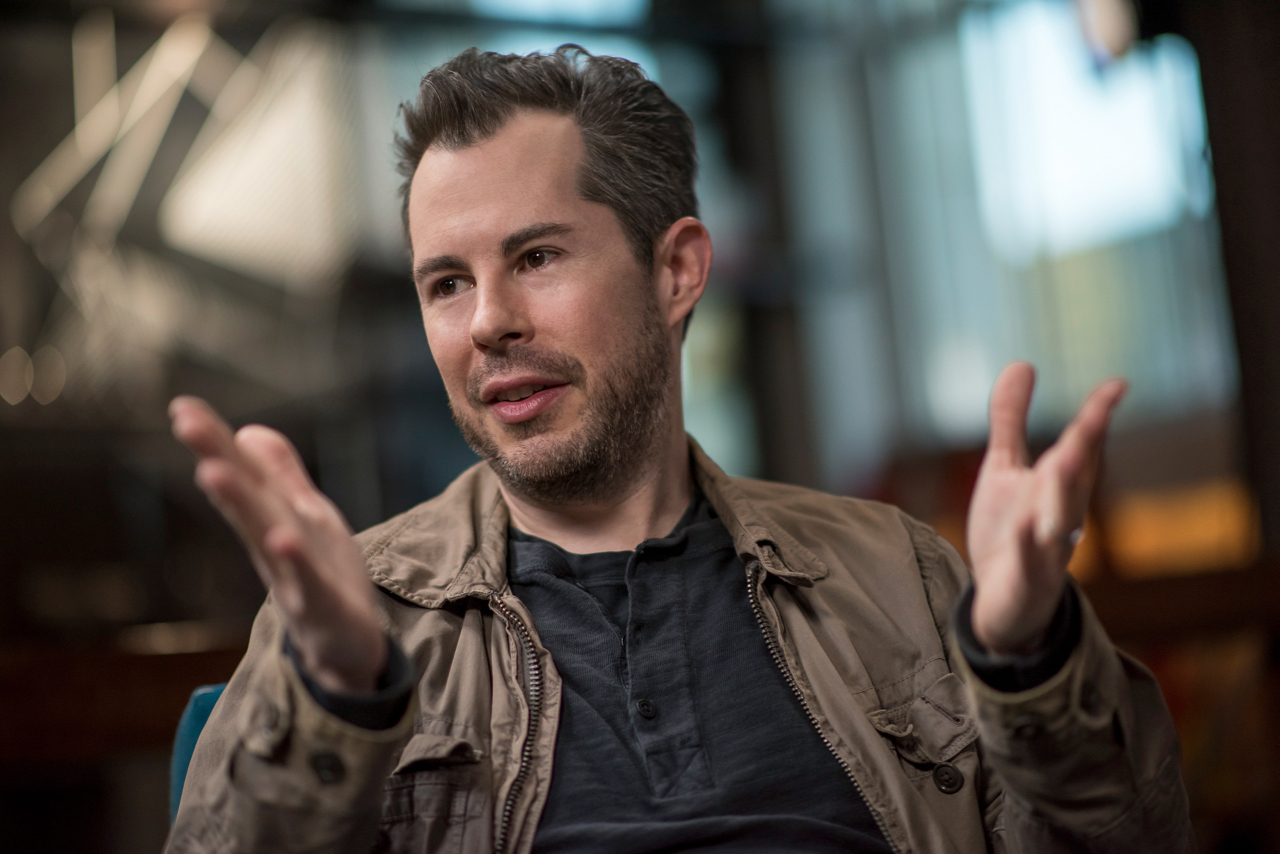
- Maris in 2016
- Born: William J. Maris
- Education: Middlebury College
- Known for: Founder, S32; Founder, Google Ventures (GV); Founder, Calico; VP of Special Projects at Google; Founder, Burlee.com (now part of Web.com)

William J. Maris is an American entrepreneur and venture capitalist focused on technology and the life sciences. Bill Maris's investments have to date resulted in over 150 exits and more than 50 companies that have grown to over $1B in value, including: Nest, Uber, Crowdstrike, Coinbase, 23andMe, Flatiron Health (acquired by Roche), Foundation Medicine (acquired by Roche), The Climate Corporation, Vir, and Auris (acquired by Johnson & Johnson). He is the founder and first CEO of Google Ventures (GV) and also served as VP of Special Projects at Google/Alphabet. He is the creator of Google's Calico project, a company created to treat aging as a disease, and cure it. He is the founder of early web hosting pioneer Burlee.com, now part of Web.com, and the founder of S32, a California-based venture fund focused on frontier technology.

== Education and early career ==
Maris graduated with highest honors with a degree in neuroscience from Middlebury College.

Maris's background includes research at the Duke University Medical Center Department of Neurobiology. Maris began his career as a biotechnology and healthcare portfolio manager for Swedish investment firm Investor AB. In 1997, Maris founded one of the first Web hosting companies, Burlee.com, and built the company's original computing, network and technological infrastructure after teaching himself to code from books purchased at the local Barnes & Noble. Burlee was subsequently acquired by Interland, Inc. and renamed Web.com. Burlee.com was merged with Interland in 2002. Maris remained with the company until 2003.

== Career ==
In the mid-2000s, Maris partnered with entrepreneur David Green to transfer a novel hydrophobic acrylic lens to Aurolab to cure cataract blindness in the developing world, where it has been used in more than 30 million patients.

Maris founded GV, formerly Google Ventures, in 2008 as the venture capital investment arm of Google. He was responsible for the fund's strategy and management, and oversaw $3.0 billion in investments in technology and the life sciences. Bill was also Google's Vice President of Special Projects and head of Google for Startups.

While at GV, Bill managed $2.5B and made 400+ investments in companies including Nest, Uber, Flatiron Health, Robinhood, Cloudera, Carbon 3D, Slack, Duo, The Climate Corporation, Impossible Foods, Aurora, Jet, and 23andme. His investments resulted in more than 20 IPO's, 100+ mergers and acquisitions, and includes more than 40 companies whose valuations have exceeded $1B.

Maris founded Calico, a company whose mission is to understand and influence the genetic basis of aging. Google funded the company after Maris pitched the board of directors.

In a 2015 interview, Maris stated that health care breakthroughs can significantly improve the quality and duration of human lifespan across the globe, and that he is looking to invest in promising biotechnology companies.

Maris left Google Ventures on August 12, 2016, declaring "mission accomplished."

In 2017, Maris founded S32, a California-based venture fund with approximately $2 billion under management.

== Personal life ==
In 2014, Maris married singer/songwriter Tristan Prettyman at Kruger National Park in South Africa. On February 17, 2015, it was announced on social media that they were expecting their first child. Their son Kylo Evergreen Maris was born on August 26, 2015. Maris filed for divorce from Prettyman on April 20, 2018.
