= GV (company) =

Venture capital unit of Alphabet Inc

GV Management Company, L.L.C.
- Formerly: Google Ventures (2010–2015)
- Type: Subsidiary
- Industry: Venture capital
- Founded: March 31, 2010; 16 years ago
- Founder: Bill Maris (founding CEO)
- Headquarters: Mountain View, California; San Francisco, California; New York City, New York; Cambridge, Massachusetts; London, England
- Key people: David Krane (CEO)
- Products: Investments
- Total assets: approximately $10 billion
- Owner: Google (2010-2015); Alphabet Inc. (2015-present)
- Website: www.gv.com

GV Management Company, L.L.C. is a venture capital investment arm of Alphabet Inc., founded by Bill Maris, that provides seed, venture, and growth stage funding to technology companies. Founded as Google Ventures in 2009, the firm has operated independently of Google, Alphabet's search and advertising division, since 2015. GV invests in startup companies in a variety of fields ranging from the Internet, software, and hardware to life science, healthcare, artificial intelligence, transportation, cyber security and agriculture.

== History ==
Logo when known as Google Ventures (2009–2015)

The group was founded as Google Ventures on March 31, 2009, with an initial $100 million capital commitment, by Bill Maris who also became its first CEO. In 2012, that commitment was raised to $300 million annually, and the fund has $2 billion under management. In 2014, the group announced $125 million to invest in promising European startups, with the European operations led by Tom Hulme since 2014.

By 2014, it had invested in companies such as Shape Security. In December 2015, the company was renamed GV and introduced a new logo.

As of 2016, GV has been less active as a seed investor, instead shifting its attention to more mature companies.

In 2020, GV promoted Terri Burns from principal to the firm’s first black female partner. Since 2023, GV has had a focus on investing in AI native startups led by Michael McBride who joined from Gitlab and has invested in startups including Vercel, Lightmatter, Harvey, OpenEvidence, Synthesia and Attio. As of 2026, GV Europe reported that approximately 80% of its new investments were in AI or AI-native companies. It had invested more than $1 billion in European startups, with notable investments including Neuralink and Q.ai, the latter of which was acquired by Apple.

In 2026, GV participated as an existing investor in Stipple Bio's oversubscribed $100 million Series A financing, a precision oncology company focused on developing targeted cancer therapies.

== Structure ==
In 2013, GV developed an intensive, five-day design process, called a Design Sprint, which helps startups solve problems quickly. In addition, GV provides portfolio companies with access to operational help after making a financial investment. Full-time partners at GV work with portfolio companies on design and product management, marketing, engineering, and recruiting.

== See also ==
- List of venture capital firms
- CapitalG
