= Digilant =

Marketing technology company

- Industry: Digital Advertising and Marketing
- Predecessor: AdNetik
- Founded: (2009)
- Headquarters: Boston, Massachusetts
- Number of locations: 11
- Key people: Raquel Rosenthal (CEO); Colin Brown (COO); Todd Heger (CRO)
- Parent: ispDigital
- Website: digilant.com

Digilant (formerly AdNetik) is a marketing technology company that offers a platform designed to support programmatic media buying. Digilant is headquartered in the Boston, MA, with additional offices in Brazil, Colombia, Mexico and the European Union.

== History ==
Founded in 2009 as Adnetik with funding from the Barcelona-based Rodes family, the company rebranded as Digilant in July 2012 to distance itself from its origins as part of Havas. In March 2014 founding CEO, Edward Montes, left to become chief revenue officer at DataXu. In July 2014, Digilant was reorganized under a new parent company, ispDigital, alongside two sister companies, Acceso and Antevenio, offering compatible services, and under a new CEO, Don Epperson.

== Products and services ==
Digilant's products and services are designed to assist marketers in uncovering insights about their online audience. Digilant products are available, as managed services or through a self-service interface. Digilant is a media buying platform that combines data management from proprietary and third-party sources with real-time bidding technology to distribute display, video and mobile ads across ad exchanges, ad networks, publisher sites, video exchanges, and mobile exchanges. Digilant's platform is connected to third-party ad and video exchanges including: adap.tv, adbrite, Google DoubleClick, AppNexus, OpenX, Yahoo Ad Exchange, Rubicon Project and Improve Digital.

== Awards ==
- January 2011—Digilant CEO, Edward Montes, was awarded the Latino Trendsetter Award by LatinTRENDS Magazine.
- November 2011—Digilant (as Adnetik) received the Media Owner Award from the Institute of Practitioners in Advertising in London for Most Effective Online Campaign.
- February 2012—Digilant (as Adnetik) Adnamed AlwaysOn Top 100 private companies.
- July 2013—Digilant named AlwaysOn Global 250.

== See also ==
- BlueKai
- Ad exchange
