= Smaato =

- Company type: Subsidiary
- Industry: Ad Tech
- Founded: 2005
- Headquarters: New York, New York, U.S.
- Key people: Sameer Sondhi (CEO)
- Services: RTB, Online advertising, Supply-Side Platform, Mobile Advertising
- Parent: Verve (formerly known as Verve Group)
- Website: smaato.com

Smaato (now part of Verve) is a platform for digital advertising technology. Smaato was acquired by Verve in 2021 and was rebranded as Verve’s Brand+ Marketplace in 2024.

== History ==
Smaato was founded in 2005 by Ragnar Kruse and Petra Vorsteher. The Smaato Publisher Platform (SPX), a comprehensive publisher ad server, was launched by the company in 2015. The next year, Smaato was picked by Google and incorporated into the AdMob and DoubleClick for Publishers platforms, through SDK-less mediation. Later in 2016, Smaato further developed its products for the demand side of mobile advertising with the Smaato Demand Platform (SDX).

== Acquisitions ==
In 2016, Beijing-based Spearhead Integrated Marketing Communication Group acquired Smaato for $148 million.

In 2018, the company collaborated with Amazon Publisher Services (APS) to give demand partners within the app the ability to access Amazon's Transparent Ad Marketplace inventory.

In July 2021, Smaato was acquired by Verve for nearly $170 million. Smaato was later rebranded as Verve’s Brand+ Marketplace in September 2024.

== See also ==
- Rakuten Advertising
- Supply-side platform
