= RTB House =

Polish online advertising company

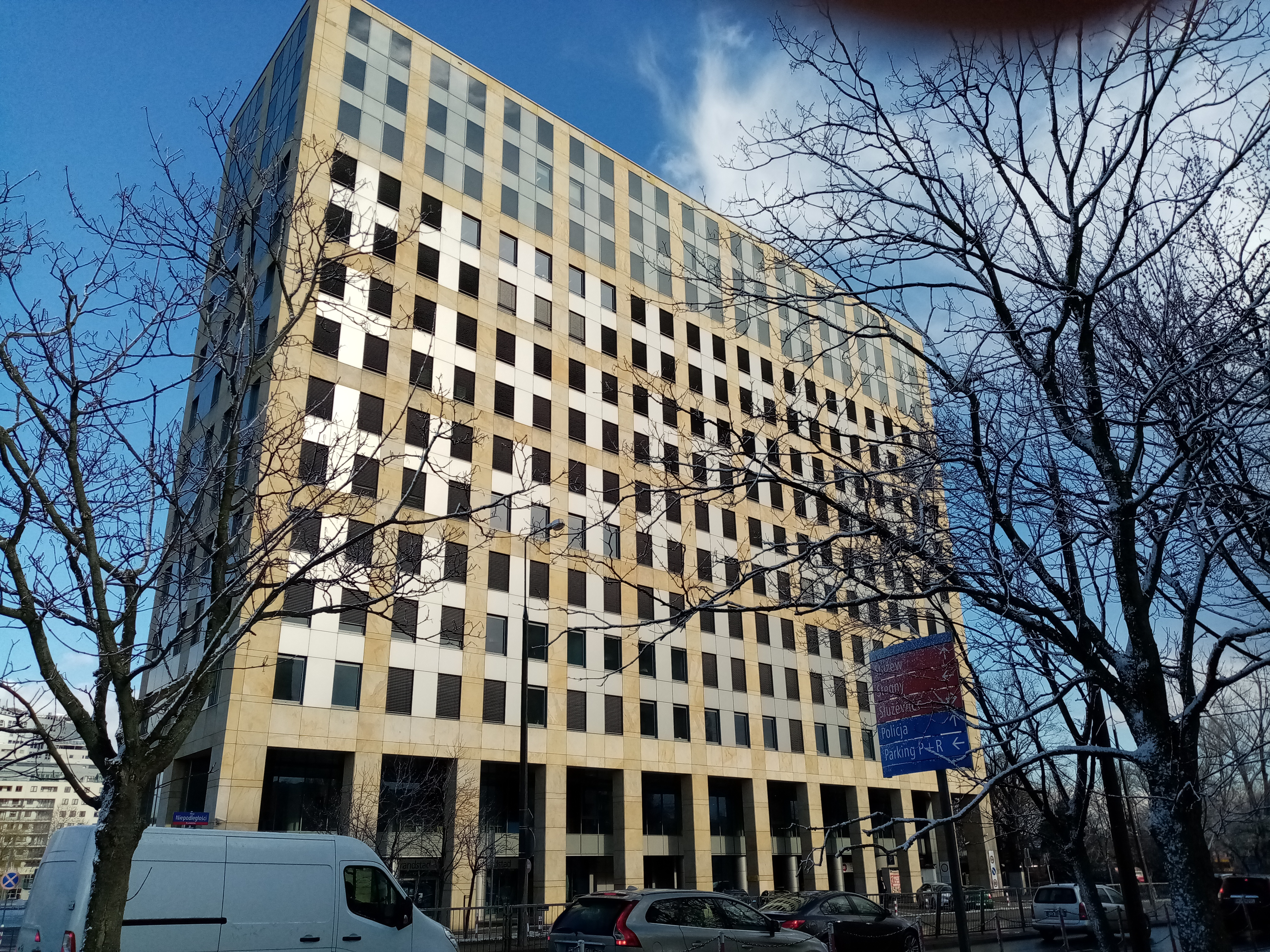
- RTB House headquarters in Warsaw
- Type: Joint-stock company
- Industry: Online advertising; Targeted advertising; Software development; Advertising management; Advertising research
- Predecessor: AdPilot
- Founded: May 15, 2013; 13 years ago
- Founder: Paweł Chodaczek; Robert Dyczkowski; Bartłomiej Romański; Daniel Surmacz
- Headquarters: ul. Złota 61/101, Warsaw, Poland
- Number of locations: 30 offices (2023)
- Area served: Worldwide
- Key people: Robert Dyczkowski; Daniel Surmacz; Aleksander Baryś; Michael Lamb; Wojciech Głowacki; Łukasz Włodarczyk; Krzysztof Słowik
- Products: Social Banners; Snippet Ads; Context AI; PrimeAudience
- Services: Digital display advertising; Personalized marketing; Real-time bidding; Retargeting; Targeted advertising; Audience measurement
- Revenue: ▲€408.59 M (2022)
- Number of employees: ▲1,254 (2022)
- Subsidiaries: WhitePress; NapoleonCat; SEM House; Adlook
- Website: rtbhouse.com

RTB House is a Polish advertising technology company that develops a demand-side platform (DSP) powered by proprietary deep learning algorithms. The company provides targeted marketing solutions for brands, supporting conversion optimization, customer acquisition, and user engagement across the purchase funnel.

Founded in 2012 and headquartered in Warsaw, Poland, RTB House operates in over 90 markets and employs more than 1,500 people across 30+ offices worldwide. The company is private-by-design and provides first-party data advertising services.

Since 2018, the company has been featured in seven consecutive editions of the “FT1000”, the Financial Times and Statista's list of the fastest-growing companies in Europe.

== History ==
=== Founding ===
In 2012, an online marketing agency AdPilot, established by entrepreneur Paweł Chodaczek, was joined by capital market developer Robert Dyczkowski, digital marketing engineer Bartłomiej Romański, and social networks entrepreneur Daniel Surmacz.

Dyczkowski and Romański created a software for selling ads in the RTB model, where each pageview is auctioned, and the winner's ad is immediately displayed on the publisher's website, on the provided advertising space. The software included a DSP and algorithms that enabled real-time participation in advertising space auctions, as well as tools for optimization, recommendations, and dynamic banner ad design.

In May 2013, Chodaczek (leading investor), together with Dyczkowski (executive president), Romański (technical director), and Surmacz (operations director) founded a technology agency dubbed RTB House. For the initial capital, the founders contributed PLN 1.5 million (€0.35 million).

In 2020, 90 percent of RTB House's revenues came from outside Poland, and the company ran 2,000 advertising campaigns in over 70 markets. At that time, Forbes listed it as the 10th largest Polish private investor abroad.

In 2026, the company introduced rtb.com, a self-serve retargeting advertising platform designed for small and midsize ecommerce brands.

=== Betting on real-time bidding ===
The proprietary DSP built by Romański to purchase and optimize online advertising in the real-time bidding model was one of the first tools in the world to utilize the auction system for buying banner impressions on websites and web portals, where ad exchange transactions occur in milliseconds. Banner ads emitted in the tool, through personalized retargeting, are displayed in local and global advertising networks, including the Google Display Network.

The company bases the appropriate display of advertising space on a retargeting model (via programmatic advertising), selecting ads based on user behavior patterns. A user’s lack of purchase decision on the store's website is used on subsequently visited websites to attract the user back to the store. The mechanism is controlled by artificial intelligence (AI).

Since 2013, RTB House has expanded its activities internationally. Within its first year, the company began sales in 33 European markets, including the UK and Ireland. In 2014, it achieved a turnover of €5 million. The company reached PLN 23 million in revenue and over PLN 1 million in profit. By the end of 2016, RTB House opened branches in Asia, Africa, and Latin America. The number of employees increased to 160.

=== Leaning toward deep learning ===
In 2017, RTB House's retargeting was fully based on deep learning algorithms across all its products.

At the time, the company released a paper explaining how a long short-term memory (LSTM) neural network could be used to describe a user of a particular website without human intervention, building an understanding of a user without requiring them to click on an advert.

Throughout 2018, RTB House expanded in Europe, Australia, and Asia, followed by subsequent offices in the US. The company's revenue was €99.89 million. It had over 300 employees.

In 2019, the company changed its business model by increasing its role as a development supporter and technology supplier for subsidiaries. A private equity fund Cinven, bought a package of shares of RTB House from its founders, to further internationalize the company, given Cinven’s presence in the United States, and to continue investing in RTB House’s technology.

=== Cookie-limited advertising ===
In late 2021, RTB House released a contextual targeting feature, ContextAI. It scans 1.5 million articles per hour, enabling the creation of audiences interested in a given topic.

In late 2023, the company launched a content-targeting generative AI tool based on generative pre-trained transformer (GPT) algorithms.

== Mergers and acquisitions ==
In 2021, RTB House acquired a Polish content-marketing platform, WhitePress, from its founders, a technology-focused investment fund Dirlango, and a CEE private-equity fund Innova Capital. Following the acquisition, WhitePress' revenues increased by 68 percent, to PLN 48.71 million. In late 2021, RTB House also invested in a Polish SaaS social-media management platform NapoleonCat.

In 2022, WhitePress was merged with a Polish startup, Senuto, specialized in SEO, big data, and web analytics, with a venture fund investment of over PLN 8 million, and combined it with the previously purchased WhitePress. Senuto made its platform available in five European markets.

Also in 2022, RTB House launched a media buying startup, Adlook, that focuses on advertising for CPG brands. In 2023, a subsidiary search engine marketing agency, SEM House, was launched.

== Technology ==
RTB House’s technological facilities, along with the R&D department, are located in Poland. The retargeting tool created for a new analytical model was based on proprietary deep learning algorithms that predict users’ behavior and interests, thereby precisely segmenting customers’ profiles.

The technology is based on mathematical structures inspired by the biological activity of neurons in the human brain. Its algorithms collect and interpret not only data on the click-through rate (CTR) of individual ads but also take into account information on how offers are viewed, categories displayed, transaction finalization method, and preferred product search tactics. All variables are analyzed automatically, without human intervention.

In 2017, the company implemented deep learning algorithms in all its mechanisms. The personalized retargeting mechanism combines self-learning algorithms based on AI with the image recognition function. They enable an accurate estimation of the CTR indicator. This translates into the ability to more accurately predict whether a user will click on an ad, resulting in a higher return on investment (ROI) for clients.

The company’s ad platform can identify the exact position of each user within the purchase funnel – detecting if they are in the awareness, consideration, or conversion stage – and recommend a specific and personalized approach for each type of user.

== Research and development ==
In 2018, RTB House opened a research division AI Marketing Lab, for a yearly budget of $5 million, to research and develop AdTech services for publishers and advertisers – an internal unit that will conduct research and development across a broad marketing area. Separate from the main R&D department, the new division focused on creating an environment for inventing and developing new AdTech services.

In 2019, RTB House launched the Creatives Lab, a team focused on improving the effectiveness of graphic design by incorporating human input into generated campaign visuals.

Since 2021, RTB House has collaborated with the ad measurement and marketing suite Oracle Moat Measurement to provide insights into campaign performance. Oracle Moat’s advertisement analysis tools were integrated into RTB House's deep learning-based advertising platform, which opened the opportunity for more precise non-cookie metrics.

=== Participation in the Privacy Sandbox ===
Since January 2020, RTB House has worked to make its platform compatible with the assumptions of the Privacy Sandbox initiative, led by Google, which aimed to establish conditions for the online advertising market without the use of cookies. In early 2021, the company was the first demand-side platform to successfully test and use the simulation of the proposal codenamed FLEDGE (First Locally-Executed Decision over Groups Experiment), developed as an alternative to third-party cookies. It was executed via on-device ad auctions in a tool that served remarketing ads to custom audiences without requiring cross-site tracking of individuals.

Since late 2022, RTB House has been experimenting with anonymous targeting through the FLEDGE API. It enables on-device auctions by the browser to choose relevant ads from websites the user has previously visited.

The company published a white paper detailing the results of its early experiments with FLEDGE. The publication highlighted that low industry participation remained a roadblock for the Privacy Sandbox and that certain technical steps would need to be taken before it could be adopted as an industry standard. In April 2023, Google renamed FLEDGE to Protected Audience API. In June 2023, RTB House launched the first advertising network that uses the Protected Audience API.

== Awards and accolades ==
Between 2018 and 2024, RTB House was featured on the Financial Times and Statista's "FT1000" list, as one of the fastest-growing companies in Europe. In 2018, it was ranked 8th among “the fastest growing technology companies in Europe.”

In 2018, in the Deloitte Technology Fast 50 Central Europe ranking, RTB House was in the main category “The Fast 50,” and it was ranked 32nd fastest developing tech company in the region. In 2019, RTB House ranked 37th in the ranking, while reaching revenue growth of 523 percent from 2015 to 2018.

At the International Business Awards competition, RTB House won several Stevie Awards, including gold for the "Innovation of the Year – Business Products Industries" (2019), and gold for the "Marketing/Public Relations Solution" (2020).

In 2018, RTB House won the Big Innovation Award from the international group of experts at the Business Intelligence Group for implementing deep learning that improved the effectiveness of advertising campaigns. The company won the AIconics Award from the international AI Community, for the Best Application of Artificial Intelligence for Sales & Marketing.

The company was featured on the list of Best Places to Work and Best Paying Companies in 2020 by Built In NYC.
