= Adform =

Danish digital advertising technology company

- Founded: 2002
- Headquarters: Copenhagen, Denmark
- Area served: Worldwide
- Founders: Gustav Mellentin, Jakob Bak, Stefan Juricic
- Key people: Troels Philip Jensen (CEO); Oliver Whitten (COO); Dr. Jochen Schlosser (CTO)
- Industry: Online Advertising; Digital Marketing; Ad serving Software as a Service; Display advertising
- Products: DSP, Ad Server, SSP, DMP, Log-Level Data, DCO
- Employees: 700+ (2025)
- Subsidiaries: Splicky
- Website: https://site.adform.com/

Adform is a global digital media advertising technology company specializing in real-time programmatic marketing automation technologies. Its operations are headquartered in Europe. The company specialized in the creation of technology that helps digital advertisers, agencies, and publishers create, target, buy or sell, and display digital advertising across internet-connected devices.

== Operation ==
- When Adform launched in 2002 they were focused on providing ad serving which was supplemented by planning in 2005.
- In 2019 Adform re-branded its Advertiser Edge and Publisher Edge offerings as the Integrated Advertising Platform and the Integrated Advertising Platform for Publishers.
- In 2020 Adform launched an update to its user experience and underlying technology called Adform FLOW which was the winner of the Red Dot Design Award for the Communication Design Category and a 2022 iF Design Award.

The company was the first pan-European DSP. A Series B round of funding for US$5.5 million was closed in early 2014 followed by a 150 million Danish Kroner (US$21.5 million) investment by Danica Pension in late 2015. In 2018 an IPO was announced, but later postponed due to uncertainty and volatility in the financial markets at that time. In April 2019, Adform received an external investment from GRO Capital for an undisclosed amount. In April 2020, Troels Philip Jensen replaced Gustav Mellentin as CEO of Adform.

In December 2025, it was announced that Adform had agreed to acquire Splicky, the advertising technology division of Goldbach Group, to expand its presence in the DACH region. The acquisition, for which financial terms were not disclosed, was intended to integrate Splicky's programmatic digital out-of-home capabilities into Adform's global media buying platform, subject to customary closing conditions.

== See also ==
- Advertising technology
- Demand-side platform
- Supply-side platform
- Data management platform
- Ad serving
- Real-time bidding
- List of advertising technology companies
