= Woobi =

- Formerly: TokenAds
- Type: For-profit
- Industry: Marketing; Advertising; Public Relations
- Founded: 2009
- Founders: Chaya Soggot (CEO & Co-Founder); Ben Naftali (Co-Founder & Product Lead)
- Defunct: May 2020
- Headquarters: Tel Aviv, Israel

Woobi, formally known as TokenAds, was a digital marketing company based in Tel Aviv, Israel. It provided in-game advertising services for online games, including supply-side platforms and real-time bidding. The company's technology monetized non-paying users through value-exchange advertising, integrated into gameplay.

== History ==
Woobi was founded in 2009 under the name TokenAds. Its first product was a monetization solution for Facebook Apps before it began to produce technologies that allowed in-game advertising, monetizing free-to-play games using targeted advertising.

In 2009, TokenAds launched a concept to enable local brands to advertise to local audiences, and to provide real-time optimization based on game traits. In 2011, it moved away from integrating ad formats into payment sections in favor of integrating them into gameplay.

Later, Woobi launched its cross-game tracking technology aimed at improving user targeting capabilities. This led to its investment in developing wider user-profiling technologies and the release of its cross-data, profiling-based platform in 2013.

In 2014, the company submitted a patent for its Dynamic Mindset Advertising (DMA) technology, which was based on an algorithm integrated into free-to-play game loops and the user's gameplay. The DMA-based monetization technology attempted to identify moments where a user was more receptive to engage with brands before their ads were displayed.

Between the opportunities in online advertising and its own shift towards branded video advertising strategies, Woobi launched its own supply-side platform and real-time bidding exchange in 2016. The company also used its own buyer-side platform to serve as a gateway to online games for brand advertisers.

Between 2014 and 2016, Woobi opened offices in London and New York City. In September 2014, TokenAds rebranded as Woobi.

In May 2020, Woobi as well as its official website shut down all operations.

== Awards and nominations ==
In 2017, Woobi saw recognition for its services in numerous categories:

- Won the Digiday Video Awards for Best Video Distribution Platform.
- Won the White Bull Awards for the second year in a row.
- Nominated for the Digiday Europe Awards for Best Video Adtech Innovation.
- Nominated for the Drum Digital Trading Awards for Best Overall Technology for Programmatic Trading
