= Clickky =

Ukrainian advertising company

- Industry: Mobile advertising
- Founded: Odesa, Ukraine, 2010
- Founder: Vadim Rogovskiy
- Defunct: 2022
- Fate: Unknown
- Headquarters: Odesa, Ukraine
- Number of locations: Odesa, Moscow, New York City, Mumbai, Beijing
- Area served: Worldwide
- Products: Clickky RTB Marketplace, AdExchange API, Self-serve platform for publishers, Self-serve platform for advertisers, and Smartlink
- Website: https://clickky.biz/

Clickky was a Ukrainian full-stack platform for advertisers and publishers, which offered programmatic, performance and video advertising. Clickky focused on the developing of its own Supply-side platform (SSP) and Real-time bidding (RTB) Marketplace. The site was closed down in 2022.

Clickky was based in Ukraine and had offices in New York, Moscow, Mumbai and Beijing, with the R&D office in Odesa. As of 2016, according to the Ukraine Dealbook, Clickky made the list of Ukrainian IT companies with the most revenue abroad.

== History ==
The company evolved from Clickburner ad network, which was founded in 2010 by Vadim Rogovskiy.

In 2013, Clickky shifted its focus to the mobile market, offering practical advice for mobile app developers.

In May, 2015 Clickky received $2M from iTech Capital, a venture capital firm that focuses on growth investments in digital economy businesses. The company has shown a 1,498% growth over the four years, reaching €3.3 M revenue.

By early 2023, the official web site was no longer working.

== Activities ==
Clickky held an annual Mobile Beach Conference — a two-day mobile marketing and tech event, taking place in Odesa, Ukraine. In 2017, Mobile Beach Conference gathered over 800 mobile marketing professionals from 29 countries. The event also hosted Startup Alley, a competition for tech startups.
