= Ad exchange =

Technology platform for buying and selling of advertising

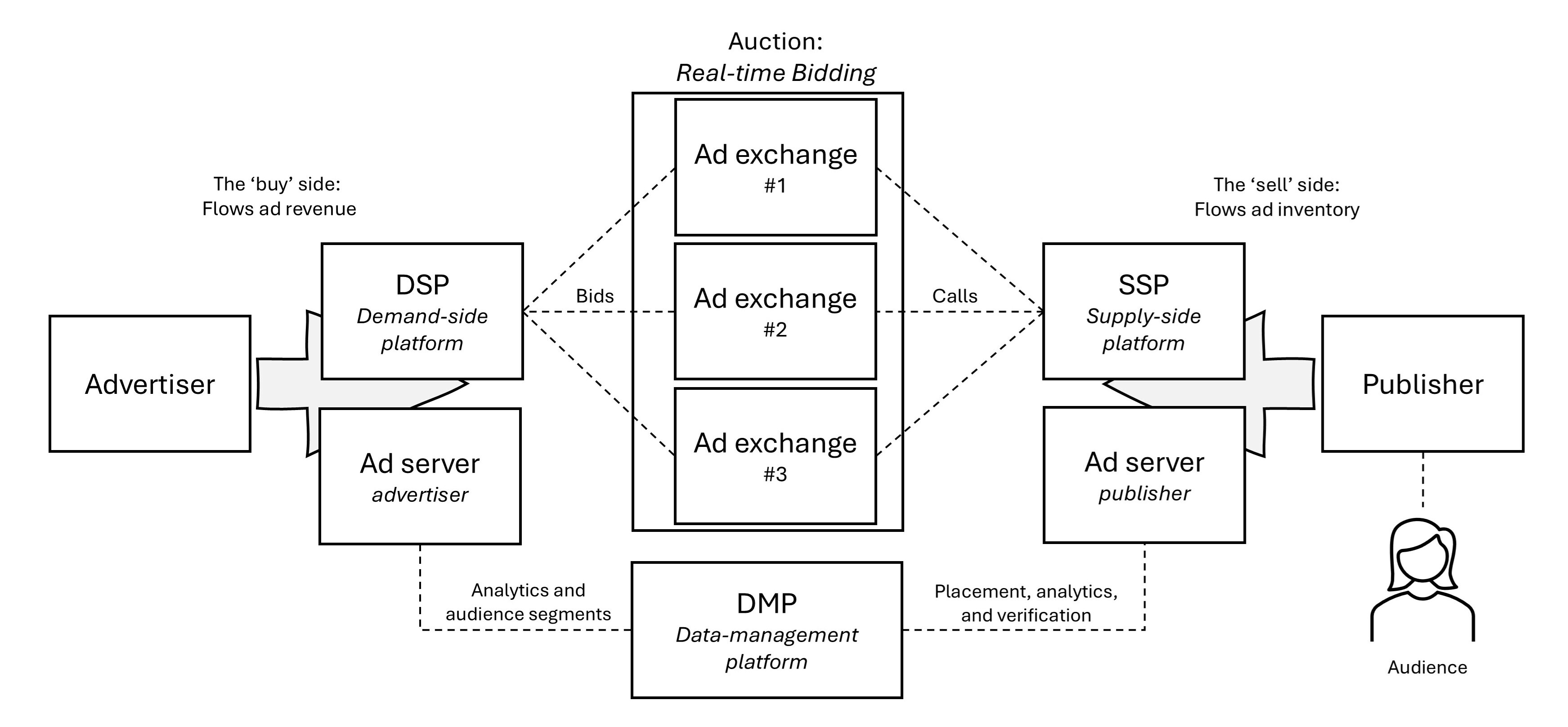
A visualization of the real-time bidding system in online display advertising.

An ad exchange, in online advertising, is a technology platform that facilitates the buying and selling of media advertising inventory from multiple ad networks. Prices for the inventory are determined through real-time bidding (RTB). The technology-driven method replaces the custom of negotiating prices on media inventory, a field beyond ad networks as defined by the Interactive Advertising Bureau (IAB), and by advertising trade publications. Ad tech companies operate ad exchanges as online marketplaces that digitally connect demand-side (DSP) ad buyers to supply-side (SSP) publishers.

== History ==
Before exchanges, publishers sold leftover ad space through advertising networks. These networks aggregated inventory from many sites, but didn't offer real-time bidding. In the early 2000s, Brian O'Kelley created the first ad exchange at Right Media, known as the Right Media Exchange, which officially launched in 2005. Right Media's ad exchange built algorithms for predicting, budgeting, and pacing, which enabled real-time bidding (RTB). Yahoo acquired Right Media in 2007, for $680 million, then shuttered the programmatic advertising DSP in 2014.

Around the same time, Jason Knapp and Fabrizio Blanco were also working on the concept of RTB at Strategic Data Corp. Knapp filed a patent on their RTB technology in 2006. In 2007, Google acquired DoubleClick and its ad exchange, AdX (now Google Ad Manager).

Demand-side platforms were designed to help advertisers bid for digital ad space in real-time across multiple exchanges. Supply-side platforms allow publishers to manage inventory before adding it to exchanges. During the mid 2020s, DSPs increasingly shifted from programmatic advertising to agentic commerce.

== Ad exchanges ==
Major ad exchanges include:

- Amazon DSP
- AppLovin
- Comcast FreeWheel
- Google Ad Manager, formerly AdX
- InMobi
- Magnite Inc
- Microsoft Advertising, (formerly Bing Ads; also acquired Xandr, formerly AppNexus)
- OpenX (company)
- PubMatic
- RTB House
- Verve Brand+ Marketplace (formerly Smaato)
- The Trade Desk
- Yahoo

== See also ==
- Programmatic advertising
- Header bidding
- Ad tech
- Agentic commerce
