= Brian O'Kelley =

American entrepreneur

- Born: Charles Brian O'Kelley; 1977 (age 48–49)
- Education: Princeton University
- Occupation: Entrepreneur
- Known for: Co-founder, CEO of Scope3; Co-founder, former CEO AppNexus
- Board member of: LiveRamp

Brian O'Kelley (born 1977) is an American technology entrepreneur who co-founded the advertising-technology company AppNexus and the emissions-measurement company Scope3. He was chief executive of AppNexus and is chief executive of Scope3.

== Early life and education ==
O'Kelley grew up in Eugene, Oregon and went to South Eugene High School, where he played basketball. After graduating high school in 1995, O'Kelley went to Princeton University, where he graduated in 1999 with a B.S.E. in Computer Science.

== Career ==
O'Kelley's first executive role was as CTO of Right Media, where he helped invent the ad exchange and precursor technology to what has become programmatic advertising. O'Kelley was fired from Right Media in 2007 after telling the board to not take a deal from Yahoo. Shortly thereafter, Right Media was sold to Yahoo for $850 million.

Together with Mike Nolet, Right Media's former Director of Analytics and Product Manager, O'Kelley founded AppNexus in 2007. At its height, AppNexus employed over 1,000 people. O'Kelley was CEO of the company until it acquired by AT&T for $1.6 billion in 2018.

Following the sale of AppNexus, O'Kelley chose to keep less than $100 million for himself and his family, donating the rest to charities. In an interview with Fortune, O'Kelley said, "I don't believe in billionaires. I think it's just ridiculous."

In 2019, O'Kelley founded CMDTY together with Andrea Aranguren, later changing the company name to Waybridge in November 2020. Waybridge seeks to apply data and technology to supply chain and logistics management.

In 2021, O'Kelley co-founded Scope3 together with Anne Coghlan. Scope3 aims to help advertisers and publishers reduce emissions associated with digital advertising.

=== Patents ===
O'Kelley is credited as an inventor on more than a dozen US patents relating to advertising technology.

== Awards ==
- Crain's 40 under 40 (2012)
- The Silicon Alley 100 (2010)
