= AppNexus =

Technology company

AppNexus Inc.
- Type: Subsidiary
- Industry: Online advertising
- Founded: 2007; 19 years ago
- Headquarters: New York City, United States
- Area served: Worldwide
- Key people: Michael Rubenstein (president)
- Products: Infrastructure as a service Ad serving Analytics
- Number of employees: 1000+
- Parent: Xandr (2018-present)

AppNexus is an American multinational technology company operating a cloud-based software platform that enables and optimizes programmatic online advertising.

== History ==
AppNexus was founded in 2007 by former Right Media staff, CTO Brian O'Kelley, and Mike Nolet, product manager and director of analytics. Michael Rubenstein, a former vice president and general manager at Google DoubleClick, who joined AppNexus as president in September 2009. The company was financially backed by Microsoft, Khosla Ventures, First Round Capital, Venrock, Kodiak Venture Partners, Marc Andreessen, Ben Horowitz, and Ron Conway; as of 2015 the company had raised $250 million in financing. O'Kelley stepped down as CEO in October 2018.

== Operations ==
AppNexus is headquartered in the Flatiron District of New York City. The company operates out of 23 offices in North America, Latin America, Europe, Asia and Australia.

AppNexus offers online auction infrastructure and technology for data management, optimization, financial clearing and support for directly negotiated advertising campaigns. It has both demand-side platform (DSP), supply-side platform (SSP), and ad serving functionalities. It integrates with advertising sources including Google's "Authorized Buyers" ad exchange, Magnite, Pubmatic and other aggregators. It operates out of multiple data centers, including one in Amsterdam serving Europe and the Middle East, in a facility shared with Equinix.

In June 2018, AT&T announced it was acquiring the company and putting it under its Xandr division as a subsidiary. AppNexus was reportedly sold for $1.6 billion, while most news outlets speculated the company did not sell for less than $2 billion.

In October 2019, Xandr purchased Clypd, a privately held technology company focused on enabling programmatic buying of linear television advertising.

In December 2021, AT&T announced that they had agreed to sell Xandr to Microsoft for an undisclosed price, subject to customary closing conditions, including regulatory reviews.
