= Pubmatic =

Online advertising company

PubMatic, Inc.
- Type: Public
- Traded as: Nasdaq: PUBM
- Industry: Online Advertising
- Founded: 2006; 20 years ago
- Founder: Amar Goel; Anand Das; Mukul Kumar; Rajeev Goel
- Headquarters: Redwood City, California
- Key people: Amar Goel (chairman); Cathie Black (director); Rajeev Goel (CEO)
- Revenue: ▼US$283 million (2025)
- Net income: ▼ −US$14.5 million (2025)
- Website: pubmatic.com

PubMatic, Inc. develops and implements online advertising software and strategies for the digital publishing and advertising industry. PubMatic's sell-side, real-time programmatic ad transaction advertising software puts publishers of websites, videos, and mobile apps into contact with ad buyers by using automated systems, while allowing users to opt-out of having their personal information collected on internet searches. PubMatic has a number of offices in countries around the world.

== History ==
PubMatic was founded in 2006 by brothers Rajeev Goel and Amar Goel, Anand Das and Mukul Kumar. PubMatic software was developed in Pune, India.

In 2011 the company hired Steve Pantelick as CFO, and in 2012 PubMatic raised $45 million from investors.

In 2014 PubMatic acquired mobile ad server Mocean Mobile, formerly knows as Mojiva, for $15.5 million.

In 2015, PubMatic opened an office in Latin America.

By 2016, the firm was operating by storing most of its data on OpenStack private cloud servers.

In January 2020, PubMatic launched an Identity Hub integrating identity partner IDs, including IAB DigiTrust, The Trade Desk Unified ID (UID 2.0), ID5, and LiveIntent.

In February 2020, PubMatic released the OpenWrap SDK to enhance header bidding options for mobile publishers.

In November 2020, PubMatic filed for an IPO in Nasdaq. The company launched its IPO on 9 December 2020. Its clients in 2020 included Verizon, News Corp, Electronic Arts, and Zynga, with Verizon comprising about a quarter of Pubmatic's revenue during the previous year.

In September 2025, PubMatic filed a lawsuit against Google over anti-competitive behavior.

== Activities ==
PubMatic, for a fee, participates in online auctions to help advertisers buy and publishers sell media and advertising spots between various advertising companies. The company also produces quarterly reports about advertising prices.
