= Equativ =

French advertising technology company

- Formerly: Smart AdServer
- Company type: Private
- Industry: Advertising technology
- Predecessor: Aufeminin
- Founded: 2001
- Headquarters: Paris, France
- Area served: Worldwide
- Key people: Arnaud Créput (CEO); JF Cote (Cofounder Sharethrough & Strategic Advisor)
- Products: Ad Server, SSP, DSP, Curation, CTV Ad Insertion
- Revenue: ▲Over $200M (net recurring revenue, 2024) ▲$100M (net recurring revenue, 2022) €197M (gross revenue, 2021)
- Owner: Bridgepoint Group (majority shareholder), Capital Croissance
- Number of employees: 800+ (2025)
- Website: equativ.com

Equativ (formerly known as Smart AdServer) is a French advertising technology company that provides a vertically integrated platform for both advertisers and publishers. The company operates an ad server, a SSP, and a DSP, with a focus on solutions for Advanced TV and premium publishers.

Created in 2001 as part of Aufeminin, it was sold to private-equity fund Cathay Capital in 2015, then to private-equity fund Capital Croissance in 2021. In 2023, Bridgepoint Group became the majority shareholder. It operates globally in the US, Europe, Latin America and Asia.

== History ==
Smart AdServer was created in 2001 by aufeminin.com to manage advertisements on the publisher's websites. It became an independent company within the same group in 2005, then expanded locally and internationally.

In 2007, Axel Springer SE, the largest digital publishing house in Europe, bought AuFeminin. Following that take-over, the company expanded into Europe, Latin America and the United States. In 2015, Axel Springer sold the company to private equity fund Cathay Capital for €37 million.

In 2021, private equity fund Capital Croissance became the new majority shareholder of the company in a secondary LBO, with the aim of accelerating the company's development in the United States and in connected TV. In June 2022, the company rebranded from Smart AdServer to Equativ to reflect its unified and comprehensive service offerings.

In February 2023, Equativ was acquired by the Private Equity fund Bridgepoint Group, in a transaction valued at over €300m. The acquisition was intended to help Equativ scale and become a globally competitive independent alternative to ad tech "walled gardens".

== Mergers and acquisitions ==
In 2019, Equativ acquired LiquidM, a global Demand Side Platform (DSP) based in Berlin, to create a more integrated platform for both advertisers and publishers.

In 2021, Equativ acquired DynAdmic, a video advertising platform, to enhance its cookie-free targeting capabilities for video and CTV.

In 2022, Equativ acquired Nowtilus, a German specialist in server-side ad insertion (SSAI), to strengthen its position in the advanced TV market.

In 2024, Equativ merged with Sharethrough, a Supply Side Platform (SSP) based in Canada. The merger aimed to significantly increase Equativ's scale in North America and create a combined entity with over $200 million in net recurring revenue. In June 2025, the company announced that both entities would fully unify and operate under the Equativ brand name.

== Products and services ==
Equativ operates a unified, vertically integrated platform designed to serve both the supply and demand sides of the advertising ecosystem.

- Equativ Seller Connect: An integrated ad server and SSP that allows publishers to manage and monetize their advertising inventory across multiple formats, including display, video, and CTV.
- Equativ Buyer Connect: The company's DSP, which provides advertisers and agencies with access to ad inventory for programmatic buying.
- Equativ Curation: A platform that enables data providers, agencies, and publishers to package ad inventory with targeting data into curated deals for advertisers.
- CTV and Video: Through its acquisition of Nowtilus, Equativ offers server-side ad insertion (SSAI) solutions for live and on-demand video streaming, a key technology for advertising on Connected TV platforms.

== See also ==
- Supply-side platform
- Real-Time Bidding
