= Digital display advertising =

Type of advertising

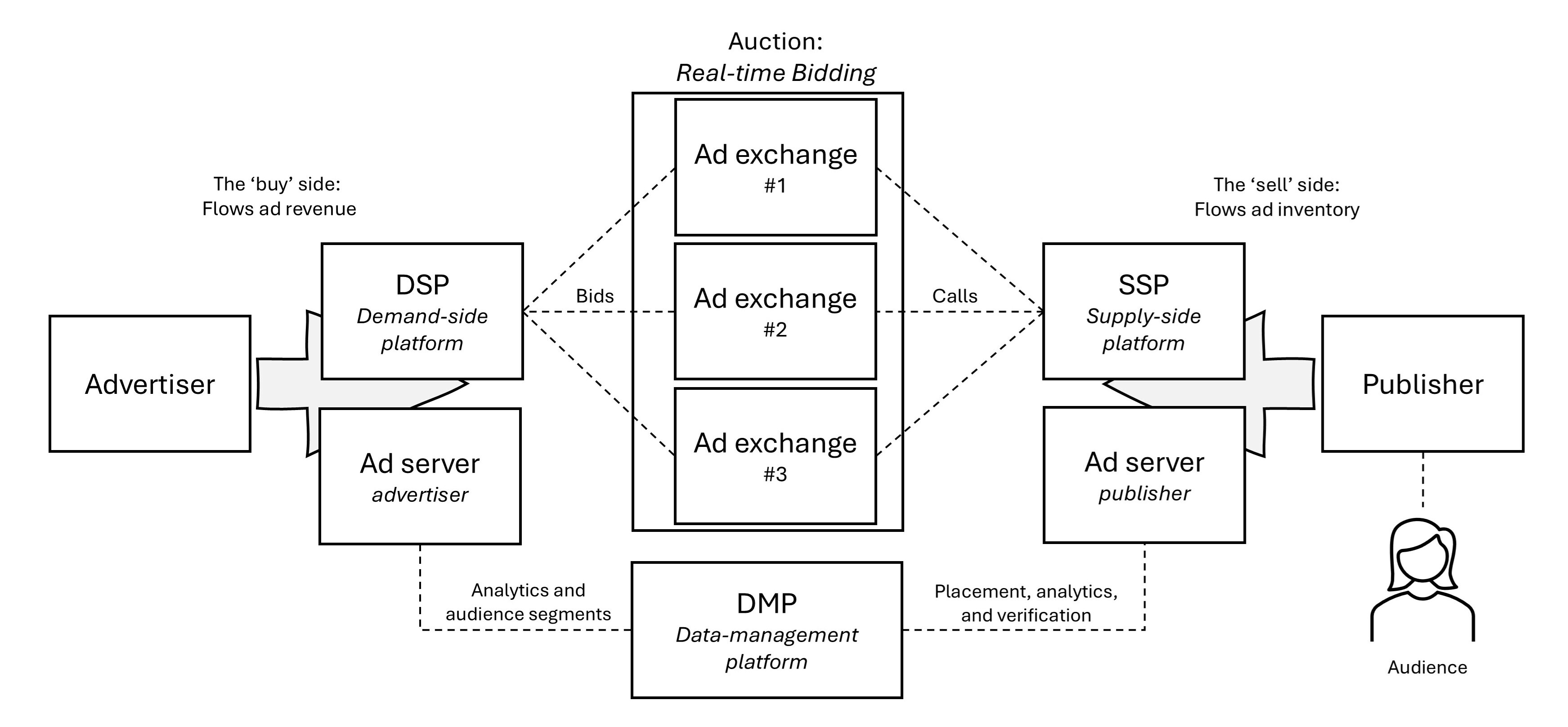
Inside the digital market of programmatic advertising

Digital display advertising is online graphic advertising through banners, text, images, video, and audio. The main purpose of digital display advertising is to post company ads on third-party websites. A display ad is usually interactive (i.e. clickable), which allows brands and advertisers to engage deeper with the users. A display ad can also be a companion ad for a non-clickable video ad.

According to eMarketer, Facebook and Twitter were set to take 33 percent of display ad spending market share by 2017. Desktop display advertising eclipsed search ad buying in 2014, with mobile ad spending overtaking display in 2015.

== Overview ==
Digital display advertising is an online form of advertising in which the company's promotional messages appear on third-party sites or search engine results pages such as publishers or social networks. There is evidence showing that this advertising can increase the number of website page views of a company from most types of customers except from the non-authenticated visitors who visited the website before. The main purpose of display advertising is to support brand awareness, (Robinson et al., 2007) and it also helps to increase the purchase intention of consumers.

Social media is used by many organizations. One example is, in 2014, ASOS and Nike collaborated with Google Hangouts to create the first shoppable video web chat on Google+. The video is an example of display advertising used for commemorating 27 years of Nike's Air Max shoes. The video advertising aimed at creating brand awareness among users and convincing them to watch the Hangout and purchase products from the display advertising itself. Consumers were able to shop by clicking the display advertising. According to an ASOS statement, display advertising has contributed to an increase in both the number of users visiting its website and downloads of the ASOS App by 28 percent, with users having then visited the website eight times a month, on average.

== History ==
Since the early advent of technology, the Internet has completely changed the way people relate to advertisements. As computers prices decreased, online content became accessible to a large portion of the world's population. This change has modified the way people are exposed to media and advertising and has led to the creation of online channels through which advertisements can reach users.

The first type of relationship between a website and an advertiser was a straightforward, direct partnership. This partnership model implies that the advertiser promoting a product or service pays the website (also known as a publisher) directly for a certain amount of ad impressions. The first digital ad, called a banner ad, was run in 1994 by AT&T on a site called HotWired.

As time went on, publishers began creating thousands of websites, leading to millions of pages with unsold ad space. This gave rise to a new set of companies called Ad Networks. The ad network acted as a broker, buying unsold ad space from multiple publishers and packaged them into audiences to be sold to advertisers. This second wave of advertiser-publisher relationships rapidly gained popularity as it was convenient and useful for buyers who often found themselves paying a lower price yet receiving enhanced targeting capabilities through ad networks.

The third and most recent major development that shaped the advertiser-publisher ecosystem started occurring in the late 2000s when widespread adoption of RTB (real time bidding) technology took place. Also referred to as programmatic bidding, RTB allowed companies representing buyers and sellers to bid on the price to show an ad to a user every time a banner ad is loading. When a page loads during a user visit, there are thousands of bids occurring from advertisers to serve an ad to that user, based on each company's individual algorithms. With this most recent change in the industry, more and more ads are being sold on a single-impression basis, as opposed to in bulk purchases.

== =Programmatic, Real time bidding (RTB) ==
Programmatic display advertising, or real time bidding (RTB), transformed the way digital display advertising is bought and managed in recent years. Rather than placing a booking for advertising directly with a website, advertisers will manage their activity through a (demand side platform), and bid to advertise to people in real time, across multiple websites, based on targeting criteria. This method of advertising quickly gained popularity, as it allows for more control for the advertiser (or agency), including of the individual target audience, rather than just the website. It has become a threat to website operators and generally the cost paid for advertising in this way is less than the old method and so the earning potential for them is reduced.

Programmatic is not without its drawbacks, as without the appropriate management adverts can appear against unsavoury content or inappropriate news topics. This issue became front-page news in February 2017, when advertisers on YouTube were found displayed on terror group websites and fake news sites. As a result, a number of major advertisers paused all of their online advertising until they could put the appropriate measures in place to prevent this occurring again.

Other issues can arise from this method of buying display ads, for example since DSPs mostly buy from inventory on the public ad exchanges, the quality of the impressions bought can often be questionable and low value. in response to this, in the past few years we have seen the proliferation and use of private deals through PMPs.

=== First online advertisement ===
The birthday of the first banner display on the World Wide Web was on 27 October 1994. It appeared on HotWired, the first commercial web magazine.

The COCONET online service had graphical online banner ads starting in 1988 in San Diego, California. The Prodigy service, launched also in 1988, also had banner ads.

== Operations ==
=== Accounts department ===
The accounts department meet with the client to define campaign goals and translate those goals into a creative brief to be forwarded to the creative department.

=== Creative department ===
The role of the creative team is to conceptualise and create the advert. They have to develop a creative execution that will be compelling enough to drive a customer to buy a product or a service. The team often consists of a mix of copy writers and graphic designers who use their respective skillsets to communicate via copy and visuals.

=== Media planner ===
A media planner determines which advertising channels to use for a given campaign and when ads should run. The role involves reviewing audience data and media options to match a client's budget and objectives. Media planners typically work within advertising agencies and hand off their recommendations to media buyers, who handle the actual purchasing of ad space and airtime.

=== Ad operations ===
Ad Operations, or 'Ad ops', are the people who ensure that the ad is physically delivered to the correct website at the correct time. They do this by uploading the ad into the advertiser's ad server so that it can be delivered to the website and displayed to the end user who will see it. They are also responsible of delivering 100% of the advertiser's budget in an ad campaign by regularly tracking the ad campaign performance and optimizing it towards the advertiser's KPIs.

=== Ad server ===
Ad servers helps manage digital display advertisements. It is an advertising technology (ad tech) tool that, throughout a platform, administrates the ads and their distribution. It is basically a service or technology for a company that takes care of all the ad campaign programs and by receiving the ad files it is able to allocate them in different websites. The ad server is responsible for things such as the dates by which the campaign has to run on a website; the rapidity in which an ad as to be spread and where (geographic location targeting, language targeting.. ); controlling that an ad is not overseen by a user by limiting the number of visualisations; proposing an ad on past behaviour targeting.

There are different types of ad servers. There is an ad server for publishers that helps them to launch a new ad on a website by listing the highest ads' price on its and to follow the ad's growth by registering how many users it has reached. There is an ad server for advertisers that helps them by sending the ads in the form of HTML codes to each publisher. In this way, it is possible to open the ad in every moment and make changes of frequency for example, at all times. Lastly, there is an ad server for ad networks that provides information as in which network the publisher is registering an income and which is the daily revenue.

=== Importance of formats of display ads ===
Two students of the "Amsterdam school of Communication Research ASCor" have run studies about the audience reactions to different display advertising formats. In particular, they took into consideration two different types of format (sponsored content and banner advertising) to demonstrate that people react and perceive formats in different ways, positive and negative. For this reason, it is important to choose the right format because it will help to make the most of the medium. It is also possible to add:

- Video;
- Rich Media Ads (Expandables): flash files that may expand when the user interacts on mouseover (polite), or auto- initiated (non-polite);
- Overlays: ads that appear above content and that are possible to remove by clicking on a close button;
- Interstitials: Ads that are displayed on web pages before expected content (before the target page is displayed on the user's screen);
- Sponsorship: including a logo or adding a brand to the design of a website. This can also fall under native advertising, which is an ad that can seem like Editorial, or "In-Feed", but has really been paid for by the advertiser

IAB standard ad sizes. This illustration has been reduced in size. See actual sizes.

To help to better select the right format for the type of ad, Interactive Advertising Bureau has realized a Display Standard Ad Unit Portfolio that works as a guideline that can be followed by the creatives. The IAB ad sizes as of 2007 are :

- Rectangles and Pop-Ups (Note: This group was added around the beginning of 2000.)
  - Medium rectangle: 300 x 250
  - Square pop-up: 250 x 250
  - Vertical rectangle: 240 x 400
  - Large rectangle: 336 x 280
  - Rectangle: 180 x 150
  - 3:1 Rectangle: 300 x 100 (Note: Added in 2007 update.)
  - Pop-Under: 720 x 300
- Banners and Buttons
  - Full banner: 468 x 60
  - Half banner: 234 x 60
  - Micro bar: 88 x 31
  - Button 1: 120 x 90
  - Button 2: 120 x 60
  - Vertical banner: 120 x 240
  - Square button: 125 x 125
  - Leaderboard: 728 x 90 (Note: Added in 2003 update.)
- Skyscrapers
  - Wide skyscraper: 160 x 600
  - Skyscraper: 120 x 600
  - Half-page: 300 x 600 (Note: Added in 2004 update.)

Those sizes that are bold above are part of the Universal Ad Package.Grayed entries were delisted after the update in 2011. Standard banner ad sizes are constantly evolving due to consumer creative fatigue and banner blindness. Ad companies consistently test performance of ad units to ensure maximum performance for their clients. IAB has updated its guideline bi-annually.

In 2015, IAB announced advertising creative guidelines for display & mobile, considering HTML5.

Typical web banner, sized 468×60 pixels.

In 2017 IAB also introduced the new guidelines, featuring adjustable ad formats, as well as the guidelines for new digital content experiences such as augmented reality (AR), virtual reality (VR), social media, mobile video, emoji ad messaging, and 360-degree video ads.

Fixed size ad spec is:

Ad unit Name	Fixed Size (px)
Billboard	970 x 250
Smartphone Banner	300 x 50、320 x 50
Leaderboard	728 x 90
Super Leaderboard/Pushdown	970 x 90
Portrait	300 x 1050
Skyscraper	160 x 600
Medium Rectangle	300 x 250
120x160	120 x 160
Mobile Phone Interstitial	640 x 1136、750 x 1334、1080 x 1920
Feature Phone Small Banner	120 x 20
Feature Phone Medium Banner	168 x 28
Feature Phone Large Banner	216 x 36

==== Ad Fatigue or Ads boredom ====
Display advertising Fatigue is the term used to describe the state in which consumers lose their sensitivity to or responsiveness to display advertising as a result of prolonged exposure to them. This may lead to poorer click-through rates (CTR), lower engagement rates, and a general decline in the efficacy of ad campaigns. Digital advertising strategies that largely rely on Re-targeting or repetitive exposure across websites and platforms are more likely to face the issue of display ad fatigue. Most common example of ad fatigue is Youtube Ads, Published by Google Ads Advertisers around the world.

===== Reasons for Fatigue from Display Ads =====
Overexposure: If users see the same advertisements too often, they may grow irritated or stop noticing them altogether, and the ads become less effective.

Lack of Variety: Users may become disinterested if they always encounter the same messaging, creatives and ad formats.

Inadequate Targeting: Users may become disengaged or uninterested in ads that are not tailored or relevant to them.

== See also ==
- Web banner
- Internet marketing
- Online advertising
- Mobile advertising
- Native advertising
- Pop-up ad
- Interstitial webpage
- Interactive media
- Hover ad
- Affiliate marketing
- Pay per click
- Site Retargeting
