= SpotX =

Global video ad serving platform

- Company type: Public (part of Magnite)
- Industry: Advertising Technology
- Founded: 2007
- Headquarters: Denver, Colorado, USA
- Area served: 190+ Countries
- Key people: Michael Shehan (co-founder, CEO), Steve Swoboda (co-founder, CFO), J. Allen Dove (CTO), Sean Buckley (COO)
- Owner: Magnite, Inc. (100% stake)
- Number of employees: 400+
- Website: www.spotx.tv

SpotX is a video advertising and monetization platform. Billions of video ad decisions are transacted through the SpotX platform daily, with ads delivered to over 70 million US households. The company is headquartered north of Denver, Colorado with additional offices worldwide, including Belfast, London, New York, Salt Lake City, San Francisco, Singapore, Sydney, and Tokyo.

== History ==
SpotX was founded as a division of the search engine marketing technologies and services company, Booyah Networks. The company's founders are Michael Shehan (CEO) and Steve Swoboda (COO and CFO).

In March 2007, SpotX, initially SpotXchange, formed a separate company from Booyah that focused on digital video advertising technology. In 2009, SpotX launched targeting tools to help advertisers reach their audiences. In 2010, SpotX launched its real-time bidding solution, which helps companies tailor their bids on an impression-by-impression basis when bidding on in-stream and in-banner video ad inventory.

In July 2016, RTL Group announced its 65% majority stake purchase of SpotX at $144 million and completed its 100% acquisition of the company in October 2017 for $145 million in a deal that valued SpotX at $404 million.

In 2015, SpotXchange rebranded as SpotX. In 2017, SpotX relaunched its website.

In 2020, SpotX made a strategic investment in SpringServe, a supply-side ad server for CTV.

In 2021, SpotX was acquired by Magnite, Inc., the world's largest independent sell-side advertising platform, for $1.17 billion.
