= Interactive Advertising Bureau =

American advertising business organization

- Formation: 1996; 30 years ago
- Type: Trade association
- Legal status: Nonprofit 501(c)(6)
- Headquarters: New York City, U.S.
- Region served: Global
- Members: 600+
- Leader: David Cohen
- Revenue: 34,035,197 USD (2023)
- Expenses: 33,101,333 USD (2023)
- Website: www.iab.com

The Interactive Advertising Bureau (IAB) is an American advertising trade association and lobbying group that advocates for the interests of the online advertising industry. The organization develops industry standards, conducts research, and provides legal support for its members, which include many of the most prominent media and tech companies globally, primarily in the United States, Canada, and Europe.

The IAB actively lobbies against stringent online privacy legislation, arguing that strict regulations harm the digital economy. The organization has faced significant criticism from privacy advocates for drafting self-regulatory frameworks—such as the Transparency and Consent Framework in Europe—which critics argue were designed to legitimize and enable widespread user tracking rather than protect consumer privacy.

== Structure ==
The IAB Global Network is made up of 42 international licensee organizations around the world. IAB Europe is a coalition of 27 national IABs across Europe, and over 500 companies. The IAB publishes Mediascope Europe annually, a media consumption study based on over 50,000 consumer interviews.

The IAB's organizational model includes four areas: IAB (New Membership Criteria), IAB Education Foundation, IAB Technology Lab and Trustworthy Accountability Group. The Trustworthy Accountability Group is industry-owned whereas the rest are owned by IAB. Display ads are subject to standards established by the IAB.

== History ==
Founded in 1996, the IAB is based in New York City. David Cohen is the chief executive officer (CEO) of the organization.

It has developed a number of interface formats for digital advertising metadata, including the Video Ad Serving Template and Video Player-Ad Interface Definition formats. On February 26, 2012, IAB released IAB Standard Ad Unit Portfolio, that included detailed information on all display advertising formats.

In June 2011, the IAB, in partnership with the ANA Association of National Advertisers and the 4A's American Association of Advertising Agencies released the Guiding Principles of Digital Measurement. These five principles became the foundation of "Making Measurement Make Sense" (3MS) and created a basis for the advance of viewability metric. The collaboration between ANA, 4A's, and IAB also resulted in the creation of Trustworthy Accountability Group an initiative that includes members GroupM Interaction, AppNexus, engage:BDR, GumGum and OpenX.

On May 31, 2012, the IAB criticized Microsoft for enabling Do Not Track by default in Internet Explorer 10. One of the main criticisms of IAB's response is that tracking should be opt in, not opt out.

On March 12, 2013, the IAB launched a campaign against Mozilla for planning to turn on blocking of third party HTTP cookies in version 22 of Firefox. In July 2013, IAB CEO Randall Rothenberg described Mozilla as "mob rule" and personally attacked specific Mozilla developers for their position on privacy. The campaign has received significant criticism from online privacy advocates.

In January 2016, the IAB did not allow the developers of Adblock Plus to attend their event, and refunded the money that Adblock Plus paid. The IAB did not disclose why they did not allow Adblock Plus to attend. In May 2016, Business Insider reported that the IAB leader had, in January, described Adblock Plus as an "unethical, immoral, mendacious coven of tech wannabes" and an "old-fashioned extortion racket."

In June 2017, the IAB finalized its specification for the initial version of an ads.txt standard for publishers to list authorized sellers.

In February 2020, the IAB formed an industry-wide consortium under 'Project Rearc' to find a solution to third-party cookies being blocked.

In October 2024, the IAB, along with the NCTA and the Electronic Security Association, sued to block the US Federal Trade Commission (FTC) from implementing its so-called "click to cancel" rule, a set of revisions to the FTC's Negative Option Rule that would require businesses to make the cancellation process for subscriptions, renewals, and free trials that convert to paid memberships as easy as the signup process as well as to obtain proof of consent before billing customers for such services.

=== Transparency and Consent Framework ===
In November 2017, IAB Europe announced a technical framework (IAB Europe Transparency and Consent framework, or TCF) intended to “enable websites, advertisers and their ad technology partners” to obtain, record and update consumer consent for their personal data to be processed in line with the upcoming General Data Protection Regulation (GDPR). Actors can join the TCF through paying a membership fee to IAB Europe, and tailor their data usage purposes and organizational data processing policies to the wording and specifications in the framework laid out in the technical standards and the policy terms and conditions agreed with IAB Europe, initially made available to the public in March 2018. Actors who are members of the TCF are listed in the regularly-updated Global Vendor List published by IAB Europe, which is used by all vendors to know which other organizations are technically and contractually bound by the TCF, and to give vendors common ways to refer to each other the standardized Transparency and Consent String that is sent as metadata between actors in the online advertising industry.

In 2019, 12 complaints were filed by NGOs across Europe, including the Panoptykon Foundation, Bits of Freedom, Ligue des droits de l'homme and the Irish Council for Civil Liberties, against IAB Europe in relation to a range of breaches of the GDPR concerning the Transparency and Consent Framework.

In February 2022, the Belgian Data Protection Authority released a ruling, approved by the European Data Protection Board and triggered by the complaints above, relating to the data protection compliance of the Transparency and Consent Framework. It found multiple failings of the IAB Europe, fining it 250,000 EUR, and demanding it change a range of aspects of the system to ensure that, among other requirements, consent signals were valid and adhere to, and prohibiting the use of certain legal bases by its members. Academic commentators have argued that aspects of this decision point to aspects of online advertising that will be structurally difficult or impossible for the TCF alone to fix, even if it does alter, instead requiring fundamental changes in the underlying real-time bidding system. IAB Europe states it intends to appeal this ruling. The Dutch Data Protection Authority shortly after announced separately from the Belgian Data Protection Authority that Dutch agencies should stop using the system provided by IAB Europe.

== See also ==
- Interactive advertising
- Online advertising
- Display advertising
- Behavioral targeting
- Contextual advertising
