= Internet Advertising Bureau =

United Kingdom trade organization

The Internet Advertising Bureau UK (IAB UK) is the industry body for digital advertising in the United Kingdom, founded in 1997. It promotes a sustainable future for digital advertising and best practice for advertisers, agencies, and media owners. It is apparently related to the global Interactive Advertising Bureau.

== Chairman ==
Richard Eyre has been the Chairman of IAB UK since March 2003. In 2013, he was awarded the Advertising Association's Mackintosh Medal. In January 2014, he was appointed a CBE for services to advertising and the media in the New Years Honours.

== Chief Executive ==
Jon Mew has been Chief Executive Officer since 5 January 2017.

== Activities ==
=== Spend & Audience Benchmarking ===
The IAB UK PwC Digital Adspend study has tracked the growth of the online and mobile advertising industry since 1997. In 2016, it was reported that adspend on mobile display had overtaken that on PC for the first time.

The IAB works with UKOM on establishing the industry-approved standard for online audience measurement.

=== Flagship Events ===
The IAB holds an annual flagship event, Engage, in addition to research breakfasts, workshops, seminars, and other conferences throughout the year. In 2013, the IAB's Engage event won an award for In House Event of the Year at the UK Event Awards. In 2014, Mobile Engage won Corporate Event of the Year at the same awards.

Since 2016, IAB UK has held an annual Leadership Summit bringing together senior industry leaders for discussions.

=== Training ===
The IAB also has a training department educating advertisers, publishers, and agency talent on many aspects of digital.

=== Groups ===
IAB members participate in specialism groups covering online disciplines; these councils help guide and deliver IAB initiatives. As of 2019, these groups include search, audio, gaming, connected TV, mobile and in-app, video and more.

=== Policy and Regulatory Affairs ===
The IAB established a regulatory department in 2008 to help members develop best practice guidelines and participate in policy dialogues with the Government, the EU, and consumer groups. IAB UK has been instrumental in co-ordinating the UK ad tech industry's response to the ICO's ‘Update report into adtech and real time bidding'.
