= Magnite Inc =

American advertising technology firm

Magnite Inc.
- Formerly: Rubicon Project
- Type: Public
- Traded as: Nasdaq: MGNI
- Industry: Internet; Computer software Advertising
- Founded: Los Angeles, California (May 1, 2007)
- Headquarters: United States
- Area served: Worldwide
- Key people: Michael Barrett, President & CEO
- Revenue: ▲US$714 million (2025)
- Net income: ▲US$145 million (2025)
- Website: www.magnite.com

Magnite Inc. (formerly Rubicon Project) is an American online advertising technology firm based in Los Angeles, California. The company was formed following a merger between Rubicon Project and Telaria in 2020.

== History ==
Rubicon Project was founded in 2007 by Frank Addante, Craig Roah, Duc Chau and Julie Mattern, who had previously worked together at L90/adMonitor, an online advertising network.

By April 2009, the company had raised $33 million in venture funding led by Clearstone Venture Partners, IDG Ventures Asia and Mayfield Fund. The company also secured $8 million in venture debt from Silicon Valley Bank.

In February 2014, Rubicon Project filed for an IPO and went public in April 2014 opening at over $20 per share. The stock fell back to about $16 per share later in the month.

In March 2014, the company was named number two on the top Ad Exchange Entities by comScore.

In February 2017, the company released its president and several other top executives. On March 14, 2017, CEO and founder Frank Addante stepped down from his position to take the role of chairman. The company announced Michael Barrett, previously the chief executive of mobile advertising marketplace Millennial Media and chief revenue officer at Yahoo!, would be the new chief executive.

In May 2024, Netflix announced its first expansion of its advertising partnerships to include Magnite, The Trade Desk and Google DV360.

On May 19, 2025, OSN has chosen Magnite, the independent sell-side advertising company, to power its new “Advanced TV” advertising solution. This marks the first time OSN will offer addressable advertising across its set-top box (STB) linear broadcast and video-on-demand (VOD) inventory. Using Magnite’s SpringServe video platform, targeted ads will now be delivered to OSN set-top boxes across the MENA region.

In September 2025, Magnite filed a lawsuit against Google over alleged monopolistic and anticompetitive behavior.

== Mergers and acquisitions ==
=== Rubicon Project acquisitions ===
In September 2009, the Rubicon Project acquired OthersOnline, an audience profiling technology company based in Seattle.

In May 2010, the company bought Site Scout, a malware detection company also based in Seattle.

In October 2010, the company acquired Fox Audience Network from News Corp in return for a minority stake in the company. It also received $18 million in additional funding led by Peacock Equity, the venture division of NBC Universal.

In May 2012, Rubicon Project acquired Mobsmith, a mobile technology company.

In August 2012, the company became the top-ranked online advertising company in terms of reach, with a 96.2% audience share, according to rankings provided by ComScore. This placed Rubicon ahead of Google for the first time, and also ahead of other competitors such as AOL and AT&T.

In October 2019, Rubicon Project acquired RTK.io, a header bidding startup for $11 million.

=== Merger with Telaria ===
In December 2019, Rubicon Project and Telaria announced a merger. Shareholders of Telaria and Rubicon project approved the merger on March 30, 2020, and the merger was completed on April 1.

While the two businesses initially fell under Rubicon Project and operated as two separate brands, the company rebranded under the name Magnite in June 2020. The merger made Magnite the world's largest independent omnichannel sell-side platform.

=== Recent acquisitions ===
In February 2021, Magnite acquired SpotX from European entertainment network RTL Group for $1.17 billion in cash and stock.

In September 2025, Magnite acquired Streamr.ai, a company that specializes in the development of AI-generated assets for small businesses' CTV campaigns.

== See also ==
- Supply-side platform
- Real-Time Bidding
