= Google Marketing Platform =

Advertising and analytics platform

- Developer: Google
- Release: July 24, 2018; 8 years ago
- Predecessor: DoubleClick
- Type: Digital marketing, Online advertising, Web analytics
- Website: marketingplatform.google.com

Google Marketing Platform is an online advertising and analytics platform developed by Google and launched on July 24, 2018. It unifies DoubleClick's advertising services (acquired in March 2008) and Google's own advertising and analytics services. Google Marketing Platform is mainly used by big advertisers to buy ads on the Internet.

Google Ads (launched in 2000) and Google Ad Manager (launched in 2010) are not parts of Google Marketing Platform. The three brands are complementary tools targeting different types of ad buyers and presenting slightly different features.

== Services ==
Google Marketing Platform includes the following services:

- Display & Video 360 (demand-side platform)
- Search Ads 360 (search advertising)
- Campaign Manager 360 (ad management and measurement)
- Google Analytics 360 (web analytics)
- Google Tag Manager (tag management)
- Google Optimize (web analytics)
- Data Studio, formerly Looker Studio (web analytics)

== Accessibility ==
To access the tools of the Google Marketing Platform, specialists need to pass appropriate certifications, and companies need to have certified specialists on staff or as contractors.
