= Tim Cadogan =

British-American entrepreneur and CEO of GoFundMe

- Born: Timothy R. Cadogan; England, United Kingdom
- Education: London School of Economics (BSc) University of Oxford (MPhil) Stanford University (MBA)
- Occupations: CEO of GoFundMe; Co-Founder and former CEO of OpenX

Tim Cadogan is a British-American entrepreneur who is the CEO of GoFundMe. Previously he co-founded OpenX as its CEO. In 2025, Time magazine listed him as one of the world's 100 most influential people.

== Early life and education ==
Cadogan was born and raised in rural England. He holds a bachelor of science degree from the London School of Economics, a master in philosophy from University of Oxford, and is master of business administration from Stanford Graduate School of Business.

== Career ==
Cadogan began his career as a consultant at the Boston Consulting Group and McKinsey & Company. He then became Vice President of Search at Overture (formerly GoTo.com) which was subsequently acquired by Yahoo!. At Yahoo!, he led both the advertising and search businesses at from 2003 to 2008.

In 2008, Cadogan co-founded OpenX with fellow Yahoo veteran Jason Fairchild and was its CEO. In January 2020, Cadogan replaced Rob Solomon as the CEO of GoFundMe.

== Personal life ==
Cadogan resides with his family in California. He has been an active member of the Sierra Madre Search and Rescue team since 2010.
