= OpenX Technologies =

California-based adtech company

OpenX Technologies, Inc.
- Type: Private
- Industry: Online Advertising, Big Data
- Founded: 2008; 18 years ago
- Founder: Tim Cadogan; Jason Fairchild
- Headquarters: Pasadena, California
- Key people: Matt Sattel (CEO); Tim Cadogan (Chairman)
- Products: Ad Server, Ad Exchange, SSP
- Number of employees: 200+
- Website: openx.com

OpenX Technologies, Inc. is an independent omnichannel supply-side platform (SSP) that supports programmatic advertising across connected TV (CTV), mobile apps, mobile web, and desktop inventory. OpenX is an advertising technology provider that offers supply-side curation, media quality controls, and transparency tools for buyers and publishers, in addition to standard SSP functionality.

OpenX has offices in Pasadena (HQ), New York, Tokyo, London, and Kraków.

== History ==
In 1998, OpenX began as an open-source project providing free digital and mobile advertising technology. Their key revenue drivers during this time came from service and tech support.

In 2008, the company commercialized the open-source ad server, appointing Tim Cadogan as its CEO and the first US employee.

In September 2017, OpenX acquired two publisher tools, Mezzobit and PubNation.

In antitrust proceedings, Google's Project Poirot has been described as an internal program that shifted ad transactions toward Google's AdX exchange and away from rival exchanges using header bidding, including OpenX. According to AdExchanger, OpenX laid off 210 employees between October 2018 and March 2019, nearly half of its workforce at the time, following a decline in DV360 demand on its exchange. In January 2019, OpenX announced a five-year agreement with Google Cloud Platform to move its exchange infrastructure fully to the cloud, with its completion expected by Q2 of 2019.

In May 2019, OpenX announced OpenAudience, a people-based marketing product for the open web. The company later described OpenAudience as a supply-side identity graph used for audience activation and targeting. In 2025, OpenX said that its identity graph covered more than 237 million U.S. users and 150 million connected TV devices, and supported targeting across cookies, mobile advertising IDs, authenticated IDs, IP addresses, and other identifiers. AdExchanger has described OpenX's more recent strategy as part of a broader industry shift toward sell-side curation.

In January 2020, OpenX announced that CEO and co-founder Tim Cadogan was leaving to become the CEO of GoFundMe and that President John Gentry would step into the CEO role. This was followed in April by another round of layoffs where 15% of the company was affected.

In December 2021, the Federal Trade Commission announced that OpenX would pay a $2 million fine "to settle allegations that the company violated federal children's privacy law." Originally, the fine was to be $7.5 million, but it was reduced "due to the company's inability to pay."

In August 2025, OpenX filed a lawsuit against Google alleging that "the tech giant engaged in a range of anti-competitive behaviors" in the digital advertising market.

In February 2026, OpenX announced the appointment of Matt Sattel to CEO, after the death of John Gentry the previous month.

== Technology ==
OpenX's platform runs on cloud-based infrastructure and combines ad server data, a real-time bidding exchange, and supply-side platform functions. In 2025, AdExchanger reported that OpenXSelect allowed advertisers to build curated inventory packages using contextual, audience, publisher, and other supply-side targeting options. OpenX has also described OpenXBuild as a software suite that lets advertisers use data and decisioning logic in the OpenX bidstream before activating campaigns through a demand-side platform.

OpenXSelect — OpenXSelect is a curation and supply-side targeting platform for brands, agencies, and data partners. OpenX describes the platform as offering curated inventory, supply-quality controls, direct publisher connections, and audience targeting through its identity graph. AdExchanger reported that OpenXSelect was part of a broader industry shift toward sell-side curation, where supply-side platforms package inventory and data for advertisers. In September 2025, OpenX announced an automated discounting feature for OpenXSelect that applied discounts from participating curation and data partners directly within the platform.

OpenXBuild — OpenXBuild is a suite of APIs for programmatic advertising buyers. The suite includes an Auction Insights API for historical bidstream events, an Identity Resolution API for audience targeting and activation, and a Real-Time Bidstream API that allows advertisers to apply custom logic and models within OpenX's infrastructure. EMARKETER also reported that the APIs were intended to give programmatic buyers more control over ad performance, reach, and insights.

TV by OpenX — TV by OpenX is an initiative focusing on connected TV inventory. When announcing the initiative in 2023, OpenX said it would remove resellers and non-TV content from its CTV inventory pool. The company also stated that TV by OpenX provided access to direct publisher integrations across more than 110 million measurable connected TV devices.
