= AdMob =

Mobile advertising company

AdMob Google Inc.
- Trade name: AdMob
- Type: Subsidiary of Google
- Industry: Mobile advertising
- Founded: April 10, 2006; 20 years ago
- Founder: Omar Hamoui
- Headquarters: Mountain View, California, U.S.
- Parent: Google
- Website: admob.google.com

AdMob Google Inc., doing business as Google AdMob or simply AdMob, is a mobile advertising subsidiary of Google, originally founded by the Syrian entrepreneur Omar Hamoui. The name AdMob is a portmanteau for "advertising on mobile". The company is based in Mountain View, California. In November 2009, it was acquired by Google for $750 million. The acquisition was completed on May 27, 2010. Apple Inc. had also expressed interest in purchasing the company the same year, but they were outbid by Google. Prior to being acquired by Google, AdMob acquired the company AdWhirl, formerly Adrollo, which is a platform for developing advertisements in iPhone applications. AdMob offers advertising options for many mobile platforms, including Android, iOS, webOS, Flash Lite, Windows Phone and all standard mobile web browsers.

On May 16, 2013, Google announced a rebuild of the AdMob platform at their 2013 I/O using technology from their other platforms like AdSense with the goal of helping app developers to build their business.

== History ==
AdMob was incorporated in 2006 while Hamoui was a student at the Wharton School at the University of Pennsylvania.

== AdMob Mafia ==
The acquisition price, paid in Google stock four years after AdMob's incorporation, was distributed to its early hires. Many have since become prolific investors in technology startups, and are known in London as the AdMob Mafia, a reference to the well known PayPal Mafia. In particular Chung Man Tam, Russell Buckley, Jules Maltz and Charles Yim have become very involved in investing and advising startups, with Russell Buckley taking a role advising the British Government on venture investment in the UK's technology ecosystem. AdMob VP of Engineering Kevin Scott went on to become CTO of Microsoft while Sr. Dir of Engineering Mark Schaaf became CTO of Instacart. CFO Cheryl Dalrymple moved on to become CFO of Confluent. GM Japan, John Lagerling became Senior Director of Mobile partnerships at Google Android. Former AdMob team members, Jim Payne and Nafis Jamal, went on to found MoPub, which was acquired by Twitter on September 9, 2013.
