= Supply-side platform =

Technology for producers to market goods and services

Online advertising serving process

A supply-side platform (SSP) or sell-side platform is a technology platform to enable web publishers, connected TV (CTV) publishers, mobile app developers, and digital out-of-home (DOOH) media owners to manage their advertising inventory, fill it with ads, and receive revenue. Supply-side platforms are an integral part of the programmatic advertising ecosystem, enabling the automated selling and optimization of digital media space.

A supply-side platform interfaces on the publisher side to advertising networks and exchanges, which in turn interface to demand-side platforms (DSPs) on the advertiser side.

This system allows advertisers to put online advertising and DOOH advertising before a selected target audience. SSPs send potential impressions into ad exchanges, where DSPs purchase them on marketers' behalf, depending on specific targeting attributes and audience data. By offering impressions to as many potential buyers as possible publishers can maximize the revenue. Therefore, SSPs are sometimes referred to as yield-optimization platforms. In recent years, supply-side platform technology has also been adopted by retail media networks, enabling retailers to monetize their owned digital properties by offering ad inventory to brands through programmatic channels.

Often, real-time bidding (RTB) is used to complete DSP transactions.

Unlike advertising networks that target buyers (advertisers), supply-side platforms provide services for publishers (website, app, and DOOH owners). Supply-side platforms are often integrated into the structure of advertising and ad serving companies, as well as ad exchanges that work with both publishers (supply side) and advertisers (demand side).

== Examples ==
- Equativ
- OpenX
- Sovrn
- PubMatic
- Magnite
- Smaato (now part of Verve)
- SpotX
- Verizon Media
- Xandr (formerly AppNexus)
- Google Ad Manager
- Media.net

== See also ==
- Ad exchange
- Demand-side platform
