= Agent-based commerce =

Form of automated electronic commerce involving AI

Agent-based commerce describes a form of e-commerce in which semi-autonomus and fully autonomous artificial intelligence (AI) agents independently execute purchasing and payment processes on behalf of users or organizations. Unlike conventional digital commerce systems, which require direct human interaction at key decision points, agent-based commerce systems are designed to search for products or services, evaluate options, make purchasing decisions, and complete payments without real-time human involvement.

Agent-based commerce is deeply tied to advertising platforms and their integration with AI chatbots. The idea is to automate purchasing decisions for consumers. This has raised concerns about new mechanisms to defraud consumers at a larger scale, among other criticism.

In March 2026, Tools for Humanity, the company behind World, released AgentKit in beta, a developer toolkit that lets a person with a World ID, created through an Orb iris scan, register an AI agent so that websites can see that a verified, distinct person has approved the agent's purchases. AgentKit extends x402, a blockchain-based payment standard developed by Coinbase and Cloudflare, and the company said websites already using x402 can ask for this proof in addition to, or in place of, micropayments.

== Characteristics ==
A defining feature of agentic commerce is the delegation of end-to-end commercial activities to software agents. These agents typically operate according to predefined user preferences, rules, or constraints, such as price limits, quality criteria, delivery times, or preferred payment methods. Based on these parameters, an agent can autonomously perform tasks including product discovery, price comparison, contract selection, order placement, and payment execution.

In contrast to decision-support systems, which provide recommendations to human users, agentic commerce systems are designed to act independently. Human involvement may be limited to initial configuration, periodic supervision, or exception handling.

== Comparison with traditional and AI-assisted commerce ==
Traditional e-commerce requires users to manually browse products, select offers, and authorize payments. Generative AI systems used in commerce commonly assist users by answering questions or suggesting options, and do not complete transactions autonomously.

Agentic commerce differs in that decision-making authority is partially or fully transferred to AI agents. As a result, the conventional customer journey, characterized by conscious decision points, may be replaced by continuous, automated micro-decisions performed by software.

== Applications and business use cases ==
Potential applications of agentic commerce include recurring purchases, subscription management, business-to-business procurement, inventory replenishment, and price monitoring. In such contexts, transactions are often predictable and standardized, making them suitable for automation. From a business perspective, agentic commerce systems may be used to optimize supply chains, manage inventory levels, negotiate prices algorithmically, or execute transactions across multiple platforms.

Enterprises adopting the new technology include retailers and ad tech companies., including Amazon, and Yahoo. Chinese tech firms are using apps to provide full-service shopping and payment tools. These includs Alibaba, Tencent, and ByteDance who have developed AI shopping apps. The Qwen AI chatbot allows users to complete transactions directly within its interface. US firms are also developing AI models but integration has been slower due to privacy restrictions. Alibaba's international division launched Accio Work, an AI agent for small and medium-sized exporters that can research market demand, compare suppliers and generate product listings.

== Payments and technical infrastructure ==
In 2026, Alipay launched an AI payment processing service, AI Pay, that provides businesses in China to receive payments with autonomous AI agents, including autonomous agents to purchase services. In January 2025, Alipay unveiled the Agentic Commerce Trust Protocol. Qwen adopted the platform first, connecting it to Taobao Instant Commerce and Alipay AI Pay. Users could use Qwen's agentic feature to place food and drink orders within the application instead of having to click outside to an external browser.

For merchants, participation in agentic commerce may require products and services to be presented in structured, machine-readable formats to ensure discoverability and interoperability with autonomous agents.

== Protocols ==
Several technical protocols have been proposed to support interoperability among AI agents, merchants, payment providers and other participants in agentic-commerce systems. These protocols address different parts of a transaction, including product discovery, cart and checkout management, payment authorisation, and the communication of order and fulfilment information.

=== Universal Commerce Protocol (UCP) ===
In January 2026, Google announced the Universal Commerce Protocol (UCP), an open-source web standard intended to enable interoperability between AI agents and retail systems.

=== Agentic Commerce Protocol ===
The Agentic Commerce Protocol (ACP) is an open standard for programmatic commerce flows between buyers, AI agents and merchants. Developed by OpenAI and Stripe, it defines interfaces through which AI agents can access product information, create and manage carts, initiate checkout, delegate authentication and payment credentials, and receive order-status updates.

=== Agent Payments Protocol ===
The Agent Payments Protocol (AP2) is an open protocol for authorising and processing payments initiated by AI agents. Announced by Google in September 2025, AP2 is payment-method agnostic and is designed to work with payment methods including cards, bank transfers and stablecoins.

AP2 uses cryptographically signed records, referred to as mandates, to record and verify a user's instructions and approval for an agent-assisted transaction. Its documentation describes intent mandates, cart mandates and payment mandates as mechanisms for linking a user's authorised intent to a specified purchase and payment action. AP2 is designed to operate alongside agent communication and tool-integration protocols, including Agent2Agent (A2A) and the Model Context Protocol (MCP), rather than to define the full merchant checkout flow itself.

== Legal and security issues ==
Legal issues with agentic commerce include assigning responsibility for unauthorized or erroneous transactions, mechanisms for dispute resolution, standards for agent authentication, and compliance with data protection and financial regulations. Continuous, automated transaction patterns may also require new approaches to security and risk assessment.

In January 2026, Singapore's Infocomm Media Development Authority (IMDA) published the "Model AI Governance Framework for Agentic AI", extending its existing AI governance guidelines to address agent-specific risks including delegation chains and multi-agent coordination.

The Cloud Security Alliance (CSA) has also proposed an Agentic Trust Framework applying zero-trust principles to AI agent governance.

== Ecosystem and implementation ==
Enterprise vendors have addedagent features to their platforms; commercetools, for example, launched AgenticLift in January 2026, which lets a company connect an existing commerce system to AI assistants such as ChatGPT, Google Gemini and Microsoft Copilot without replatforming. Support for agentic commerce has become a point of competition among commerce vendors, and analysts have folded it into their assessments of the sector: in Gartner's 2025 Magic Quadrant for Digital Commerce, Shopify, Salesforce and commercetools were named among the market leaders.

Management consultancies have identified agentic commerce as a structural evolution of digital commerce, emphasizing the role of AI-driven agents in automating discovery, decision-making, and transaction processes across commerce systems. McKinsey & Company has described agentic commerce as a significant shift in how consumers interact with brands and how enterprises design their commerce operating models.

== Market development and outlook ==
Due to the scale of global digital commerce, even limited adoption of agent-based commerce could represent substantial transaction volumes.

A McKinsey study from October 2025 projects that by 2030, the U.S. business-to-consumer retail market could see up to $1 trillion in revenue orchestrated through agent-based commerce. On a global scale, the opportunity could range from $3 trillion to $5 trillion. Adobe Analytics reported that AI-referred traffic to United States retail sites rose 393% year over year in the first quarter of 2026, and that such visits converted roughly 42% better than traffic from other channels which is a reversal from a year earlier, when AI referrals had converted about 38% worse. Gartner forecast that 40% of enterprise applications would embed task-specific AI agents by the end of 2026, up from fewer than 5% in 2025.

Early experiments and pilot projects have demonstrated both the potential and current limitations of the technology.

News coverage of UCP (Universal Commerce Protocol) describe it as a standardized mechanism for AI assistants and conversational interfaces to start and complete purchases without requiring bespoke integrations for each merchant or agent system.

== See also ==
- AI agent
- Programmatic advertising
