= Header bidding =

Mechanism for automatic trading in digital advertising

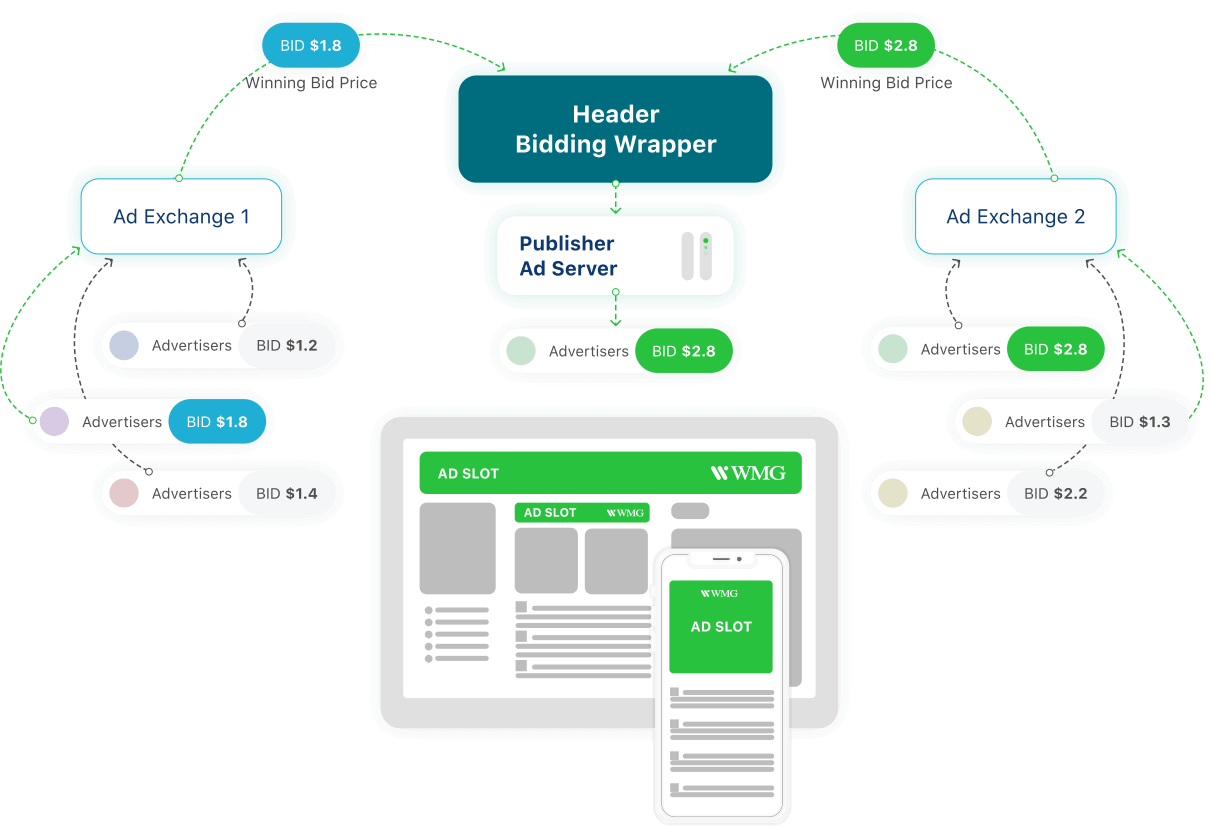
Header bidding dataflow

Header bidding is a programmatic advertising technique in which publishers bid on multiple advertising exchanges in real time. Google has been reported to have referred internally to header bidding as an "existential threat".
