= Demand-side platform =

Automated advertising software

A demand-side platform (DSP) is a concept that combines various software for advertisers (or advertising agencies) to automate the process of buying and selling ad impressions in real time.

A DSP surfaces digital advertising inventory from multiple sources, where an advertiser or agency can manage marketing campaigns by defining the target audience, bid amount, overall budgets, ad format, and other parameters, while getting feedback about ad impressions and audience behavior in the form of campaign reporting.

DSPs are designed to receive signals from, and interact with, supply-side platforms (SSPs), which aggregate inventory, in order to allow advertisers the opportunity to place their ads in the most optimal inventory locations.

Much like paid search, using DSPs allows users to optimize based on set key performance indicators such as effective cost per click (eCPC) and effective cost per action (eCPA).

There are two types of DSPs:

- Full-service is a hands-off management model from the agency-side, in which the planning, launch and optimization of an advertising campaign is carried out by account managers of the DSP platform.
- Self-service, in contrast, is similar to full-service, but management is carried out by the agency or advertiser itself, allowing greater control and autonomy, rather than having account managers of the DSP manage the campaign.

== Properties of the DSP ==
While not all programmatic buying DSPs incorporate algorithms and methods of real-time bidding, it is used in about 90% of programmatic transactions. Features include:

- Extremely high speed of operation (20-400 milliseconds to decision and then bid) — A DSP allows agencies and advertisers to make transactions in real time;
- Wide audience targeting opportunities: direct (or vertical) targeting — by socio-demographic, geographical, temporal, behavioral characteristics, interests, etc. and lateral targeting, which identifies target groups for a specific task with dynamically changing criteria during an advertising campaign;
- Formation of detailed reports on each display, reflecting all the sites involved and the results of their work;
- Realtime statistics: the campaign progress report is reflected with a delay of only a few seconds, which allows you to quickly reduce the cost of inefficient traffic sources;
- Interaction with dozens of SSPs offering for sale advertising inventory of networks and independent platforms, which means unprecedented media coverage;
- The ability to optimize the DSP budget, including automatically. This is especially interesting in the case of buying up "residual traffic".

== Functionality of the DSP ==
Online advertising serving process

The functionality of the DSP often depends on the format of the media. For example, DSPs that advertise online can see how people behave after viewing an ad, whereas this is not possible in outdoor advertising or television and radio, where the advertising constitutes a one-to-many approach.

DSPs incorporate many of the facets previously offered by advertising networks, such as wide access to inventory and vertical and lateral targeting, with the ability to serve ads, real-time bid on ads, track the ads, and optimize. This is all kept within one interface that allows advertisers to control and maximize the impact of their ads. DSPs track frequency information, several forms of rich media ads, and some video metrics.

Many third parties are integrating with DSPs to provide better tracking. In addition, DSPs use advanced price reduction algorithms, commonly known as bid shading, to help advertisers procure ad impressions for a lower cost per thousand impressions (CPM) in the first-price auction.

DSPs are commonly used for retargeting, as it is able to see a large volume of inventory in order to recognize an ad call with a user that an advertiser is trying to reach.

== Types of programmatic buys ==
Programmatic advertising transactions are generally categorized into two main groups: Programmatic Direct and Programmatic Auctions. These differ by the level of automation, price transparency, and type of inventory access.

=== Programmatic Direct ===
Programmatic Direct refers to automated transactions that occur without real-time bidding. Prices and terms are negotiated in advance between the advertiser and publisher through a demand-side platform (DSP) or ad server integration. It includes two primary types:

- Programmatic Guaranteed – The advertiser and publisher agree on a fixed price and a guaranteed number of impressions. The deal is executed programmatically, but without an auction.
- Preferred Deal – The advertiser has priority access to inventory at a fixed price, but impressions are not guaranteed. If the advertiser declines, the inventory can be sold in an auction.

=== Programmatic Auctions ===
Programmatic Auctions involve real-time bidding (RTB) to determine the price of impressions in milliseconds. The process is data-driven and enables dynamic pricing. There are two main types:

- Private Marketplace (PMP) – An invitation-only auction where selected advertisers bid on a publisher’s premium inventory. PMPs provide greater control and transparency than open exchanges.
- Open Exchange – A public RTB marketplace where any advertiser or DSP can bid for available impressions. This method offers scale and efficiency but less transparency compared to private deals.

=== Related Buying Method ===
- Direct IO (Insertion Order) – A traditional digital buying method where the advertiser manually negotiates terms with the publisher. It is not programmatic, but often used as a reference baseline for comparison.

== Examples ==
- Adform – European headquartered advertising technology company offering an integrated DSP, DMP, ad server, and SSP.
- Amazon DSP – Amazon’s demand-side platform for on- and off-Amazon inventory.
- Google DV360 – Google’s enterprise DSP within the Google Marketing Platform.
- Equativ – Formerly Smart AdServer; offers a DSP component (Buyer Connect) and SSP services.
- MediaMath – Relaunched in 2024 under Infillion, offering a modular, composable DSP platform.
- Nexxen – Formed from the integration of Amobee and Tremor International platforms. Offers DSP and SSP.
- The Trade Desk – Global DSP enabling omnichannel programmatic buying.
- Yahoo! Advertising – Yahoo’s omnichannel DSP integrating audience-based targeting.

== See also ==
- Ad exchange
- Supply-side platform
- Ad serving
- Header bidding
- Agentic commerce
