= Advertising inventory =

Advertising inventory or media inventory is the space available in the media, advertising, and marketing industries to advertisers on newspapers, magazines, and digital platforms.

== History ==
Traditionally advertising inventory was sold during upfront events in the third week of May. However, advertising space is increasingly being transacted algorithmically, such as with real-time bidding.

== Categories ==
Media space is typically broken down into four categories, which can be purchased through a variety of sales channels.

- Premium guaranteed
- Audience targeted
- Remnant
- Sponsorships
