= Mobile advertising =

Form of advertising via mobile (wireless) phones

Mobile advertising is a form of advertising via mobile (wireless) phones or other mobile devices. It is a subset of mobile marketing, mobile advertising can take place as text, image or video ads via SMS, or banner advertisements that appear embedded in a mobile web site. It is estimated that global mobile app-installed ads accounted for two-thirds of all mobile advertising revenue in 2023 and made $315 billion. This segment is projected to have a double-digit growth rate until 2027.

One of the most popular ways mobile advertising can be purchased include working with a mobile demand-side platform, in which ad impressions are bought in real-time on an ad exchange.

== Overview ==
Global mobile advertising spending reached approximately $362 billion in 2023, driven primarily by in-app advertising and mobile video formats.

=== Types of mobile ads ===
1. Click-to-download ads: the user will be directed to the App Store or Google Play.
2. Click-to-call ads: the user will call to a phone number after clicking the button.
3. Click-to-message ads: the user will be directed to an texting application to message the advertiser.
4. Image text and banner ads: a click opens your browser and re-directs you to a page.
5. Push notification
6. Pin pull ads: mostly common in Playrix ads.

=== Mobile rich media ===
There are limitations to rich media on mobile because all of the coding must be done in HTML5, since iOS does not support Flash.

==== Handsets display and corresponding ad images ====
There are hundreds of handsets in the market and they differ by screen size and supported technologies (e.g., MMS, WAP 2.0). For color images, formats such as PNG, JPEG, GIF and BMP are typically supported, along with the monochrome WBMP format. The following gives an overview of various handset screen sizes and a recommended image size for each type.

Handset	Approx handset screen size (px W × H)	Example handsets	Ad unit	Ad size (pixels)
X-Large	320 × 320	Palm Treo 700P, Nokia E70	X-Large	300 × 50
Large	240 × 320	Samsung MM-A900, LG VX-8500 Chocolate, Sony Ericsson W910i	Large	216 × 36
Medium	176 × 208	Motorola RAZR, LG VX-8000, Motorola ROKR E1	Medium	168 × 28
Small	128 × 160	Motorola V195	Small	120 × 20

Source: Mobile Marketing Association

== History ==
Martin Cooper invented a portable handset in 1973, when he was a project manager at Motorola. It was almost three decades after the idea of cellular communications was introduced by Bell Laboratories. Two decades later, cellular phones made a commercial debut in the mass market in the early 1990s. In the early days of cellular handsets, phone functionality was limited to dialing, and voice input/output.

When the second generation of mobile telecoms (so-called 2G) was introduced in Finland by Radiolinja (now Elisa) on the GSM standard (now the world's most common mobile technology with over 2 billion users) in 1991, the digital technology introduced data services. SMS text messaging was the first such service. The first person-to-person SMS text message was sent in Finland in December 1994. SMS (Short Message Service) gradually began to grow, becoming the largest data service by number of users in the world, currently with 74% of all mobile subscribers or 2.4 billion people active users of SMS in 2007.

One advantage of SMS is that while even in conference, users are able to send and receive brief messages unobtrusively while enjoying privacy. Even in such environments as in a restaurant, café, bank, travel agency office, and so on, the users can enjoy some privacy by sending/receiving brief text messages in an unobtrusive way.

It would take six years from the launch of SMS until the first case of advertising would appear on this new data media channel, when a Finnish news provider offered free news headlines via SMS, sponsored by advertising. This development led to rapid experimentation in mobile advertising and mobile marketing, and the world's first conference to discuss mobile advertising was held in London in 2000, sponsored by the Wireless Marketing Association (which later merged into the Mobile Marketing Association). The first books to discuss mobile advertising were Ahonen's M-Profits and Haig's Mobile Marketing in 2002. Several major mobile operators around the world launched their own mobile advertising arms, like Aircross in South Korea, owned by the parents of SK Telecom, the biggest mobile operator, or like D2 Communications in Japan, the joint venture of Japan's largest mobile operator, NTT DoCoMo and Dentsu, Japan's largest ad agency.

In May 2010 the US Federal Trade Commission closed its investigation of Google's proposed $750 million acquisition of the mobile ad network AdMob without challenging the deal. The Commission cited Apple's entry into mobile advertising through its December 2009 purchase of Quattro Wireless, then the third-largest mobile ad network, and its introduction of the iAd network.

== Data privacy considerations ==
Targeted mobile marketing requires customization of ad content to reach interested and relevant customers. To customize ad experiences, advertising technologies may leverage behavioral personal data, user profiling, data mining, device fingerprinting, and other tracking methods. Privacy advocates warn that this may cause privacy infringement.

However, many mobile apps use advertising-funded monetization models, which rely on data-driven targeting. In-app advertising accounted for approximately two-thirds of total mobile app revenue in 2025, according to Statista. Mobile users have demonstrated an increased acceptance of ads and willingness to share certain data points with app publishers, given a clear value exchange. A 2025 survey of 4,000 mobile users found that 75% would rather watch an ad than pay for content, up from 67% in 2024. Privacy regulations like GDPR have impacted how users' data can be collected, stored, and used for targeted advertising.

=== Impact of ATT on iOS advertising ===
In its 2020 announcement of iOS 14, Apple introduced Application Tracking Transparency (ATT), which aimed to protect users' privacy by requiring opt-in consent for apps to use IDFA to track users. Without the ability to connect actions to a unique advertising ID, advertisers faced new challenges with targeting, retargeting, and attribution.

Apple had already introduced SKAdNetwork (SKAN), a probabilistic framework for measurement and attribution that did not rely on IDFA, in 2018. Post-ATT, SKAdNetwork became an increasingly important tool for optimizing mobile advertising on iOS, despite challenges caused by delayed postbacks and other technical considerations.

After SKAN 4.0, Apple announced a transition to AdAttributionKit (AAK) in 2025. AAK built upon the existing SKAN framework, with key enhancements like reengagement capabilities.
