= Real-time bidding =

Automated auction for advertisements

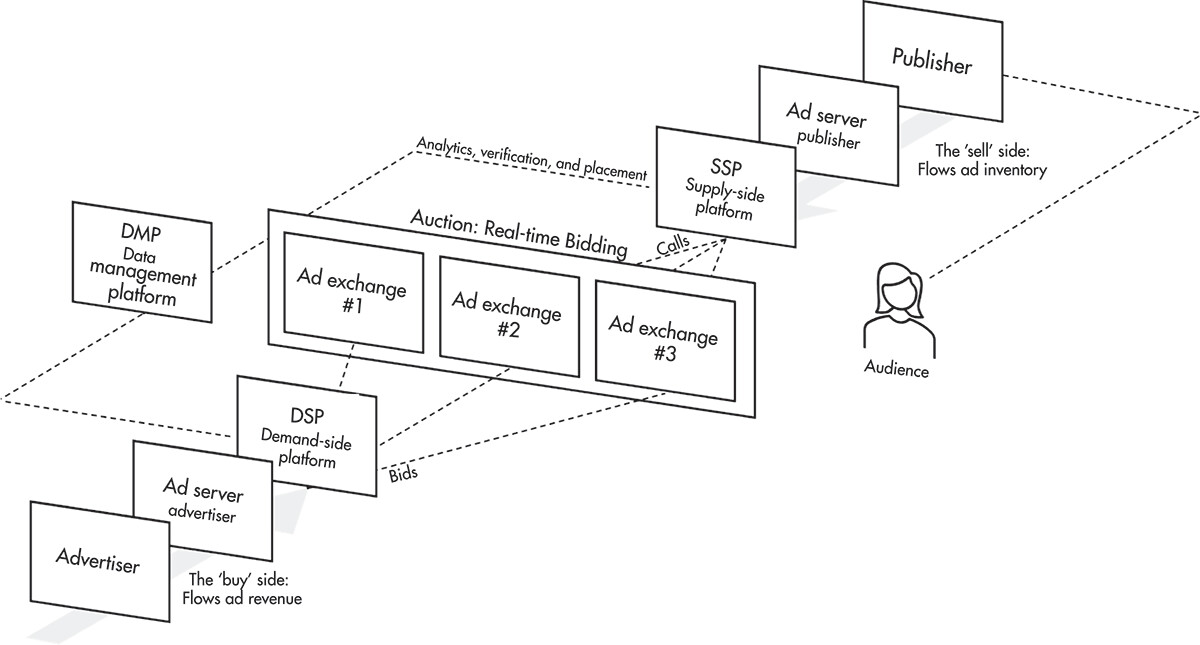
A visualization of the real-time bidding market in online advertising

Real-time bidding (RTB) is a means by which advertising inventory is bought and sold on a per-impression basis, via instantaneous programmatic auction, similar to financial markets. With real-time bidding, online advertising buyers bid on an impression and, if the bid is won, the buyer's ad is instantly displayed on the publisher's site. Real-time bidding lets advertisers manage and optimize ads from multiple ad networks, allowing them to create and launch advertising campaigns, prioritize networks, and allocate percentages of unsold inventory, known as backfill.

Real-time bidding is distinguishable from static auctions by how it is a per-impression way of bidding, whereas static auctions are groups of up to several thousand impressions. RTB is promoted as being more effective than static auctions for both advertisers and publishers in terms of advertising inventory sold, though the results vary by execution and local conditions. RTB replaced the traditional model.

RTB digital advertising spend in the United States reached approximately $57 billion in 2023, up from $23.5 billion in 2018.

== Concerns ==
=== Privacy and security ===
RTB requires collection, accumulation and dissemination of data about users and their activities for both operating the bidding process, profiling users to "enrich" bid requests, and operate ancillary functions such as fraud detection. As a consequence, RTB has led to a range of privacy concerns, and has attracted attention from data protection authorities (DPAs). According to UK's DPA, the ICO, report, companies involved in RTB "were collecting and trading information such as race, sexuality, health status or political affiliation" without consent from affected users. Simon McDougall of ICO reported, in June 2019, that "sharing people’s data with potentially hundreds of companies, without properly assessing and addressing the risk of these counterparties, raises questions around the security and retention of this data."

In 2019, 12 NGOs complained about RTB to a range of regulators in the Union, leading to a decision in February 2022 where the Belgian Data Protection Authority found a range of illegality in aspects of a system used to authorise much of RTB in the EU under the GDPR, the Transparency and Consent Framework produced by the Interactive Advertising Bureau Europe (IAB). The Dutch DPA has since indicated that websites and other actors in the Netherlands should cease using RTB to profile users. The Belgian DPA's decision has been described as "an atomic bomb", with some academic commentators arguing that the RTB would require fundamental restructuring in order for a system such as the TCF to be able to authorise it under the decision.

In October 2026, The Citizen Lab revealed that malicious advertisements deploying zero-click spyware was delivered through an advertising vendor acting as a facilitator for mercenary partners. The lab argued that the vendor, then approved by Google and the IAB, illustrates structural flaws with privacy and security in RTB's online ecosystem.

=== Bankrolling fake news and harmful content ===
Since RTB works through machine-to-machine communication, it has been gamed by malicious actors aiming to extract money from the programmatic commerce of online advertising by monetizing fake news websites and other forms of made-for-advertising websites that extract rents via ad fraud.

== How it works ==
A typical transaction begins with a user visiting a website. This triggers a bid request that can include various pieces of data such as the user's demographic information, browsing history, location, and the page being loaded. The request goes from the publisher to an ad exchange, which submits it and the accompanying data to multiple advertisers who automatically submit bids in real time to place their ads. Advertisers bid on each ad impression as it is served. The impression goes to the highest bidder and their ad is served on the page.

The bidding happens autonomously and advertisers set maximum bids and budgets for an advertising campaign. The criteria for bidding on particular types of consumers can be very complex, taking into account everything from very detailed behavioural profiles to conversion data. Probabilistic models can be used to determine the probability for a click or a conversion given the user history data (aka user journey). This probability can be used to determine the size of the bid for the respective advertising slot.

=== Demand-side platforms ===
Demand-side platforms (DSPs) give buyers direct RTB access to multiple sources of inventory. They typically streamline ad operations with applications that simplify workflow and reporting. DSPs are directed at advertisers. The technology that powers an ad exchange can also provide the foundation for a DSP, allowing for synergy between advertising campaigns.

The primary distinction between an ad network and a DSP is that DSPs have the technology to determine the value of an individual impression in real time (less than 100 milliseconds) based on what is known about a user's history.

=== Supply-side platforms ===
Large publishers often manage multiple advertising networks and use supply-side platforms (SSPs) to manage advertising yield. Supply-side platforms utilize data generated from impression-level bidding to help tailor advertising campaigns. Applications to manage ad operations are also often bundled into SSPs. SSP technology is adapted from ad exchange technology.

=== Challenges with mobile implementation ===
An individual's browser history is more difficult to determine on mobile devices. This is due to technical limitations that continue to make the type of targeting and tracking available on the desktop essentially impossible on smartphones and tablets. The lack of a universal cookie alternative for mobile web browsing also limits the growth and feasibility of programmatic ad buying. Mobile real time bidding also lacks universal standards.

== See also ==
- Ad exchange
- Mobile advertising
- Demand-side platform
- Supply-side platform
- Display advertising
- Header bidding
