= Advertising in video games =

Marketing phenomenon

Advertising in video games is the integration of advertising into video games to promote products, organizations, or viewpoints.

There are two major categories of advertising in video games: in-game advertising and advergames. In-game advertising shows the player advertisements while playing the game, whereas advergames are a type of game created to serve as an advertisement for a brand or product.

Other methods of advertising in video games include in-game product placement and sponsorship of commercial games or other game-related content.

== Categories ==
=== In-game advertising ===
An Adidas billboard is displayed in the foreground of the 1994 video game FIFA International Soccer (also, the electronic board that appears with every goal scored sometimes reads "Panasonic").

In-game advertising is similar to product placement in films and television, where the advertising content exists within the universe of the characters. These forms of product placement are common, which led to the advertisement technique being applied to video games to match evolving media consumption habits. According to the Entertainment Software Association in 2010, 42% of gamers said they play online games one or more hours per week. Game playing is considered active media consumption, which provides a unique opportunity for advertisers. The principal advantages of product placement in gaming are visibility and notoriety. A single in-game advertisement may be encountered by the player multiple times, and advertisers have an opportunity to ally a brand's image with that of a well-received game.

Billboards, storefronts, posters, apparel, vehicles, weapons, fliers, sponsored product placement, and the interplay between the player and these elements in the game allow for a great degree of virtual advertisement. Examples of marketing in video games include brand integration, embedded marketing, recruitment tools, edutainment, and traditional in-game advertising.

According to Forbes, in-game advertising is expected to reach $7.2 billion in 2016. Unlike television commercials and digital ads, which can be avoided by using DVRs and ad-blocking software, advertisements embedded within video games cannot be bypassed. A more recent example of in-game advertising is Google's placement of video ads between levels of games. These ads are usually branded inline, and TechCrunch reports that they have the potential to gain fast traction in Google's AdMob Service.

==== Static in-game advertising ====
Static in-game advertisements are embedded into the video game program. Static ads can be used in the story-line of the game and players can interact with them. The creation of the ads can take from a month or years to reach the public. These ads do not require players to have access to an Internet connection in order to display the campaigns. Limitations include ads becoming outdated or irrelevant as consumer habits change. Because these ads cannot change once released to the public, they also lack the ability to be customized based on player demographics. Examples include billboards advertising for (and product placement of) Bawls energy drink in Fallout: Brotherhood of Steel, and billboards for Adidas sportswear in FIFA International Soccer.

==== Dynamic in-game advertising ====
Dynamic in-game advertisements are embedded in online video games that can be changed at any time by the game programmers. Examples of this type of advertisement would be virtual billboards and updates that introduce new items into the game like clothing brands to dress characters or different cars. Dynamics ads are different from static games because companies can provide ads for specific audiences or demographics after the video game has been purchased by the consumer. This way companies can follow the consumer habits and provide ads that can address a certain context. Game developers then can dynamically change the virtual ads spaces embedded into the game to display the ads. Players have a limited interaction with these ads compared to static in-game ads. These ads required active Internet connection for the game company to showcase the ads. Dynamic ads can accommodate time sensitive campaigns and can be shown immediately. These ads can also provide data to show how well campaigns are doing unlike static in-game ads.

=== Advergames ===
Video games that are expressly commissioned to promote a product or service are referred to as "advergames", a portmanteau of "advertising" and "game". This term was coined in January 2000 by Anthony Giallourakis and later mentioned by Wired's "Jargon Watch" column in 2001. Advergames have been developed for different platforms including company websites, gaming consoles, and more recently, mobile applications and social media platforms. With the growth of the Internet, advergames have proliferated, often becoming the most visited aspect of brand websites and becoming an integrated part of brand media planning. The advergames sector reached $207 million in 2007.

The earliest custom video games featuring integrated brand messages were developed and distributed on floppy disk. These games were distributed for free, often bundled with other products from the company advertised for. The first floppy disk advergames were developed to serve dual purposes—as promotional incentives that drive response and as media that deliver awareness. American Home Foods Chef Boyardee issued one of the earliest floppy-disk advergames. Some brands, like Kool-Aid and Pepsi, created early advergames on gaming platforms. They created advergames for the Atari 2600 and gave out promotional copies. The first in-box CD-ROM cereal box advergames are General Mills's Chex Quest (promoting the Chex brand) and General Mills's All-Star baseball (starring Trix Rabbit and his friends playing baseball against Major League teams and stars).

Commercial examples include advergames funded by Pepsi, 7 Up, NFL, Formula One, and Burger King. Political and military examples of below-the-line (BTL) advergames include recruitment tools like America's Army, intended to boost recruitment for the United States Army, and Special Force, intended to promote Muslim resistance to the state of Israel. Educational advergames are related to serious games and can be considered edumarket gaming or edutainment. Examples include Food Force (made by the United Nations's World Food Program) and Urban Jungle, an educational traffic simulation.

=== Through-the-line advertising ===
I Love Bees makes use of "link-chasing" and is designed to foster viral marketing.

Examples of through-the-line (TTL) advertising in games include "link-chases," ARGs, and viral marketing.

TTL marketing is a form of advertising in video games that involve the use of URL hyperlinks within the game designed to induce the player to visit a web page which then contains BTL advertisements. The technique used to tempt the player into visiting the intended URL varies from game to game. In games like Pikmin 2, the player is given a cryptic message with an accompanying URL designed to pique their curiosity. In games such as Enter the Matrix, Year Zero, I Love Bees, and Lost Experience, URLs make up a part of the background of the game such that certain plot details can only be learned by following the link. The knowledge of such plot details are typically not required to complete the game, but deepen the game story-line for players who follow the links. Websites of this nature often lead players on to other links which again lead to further links, thus earning these games the label "link-chases". Although TTL advertising can be an enjoyable experience for players, excessive "link-chasing" can feel obstructive and discourage them from diving deeper into a game's story-line. In another form, the URL might be part of a stage where a player can see it but it does not affect the plot. For example, in Super Monkey Ball 2, there is a stage where players can see clearly written on an obstacle a URL and the stage's name is even the word URL.

== Industry impact ==
=== Prevalence and efficacy ===
In 2019, a survey conducted by deltaDNA found that 94% of free-to-play video game developers incorporate some form of in-game advertising. Among those, the most common type of advertisement were rewarded videos, which are videos that players can watch to earn in-game prizes. Rewarded videos are shown to be more effective than forced advertising; players are 23% more likely to buy products and 18% more likely to make in-app purchases when shown rewarded videos instead of forced advertising.

The reaction to in-game advertising has been overall positive, with 73% of players being happy with ad-funded games.

The effectiveness of advertising in video games is debated by scholars. Brand name recognition in sports game has been shown to be low among college students, although players did retain fragments of the brand names. Another study found that 35% of players could recall advertised brands in car racing games. Interactive in-game advertisements, such as brand products that are used in game, are shown to produce greater brand awareness and more positive brand attitudes than passively added advertisements, such as posters or billboards.

=== Mobile ===
Mobile in-game advertisements are advertisements within mobile games that lead the user to the website or installation page of the advertised product or software upon being clicked. Mobile gaming advertisements can take different forms, including banner ads, pop-up ads, video ads, and interactive ads. Banner ads will display on portions of the screen while the user continues to interact with the mobile game. Pop-up ads will display the advertisement on the entire mobile screen, typically disrupting gameplay; they appear between loading screens or when in-game milestones are completed, only allowing users to close the pop-up ad once a timer runs out. Video ads will display a video advertisement of the advertised products on the entire mobile screen. Interactive ads are a form of pop-up ad that allows the user to interact with the advertisement. For instance, Candy Crush Saga, a free-to-play mobile game, uses playable ads to advertise their game on other mobile applications and provide potential customers with a demo of their game. In 2019, mobile advertising contributed $39.9 billion in revenue to the mobile gaming industry.

=== ESRB ===
The Entertainment Software Rating Board (ESRB) assigns ratings based on a detailed questionnaire about the game's content and a gameplay clip provided by the publisher. Possible rating categories are "Everyone", "Everyone 10+", "Teen", "Mature 17+", and "Adults Only 18+". Ratings are supplemented with content descriptions, such as "Blood", "Partial Nudity", and "Use of Alcohol". All updates and downloadable content (DLC), including both static and dynamic in-game advertising, are expected to be compliant with the game's rating and descriptors, though DLC can be submitted for its own, independent rating if necessary.

If any post-release content is determined to be incompatible with the rating of the base game, publishers are required to update all physical and digital displays of the rating. In the case of physical games, where it is difficult to make these modifications once a game has shipped, sanctions and fines may be levied on the publisher.

The ESRB also includes an Advertising Review Council (ARC) that oversees the marketing of video games in the United States and Canada. Cross-promotion, including when a video game is promoted within another, falls under this umbrella. The ARC ensures that the game being advertised is accurately represented and is not being marketed toward parties below the suitable age range.

== Legislative developments ==
=== Academic research ===
The University of Bath's Institute for Policy Research researched the use of advergames in marketing to children in the United Kingdom. The report, published in June 2014, suggested that children as old as 15 did not recognize that advergames were adverts and had their food choices influenced without their conscious awareness. Based on these findings, the university called for "urgent government action to protect children from the subconscious effects of advergames."

=== United States legislation ===
==== Children's Online Privacy Protection Act of 1998 ====
The Children's Online Privacy Protection Act of 1998 (COPPA) directs the Federal Trade Commission (FTC) to protect the personal data collected from children online. Operators of websites or online services are barred from handling the personal information of children under the age of 13 without verifiable consent from a parent or guardian. Restrictions apply to any website or online service that is targeted toward children or has knowledge that it is collecting data from children.

==== Do Not Track Kids Acts ====
Representatives Edward Markey [D-MA] and Joe Barton [R-TX] proposed the Do Not Track Kids Act of 2011 as an amendment to COPPA. The bill would have extended COPPA to prohibit companies from distributing personal and geolocation information knowingly collected from minors for use in targeted advertising. It also expands the restrictions enumerated in the act to both online and mobile applications, which had previously been omitted.

Regarding his motivation for co-sponsoring the Act, Representative Barton reflected, "We have reached a troubling point in the state of the business when companies that conduct business online are so eager to make a buck, they resort to targeting our children."

Since the death of the 2011 bill, Markey and Barton have continued to spawn similar Do Not Track Kids legislation in both chambers of Congress. These bills were proposed in 2013, 2015, and 2018, though none of them passed through the committee stage.

==== Targeted advergame marketing ====
A bill was recently introduced in the Senate that proposes restrictions on the use of information obtained through advergames to market to children. Some games ask users to provide personal information, such as name, gender, and age, then display targeted advertisements based on these characteristics. This bill would prevent companies from using this information to change the game to target certain age brackets.

== Examples ==
=== Food and beverages ===
- Mattel's M Network division released the "promogame" Kool-Aid Man for the Atari 2600 and Intellivision in 1983. The game was originally available only via mail order by sending in UPC symbols from Kool-Aid containers, but later became available for retail purchase.
- Purina had a mail-in offer for the Atari 2600 game Chase the Chuck Wagon for customers of Chuck Wagon dog food in 1983.
- Johnson & Johnson released an Atari 2600 game called Tooth Protectors in 1983, also by mail-order.
- Coca Cola Kid was a Japan-exclusive platform game released in 1994 for the Sega Game Gear. The game stars Cokey, a mascot who appeared in Coca-Cola's Japanese commercials of the 1990s.
- In 1999, Pepsiman was released by developer KID in only Japan for the PlayStation. It focuses the player on avoiding obstacles to save dehydrated people by bringing them a can of Pepsi.
- In November 2006, Burger King began selling three advergaming Xbox and Xbox 360 titles for an additional $3.99 ($4.99 in Canada) each with any value meal. Known as the King Games series, these games include Sneak King (Xbox, 2006), PocketBike Racer (Xbox, 2006), and Big Bumpin' (Xbox 360, 2006). They were all developed by Blitz Games' Blitz Arcade Division and were the best selling games of the 2006 holiday season. More than 3.2 million copies are believed to have been sold in the US and Canada alone.
- Life Savers launched the web's first major advergaming portal, Candystand, in March 1997. The website was acquired from the Wrigley Company by Funtank in August 2008 and hosts advergames for a broad range of brands.
- Doritos sponsored the advergame Doritos Crash Course, which was released on the Xbox 360 in December 2010. The game included fifteen 2.5D obstacle courses for the player's Xbox Avatar to navigate. The game's sequel, Doritos Crash Course 2, was released on Xbox Live Arcade in May 2013.
- In 2011, Sony Interactive Entertainment and Subway launched an ad campaign that allowed players to access the multiplayer mode of Uncharted 3 a month prior to its release date. Players could earn in-game items such as a Subway uniform or sandwich. The main character of the Uncharted series also explicitly references the Subway five dollar footlong.
- In 2019, Sony Interactive Entertainment and Monster Energy launched an ad campaign in the PlayStation 4 title Death Stranding, in which the protagonist is able to consume the energy drink for a boost to their stamina meter.

=== Movies and entertainment ===
- Cineplex Entertainment features an advergame open to the public, known as Top Popper during non-contest periods and Peel and Pop during contest periods. In the cinemas, there is a TimePlay advergame that plays before the show.
- Fortnite and Marvel Entertainment teamed up in 2018 to promote Avengers: Infinity War by bringing Thanos, the film's antagonist, into the battle royale game. A limited-time game mode allowed one player at a time to become Thanos, giving them several new abilities and a regenerating shield.

=== Cross-franchise promotion ===
- Mario & Sonic at the Olympic Games (2007) was a collaboration between Nintendo and Sega that put their mascots head-to-head in a series of Olympic events. The game was developed for both the Nintendo Wii and the Nintendo DS and received several sequels.
- In 2019, Nintendo announced a collaboration with Microsoft to debut the tag team of Banjo and Kazooie as a playable fighter in Super Smash Bros. Ultimate. Players can add the duo to their roster by purchasing it as DLC.

=== Miscellaneous ===
- BMW's BMW M3 Challenge (online, 2008) includes both ATL- and BTL-form advergaming. BMW worked with 10tacle Studios to repurpose the GT Legends game, a race simulation game, to showcase the 2008 BMW M3.
- In 2008, President Obama's campaign paid for billboard ads in the online game Burnout Paradise to promote his presidential bid.
- Adventurize.com launched the first advertising network to display ads inside of Minecraft servers in 2013.
- In 2014, Nintendo partnered with Mercedes-Benz to bring some of the automaker's cars to Mario Kart 8 as drivable vehicles via a DLC pack.
- In 2014 and 2015, British games retailer Game released a pair of advergames, Christmas Shopper Simulator and Christmas Shopper Simulator 2: Black Friday, to coincide with the Christmas shopping season.
- In 2017, Square Enix and Nissin Foods partnered to launch an ad campaign to bring Cup Noodle-branded DLC to Final Fantasy XV, with in-game items including a hat shaped like a Cup Noodle cup.

== See also ==
- In-game advertising
- Game advertising
- Interactive advertising
- Massive Incorporated
- Product placement
