= Interactive advertising =

Promotions using interactive media

Interactive advertising uses online or offline interactive media to communicate with consumers and to promote products, brands, services, public service announcements, and corporate or political groups.

In the inaugural issue of the Journal of Interactive Advertising, editors Li and Leckenby (2000) defined interactive advertising as the "paid and unpaid presentation and promotion of products, services and ideas by an identified sponsor through mediated means involving mutual action between consumers and producers". This is most commonly performed through the internet; often through the use of an ad server that can deliver a variety of interactive advertising units.

== Objectives ==
The goals of interactive advertising are usually akin to the traditional objectives of advertising, i.e. to sell a product. This in turn means that many of the traditional elements of advertising impact and effectiveness remain relevant, even within the scope of interactive media. However, according to the Journal of Interactive Advertising 2001, interactive advertising also has some properties that expand the range of potential objectives and that improve advertising effectiveness. Interactive advertising also has the potential to decrease the losses associated with poorly coordinated advertising, to reduce the difficulties commonly encountered in clearly communicating an advertising message and to help overcome new product hurdles.

== Advantages ==
- Interactive advertising allows consumers to interpret advertisements in unique ways, and sheds light on the increasing significance of the consumer's role in determining the value of marketing campaigns in modern society.
- Interactive advertising encourages consumers to actively engage in the marketing communications themselves to input feedback, neglect irrelevant elements, and absorb content that appeals to them.
- As consumerism becomes more prominent within the global economy and social interactions become more significant in establishing long-term relationships with consumers, interactive advertising also grows in importance because it triggers greater motivation for social interaction between potential consumers and suppliers.

== Disadvantages ==
- Whilst interactive advertising may be appealing to a prepared audience, it is difficult, costly and time-consuming to prepare, especially for target markets that have yet to be properly identified and analyzed.
- Interactive advertising has greater benefits in industries where creativity helps to capture the attention of buyers. In some markets however, there is little room for this, and excessive use of creativity can become a form of noise that disrupts the conveying of intended messages to consumers.

== Elements ==
There are many different facets to interactive advertising, including varying methods and types. Using many different types of cognitive tools and advert presentations, organizations can enhance the impact of their campaigns with this type of advertising. According to Thorson (1999), all advertisements can be classified into one of five basic categories, including product/service, public service announcement, issue, corporate and political. Advert types also interact with the user's motives to influence outcomes, or consumer responses, reinforcing the need for Interactive Advertising as a means of persuading potential consumers and target audiences.

== User generated/controlled aspects ==
Functions, Internet motives and mode are the main factors of user controlled aspects. In fact, a number of researchers and practitioners argue that consumers have more control on the Internet than do advertisers (Roehm & Haugtvedt, 1999). Some have gone so far as to argue that interactive marketing and advertising techniques will not work unless practitioners "step into the shoes" of and approach the Internet from the consumer's vantage point (Cross & Smith, 1997).

== Advertiser controlled aspects ==
Various aspects of Internet advertising are under the control of the advertiser. Most of these variables include structural elements, such as ad types, formats and features. This does not mean that consumers never control the structure of the interactive ads. Display ads, companion ads, sponsored posts, hyperlinks and non-carrier websites are examples of advertiser controlled interactive advertising.

== See also ==
- Advergaming – Practice where video games are used for promotion
- Advertainment
- Augmented reality – Form of 3D computer interaction merging the real world with virtual objects
- Digital marketing – Marketing of products or services using digital technologies or digital tools
- Immersive advertising – Virtual pet site
- In-game advertising – Advertising in electronic games
- Innovid – American online advertising technology company
- View-through rate – Metric for online advertising campaign
