= Advertainment =

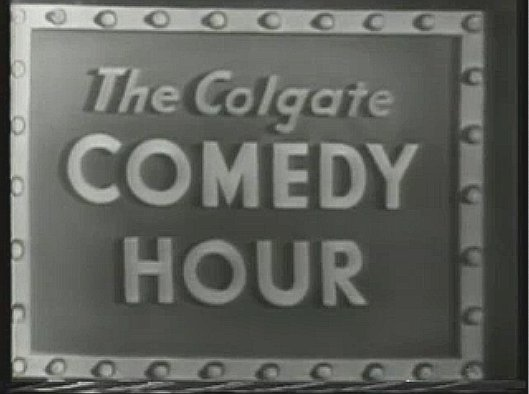
Title card from the "Colgate Comedy Hour."

Advertainment is a term used to reflect the intertwining relationships between advertising and entertainment. Typically it refers to media that combines various forms of entertainment (television, movies, songs, etc.) with elements of advertising to promote products or brands. An example would be product placement in a film. The word is a portmanteau of advertising and entertainment.

Advertainment has become increasingly popular over the years and is now used in a variety of formats, including films, television programs, video games, music and books. Advertainment can be an effective way to reach a wide audience and to create greater brand engagement. However, it is important to use advertainment in a responsible and non-intrusive way.

The origin of the term is uncertain. Its first known appearance was in a 1999 essay written by Patrizia Musso, an Italian university professor, and an expert in branding and advertising.

In contrast to branded entertainment, which does not necessarily need to be a promotion for the brand, advertainment is considered a proper form of advertising.

== History ==
Marketers' approach to using entertainment content to promote their products dates back to the use of branded products in early motion pictures. It represented a cooperative venture between a filmmaker and a company in which on-screen exposure of a product, off-screen endorsement by an actor, or a combination of those were traded for paid advertising and unpaid promotions by the company. Often products were offered for use in films in return for publicity stills for use in companies’ advertising. The first film to win an Academy Award for Best Picture, Wings (1927), featured a prominent placement of Hershey's candy.

Companies commonly sponsored radio programs, and sometimes even helped write them to include product pitches, as with Ovaltine flavored milk supplement and the Little Orphan Annie radio show. Early television programs sometimes included branding in the name of the programs, such as The Colgate Comedy Hour, Texaco Star Theatre or even Camel News Caravan. Advertiser-sponsored programming began to fall from favor with quiz-show scandals of the late 1950s, which involved sponsors. This gave rise to commercial breaks and produced 60-second or 30-second ads.

A transcendent instance of product placement, one aspect of advertainment, involved the 1982 hit movie E.T. the Extra-Terrestrial. The Mars candy company rejected an offer to feature M&M's in the Steven Spielberg blockbuster. Hershey (the sponsor involved in the Wings promotion 55 years before) provided Reese's Pieces, and its product's sales dramatically increased, perhaps as much as 300%. Other companies attempted to replicate Hershey's brand-placement success to increase awareness of their brands and generate sales. FedEx gained exceptional brand placement in the 2000 Tom Hanks film Cast Away, and in an unusual arrangement paid nothing for the exposure. The plot involves a fatal crash of FedEx planes, and the company agreed to that negative exposure in return for significant brand presence, even provided filming locations at its package sorting hubs in Memphis, Los Angeles and Moscow, as well as airplanes, trucks, uniforms and logistical support. The increasing popularity of the usage of integrated advertising in films has further grown in recent years as a way to remain present in consumers' minds despite new technology that enables consumers' to largely avoid traditional commercials. Consumers have the ability to avoid such messaging through the commercial skipping feature applied in some Digital Video Recorders (DVR) or simply by switching channels. This has fueled an exponential growth of advertainment in recent years. A Microsoft Surface placement on the television show NCIS shows use of the tablet, for instance.

A growing venue for advertainment is video games, sometimes called "advergaming", where product placement and partnerships may take a more dynamic role, according to researchers. The variables of gaming within ongoing competition may make players more perceptive or active in the face of advertainment. Advergaming examples include billboards advertising for (and product placement of) Bawls energy drink in Fallout: Brotherhood of Steel, and billboards for Adidas sportswear in FIFA International Soccer. Gamers' attitudes about in-game promotions vary greatly from tolerant to highly resistant.

== Modern examples ==
Advertainments follow the typical narrative patterns of television fiction: through a series of successive commercials, a serialized story is told, which enriches the plot with details each time and, at the same time, presents a new product. It is, therefore, a widely used solution to provide continuous updates on various mobile phone services without boring the viewers.

The first example of advertainment is a commercial created by the advertising agency Lowe for the British department stores Tesco; the first Italian example, instead, is represented by the Telecom commercials "A phone call extends life" (1993) featuring Massimo Lopez, who, from episode to episode, managed to postpone his own execution by requesting as a last wish to make a phone call.

== Production ==
Global branded entertainment revenues reached a record $73.27 billion in 2014, according to media analysts PQ Media. A consequence of the increased popularity of advertainment is the boom of a specialized product placement industry. Product placement has become an institutionalized industry, as evidenced by the creation of professional associations, such as the Entertainment Resource Marketing Association and Branded Content Marketing Association. The professional associations are relatively new and consist of different types of agencies that range in type and size. These agencies also vary in the ways in which companies and studios deal with product placement.

The production side

In an advertainment contractual arrangement including product placement, scripts are often sent to producers of television programs, movies or music who are required to use brands in their scenes. Product placements such as these often are bundled with traditional ads and online ads. Some writers and directors object to such arrangements, fearing the plot will seem contrived or lack interest for audiences. In 2005, television writers protested during advertising week demanding more input and profit with and from product placement deals.

The agency side

Advertising agencies act as "middlemen" between the production and client sides, arranging contracts. Agencies have argued that advertainment is now needed because television viewers today are skipping commercials entirely with digital video recorders.

== Strategic considerations ==
Advertising executives state that successful advertainment depends on integrating a product within entertainment that audiences want to watch. Redbull's collaboration in the record-breaking space jump from 127,900 feet is cited in the advertising industry as an example of advertainment as compelling content. Earlier, it was easier to place advertainments as they were considered “value-added propositions” and were free. Today, it is more elaborate and requires extensive work, planning, and domain expertise. Advertainment can have other roles in society. It can communicate social welfare messages, such as carrying safe-sex messages to developing countries through radio dramas. This type of advertainment is known as edutainment.

== Legal Considerations ==
In the United States, there are few recent regulations surrounding advertainment. However, there are sponsorship disclosure laws that can be loosely applied from the Radio Act of 1927, where radio broadcasters were required to identify the sponsors of their programs. There are additional regulations in Section 317 of the 1934 Communications Act, where broadcasters are required to disclose any “service or other valuable consideration” that is “directly or indirectly paid, or promised to or charged or accepted by” those producing the program, unless the consideration was offered free of charge. The Federal Communications Commission (FCC) has also ruled that on-screen disclosure “should be” in the end credits, but this is rarely enforced. The Federal Trade Commission (FTC) has regulations surrounding deceptive advertising, but they also state that advertainment does not make ‘objective claims’ about a product, so the rules do not apply. Some consumer groups have advocated for stronger regulation, however no new regulations have been passed.

== Ethical Considerations ==
Consumer Perspective

Advertainment has been compared to subliminal messaging in advertising. Consumer advocacy groups argue that advertainment is deceptive in part because it can be so subtle that sometimes consumers do not even recognize the fact they have just viewed a commercial. The dangers to consumers are tangible, critics argue, and consumers require added sophistication to address them. "Deceptive marketing harms consumers’ health, welfare and financial resources, reduces people's privacy and self-esteem, and ultimately undermines trust in society. Individual consumers must try to protect themselves from marketers’ misleading communications by acquiring personal marketplace deception-protection skills that go beyond reliance on legal or regulatory protections," wrote the authors of "Deception In The Marketplace: The Psychology of Deceptive Persuasion and Consumer Self-Protection." Where children are concerned, many parents believe the idea of explicit advertainment is unfair because the target audience is perceived as vulnerable and unable to make informed decisions on their own. Despite this, the FTC has ruled that children are no different than adults in perception, and advertainment in children's programming does not violate any regulations. Parents have been increasingly vocal about advertainment in children's movies and programs, arguing that children do not have the understanding that adults do regarding the product that their favorite star is using. A proposed solution is for advertisers or producers of children's programming to openly state when a show contains embedded advertisement, much like a ratings system. Transparency seems to be the underlying issue regarding both ethical and legal aspects of advertainment; the broadly accepted solution to the ethical dilemma is overwhelmingly disclosure of embedded advertainment to viewers.

Advertiser Perspective

With the increase in DVR use and on-demand services like Hulu and Netflix, many advertisers believe advertainment is their only option as viewers fast forward through previously recorded commercials. A well-placed product during a heavily watched television program can bring as much if not more advertising dollars and may be the only way to reach customers if commercials are skipped. The field of advertainment is risky, however, with consumer attitudes about it varying greatly.

== See also ==
- Product placement
- In-game advertising
- Advergame
- Advertorial
- Immersive advertising
- Edutainment
- Branded Entertainment

== General references ==
1. Fields, Tim; Cotton, Brandon (2011-12-12). Social Game Design: Monetization Methods and Mechanics. Taylor & Francis. pp. 163–. ISBN 9780240817668. Retrieved 6 December 2013.
2. Millili, Judy (2012) A Generational Analysis: Exploring the Effectiveness of Advertainment Marketing Techniques on Consumers. 8–9
3. Graser, M. & T. L. Stanley (2005), “Lessons From Madison & Vine,” Advertising Age, 76(40).
4. Fruitkin, A. (2006), “ Advanced Placement,” Adweek, 48 (18), SR4.
5. Stilson, J, (2007), “Talk to the BRAND,” Adweek, 48(12).
6. Singhal, A. and Rogers, E. M. (2002), “A Theoretical Agenda for Entertainment- Education,” Communication Theory, 117–135.
7. Fitzgerald, K. (2003) “Growing Pains for Placements,” Advertising Age 74 (5).
8. Friedman, M. (1985), “The Changing Language of a Consumer Society: Brand Name Usage in Popular American Novels in the Postwar Era,” Journal of Consumer Research, 11, 927–938.
9. Cornell University Law School. (n.d.). Retrieved October 18, 2015, from 47 U.S. Code § 317 - Announcement of payment for broadcast: https://www.law.cornell.edu/uscode/text/47/317
10. Cristel Antonia Russell, P. (2007). Advertainment: Fusing Advertising and Entertainment. University of Michigan. Ann Arbor, MI: University of Michigan, Yaffe Center.
11. Goodman, M. (2001). The radio act of 1927: progressive ideology, epistemology, and praxis. Communication Abstracts, 28(3), 25–26.
12. Gupta, P. B., & Gould, S. J. (1997). Consumers' Perceptions of the Ethics and Acceptability of Product Placements in Movies: Product Category and Individual Differences. Journal of Current Issues and Research in Advertising, 19(1), 37–50.
13. Hackley, C., Tiwsakul, R. A., & Preuss, L. (2008). An ethical evaluation of product placement: a deceptive practice? Business Ethics: A European Review, 17(2), 109–120.
14. Hudson, S., Hudson, D., & Peloza, J. (2008). Meet the Parents: A Parents' Perspective on Product Placement in Children's Films. Journal of Business Ethics, 80, 289–304.
