= United Nations Humanitarian Response Depot =

The United Nations Humanitarian Response Depot (UNHRD) is a humanitarian platform and network of hubs strategically located around the world, that provide supply chain solutions to the international humanitarian community. The hubs are located in Brindisi (Italy), Dubai (UAE), Accra (Ghana), Panama City (Panama) and Kuala Lumpur (Malaysia).

It is managed by the World Food Programme and currently serves 86 partners, such as UN organizations, government agencies and NGOs. It enables these partners to assist people affected by natural disasters or other complex emergencies by prepositioning vital relief items and allowing them to be dispatched rapidly to critical areas. In addition, the UNHRD network offers services and knowledge that allow various humanitarian partners to fulfill their missions rapidly and effectively.

== Background ==
Today's UNHRD Network dates back to an initiative by the Italian government in the mid-1980s: to pre-position relief items and support equipment for humanitarian operations at its military airport facilities. Expanding on the success of this method and envisioning a global network, WFP transformed the humanitarian depot into a logistic hub for emergency preparedness and response. In line with the United Nations Reforms for better-coordinated development system and more effective humanitarian structures, UNHRD enhances the efficiency and effectiveness of humanitarian assistance, with the specific mandate to "assist the population living in countries affected by natural disasters or complex emergencies, through a prepositioning of relief and survival items and their rapid demobilization to the affected countries."

== History ==
The original UNHRD depot was inaugurated in Brindisi in the year 2000 to replace the United Nations Supply Depot (UNSD) in Pisa, then managed by the Office of Coordination of Humanitarian Affairs (OCHA). Upon the decision of the Inter-Agency Standing Committee (IASC), the mandate to provide rapid and accessible stockpiling and demobilisation services to partners inside and outside the United Nations was transferred from OCHA to WFP. Subsequently, the hub was moved to the military airport at Brindisi in an effort to set up a new and robust logistics platform, available to all partners as a "shared resource".

In 2006, based on its own requirements and that of its partners, WFP replicated the successful Brindisi model by setting up further emergency response facilities in strategic locations worldwide, creating a network of HRDs in Africa, the Middle East, South East Asia and Latin America. Each of these locations has been selected to provide easy access to an airport, port and road systems, making access to a wide range of transportation methods available and allowing for consistently low response times of 24-48 hours.

== Functions ==
When Governments, UN agencies and NGOs look to respond quickly and efficiently to a disaster, they call on emergency supplies that are immediately available in UNHRD warehouses. By prepositioning relief items, the humanitarian community can support affected people at the very beginning of an emergency, often saving lives within the first 24–48 hours. UNHRD offers a range of supply chain solutions to relief organizations around the globe, acting as a 'one-stop-shop' to its partners for storage, procurement, transport, handling, stock borrowing, technical field assistance and training centre facilities.

== Figures ==
Originally, five humanitarian organisations relied on the UNHRD Network, including the WFP itself. This number has since grown to 86 in 2017. Partner organisations that join the network are diverse, spanning UN agencies, governmental and non-governmental organisations.

In 2017, the UNHRD Network managed 575 shipments in 95 countries supporting 36 partners in responding to humanitarian emergencies, including Hurricane Irma, the Rohingya Refugees Crisis in Bangladesh, and the South Sudanese Refugee Crisis in Uganda.

== See also ==
- United Nations
- World Food Programme
- United Nations Humanitarian Air Service
- Asia Emergency Response Facility
