= Video Ad Serving Template =

Metadata format for video advertising

Video Ad Serving Template (VAST) is a specification defined and released by the Interactive Advertising Bureau (IAB) that sets a standard for communication requirements between ad servers and video players in order to present video ads.

It is a data structure declared using XML.

VAST has 8 versions: 1.0 (deprecated), 1.1 (deprecated), 2.0, 2.0.1 (the schema version as the official VAST 2.0 schema), 2.6, 3.0, 4.0, 4.1 and 4.2.

== Request ==
In order to play a video ad in a video player, the video player sends a request to a VAST ad server.

It is a simple HTTP based URL that typically appears as follows:

https://www.example.com/?LR_PUBLISHER_ID=1331&LR_CAMPAIGN_ID=229&LR_SCHEMA=vast2-vpaid

== Response ==
The ad server responds with a VAST data structure that declares these parameters:

- The ad media that should be played
- How the ad media should be played
- What should be tracked as the media is played
- The companion ad that should be displayed alongside the master ad

For example, the above request returns the following response (trimmed):

 <?xml version="1.0" encoding="utf-8"?>
 <VAST version="2.0">
    <Ad id="229">
    	<InLine>
    		<AdSystem version="4.9.0-10">LiveRail</AdSystem>
    		<AdTitle><![CDATA[LiveRail creative 1]]></AdTitle>
    		<Description><![CDATA[]]></Description>
    		<Impression id="LR"><![CDATA[http://t4.liverail.com/?metric=impression&cofl=0&pos=0&coid=135&pid=1331&nid=1331&oid=229&olid=2291331&cid=331&tpcid=&vid=&amid=&cc=default&pp=&vv=&tt=&sg=&tsg=&pmu=0&pau=0&psz=0&ctx=&tctx=&coty=0&adt=0&scen=&url=http%3A%2F%2Fwww.longtailvideo.com%2Fsupport%2Fopen-video-ads%2F23120%2Fwhat-is-vast%2F&cb=1259.192.118.68.5.0.690&ver=1&w=&wy=&x=121&y=121&xy=0b79&z2=0]]></Impression>
 			.......
 		    <Creatives>
 			    <Creative sequence="1" id="331">
            		<Linear>
            			<Duration>00:00:09</Duration>
 	                    <TrackingEvents>
        	                <Tracking event="firstQuartile"><![CDATA[http://t4.liverail.com/?metric=view25&pos=0&coid=135&pid=1331&nid=1331&oid=229&olid=2291331&cid=331&tpcid=&vid=&amid=&cc=default&pp=&vv=&tt=&sg=&tsg=&pmu=0&pau=0&psz=0&ctx=&tctx=&coty=0&adt=0&scen=&url=http%3A%2F%2Fwww.longtailvideo.com%2Fsupport%2Fopen-video-ads%2F23120%2Fwhat-is-vast%2F&cb=1259.192.118.68.5.0.690&ver=1&w=&wy=&x=&y=&xy=]]></Tracking>
                            <Tracking event="midpoint"><![CDATA[http://t4.liverail.com/?metric=view50&pos=0&coid=135&pid=1331&nid=1331&oid=229&olid=2291331&cid=331&tpcid=&vid=&amid=&cc=default&pp=&vv=&tt=&sg=&tsg=&pmu=0&pau=0&psz=0&ctx=&tctx=&coty=0&adt=0&scen=&url=http%3A%2F%2Fwww.longtailvideo.com%2Fsupport%2Fopen-video-ads%2F23120%2Fwhat-is-vast%2F&cb=1259.192.118.68.5.0.690&ver=1&w=&wy=&x=&y=&xy=]]></Tracking>
                           	.......
                        </TrackingEvents>         
                        <VideoClicks>
            		     	<ClickThrough><![CDATA[http://t4.liverail.com/?metric=clickthru&pos=0&coid=135&pid=1331&nid=1331&oid=229&olid=2291331&cid=331&tpcid=&vid=&amid=&cc=default&pp=&vv=&tt=&sg=&tsg=&pmu=0&pau=0&psz=0&ctx=&tctx=&coty=0&adt=0&scen=&url=http%3A%2F%2Fwww.longtailvideo.com%2Fsupport%2Fopen-video-ads%2F23120%2Fwhat-is-vast%2F&cb=1259.192.118.68.5.0.690&ver=1&w=&wy=&x=&y=&xy=&redirect=http%3A%2F%2Fliverail.com%2F]]></ClickThrough>
            			</VideoClicks>
                        <MediaFiles>
        				    <MediaFile delivery="progressive" bitrate="256" width="480" height="352" type="video/x-flv"><![CDATA[http://cdn.liverail.com/adasset4/1331/229/331/lo.flv]]></MediaFile>
        				    ......
    				    </MediaFiles>
    				    ......
    				</Linear>
    			</Creative>
    		</Creatives>
    	</InLine>
    </Ad>
 </VAST>

== See also ==
- Interactive Advertising Bureau
