= Yo! Noid 2: Enter the Void =

2017 video game

- Developer: Dustin Bragg
- Engine: Unity
- Platform: Microsoft Windows: macOS
- Release: Windows; WW: August 1, 2017; Remastered Build; WW: June 28, 2018
- Genre: Platform
- Mode: Single-player

Yo! Noid 2: Enter the Void is a freeware platformer fangame developed by Dustin Bragg and a team of indie developers for Waypoint's 2017 New Jam City game jam. It was released on August 1, 2017, and received a remastered update titled Yo! Noid 2: Game of a Year Edition on June 28, 2018. The game is a parody of, and unofficial sequel to, Yo! Noid, a 1990 platformer redesigned as an advergame for American audiences to promote Domino's Pizza.

== Gameplay ==
The game is heavily based around fifth-generation console platformers, such as Super Mario 64 and Tomb Raider. The game also utilizes movement options like wall running, wall jumping, and swinging and grappling with a Yo-yo item, and introduces gravity effects resembling Super Mario Galaxy's planetoids, and puzzle platforming sections. If using a controller, the player can perform a pressure-sensitive dab move.

== Plot ==
The game's opening uses a live action FMV cutscene to show Domino's Pizza mascot, The Noid, getting his Yo-yo stolen. As The Noid goes on a quest to retrieve it, he finds himself in the Noid Void, a cosmic realm full of sentient pizza toppings and ingredients. The Noid learns that the Heavenly Spire, a leaning tower of pizza, has been stolen. With the denizens of the Noid Void living in a world without pizza, The Noid takes it upon himself to find the stolen pizzas and bring them back to the Noid Void.

Upon reconstructing the Heavenly Spire, The Noid climbs to the top to discover a dark room, with chains and television screens of a shadowed figure illuminating the space. The shadowed figure reveals himself to be 'Mike Hatsune', a blue-haired corporate official, who stole The Noid's Yo-yo and the pizzas that composed the Heavenly Spire. Mike tells The Noid that he is no longer a worthy mascot, and has been replaced with a new icon who can be a voice for people and pizza alike, calling the new mascot a "Vocal-Noid". Once the new mascot is released, Mike Hatsune threatens to erase the Noid Void for good. The Noid defeats Mike in combat, and Mike tells him that his fate is already set in motion, as the first domino has fallen, and his replacement is out for delivery. The room becomes overrun with visual glitches and cuts to black, as a digital voice says "Domino’s Pizza".

== Development ==
Yo! Noid 2: Enter the Void was completed in one month, from June 30, 2017, to August 1, 2017. The name used on platform itch.io comes from Episode 58 of the Waypoint Radio Podcast, titled "Yo! Noid Was Ahead of Its Time", following one of the game jam's rules that the title had to come from a Waypoint Radio title.

The visual style of the Noid Void was inspired by the backgrounds of Will Vinton's Noid advertisements.

The game's plot, including its antagonist Mike Hatsune, is based on vocaloid Hatsune Miku, and uses elements of the 2013 Domino's App feat. Hatsune Miku, a Japan-only food delivery app that gained notoriety in the west after its commercial, featuring president and CEO of Domino's Pizza Japan, Scott Oelkers, went viral. The idea of a vocaloid replacing The Noid as a mascot comes from the discontinuation of Domino's Noid mascot in America.

== Reception and legacy ==
The game had overall positive reception, with critics noting its surreal, but lighthearted tone, but occasional brutal difficulty.

The game was featured in Summer Games Done Quick 2018, as speedrunner AlucardX60 completed the game in 13:15.

The game was featured on the WWAYTV3 news channel, as a review on the Gaming Trends segment, with critic David Lewis noting its surreal nature and work of love from fans.

Two of the game's developers, Harrison Bright and Quade Zaban, are developing a new original game with similar mechanics, titled The Big Catch, set for release in 2026.
