= Asia Emergency Response Facility =

Special Operation of the UN World Food Programme

Asia Emergency Response Facility (AERF) is a Special Operation of the United Nations World Food Programme, designed to establish an emergency response facility in Asia.

The AERF was created in 2003 following the signing of an MOU between the World Food Programme and the Cambodian Government. The purpose of AERF would become the Asia facility of the United Nations Humanitarian Response Depot (UNHRD), working in collaboration with the other operating UNHRD facilities to provide worldwide coverage for "first line response" to emergencies.

AERF was created to meet the requirements for planning and supplying equipment for emergencies in Asia. Although the facility is primarily for WFP use, it is designed to be shared by UN agencies, the Red Cross movement, international and local NGOs and partners from the private sector.

== See also ==
- Emergency management
