= Urban Jungle =

Freeware educational driving game

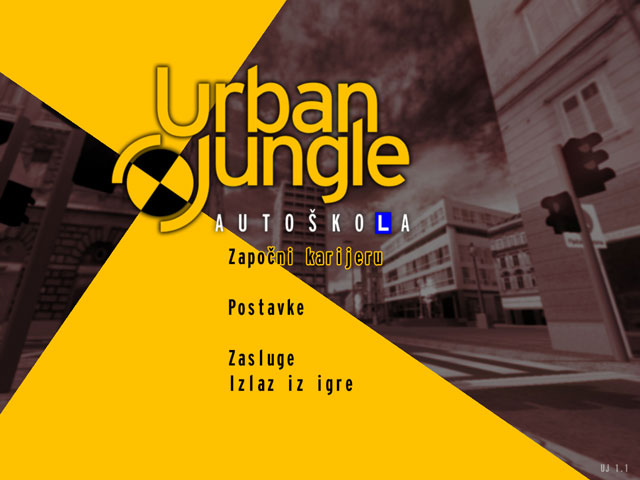
- Urban Jungle main menu
- Developer(s): Urban Development
- Publisher(s): Autoklub Rijeka; Talented Programmers Association of Rijeka (DIR)
- Platform(s): Microsoft Windows
- Release: WW: 6 December 2005
- Genre(s): Educational driving game
- Mode(s): Single-player

Urban Jungle is a freeware educational driving game. The game features a virtual version of the city centre of the Croatian city of Rijeka. The player drives a car through the city, performing missions for money while taking care not to break traffic rules; a later update also added a driving school simulation.

Urban Jungle is the first educational driving game made in Croatia. The development started in June 2002; a total of 40 people worked on the project, which was financed through grants and in-game advertising. The game was previewed in November 2005 and published by Autoklub Rijeka and Talented Programmers Association of Rijeka (DIR) the following month. The game saw use as a tool to promote safe driving by the Croatian authorities. In 2013, a sequel was announced, but it was reported to be still in development by the end of 2016.

== Gameplay ==
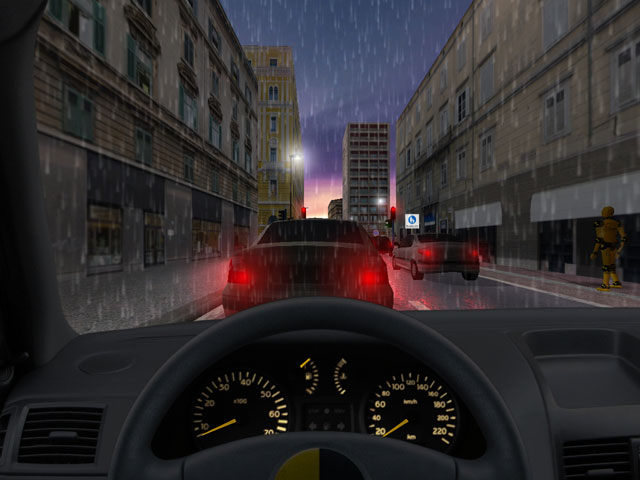
Gameplay screenshot. The player is driving through Rijeka city centre.

The player drives a car through Rijeka, performing time-limited missions. The game has an "infinite" number of tasks and the goal is to drive as long as possible without committing a violation. After each completed mission, they are rewarded with money and penalised for breaking traffic laws. If enough in-game money is accrued, it is possible to buy better cars. Money can also be spent on fuel, repairs of damage resulting from crashes, and traffic infractions. The player must be careful not to hit pedestrians, which are, in order to avoid graphic violence, represented by crash test dummies. If the player accumulates too much damage on their car or too many penalty points, or hits a police officer, the game ends.

A driver's education mode was added to the game in a 2007 update, entitled Urban Jungle: Autoškola v1.1 (autoškola means "driving school" in Croatian). The player has to complete driving exams at a test track before being allowed to undertake driving missions. The update also featured more detailed graphics, a renewed car pool and more complicated missions. The developers also added weather, the ability to go sightseeing in-game as a pedestrian, the ability to receive insurance reimbursement for damage caused by non-player cars, and the ability to purchase a new vehicle through a bank loan.

== Development ==
The development of Urban Jungle started in June 2002. The game was financed through in-game advertising by local and foreign companies and nonprofit organisations such as UNICEF. It also received funds from the government of the City of Rijeka. Around 40 people worked on the project. The game programmers built their own 3D engine, Urban3D. Parts of the game, including 3D models and some of the textures, were designed on Mac computers. There were plans to port the game to Mac OS X, which were abandoned with Apple's transition to x86 architecture.

== Release and legacy ==
The game was previewed at the International Fair of New Technologies on 24 November 2005, and again in 2007. It was released on 6 December 2005, and made available for free download online, and distributed in computer magazines. It was published by Autoklub Rijeka and Talented Programmers Association of Rijeka (DIR, Udruga darovitih informatičara Rijeke). The game was hailed as the first Croatian driving simulation game where players had to abide by traffic rules.

In 2006 Autoklub Rijeka held a competition in playing Urban Jungle for high school students, awarding the winner with free driving lessons. In 2016, Rijeka police used the game to promote road transport safety.

It is popular not only on the Croatian market but also in the neighboring countries Bosnia and Herzegovina and Serbia.

== Sequel ==
In 2013, a sequel was announced, entitled Urban Jungle 2. It is to be distributed on both Windows and Mac and possibly feature a virtual version of Zagreb, the capital of Croatia. Urban Jungle's original engine, Urban3D, was to be replaced by Unity in the next installment. Urban Jungle 2 would also be a massively multiplayer online game. As of November 2016, Urban Jungle 2 was still in development.
