= Advergame =

Practice where video games are used for promotion

An advergame (portmanteau of "advertisement" and "video game") is a form of advertising in video games, in which the video game is developed by or in close collaboration with a corporate entity for purposes of advertising a brand-name product. While other video games may use in-game advertising (such as an advertisement on a virtual billboard or branding on an in-game object), an advergame is differentiated by the Interactive Advertising Bureau as a "game specifically designed around [the] product or service being advertised". An advergame is considered a type of advertainment.

Advergames are utilized to capture the consumer's attention more effectively than regular advertisements because of the medium and its interactivity. If the player is positive towards the game, they will likely have positive feelings for the product advertised as well. Advergames are commonly targeted to minors, who tend to be more responsive to persuasive messages that can be embedded in such games. Concerns have been raised by parents and advocates for children that such advergames can influence children's habits, particularly food-based products.

== History ==
Advergames appeared early in the history of the video game industry. One of the first known attempts was a polo sport game tied into the clothing brand Polo, which Carol Shaw had been developing for the Atari 2600 around 1978, but which had been cancelled prior to release. The first known released advergame was Tapper, a 1984 arcade game. The game had been originally sponsored by brewer Anheuser-Busch, and prominently featured the brand's logo. Gameplay was based around serving beer. Its release was targeted for bars or other establishments for adults, but the game proved popular, and an all-ages, non-branded version, Root Beer Tapper, was released for general arcades and later ported to home systems.

Numerous advergames were developed through the 1980s and 1990s for home video game consoles and personal computers, but with the introduction of wide-spread availability of the Internet, browser games became a popular route for advergames. Such games were cheaper to produce compared to previous advergames as well as to other traditional advertising routes such as television advertising. A Kaiser Family Foundation report in 2006 found that 73% of 96 food product companies had established dedicated sections of their websites with advergames that were targeted at children, with many of these offering multiple advergames.

The term "advergames" was coined by Anthony Giallourakis in 1999. The Internet domain www.advergames.com was purchased that year by Giallourakis and several years later (in 2008), a free web portal showcasing a selection of the browser based advergames was launched.

Advergames moved into mobile games by around 2014, due to the proliferation of mobile devices and their common use by children.

Roblox, an online game platform and creation system, has been commonly used for advergames for its popularity among younger players and allowance for easy development. The Swedish game studio The Gang was founded to create advergames on Roblox for brands. Companies have used Roblox for new marketing methods within advergames, such as Walmart, which has sold real products through the platform, and IKEA, which has hired employees for paid work in its virtual store The Co-Worker Game.

=== Other examples ===
Other examples of advergames that have achieved widespread awareness include:

- Yo! Noid, a 1990 platformer released for the Nintendo Entertainment System to advertise Domino's Pizza. Its cult fanbase eventually led to a fanmade 2017 sequel called Yo! Noid 2: Enter the Void, which eventually got a deluxe edition called "Yo! Noid 2: Game Of A Year Edition"
- Chex Quest, a non-violent first-person shooter developed for personal computers in 1996 for the Chex cereal brand. A total conversion of Doom, it is considered one of the few advergames that was enjoyable to play.
- Pepsiman released for the PlayStation in 1999, was developed by KID only for release in Japan. It focused the player on avoiding obstacles to save dehydrated people by bringing them a can of Pepsi.
- America's Army, released for personal computers in 2002, was developed by the United States Army as a recruiting tool for teenage players.
- Sneak King, PocketBike Racer, and Big Bumpin', available at Burger King restaurants in the United States and Canada in 2006. The most successful, Sneak King, sold more than 2 million copies that year.
- Citroën C4 Robot, released in 2008, promoted the Citroën C4 and was published by Citroën exclusively for Turkey.

== Legal concerns ==
=== Protection for children ===
Because video games generally draw significant interest from children, there are ethical and legal concerns around advergames. Whereas adults generally can recognize and resist persuasive advertising in games, younger children may not recognize that an advergame is a form of advertising and can be drawn in by statements made by the game, especially in a more complex advergame where the advertising is more incorporated or subtle.

One key market area of concern was food product-based advergames. The increased use of browser and mobile advergames in the mid-2000s led to concerns that such games would lead to an increase in the childhood obesity rate. In particular, many food-based advergames promote less nutritious products like snack foods. However, research has shown that the influence of advergames is not limited to foods with poor nutrition, as a study using advergames designed around healthy food choices led to the monitored children to select a healthier snack when presented a variety of choices.

=== False advertising ===
Advergames can run afoul of laws established related to truth in advertising. Making false claims, even if in language not intended to be advertising, in advergames can result in penalties and fines by the national or regional consumer protection agencies. In a notable case, the Gatorade company, a subsidiary of PepsiCo, had published a free mobile game Bolt! which featured Usain Bolt and challenged the player to "keep your performance high by avoiding water". The state of California asserted this claim was false, as Gatorade had been shown to be more harmful to the human body than water, and with the game targeted to youth, send the wrong message. The state sued Gatorade, and the case was ultimately settled with Gatorade paying a US$300,000 fine to the state, part of which the state used to promote health-conscious water-drinking habits for children.

=== National regulations and oversight ===
In the United States, attempts have been made by the United States Congress to give the Federal Trade Commission (FTC) authority to oversee online advertising aimed at children, including advergames, but had been challenged by lobbies representing the food industry and effectively shut down such attempts. Nevertheless, the propagation of online games and advertising aimed at children led to passage of the Children's Online Privacy Protection Act (COPPA) in 2000, which set strict standards for what type of private information websites could collect from minors, with the FTC overseeing any such fines.

In the United Kingdom, advergames regulation was brought into coverage by the CAP Code or the Code of Non-broadcast Advertising, Sales Promotion and Direct Marketing in 2016. The CAP code, updated frequently, provides specific guidance on what advergames (among other types of advertising) can and cannot do, with specific attention to how such games may influence children. CAP code violations are monitored and penalized by the Advertising Standards Authority.

== Other concerns ==
Messaging in advergames may backfire and impact the reputation of the brand the game promotes. A notable example from Intel, which had published in 2004 The Intel IT Manager Game, a browser-based game that attempted to give insight into the job opportunities of an information technology manager, including simulating the hires of new employees. However, the game only allowed male employees to be hired by design, and Intel received criticism for discounting female hires. The game was taken offline and later replaced with a new version that had equal gender representation. While the situation could be compared to a similar problem around the game Fable which also forced players to use male avatars, the real-world setting of Intel's game was seen as a more serious flaw, and at the time, gender representation in the information technology industry was a serious concern.
