= Network for Capacity Development in Nutrition =

The Network for Capacity Development in Nutrition is a working group of the United Nations Standing Committee on Nutrition. The committee established a set of working groups on capacity development in close collaboration with United Nations University. Reports are available on the Network's website.

== History ==
The network had an initial meeting in 2005 and five meetings between 2006 and 2010; its results are published in scientific journals. The Standing Committee on Nutrition formed nine working groups, of which the Network for Capacity Development in Nutrition was one. The network's capacity development includes human resource development, organizational, institutional and legal framework development. Capacity development is a long term, continuing process. It gives primacy to national priorities, plans, policies and processes. Participants came from Albania, Bosnia and Herzegovina, Bulgaria, Croatia, Czech Republic, Estonia, Macedonia, Hungary, Poland, Romania, Serbia, Slovakia, Slovenia and facilitators came from the Netherlands and Norway.

== Objective ==
The general objective of the Network for Capacity Development in Nutrition is to initiate and support capacity development activities in research and training in Central and Eastern European countries based on country-specific needs. The objectives will be linked to CEE-specific topics of interest. This is to be open for new challenges following the changes in the various countries over time.

The European System of Cooperative Research Networks in Agriculture was established in 1974 by the UN Food and Agriculture Organization and European research institutions. It became an umbrella for cooperation between research institutions focused on food, agriculture and related fields. Since its foundation, it has expanded to include 19 networks, including Network for Capacity Development in Nutrition CEE. In 2009, with the financial support of Food and Agriculture Organization REU and technical support of the Food and Agriculture Organization, a new server was set up in Rome to serve as common technical background for the AgroWeb Network, the European System of Cooperative Research Networks in Agriculture, and the Thematic Knowledge Networks.

== Affiliation ==
The network links to multiple European Economic Community projects:

- EURRECA – European Micronutrient Recommendation Aligned
- European Food Information Resource Network Nexus - European Food Information Resource Network
- DIETS - Dietitians Improving Education Training Standards across Europe, the thematic network for dietitians in Europe

== Publications ==
- Pavlovic, Mirjana; Witthöft, Cornelia M.; Hollman, Peter; Hulshof, Paul J.M.; Glibetic, Maria; Porubska, Janka; Pepping, Fré; Oshaug, Arne (April 2009). "Training and capacity building in central and eastern Europe through the EuroFIR and CEE networks". Food Chemistry. 113 (3): 846–850. doi:10.1016/j.foodchem.2008.03.069. ISSN 0308-8146.
- Pavlovic, Mirjana; Pepping, Fré; Demes, Michal; Biro, Lajos; Szabolcs, Peter; Dimitrovska, Zlatka; Duleva, Vesselka; Parvan, Camelia; Hadziomeragic, Aida Filipovic (August 2009). "Turning dilemmas into opportunities: a UNU/SCN capacity development network in public nutrition in Central and Eastern Europe". Public Health Nutrition. 12 (8): 1046–1051. doi:10.1017/S1368980008004692. ISSN 1475-2727. PMID 19195424.
- Gurinović, M; Witthöft, C M; Tepšić, J; Ranić, M; Hulshof, P J M; Hollman, P C; Porubska, J; Gohar, A; Debeljak-Martačić, J (November 2010). "Capacity development in food composition database management and nutritional research and education in Central and Eastern European, Middle Eastern and North African countries". European Journal of Clinical Nutrition. 64 (S3): S134 – S138. doi:10.1038/ejcn.2010.224. ISSN 0954-3007. PMID 21045842.
