= The Noid =

Advertising character for Domino's Pizza

- The Noid in a 1986 advertisement for Domino's Pizza
- First appearance: 1986; 40 years ago
- Created by: Group 243, Will Vinton Studios
- Voiced by: Pons Maar (1986–1995) Guillermo Badolato (Crash Bandicoot: On the Run!)

In-universe information
- Gender: Male
- Occupation: Pizza Destroyer

The Noid is an advertising character for Domino's Pizza created in the 1980s by claymation artist Will Vinton, which has since been briefly revived several times. A mischievous man in a rabbit-like mask and a skin-tight red bodysuit, he was portrayed as a perpetrator of many bizarre schemes designed to ruin the world's pizzas. Supposedly, only Domino's managed to, as the commercial's tagline went, "avoid the Noid".

A hostage situation occurred when, on January 30, 1989, a mentally unstable man named Kenneth Lamar Noid, believing the character was created to mock him, held a Domino's employee at gunpoint, demanding money, a getaway car, and a book. He was eventually arrested and spent three months in a mental health facility, but the character remained in use until 1995, when Kenneth Noid killed himself. The Noid has appeared in media only very sporadically since.

== History ==
The Noid was created in 1986 by an advertising agency called Group 243, which hired Will Vinton Studios to sketch the Noid and animate the advertisements using claymation. His vocal effects were provided by Pons Maar. Most of the advertisements were narrated by Andre Stojka.

In 1988, a Saturday morning cartoon series called The Noids was planned by CBS, but was canceled amid complaints that it was merely an advertising ploy and not a show for children.

As part of the advertising campaign, a computer game was released in 1989 called Avoid the Noid. The object of the game is to deliver a pizza within a half-hour time limit in an apartment building swarming with Noids (some of which are armed with pizza-seeking missiles or water balloons). In 1990, Capcom released a platform game, Yo! Noid, for the Nintendo Entertainment System, where the Noid was portrayed as a pizza-consuming hero instead.

== Chamblee hostage incident ==
On January 30, 1989, Kenneth Lamar Noid (1966–1995), a mentally ill man who believed that the "Avoid the Noid" campaign was targeted at him, entered a Domino's restaurant in Chamblee, Georgia. Armed with a .357 Magnum, Noid then held two employees hostage for over five hours.

After ranting to the employees about how Domino's owner Tom Monaghan had stolen his name, Noid forced them to call the Domino's headquarters to demand $100,000 and a white limousine as a getaway car. He offered to exchange a hostage for a copy of the novel The Widow's Son by Robert Anton Wilson, but reneged on this when an officer brought him the book. Noid then became hungry and forced the captive employees to make him two pizzas. While Noid ate the pizzas with his gun in his lap, the hostages escaped. Noid surrendered to the police shortly after. Two shots were fired by Noid during the incident, both of them hitting the ceiling.

Noid was charged with kidnapping, aggravated assault, extortion, and possession of a firearm during a crime. He was found not guilty by reason of insanity. Noid subsequently spent time in a mental institution, but died by suicide on February 23, 1995. This incident was widely believed to have caused Domino's Pizza to discontinue advertising using the Noid as their mascot, but this claim has been rejected by the company and their advertisers.

== Revivals ==
Domino's made a limited run of 1,000 Noid T-shirts in December 2009. On May 4, 2011, the Noid was used as a promotional figure for the Facebook page of Domino's, and made a brief appearance as a stuffed toy at the end of a May 2011 advertisement promoting a one-topping pizza deal. The 25th birthday of the Noid was marked with the video game The Noid's Super Pizza Shootout, a tribute to Avoid the Noid.

In June 2016, Spooky Pinball announced the release of its new licensed pinball machine, Domino's Spectacular Pinball Adventure prominently featuring the Noid character. During 2016, the Noid appeared and was referenced in some Domino's commercials, as part of their USA "Pizza Payback" campaign.

The Noid is briefly in the background of a 2017 Domino's advertisement.

The Noid returned to television in April 2021 in a series of brief video advertisements on social media. Domino's officially confirmed the return of the Noid later in the month, and he was subsequently included in the mobile game Crash Bandicoot: On the Run! as part of a tie-in promotion.

== Cultural impact ==
In August 2017, a fan-made sequel to Yo! Noid was created for the New Jam City 2017 game jam called Yo! Noid 2: Enter the Void.

In 2023, the video game Pizza Tower released, featuring a boss (and later, playable) character named "The Noise," whose appearance and behavior are based on the Noid. Designer McPig originally created the Noise as a villain suitable for a pizza-based game.
