= Journal of Interactive Advertising =

The Journal of Interactive Advertising (JIA) is a peer-reviewed international journal covering the field of interactive advertising, marketing and communication in the internet. It publishes original research related to advertising using interactive means, including both online and offline, to promote mutual actions among consumers, messages and brands. It covers any aspects of interactive advertising: the roles of interactivity on advertising effectiveness, interactive advertising in global and multi-cultural settings, data analytics and methodological issues, along with more macro aspects such as economic and social impacts of interactive advertising. It is published by Routledge on behalf of the American Academy of Advertising.

== History ==
The journal was established in Fall 2000 by John D. Leckenby (University of Texas at Austin) and Hairong Li (Michigan State University), who served as founding editors-in-chief. It was an official publication of the Department of Advertising, Public Relations, and Retailing at Michigan State University and the Department of Advertising at The University of Texas at Austin until December 31, 2007. The American Academy of Advertising became its publisher on January 1, 2008. It is currently published (since 2013) by Routledge on behalf of the American Academy of Advertising.

== Editors-in-chief ==
The following persons have been editor-in-chief:

- John D. Leckenby (2000-2007)
- Hairong Li (2000-2011)
- Steve Edwards (2012-2014)
- Terry Daugherty (2015-2018)
- Jooyoung Kim (2019-current)

== Abstracting and indexing ==
The journal is abstracted and indexed in Scopus and EBSCOhost.
