= European System of Cooperative Research Networks in Agriculture =

The European System of Cooperative Research Networks in Agriculture (ESCORENA) is a web-based networking and knowledge sharing platform for people around the world. ESCORENA Network is a European initiative which asserts the use of information and communication technology to further the goals of agriculture and food security as well as safety. ESCORENA acts as a neutral platform where members from various parts of the world can participate.

ESCORENA was established in 1974 by the Food and Agriculture Organization of the United Nations and European research institutions.

ESCORENA consists of nineteen (19) thematic Networks namely Apricot Network, Buffalo Network, CENTAUR Biomedical Technology, Epidemiology and Food Safety Network, Cotton Network, Farm Animal Welfare (FAW) Network, Flax and other Bast Plants Network, Museum Network, Network of Aquaculture Centres in Central and Eastern Europe (NACEE), Network on Capacity Development in Nutrition (NCDN), Network on Nuts, Olives Network, Organic Edunet, Pastures Network, Rice Network, Sheep & Goats Network, Sunflower Network, Agromarketing Network, Rye Network, in addition to the inter-disciplinary networks namely Sustainable Rural Energy Network (SREN) and Recycling of Agricultural, Municipal and Industrial Residues in Agriculture Network (RAMIRAN). ESCORENA Networks conduct regular technical meetings, workshops and trainings for its members and participants. ESCORENA regularly publishes research results, proceedings and special studies in scientific journals and bulletins. The most recent Scientific Bulletin of ESCORENA has been published by Aurel Vlaicu, University of Arad, Romania.
