= Coca-Cola Kid (video game) =

1994 video game

- Box art
- Developer: Aspect Co.
- Publisher: Sega
- Director: Katsuhiro Hasegawa
- Producer: Motoshige Hokoyama
- Designers: Sharusharu; M. Shimamura; Ray
- Programmer: Kazuyuki Oikawa
- Artists: Hisato Fukumoto; Gen Adachi
- Composer: Kojiro Mikusa
- Platform: Game Gear
- Release: JP: August 5, 1994
- Genre: Platform
- Mode: Single-player

Coca-Cola Kid (Note: Japanese: コーラキッド, Hepburn: Koka Kōra Kiddo), also known as The Dashing Young Boy: The Coca-Cola Kid (Note: Japanese: 颯爽少年英雄伝コカ・コーラキッド, Hepburn: Sassō Shōnen Eiyū-den Koka Kōra Kiddo), is a Japan-exclusive platform game released in 1994 for the Game Gear. The game stars Cokey (コーキー, Kōkī), a mascot character who appeared in Coca-Cola's Japanese commercials of the 1990s.

== Plot ==
Coca-Cola Kid takes place in Coke City where a kid named Cokey, who is a student in Skat School, finds himself on a mission to save his teacher after she gets kidnapped.

== Gameplay ==
The game uses timed platform game sequences. Power-ups include the famous Coca-Cola soft drink that helps restore health and the coins that helps the player buy items between stages.

Each stage has a 9:59 time limit. Attacks in the games include kicks and flying kicks. Obstacles, like the telephone booths in the downtown level, can also be torn down.

== Development ==
The game was reportedly done as part of a licensing agreement between Coca-Cola and Sega. The inclusion of Cokey served as one of the few examples of integrating advertising with gaming.

== Marketing ==
Coca-Cola Kid was marketed in Japan with the game included in a special red Game Gear bundle.

== Reception ==
The game got a score of 50 from Famitsu (6/10 5/10 5/10 4/10).

Beep! MegaDrive gave a score of 63.

Sega Saturn Magazine gave a score of 65 (6.468/10).
