= United Nations Humanitarian Air Service =

Air Transport programme for the United Nations

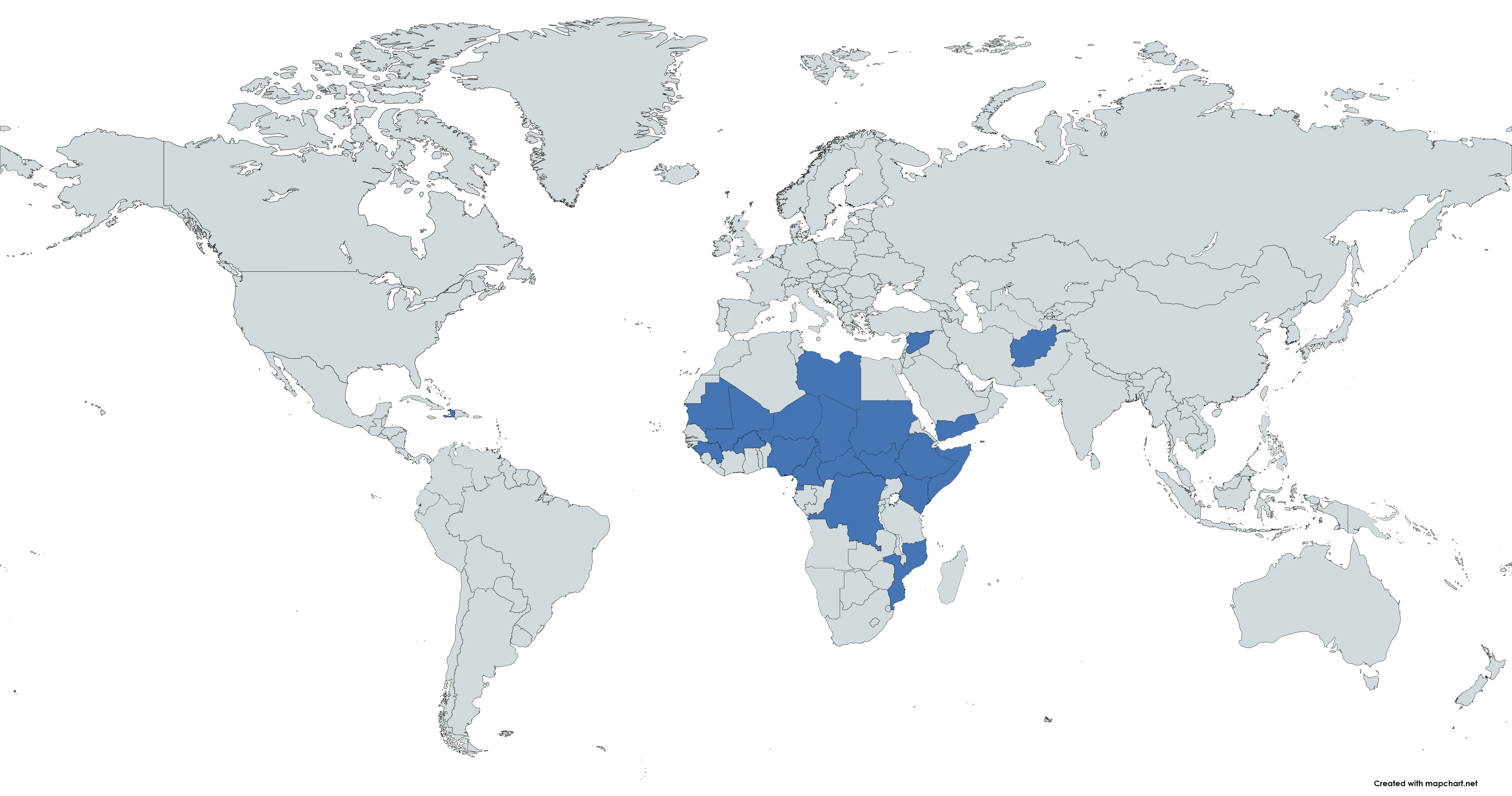
- A map showing active UNHAS Operations of 2021
IATA	ICAO	Call sign
-	UNO	UNITED NATIONS
- Founded: 2003
- Fleet size: 75
- Destinations: 310
- Parent company: (World Food Programme); United Nations
- Website: www.wfp.org/unhas

The United Nations Humanitarian Air Service (UNHAS), was created in 2003 at the request of the United Nations High-Level Committee on Management, managed by the World Food Programme (WFP), provides common air services, including light cargo transport for the wider humanitarian community to and from areas of crisis and intervention. In most countries requiring humanitarian assistance, surface travel is impeded by challenging security situations, long distances and poor road conditions. Furthermore, most of the destinations the humanitarian community needs to reach are not served by adequate commercial air operators. When no other means of reaching isolated communities are available, aid workers can rely on UNHAS to provide access.

To fulfill its mission, UNHAS uses a fleet of 75 aircraft and helicopters chartered from commercial air operators that are compliant with the International Civil Aviation Organization (ICAO) Standards and Recommended Practices (SARP) and the United Nations Aviation Standards for Peacekeeping and Humanitarian Air Transport Operations (UNAVSTADS).

Chartered aircraft are fully dedicated to UNHAS operations. Therefore, contracted air carriers are assured of revenue in terms of guaranteed aircraft utilization for the duration of the contract. This, along with UNHAS' efficient management of schedules, ensures that partner air carriers avoid taking undue risks to achieve financial gains. For example, in the event of a flight cancellation due to poor weather conditions, the air carrier would not be financially penalized.

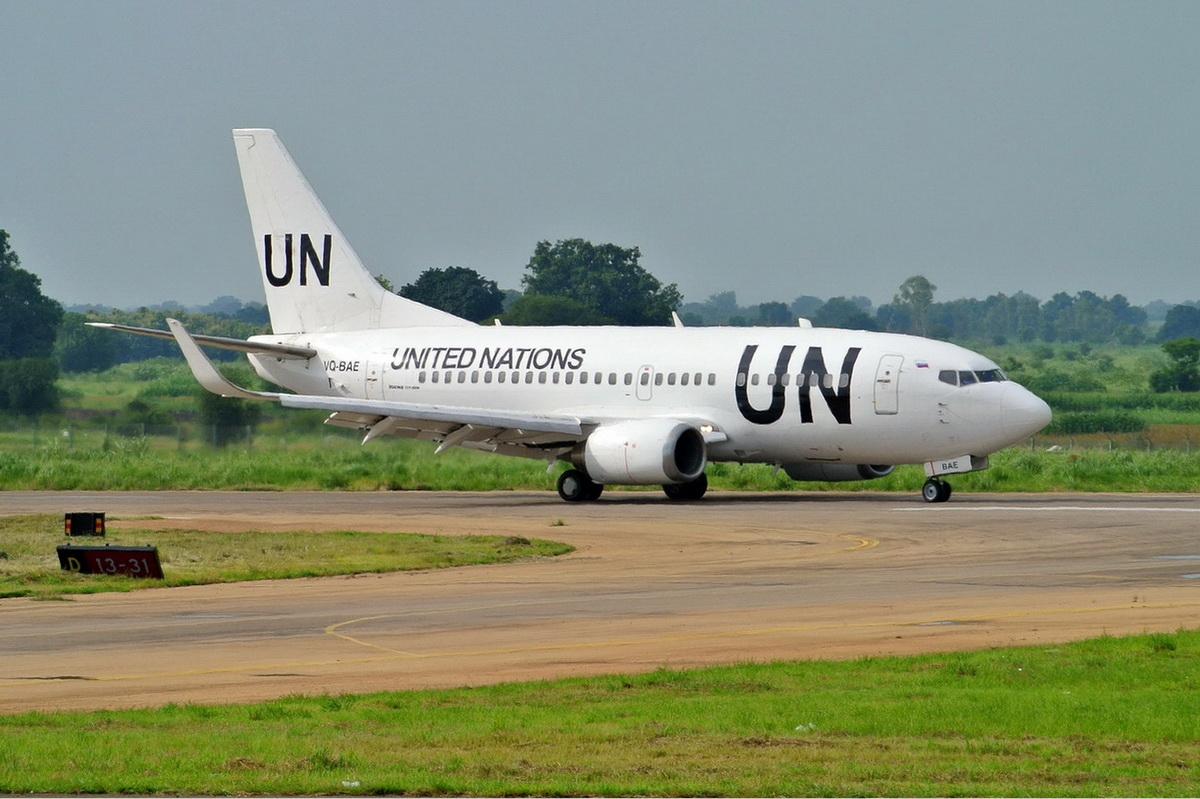
Boeing 737-500 operated by UTair, 2012

== UNHAS operations ==
In 2021 UNHAS provided passenger and light cargo services in 23 countries

- Afghanistan
- Burkina Faso
- Cameroon
- Central African Republic
- Chad
- Democratic Republic of the Congo
- Equatorial Guinea
- Ethiopia
- Guinea
- Haiti
- Kenya
- Libya
- Madagascar
- Mali
- Mauritania
- Mozambique
- Niger
- Nigeria
- Somalia
- South Sudan
- Sudan
- Syrian Arab Republic
- Yemen

== Fleet ==
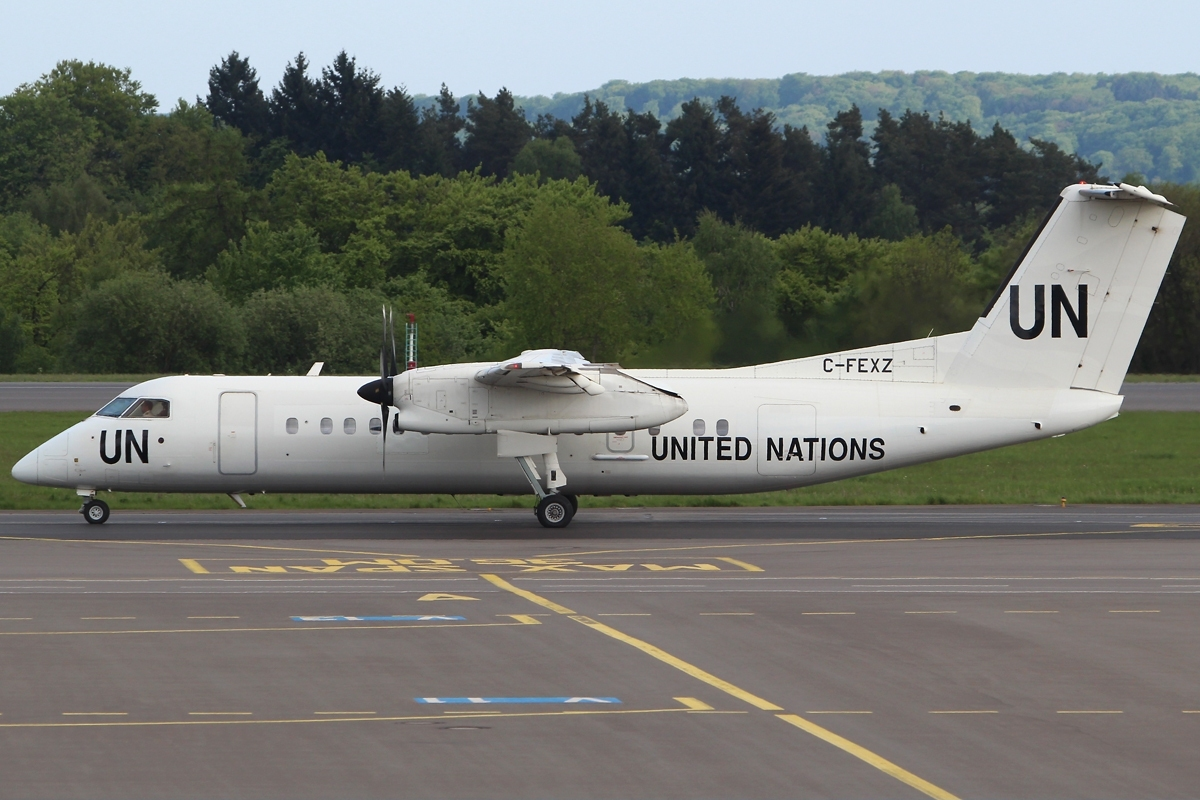
A De Havilland Canada Dash 8-300 operated by Voyageur Airways, 2013

To fulfil its mission, UNHAS uses a fleet of 75 aircraft, of which 59 are fixed-wing aircraft and 16 are rotary-wing aircraft.

Aircraft	Area of Operation	Variant	Notes
Fixed-wing aircraft
Airbus A320-200	Yemen	A320-211	
Beechcraft 1900	Afghanistan, Chad, DRC, Equatorial Guinea, Guinea, Mali, Mauritania, Somalia, Sudan	1900D	
Bombardier CRJ	DRC, Syria	CRJ100/200	
Cessna 208 Caravan	Cameroon, CAR, Chad, DRC, Ethiopia, Madagascar, Somalia, Sudan		
De Havilland Canada 6	Haiti		
De Havilland Canada Dash 8	Afghanistan, CAR, DRC,Ethiopia, Kenya, Niger, Somalia, South Sudan, Yemen	100/200/400	
Dornier 228	CAR, DRC, Mali, South Sudan		
Dornier 328	Nigeria		
Embraer 145	Afghanistan, Cameroon, Chad, Libya, Niger, Sudan, Yemen	ERJ135/ERJ145	
Fokker 50	Somalia		
Ilyushin IL-76	South Sudan		
Let L-410	CAR, Mozambique, South Sudan		
Rotary-wing aircraft
Airbus EC225	Nigeria		Used in Northeast Nigeria for security and medical transport
Bell 412	Nigeria		
Mi-8	Afghanistan, Burkina Faso, CAR, DRC, Haiti, South Sudan,Yemen	MI-8T; MI-8MTV/AMT	

== Performance ==
In 2021, UNHAS transported 325,112 passengers alongside 5,862 mt of humanitarian cargo and food to 496 destinations (including ad hoc) in 23 countries. Additionally, 3,015 evacuations were carried out during this year, including security relocations, and medical evacuations (including those of COVID-19).

== Funding ==
WFP/UNHAS is funded by contributions from donors and money realized from a partial cost recovery scheme through which passengers pay ticket fees for the air service.

The UNHAS donors in 2021 were: Canada, Czech Republic, Denmark, the European Union, France, Germany, Ireland, Italy, Japan, South Korea, Luxembourg, Monaco, Norway, Qatar, Romania, Spain, Sweden, Switzerland, the United Kingdom, UNICEF, the United States, the United Nations itself and Private Donors.
