= Companion ad =

Display ad shown alongside a video or audio ad

In online advertising, a companion ad is a display ad shown alongside a video or audio ad, usually displayed on top of the player and/or on its side. It is displayed at the same time as the master ad and offers the user a spot to click. It can continue to be displayed after the master ad has finished playing. They are called companion ads because they are thought of as a companion to the main video or audio ad

Companion ads are seen as giving an advantage to brands because customers will have access to the brand after the video ad ends in the event they gain interest

Services like YouTube (video ad) or Spotify (audio ad) allow advertisers to add companion ads to their master ads.

For video ads, as standardized by the Interactive Advertising Bureau, the companion ad is defined alongside its master ad inside the VAST response. It is characterized by the creative's resolution and type, the file URL and a click-through URL.

Companion ads are also used on connected TVs as a new way for brands and advertisers to engage deeper with the TV viewers. In that context, the companion ad is clicked with the remote controller instead of the mouse (PC) or finger (mobile). Services like Roku also support inserting companion ads on TVs through set-top boxes.
