= Food Force =

2005 video game

- Publisher: United Nations World Food Programme
- Platforms: Windows, Mac
- Release: 2005
- Genres: Educational, serious
- Mode: Single-player

Food Force is an educational video game published by the United Nations World Food Programme (WFP) in 2005. It is a serious game (game with educational purpose). Players take on missions to distribute food in a famine-affected country and to help it to recover and become self-sufficient again. At the same time they learn about hunger in the real world and the WFP's work to prevent it.

== Gameplay ==
The game takes place on the fictional island of Sheylan in the Indian Ocean, which is suffering from both drought and civil war. The player's character is a rookie who has joined a team of UN experts, including a nutritionist, a logistics officer, a pilot, an appeals officer, and the director of food purchasing.

The game contains six missions:

1. Air surveillance: Locating hungry citizens in a helicopter
2. Energy pacs: Produce a balanced diet of rice, cooking oil, beans, sugar and salt within a budget of only 30 cents per day
3. Food drop: drop food supplies in a target zone, while compensating for wind direction
4. Locate and dispatch: co-ordinate supplies of purchased and donated food from around the world
5. Food run: Lead a food convoy to a depot, dealing with hazards like landmines and roadblocks
6. Future farming: Use food aid to help a village develop over 10 years, by investing in it carefully with nutrition training, schooling, "food for work" and HIV/AIDS treatment

Most of the gameplay is arcade oriented, with time-limited sequences. All six missions could be played through in under an hour, though players might replay the individual missions, as their high scores could be uploaded online for worldwide comparison with other players, until another game, under the same name, was made by the WFP and Konami.

== Release ==
The game was freely downloadable, but with the release of a game under the same name by WFP, the game's website has been shut down along with all of the official download links. The game is still mirrored on various websites, but there is no official download link. It had versions for the Windows and Macintosh. Linux users could use Wine to install the Windows version of the game and the QuickTime bundled with the package. The Macintosh version of the game is PowerPC only and as such, the game could only be run on PowerPC Macs with Mac OS X Jaguar or higher or on Intel powered Macs running Mac OS X Tiger to Mac OS X Snow Leopard. Users are encouraged to burn the game onto CDs and distribute it to friends. Developed by the British studio Playerthree and the Italian company Deepend, the program uses Macromedia for gameplay and QuickTime for video.

The Food Force website also had lesson plans for teachers, reports on recent WFP work, a high score table and other features.

== Legacy ==
Food Force 2
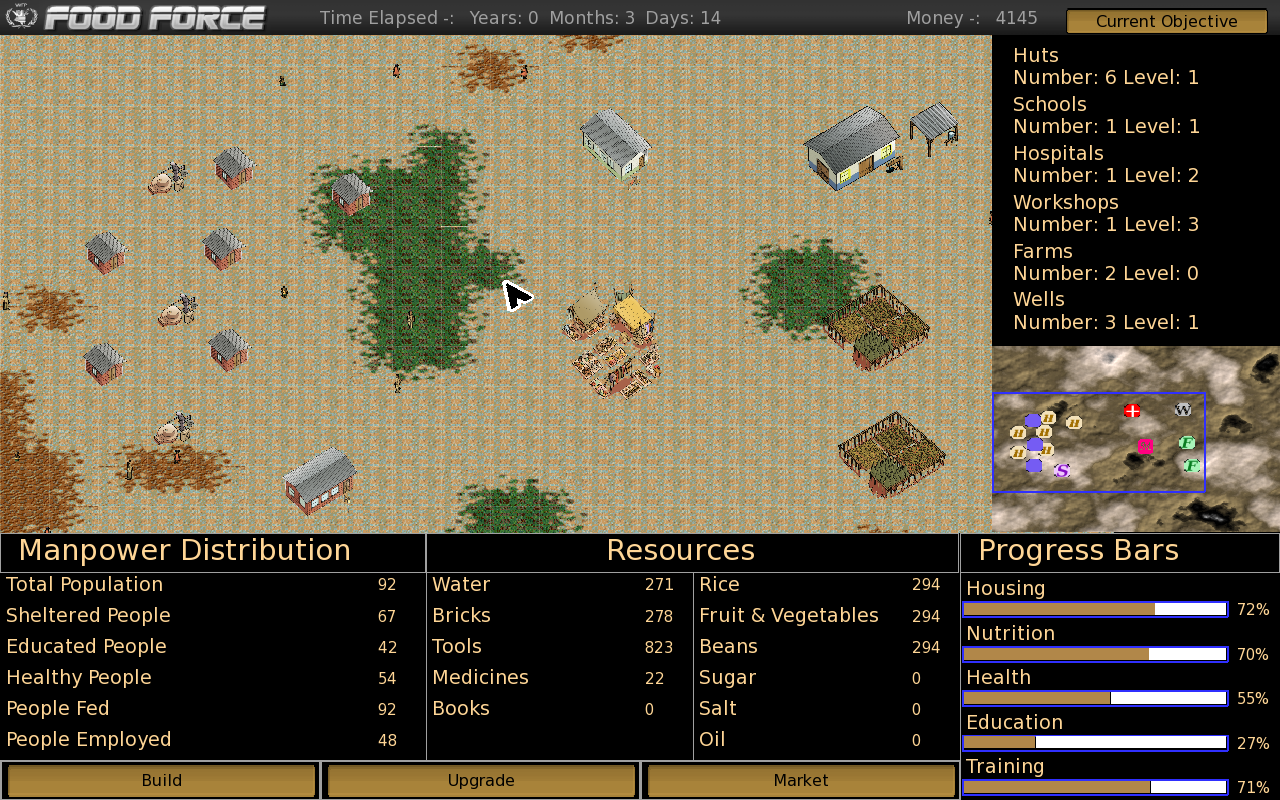
- Publisher: United Nations World Food Programme
- Platforms: Windows, Mac, Linux
- Release: 2009
- Genres: Strategy game, educational game, serious game
- Mode: Single-player

Food Force 2, based on Food Force, has been developed as free software under the terms of version 3 of the GNU General Public License. It is cross-platform as it is written in the Python programming language, and runs on platforms including the One Laptop Per Child XO and the Sugar desktop environment. Food Force 2 is available for download for Linux, Windows and Mac OS X.
