= Yo! Noid =

1990 video game

- North American box art
- Developer: Now Production
- Publisher: Capcom
- Platforms: Nintendo Entertainment System, arcade
- Release: NES: JP: March 16, 1990; NA: November 1990; Arcade: NA: 1991
- Genre: Platform
- Mode: Single-player
- Arcade system: PlayChoice-10

Yo! Noid, known in Japan as Kamen no Ninja Hanamaru, (Note: Japanese: 仮面の忍者 花丸, Hepburn: Kamen No Ninja Hanamaru; lit. "Masked Ninja Hanamaru") is a platform video game developed by Now Production and published by Capcom for the Nintendo Entertainment System. The game was first released in Japan on March 16, 1990, and was localized in the United States to promote the Noid, the mascot of Domino's Pizza. The game was released for Nintendo's NES-based PlayChoice-10 arcade system and was featured in the Japanese TV show GameCenter CX.

== Plot ==
The game opens on a news bulletin claiming that Mr. Green, a green doppelgänger of The Noid, is leading a group of wild creatures to run amok around New York City and cause mass hysteria. The mayor calls upon The Noid to stop this chaos for a massive pizza reward. The Noid embarks with his super yo-yo and various other inventions.

== Gameplay ==
Yo! Noid gameplay

Both games use a modified engine of Wagyan Land and share the same gameplay. The protagonist (Hanamaru or Noid) has no life meter, and loses a life by either making contact with an enemy or running out of time before completing a level. For offense, both characters use different weapons (a Hawk for Hanamaru and a yo-yo for Noid) but can gather magic points by collecting scrolls and use them for screen-clearing special attacks or very rare power-ups, both kinds of which are found in large scrolls opened with their weapons. Extra lives are awarded for every 20,000 points scored. Most levels are traveled on foot, but exceptions include a skateboard and an autogyro (Hanamaru uses his hawk companion for flight). Minigames vary for each version. In Hanamaru, for example, the player whacks penguins in one stage and Yo! Noid uses a "Pizza Crusher" level, as on the "Avoid the Noid" advertisements. Boss battles in Hanamaru utilize a card-based system and Yo! Noid focuses on pizza-eating contests.

== Development ==
Japanese cover art of Kamen no Ninja Hanamaru

Kamen no Ninja Hanamaru was based on the Wagyan Land engine. During American localization, Capcom teamed up with Domino's Pizza to promote the Noid by changing a lot of graphics, sound, and presentation. However, none of the game mechanics were changed. The localized game was released in the rest of the world as Yo! Noid in November 1990. Most of the music was reused for Yo! Noid, changing a few tunes and creating a few new tracks for a more American atmosphere. Namco published the Wagyan Land series, and Capcom published both Hanamaru and Yo! Noid.

Kamen no Ninja Hanamaru was first released in Japan on March 16, 1990.

== Reception ==
Reception

Review score
Publication	Score
Electronic Gaming Monthly	5/10, 6/10, 7/10, 4/10 (NES)

== Legacy ==
On August 1, 2017, a fan-made sequel titled Yo! Noid 2: Enter the Void was released online as freeware. Originally developed as part of the New Jam City 2017 game jam, it features elements from fifth-generation console platform games. On July 1, 2018, a "Game of a Year Edition" was released.
