= Video advertising =

Advertising delivered through online video

Video advertising is online advertising delivered as video over the internet. It includes ads that run before, during, or after publisher video (pre-roll, mid-roll, and post-roll), video units placed inside display ads, and ads bought on connected TV and streaming services.

Video ads are often repurposed or shortened television commercials. Broadcasters and news publishers with online video, including Sky, ITV, The Telegraph, and The Guardian, carry video advertising on their websites and apps.

== History ==
The Interactive Advertising Bureau (IAB) published its first creative guidelines for online broadband video commercials in November 2005, defining in-stream formats and technical standards for publishers and advertisers. The IAB updated its Digital Video Ad Format Guidelines in 2008 to define linear, non-linear, and companion ad types.

In July 2008, the IAB released the Video Ad Serving Template (VAST), an XML standard for communication between video players and ad servers, so publishers could integrate multiple ad networks through a common interface.

By 2010, video advertising accounted for 12.8% of all videos viewed and 1.2% of all minutes spent watching video online in the United States.

Global digital video advertising spending was about $191 billion in 2024.

== Video ad formats ==
The IAB classifies in-stream video ads as linear, non-linear, or companion types. Linear ads pause the main video to play a commercial. Non-linear ads run at the same time as the content, usually as overlays. Companion ads are display units (banners, text, or page skins) shown next to the player rather than inside it.

In-stream ads differ from in-banner video, where the video unit plays inside a standard display placement instead of a dedicated video player.

== Linear video ads ==
Linear video ads are full-screen spots inserted into a video stream, interrupting playback similar to a television commercial. The IAB names three placement types by when the ad runs relative to the publisher's content:

=== Pre-roll ===
Pre-roll runs before the requested clip starts. IAB guidelines cap pre-roll linear ads at 30 seconds and recommend that they be host-initiated, meaning the publisher's player triggers the ad rather than the user. It is the most common linear format on publisher sites, streaming platforms, and video on demand services.

=== Mid-roll ===
Mid-roll breaks occur during playback, at points comparable to television commercial pods. They are used in longer clips, live streams, and extended news or entertainment video. IAB guidelines limit mid-roll linear ads to 30 seconds.

On major streaming platforms, mid-roll breaks often run longer in practice. YouTube serves skippable in-stream mid-roll ads with no maximum duration, non-skippable mid-roll spots of up to 60 seconds, and ad pods of two consecutive commercials on videos at least five minutes long. Updated IAB Tech Lab digital video guidelines also list 60-second spots as commonly accepted during extended mid-roll ad slots.

=== Post-roll ===
Post-roll runs after the main content finishes. Publishers may accept longer post-roll spots than the 30-second cap on pre-roll and mid-roll.

Ad servers pass linear placement cues to players through standards such as VAST, which defines separate request points for pre-roll, mid-roll, and post-roll delivery.

== See also ==
- Online advertising
- Television advertisement
- Smart TV
- Streaming media
