= In-game advertising =

Advertising in electronic games

In-game advertising (IGA) is advertising in electronic games. IGA differs from advergames, which refers to games specifically made to advertise a product. The IGA industry is large and growing.

In-game advertising generated $34 million in 2004, $56 million in 2005, $80 million in 2006, and $295 million in 2007. In 2009, spending on IGA was estimated to reach $699 million USD, $1 billion by 2014 and according to Forbes is anticipated to grow to $7.2 billion by 2016.

The earliest known IGA was the 1978 computer game Adventureland, which inserted a self-promotional advertisement for its next game, Pirate Adventure.

IGA can be integrated into the game either through a display in the background, such as an in-game billboard or a commercial during the pause created when a game loads, or highly integrated within the game so that the advertised product is necessary to complete part of the game or is featured prominently within cutscenes. Due to the custom programming required, dynamic advertising is usually presented in the background; static advertisements can appear as either. One of the advantages of IGA over traditional advertisements is that consumers are less likely to multitask with other media while playing a game, however, some attention is still divided between the gameplay, controls, and the advertisement.

== Static in-game advertising ==
Similar to product placement in the film industry, static IGAs cannot be changed after they are programmed directly into the game (unless it's completely online). However, unlike product placement in traditional media, IGA allows gamers to interact with the virtual product. For example, Splinter Cell has required the use of in-game Sony Ericsson phones to catch terrorists. Unlike static IGAs, dynamic IGAs are not limited to a developer and publisher determined pre-programmed size or location and allow the advertiser to customize the advertisement display.

A number of games utilize billboard-like advertisements or product placement to create a realistic gaming environment. For example, many sports games incorporate these advertisements to simulate the heavy advertising within professional sports. Similarly, many games employ brand-name products such as guns and cars as in-game status symbols. These brand references may not be advertisements and are instead placed in the game purely for plot or design reasons. However, trademark owners sometimes object to unlicensed references to their trademarks. See, e.g., E.S.S. Entertainment 2000, Inc. v. Rock Star Videos, Inc.

Chupa Chups products can be seen in the background of Zool.

An Adidas billboard is in FIFA International Soccer (also, an electronic board appearing after each goal sometimes reads "Panasonic").

== Dynamic in-game advertising ==
A poster campaign for Tripping the Rift in SWAT 4

Increasing Internet connectivity and bandwidth has increased the use of dynamic IGA, which allows the game manufacturer or its advertisement vendor to deliver advertisements remotely, update advertisements after the game is launched, and target advertisements based on time or geography. This approach combines the customization of web banners with the functionality of traditional billboards and posters as most in-game advertisements do not link to a website outside the game. Dynamic IGAs allow the game manufacturer or its advertisement delivery service to track advertisements in real time and capture viewing data such as screen time, type of advertisement, and viewing angle. This information may be used to improve future advertisement campaigns and to correct copy problems or make a current advertisement more appealing to players.

Dynamic advertising campaigns allow IGA to be part of a time-sensitive advertisement campaign because they do not need to be designed months or years before the game is finished. Dynamic advertisements can be purchased after a game is released to the general public are featured in a developer determined in-game location. For example, in October 2008, billboard advertisements were purchased in 10 swing states by then-US Democratic presidential candidate Barack Obama in numerous Xbox games.

== Advertising in online-only games ==
=== Freemium and free-to-play ===
Freemium and free-to-play games are typically playable online and provide a free basic game with options for players to purchase advanced features or additional items. They operate under the theory that a gamer will pay for additional in-game features after investing enough time in the game. In freemium games like Farmville, these transactions are typically one-time payments for specific in-game goods (micro-transactions). Free-to-play games like Age of Conan instead try to induce players to enter into a pay-to-play relationship for premium content. While typically generating income though these other revenue sources, freemium and free-to-play games often feature advertisements as well via splash advertisements or advertiser sponsorships of virtual-good giveaways as additional income.

=== Pay-to-play ===
Pay-to-play games charge players to access the game content. Depending on the game environment, some pay-to-play games feature IGA. For example, City of Heroes and Anarchy Online both use dynamic IGA in an urban game setting to mimic real world stimuli. In contrast, fantasy games such as EverQuest II and World of Warcraft may not include IGA when real-world advertisements do not fit contextually. Blizzard has previously remarked that it would not consider using IGA within World of Warcraft; conversely, SOE experimented briefly with an in-game command-line function allowing players to order food delivery from Pizza Hut in EverQuest II.

Virtual worlds and MMORPGs may host persistent online advertisements by allowing marketers to purchase virtual real estate. Aside from establishing a brand presence, companies can use it to test future real-world locations. For example, the Aloft Hotels brand was established within Second Life prior to the completion of its real-world counterpart.

== Advertising industry reaction to IGA ==
The advertising industry has generally embraced IGA and advergaming as effective ways to reach 16 to 34-year-old males. IGA is seen as an important means of gaining access to a generation of young males who use gaming as their relaxation activity instead of watching television. Advertisers may also appreciate IGA's economic returns; a 2010 Nielsen Company study showed that IGA had a return on investment of $3.11 per dollar spent. In 2007, Nielsen Media Research branched out into the IGA space by announcing a video games ratings service, GamePlay Metrics, to serve in-game advertisers and measure IGA effectiveness.

Several advertising agencies or ad networks specialize in IGA, and even more traditional advertising agencies have experimented with IGA. However, many advertisers do not embrace video games as a viable advertising medium because of the continuing difficulties in measuring IGA's effectiveness despite the implementation of GamePlay Metrics, uncertainty about how many viewers the game will reach, and the long development cycle inherent in video games.

=== Reducing advertiser risk ===
Viewer numbers are hard to estimate because it is difficult to gauge the popularity of a game before its release; however, advertiser risk can be partially mitigated through benchmark-based advertisement payments on game units sold or a refund agreement if a certain number of game sales are not reached. This may not, however, protect the advertiser from an unwanted association with a poorly performing game or advertisement.

It is also difficult to plan in-game advertisements because game development generally takes longer than the development and implementation of an advertising campaign; typically, most static advertisements must be disclosed to the developers at least eighteen months before a game is released. This timing discrepancy can be solved though use of dynamic advertisements, which are available for purchase at any time in-game space is available, but this choice constrains the advertisement to the in-game predetermined spaces and sizes and does not allow for highly integrated static ads.

== Game industry reaction ==
Game publishers have mixed feelings about IGA. IGA can create new revenue streams; in some cases publishers' profits have increased by an extra $1–2 per game unit sold (in addition to the typical $5–6 profit per unit). Some mobile phone games have replaced charging fees to gamers with IGA, and it is an important source of income for browser-based and other Internet games that do not feature micro-transactions or pay-to-play. Some publishers see IGA as a way to offset growing game development costs, while others believe IGA will allow them to experiment with gameplay by reducing the financial risks associated with game development.

However, not all publishers have found IGA successful. In 2008, Sony Corporation expressed doubts about advertisement-funded games because of limited advertiser dollars and gamers' skepticism of IGA, although Sony completed an IGA deal 5 months later. However, in 2010, an Electronic Arts representative remarked, "We actually aren't getting much from ad revenue at all. The in-game advertisement business hasn't grown as fast as people expected it to."

Another issue publishers and developers must deal with is integrating IGA into games without alienating or frustrating players. The general goal of IGA is to insert advertising that gets noticed while not interrupting the player's enjoyment of the game. Developers need some creative control of the IGA to ensure it fits the virtual setting, which can be an issue because advertisers usually want to project a certain image and protect their brand image. Game companies worry that they may be forced to change the game as requested by advertisers if IGA becomes a common revenue source, and face a possible backlash from consumers. In some games it may be easier to rely on revenue from sales of virtual goods, as they may provide a more reliable and greater stream of income than advertising while having the advantage of being directly incorporated into the game experience and being under the complete creative control of the developer.

== Gamer reaction ==
Gamer reaction to IGA has also been mixed. A 2009 study by an advertising company found that 80% of consumers correctly recalled an advertiser and 56% had a more favorable impression of the advertiser because it allowed them to play a free game. However, companies have found that gamers do not want distracting advertisements when they have already paid the retail price and/or a monthly subscription fee. Gamers have shown a distaste for advertisements that distract them while they are trying to enjoy themselves. A small, 100 participant, 2010 study suggested that gamers may be more likely to favorably respond to advertisements and products which are congruent with the game environment.

Gamers may feel that IGA is invasive and in some cases have dubbed IGA-supported software as spyware. Some gamers choose to remove advertisements from the game experience, either by paying more for an advertisement-free copy or disabling the advertisements through exploits.

In-game advertising can also lead to negative reviews for a video game, as occurred in 2013 with Maxis' promotion of a heavily branded Nissan Leaf charging station as downloadable content in SimCity. Maxis claimed "Plopping down the station will add happiness to nearby buildings. It will not take power, water, or workers away from your city."

== Effectiveness ==
Several academic researchers have attempted to understand how effective IGA is. The effectiveness of such advertising is debated by several scholars. Yang et al. found some types of recognition were low among college students, although players did retain word fragments in sports games. Grace and Coyle found that 35% of players could recall advertised brands in a controlled study of car racing games. Lee and Faber found that the primary factors for player-retention of IGA are location of brand messages in the game, game involvement, and prior game-playing experience.

== See also ==
- Interactive advertising
- Advergaming
