= List of advertising technology companies =

This is a list of online advertising technology companies.

- 4INFO
- Adbot
- Adform
- Adobe Systems
- ADTECH
- Adtile Technologies
- Afilias
- Alawar Entertainment
- Amazon.com
- AppLovin
- AppNexus
- Badgeville
- BrightRoll
- Comcast Advertising
- comScore
- Criteo
- Daylife
- Digital Element
- dotMobi
- eBuddy
- eDirectory
- Enplug
- Facebook
- Fiksu
- Fluent, Inc.
- Google Inc.
- InMobi
- Integral Ad Science
- Kidoz
- Marin Software
- Matomy Media
- mBlox
- Media.net
- Metaverse Mod Squad
- Neustar
- Newsmax Media
- Nielsen Holdings
- OpenMarket
- OpenX
- Optimal Payments
- OrangeSoda
- Oracle Corporation
- Perion
- Pubmatic
- Quantcast
- Rapleaf
- Rocket Fuel
- Rubicon Project
- Sedo
- Sitecore
- Smaato
- Softlayer
- Softonic
- Sony DADC
- Taykey
- The Trade Desk
- Triton Digital
- TubeMogul
- Unified
- Velti
- Venable LLP
- VideoAmp
- Yippy
- YuMe
- ZEDO
- Zeta Interactive
