= Comcast Advertising =

- Formerly: Comcast Advertising Sales, Comcast Spotlight, Effectv, Comcast Advanced Advertising Group
- Type: Subsidiary
- Industry: Advertising
- Founded: 1997; 29 years ago
- Headquarters: New York, United States
- Area served: Worldwide
- Key people: Marcien Jenckes, James Rooke
- Parent: Comcast

Comcast Advertising is the advertising sales and technology division of Comcast Corporation. The organization is responsible for monetizing advertising across Comcast's cable, television, streaming, and digital video platforms and for developing advertising technology and data solutions that support advanced audience targeting. The business traces its origins to Comcast's early cable advertising operations and has evolved through several brand identities and organizational structures, including Comcast Advertising Sales, Comcast Spotlight, the Comcast Advanced Advertising Group, and Effectv. In April 2025, Comcast consolidated its advertising operations under the Comcast Advertising name, with Comcast Media Solutions designated as the primary customer-facing advertising sales organization.

== History ==
Comcast Advertising Sales was founded in 1997. Comcast went on to acquire other local cable systems through 2004. These advertising operations were decentralized and aligned with individual cable systems and regional markets. Comcast's expansion over the years increased the scale of such operations but also created operational complexity. Comcast hired Charlie Thurston, formerly President & CEO of AdLink, to be president of ad sales and spot cable. Thurston called this process Spotlight 1.0, a rebrand of Comcast Advertising Sales. Key developments included the expansion of cable interconnects, which allowed advertisers to buy inventory across multiple cable systems within a market through a single transaction, and the growth of video-on-demand advertising. He later explained that Spotlight 2.0 included telecommunications and satellite-based cable. Starting in 2007, deals with Verizon, AT&T, DirecTV and DISH Network allowed Comcast to expand beyond Comcast households. In 2011, Comcast Spotlight introduced I+, an audience-based buying initiative designed to simplify planning and buying across cable networks within a market. By the late 2010s, Comcast Spotlight became one of the largest sellers of local and regional television advertising in the United States.

In 2017, Comcast unified its television distribution, sales and advertising technology products and solutions under one organization, Comcast Advanced Advertising Group, with two divisions: Comcast Spotlight as the advertising sales division of Comcast Cable and Comcast's Advanced Advertising Group, composed of Strata, FreeWheel, and Visible World. Then in November 2019, Comcast Spotlight rebranded as Effectv. The Effectv name was sunset in April 2025, following Comcast's introduction of a new Media Solutions Team within Comcast Advertising as a business name.

Under this structure:

- Comcast Media Solutions manages advertiser relationships and media sales across linear television, streaming, and cross-platform video.
- Comcast Advertising functions as the overarching division, encompassing sales, technology, data, and partnerships.

Later in 2025, Comcast Advertising opened up a portal wherein advertisers, as buyers, could use the FreeWheel Buyer Cloud to bid on linear TV ads.

== Advertising technology and platform structure ==
Within Comcast Advertising, FreeWheel serves as the central advertising technology organization. Over time, Comcast consolidated its advertising technology assets:

- FreeWheel provides ad serving, yield management, and programmatic monetization technology for premium video across linear and streaming environments.
- Strata operates as a FreeWheel company, offering media planning, buying, and trafficking software used by advertising agencies and media companies.
- VisibleWorld operates within the FreeWheel organization, contributing addressable television capabilities such as household-level targeting and dynamic creative versioning.

== See also ==
- Television advertising
- Advertising technology
- List of advertising technology companies
