= Tatango =

U.S. company offering SMS/MMS marketing services

- Type: dot-com company
- Industry: Short Messaging Service
- Founded: October 2007; 19 years ago
- Founder: Derek Johnson
- Headquarters: Seattle, Washington, U.S.
- Key people: CEO Derek Johnson, Alex Mittelstaedt (Director of Sales)
- Services: Short Messaging Service
- Website: www.tatango.com
- Footnotes; Alexa Rank: ▼79,439 (April 2014)

Tatango is a U.S. based company offering text message marketing (SMS/MMS) services. Tatango is a privately held corporation based in Seattle, Washington with investments from the Seattle Alliance of Angels.

== History ==
Derek Johnson developed the service, originally named NetworkText, during his time at the University of Houston's Bauer College of Business. Initially, it was started as a way for his fraternity (Delta Upsilon) to communicate.

Initially operating as NetworkText, Tatango allowed groups and organizations to send text messages to their members, with 30-40 character advertisements included at the bottom of each message. The service was free for groups and organizations in collaboration with 4INFO. This was later changed on July 26, 2008, and the company started charging a monthly fee to use the service.

Johnson left college and moved to Bellingham, WA, where he founded NetworkText with Matt Pelo. Pelo left the company later that year. In 2008, the company was renamed Tatango, and offices were established. Tatango moved from being a limited-liability company to a corporation late in 2008. In October that same year, Tatango launched a voice messaging service which has since been discontinued.

Tatango acquired HungryThumb in 2012, followed by Broadtexter the following year. In 2016 Tatango launched the U.S. Short Code Directory.

In 2022, Kevin Fitzgerald became the CEO, and Derek Johnson became Chief Innovation Officer.

== Highlights ==
- In 2009, Tatango's CEO was included in Business Week's "Best Young Entrepreneurs" list.

== Press ==
- Tatango has been mentioned in media outlets such as TechCrunch, Cnet, The Seattle Times, and LifeHacker.
- Former Tatango CEO, Derek Johnson, has been featured in The Wall Street Journal.
- Mentioned in the Forbes article "Killer app of the 2012 election".
