= Harry L. Straus =

American horse racing executive

Henry Straus
- Born: March 10, 1896; Maryland, US
- Died: October 25, 1949 (aged 53); Port Deposit, Maryland, US
- Education: Baltimore City College; Johns Hopkins University (Class of 1917)
- Occupation(s): Electrical engineer, entrepreneur, computer pioneer, horse racing executive, owner & breeder of Thoroughbred horses and Shorthorn cattle
- Known for: "Tote" machine
- Board member of: American Totalisator; Tropical Park Race Track; Maryland Horse Breeders Association, Cherry Hill Farm
- Spouse: Jeannette Eareckson
- Honors: Henry L. Straus Handicap at Tropical Park Race Track

Henry Lobe Straus (March 10, 1896 – October 25, 1949) was an American electrical engineer, horse and cattle breeder, sportsman, entrepreneur and computer pioneer.

== Biography ==
Straus was a 1913 graduate of the Baltimore City College high school and a graduate electrical engineer of Johns Hopkins University.

On April 26, 1927, Henry Straus was at a racetrack in Havre de Grace, Maryland. He had bet $10 on a horse showing twelve-to-one odds. The horse won, and Straus expected to collect about $120. However, the final odds, announced 10 minutes after the race, were less than four-to-one, and he collected only $36. Disappointed, Straus decided to do something about it. A machine for calculating parimutuel odds, issuing tickets, and showing payouts on horse races was called a totalisator; George Julius had invented a mechanical version that was first used in New Zealand in 1913. Straus devised an "electromechanical totalisator".

Straus received help from General Electric's Remote Control Division, who supplied the electric relays and rotary switches to compute odds. After he struggled for several years to market his invention and compete with electric totalisators used in Britain, Pimlico Race Course installed a partial system in 1930, and Arlington Park racecourse, Chicago, Illinois, installed the United States' first complete all-electric totalisator, from Straus's company, in 1933.

A rival machine maker approached Straus and proposed a collaboration. The resulting company, the American Totalisator Company of Baltimore, dominated the parimutuel betting market for years. Henry Straus grew wealthy as his all electric totalisator became a near-universal fixture in racetracks in Europe and North America.

By the 1946, Straus had begun to experiment with an all-electronic calculating system for the totalisator. Then, in 1948, he learned of the work that John W. Mauchly and Presper Eckert were doing with the EDVAC and BINAC computers. Straus became convinced that electronic computers had enormous potential for a range of applications, including applications in the race track business.

In 1948, Straus convinced the directors of American Totalisator to invest $500,000 to shore up the financially troubled Eckert-Mauchly Computer Corporation which was then developing UNIVAC, the first electronic digital computer designed for commercial use. American Totalisator received 40 percent of the EMCC stock, Straus became chairman of the EMCC board and was active in the business side of operations. Within a year, EMCC was a healthy corporation with contracts for UNIVACs worth $1.2 million.

On October 25, 1949, Henry Straus was killed in a plane crash, and soon after the American Totalisator's directors withdrew their support from EMCC. Eckert and Mauchly were forced to look for a buyer, and sold their company to Remington Rand in 1950.

== Thoroughbred racing ==
Henry Straus developed his invention because of his love of Thoroughbred racing. With wealth from his business success, he became an owner of racehorses and would acquire the Tropical Park Race Track in Coral Gables, Florida which he owned at the time of his death. Among his best horses was Pilaster, a winner of a number of stakes races including the Pimlico Cup and Miami Beach Handicap.
