= Eckert–Mauchly Computer Corporation =

American company

- Formerly: Electronic Control Company (1946–1947)
- Industry: Technology
- Founded: March 1946; 79 years ago
- Founders: J. Presper Eckert, John Mauchly
- Defunct: February 1950; 75 years ago
- Fate: sold to Remington Rand
- Headquarters: Philadelphia
- Products: Computers

The Eckert–Mauchly Computer Corporation (EMCC) (March 1946 – 1950) was a computer company founded by J. Presper Eckert and John Mauchly. It was incorporated on December 22, 1947. After building the ENIAC at the University of Pennsylvania, Eckert and Mauchly formed EMCC to build new computer designs for commercial and military applications. The company was initially called the Electronic Control Company, changing its name to Eckert–Mauchly Computer Corporation when it was incorporated. In 1950, the company was sold to Remington Rand, which later merged with Sperry Corporation to become Sperry Rand, and survives today as Unisys.

== Founding ==
Before founding Eckert–Mauchly Computer Corporation, Mauchly researched the computing needs of potential clients. Over a period of six months in 1944 he prepared memos and kept detailed notes of his conversations. For instance, Mauchly met with United States Census Bureau official William Madow to discuss the computing equipment they desired. The Census Bureau was particularly keen on reducing the number of punch cards it had to manage with each census. This meeting led to Madow making a trip to see ENIAC in person. Mauchly also met with Lt. Colonel Solomon Kullback, an official at the Army Signal Corps, to discuss codes and ciphers. Kullback said there was a need for many "faster and more flexible" computers at his agency. Mauchly responded by carefully analyzing EDVAC's potential encryption and decryption abilities. Eckert and Mauchly thus believed there was strong government demand for their future products.

By the spring of 1946, Eckert and Mauchly had procured a U.S. Army contract for the University of Pennsylvania and were already designing the EDVAC – the successor machine to the ENIAC – at the university's Moore School of Electrical Engineering. However, new university policies that would have forced Eckert and Mauchly to sign over intellectual property rights for their inventions led to their resignation, which caused a lengthy delay in the EDVAC design efforts. After seeking to join IBM and John von Neumann's team at the Institute for Advanced Study in Princeton, New Jersey, they decided to start their own company, the Electronic Controls Corporation, in an office at 1215 Walnut St. in Philadelphia, Pennsylvania.

== UNIVAC ==
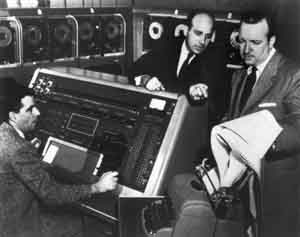
UNIVAC featured on CBS TV, presidential election night, 1952. J. Presper Eckert (center), co-designer of the UNIVAC, and Harold Sweeny of the US Census Bureau, with Walter Cronkite (right)

Mauchly persuaded the United States Census Bureau to order an "EDVAC II" computer – a model that was soon renamed UNIVAC – receiving a contract in 1948 that called for having the machine ready for the 1950 census. Eckert hired a staff that included a number of the engineers from the Moore School, and the company launched an ambitious program to design and manufacture large-scale computing machines. A major achievement was the use of magnetic tape for high-speed storage. During development Mauchly continued to solicit new customers and started a software department. They developed applications, starting with the world's first compiler for the language Short Code. The core group of programmers were also hired from the Moore School: Kathleen McNulty, Betty Holberton, Grace Hopper, and Jean Bartik.

=== Accusations of communist infiltration ===
EMCC also received contracts for one UNIVAC machine each for the Army, Navy, and Air Force. These contracts were eventually canceled after the company was accused of having hired engineers with "Communistic leanings" during the McCarthy era. The company lost its clearance for government work. Company president and chief salesman Mauchly was banned from the company property. He challenged the accusations, but it took two years before a hearing allowed him to work at his company again; by then the UNIVAC was seriously behind schedule. The programming to allow the UNIVAC I to be used in predicting the outcome of the 1952 Presidential election had to be done by Mauchly and University of Pennsylvania statistician Max Woodbury at Mauchly's home in Ambler, Pennsylvania.

== BINAC and fiscal difficulties ==
Cash flow was poor and the UNIVAC would not be finished for quite some time, so EMCC decided to take on another project that would be done quickly. This was the BINAC, a small computer (compared to ENIAC) for the Northrop corporation. Original estimates for the development costs proved to be extremely unrealistic, and by the summer of 1948, EMCC had just about run out of money, but it was temporarily saved by Harry L. Straus, vice president of the American Totalisator Company, a Baltimore company that made electromechanical totalisators. Straus felt that EMCC's work, besides being promising in general terms, might have some application in the race track business, and invested $500,000 in the company. Straus became chairman of the EMCC board, and American Totalisator received 40 percent of the stock. When Straus was killed in an airplane crash in October 1949, American Totalisator's directors withdrew their support.

BINAC was assembled in the EMCC workshop on 3747 Ridge Ave. in Philadelphia, and eventually delivered in 1949, but Northrop complained that it never worked well for them. (It had worked fine in acceptance tests at EMCC, but Northrop, citing security concerns, refused to allow any EMCC employees onto their site to reassemble it after shipping. Instead, Northrop hired a newly graduated electrical engineer to assemble it. EMCC claimed that the fact that it worked at all after this was testimony to the quality of the design.) It was generally believed at EMCC that Northrop allowed BINAC to sit, disassembled, in their parking lot for a long time before any effort toward assembly was made.

== Sale to Remington Rand ==
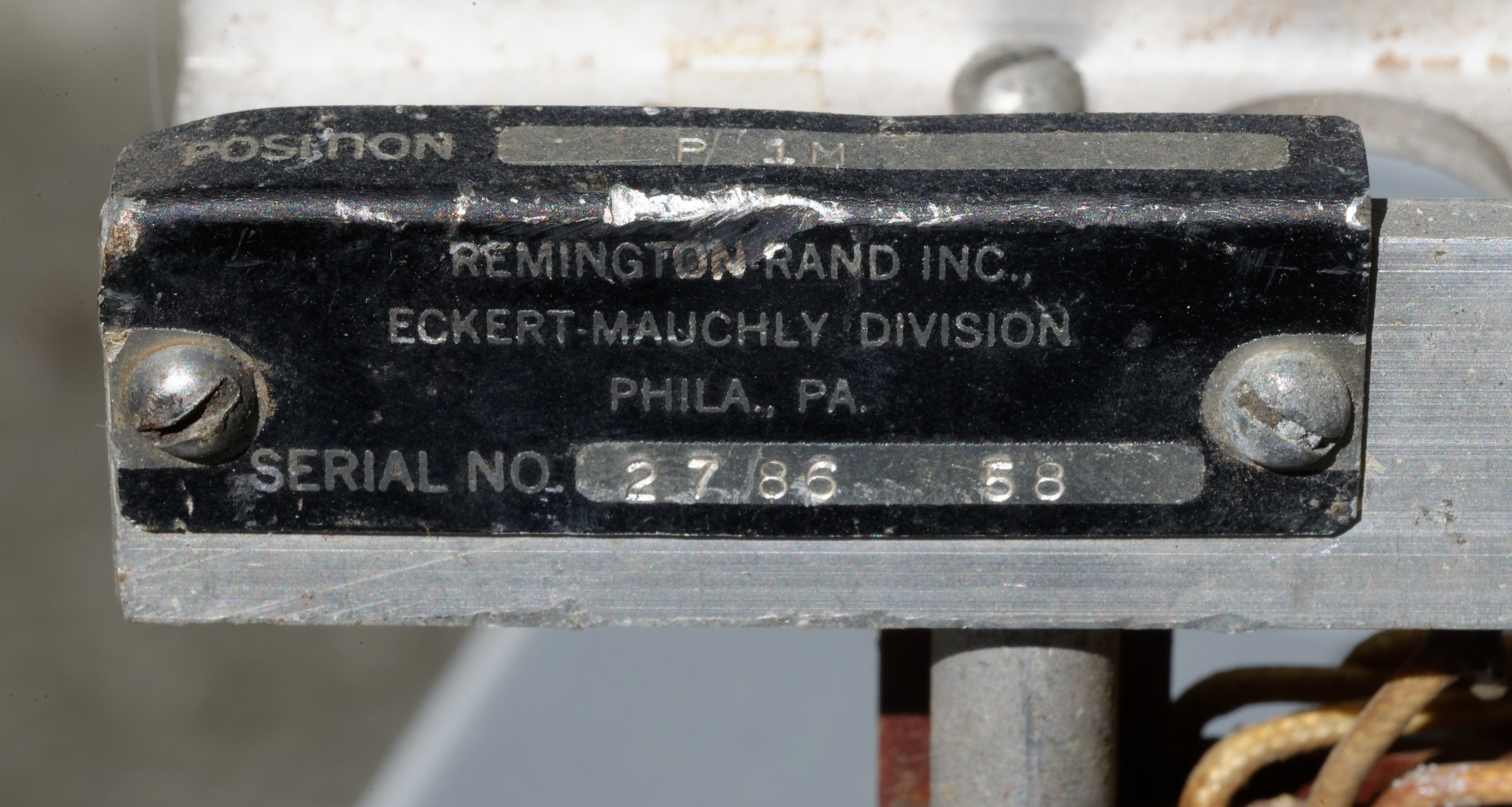
Name plate showing Eckert-Mauchly division of Remington Rand

As had happened with BINAC, EMCC's estimates of delivery dates and costs proved to be optimistic, and the company was soon in financial difficulty again. In early 1950, the company was for sale; potential buyers included National Cash Register and Remington Rand. Remington Rand made the first offer, and purchased EMCC on February 15, 1950, whereupon it became the "Eckert-Mauchly Computer Corp Subsidiary of Remington Rand", later the "Eckert-Mauchly Division of Remington Rand", then the UNIVAC division of Remington Rand and finally then "Remington Rand UNIVAC division of Sperry Rand Corp". The first UNIVAC was not delivered until March 1951, over a year after EMCC was acquired by Remington Rand, and too late to help much for the 1950 census. However, upon acceptance at the company premises, truck load after truck load of punched cards arrived to be recorded on tape (by what was called jokingly the card to pulp converters) for processing by UNIVAC. The US Census Bureau used the prototype UNIVAC on EMCC premises for months.

Mauchly resigned from Remington Rand in 1952; his 10-year contract with them ran until 1960, and prohibited him from working on other computer projects during that time. Remington Rand merged with Sperry Corporation in 1955, and in 1975, the division was renamed Sperry UNIVAC. The company's corporate descendant today is Unisys.
