= Pilaster (disambiguation) =

Pilaster is a decorative architectural element.

It may also refer to:

- Pilaster (anatomy), part of the human femur
- Pilaster (horse), a racehorse
