= Appnovation =

Software company in Canada

- Company type: Private
- Industry: IT Services, Business Services
- Founded: 2007; 19 years ago
- Founder: Arnold Leung, CEO
- Headquarters: Vancouver, BC; Other offices: Atlanta, London, Brazil, Malaysia, Toronto, Montreal, New York, Boston, San Francisco, Cardiff, Hong Kong & Saint John
- Area served: Worldwide
- Key people: Arnold Leung (CEO)
- Services: Digital consulting, Strategy & Insights, Creative & Experience Design, Data Analytics & Insights, AI, Technology, Platform Development, Engineering UX services, web, Intranet & Mobile App Development. Middleware & Big Data Services.
- Number of employees: 462 (July 2021)
- Website: appnovation.com

Appnovation is a global, full service digital consultancy firm with headquarters in Canada, specializing in web, intranet and mobile application development using open technologies including Drupal and Alfresco, HTML5 frameworks like SproutCore and PhoneGap, as well as middleware, Big Data and business intelligence services using Mulesoft, Hadoop and MongoDB. Appnovation is one of five companies in Canada to achieve Platinum Partner status with Alfresco Software, Inc. and Enterprise Select Partner status with Acquia.

== History ==
Founded in 2007 in Vancouver, British Columbia, Canada by CEO Arnold Leung. During its first year in business, Appnovation Technologies helped the current Tatango launch the older version of the mobile texting platform called NetworkText. By 2009, the company had grown to become the 15th biggest web development company in Vancouver.

In 2010, Appnovation was ranked #16 in PROFIT's Profit Hot 50 List and Leung was included on Business in Vancouver's Top Forty Under 40 list. In 2011, Leung was also named BDC's Young Entrepreneur of the Year for British Columbia and Appnovation was a finalist in the Small Business BC "Successful You Awards" in the Best Company category.

In 2011, the company's revenue had tripled from the previous year, at $4.2 million. In 2014, the company opened an office in Montreal, Quebec and a sales and development centre in Saint John, New Brunswick. In the same year, the company was included in the Deloitte Fast 50 of fastest-growing Canadian technology companies.

The company now also has U.S. offices in Atlanta, Boston, New York City and San Francisco, European offices in Cardiff, London, Ghent, Utrecht, and an office in Hong Kong.

In 2016, the company was again included in the Deloitte "Fast 50" and Fast 500, with 449% growth between 2012, and 2015.

In late 2016, Appnovation completed its first acquisition, buying the digital agency Wunderkraut Benelux, which brought their number of employees to 250.

Moving ahead to April 2020, Appnovation worked with the Ministry of Health in British Columbia on digital solutions to help lessen the risk COVID-19 cross-contamination between province-wide healthcare facilities. This project focused on the development of business processes, digital systems and real-time collaboration to support the collection, analysis and reporting of personnel data that allowed health authorities to make decisions about provincial healthcare resourcing and implement a Single Site Staffing initiative.

In September 2020, Appnovation secured $11.6 million from backers including a partnership between UK-based Business Growth Fund (BGF), Export Development Canada (EDC) and Canadian Business Growth Fund (CBGF). According to CEO Arnold Leung, the funding will be used to continue the company's global expansion and growth strategy.

== Awards and recognition ==
In 2017, the company received the EMEA 'Best New Partner' award at the MuleSoft Connect conference. Other awards include the 2013 Blue Drop Award for the best Marketplace/eCommerce Website, an Acquia "Partner Site of the Year" award for the mobile category, and the Alfresco "Partner Solution of the Year" for osCaddie.
