= Pimlico Cup =

- Class: Discontinued stakes
- Location: Pimlico Race Course, Baltimore, Maryland
- Inaugurated: 1919
- Race type: Thoroughbred - Flat racing

Race information
- Surface: Dirt
- Track: left-handed
- Qualification: Three years old & up

The Pimlico Cup Handicap was an American horse race for Thoroughbreds run between 1919 and 1961 at Pimlico Race Course in Baltimore, Maryland. A long-distance race on dirt for stayers age three an older, twenty-three of its twenty-five runnings were run at more than two miles.

== Historical notes ==
Future U. S. Racing Hall of Fame inductee Exterminator won the first three runnings of the Pimlico Cup beginning with the inaugural edition on November 13, 1919.

The race of November 15, 1924, won by Altawood, was run in a snowstorm so heavy at times that the horses were barely visible and the colors undistinguishable.

The Pimlico Cup was not run from 1931 through 1943 as a result of cutbacks necessitated by the Great Depression. Restarting was delayed further by the December 1941 entry of the United States into World War II. On its return in 1944, Megogo set a new track record for 2 1/2 miles with a time of 4:20 1/5.

In 1947 the filly Miss Grillo, trained by future U.S. Racing Hall of Fame inductee Horatio Luro and owned by the Mill River Stable of Josephine Douglas, won the 2 1/2 mile Pimlico Cup by forty lengths. Nearing the finish, Jockey Conn McCreary eased Miss Grillo then stood up in the stirrups and waved to the crowd. The next year Miss Grillo won the race again for Josephine Douglas. Her winning time of 4:14 3/5 broke the world record for 2 1/2 miles by two seconds, a record which had stood for twenty-six years.

Pilaster won the November 12, 1949, edition of the Pimlico Cup running temporarily under the name of trainer Frank Bonsal because owner Henry Lobe Straus had died in an October 25 airplane crash.

Wise Margin's time of 3:37 flat in his 1956 win broke the track record for two miles and a sixteenth. Four years later Beau Diable broke Wise Margin's record when winning the 1960 Pimlico Cup in 3:35 3/5.

The final running of the Pimlico Cup took place on December 9, 1961, on a racetrack covered with snow. It was won by Sunshine Cake owned by Bayard Sharp, a founding director of Delaware Park Racetrack and a former president of The Blood-Horse Inc.

== Records ==
Speed record:

- 3:52.20 @ 2 1/4 miles : Edith Cavell
- 4:14.60 @ 2 1/2 miles : Miss Grillo

Most wins:

- 3 - Exterminator (1919, 1920, 1921)

Most wins by a jockey:

- 2 - Conn McCreary (1947, 1948)
- 2 - Nick Shuk (1951, 1956)
- 2 - Karl Korte (1958, 1959)

Most wins by a trainer:

- 3 - Horatio Luro (1946, 1947, 1948)

Most wins by an owner:

- 3 - Willis Sharpe Kilmer (1919, 1920, 1921)

== Winners ==
Year	Winner	Age	Jockey	Trainer	Owner	Dist. (Miles)	Time	Win$
1961	Sunshine Cake	3	Tommy Lee	Charles Peoples	Bayard Sharp	21/16	3:38.80	$6,955
1960	Beau Diable	7	Steve Brooks	George P. "Maje" Odom	Laudy L. Lawrence	21/16	3:35.60	$13,646
1959	Cross Channel	5	Karl Korte	Edward A. Christmas	Howell E. Jackson III	11/2	2:33.40	$7,703
1958	Cross Channel	4	Karl Korte	Edward A. Christmas	Howell E. Jackson III	13/8	2:11.20	$7,146
1957	Race not held							
1956	Wise Margin	6	Nick Shuk	Sam N. Edmundson	Samuel Tufano	21/16	3:37.00	$9,600
1952	1955	Race not held						
1951	Pilaster	7	Nick Shuk	Frank A. Bonsal	Mrs. Henry Lobe Straus	21/2	4:29.40	$20,325
1950	Double Brandy	4	Frank Bone	Norval L. Schwartz	C. Ewing Tuttle	21/2	4:24.00	$11,025
1949	Pilaster	5	Carson Kirk	Frank A. Bonsal	Frank A. Bonsal	21/2	4:20.00	$11,225
1948	Miss Grillo	6	Conn McCreary	Horatio Luro	Mill River Stable	21/2	4:14.60	$20,750
1947	Miss Grillo	5	Conn McCreary	Horatio Luro	Mill River Stable	21/2	4:29.80	$19,200
1946	Rico Monte	4	Ruperto Donoso	Horatio Luro	W. Arnold Hanger	21/2	4:25.20	$23,350
1945	Stymie	4	Robert Permane	Hirsch Jacobs	Ethel D. Jacobs	21/2	4:35.20	$21,600
1944	Megogo	3	Kenneth Scawthorne	John A. Healey	Christiana Stables	21/2	4:20.20	$22,050
1931	1943	Race not held						
1930	Mirbat	5	Willie Cannon	James W. Healy	Edward R. Bradley	21/4	4:04.40	$9,025
1929	Diavolo	4	James H. Burke	James E. Fitzsimmons	Wheatley Stable	21/4	3:54.80	$9,050
1928	Edith Cavell	5	Alfred Robertson	Scott Harlan	Walter M. Jeffords Sr.	21/4	3:53.00	$9,525
1927	Display	4	John Maiben	Thomas J. Healey	Walter J. Salmon Sr.	21/4	3:56.20	$8,825
1926	Edith Cavell	3	Ovila Bourassa	Scott Harlan	Walter M. Jeffords Sr.	21/4	3:52.20	$8,325
1925	Rockminister	6	James Wallace	S. Miller Henderson	Audley Farm Stable	21/4	3:58.00	$8,900
1924	Altawood	3	Ivan H. Parke	G. Hamilton Keene	Joseph E. Widener	21/4	3:57.00	$7,950
1923	Hephaistos	4	John Callahan	Frank E. Brown	Frank E. Brown	21/4	3:58.60	$6,950
1922	Captain Alcock	5	Linus McAtee	James E. Fitzsimmons	Quincy Stable	21/4	3:53.40	$7,100
1921	Exterminator	6	Albert Johnson	Willie Knapp	Willis Sharpe Kilmer	21/4	4:08.20	$6,800
1920	Exterminator	5	Lavelle Ensor	William L. McDaniel	Willis Sharpe Kilmer	21/4	3:53.00	$7,100
1919	Exterminator	4	Clarence Kummer	Henry McDaniel	Willis Sharpe Kilmer	21/4	4:13.00	$3,450
