= Nick Shuk =

American jockey

Personal information
- Born: September 30, 1930 Downers Grove, Illinois; United States
- Died: October 1983 (aged 53)
- Occupation: Jockey

Horse racing career
- Sport: Horse racing
- Career wins: 2,668

Major racing wins
- Laurel Futurity Stakes (1951); Pimlico Cup (1951, 1956); Champagne Stakes (1952); Delaware Oaks (1952); Barbara Fritchie Handicap (1952, 1958); Ladies Handicap (1952); Hialeah Turf Cup Handicap (1952); Canadian International Stakes (1953); Toboggan Handicap (1953); Gotham Stakes (1953); Jerome Handicap (1953); Monmouth Oaks (1953); Peter Pan Stakes (1953); Rowe Memorial Handicap (1953, 1954); Southern Maryland Handicap (1953); Fort McHenry Handicap (1954); Merchants and Citizens Handicap (1954); Spinaway Stakes (1954); Correction Handicap (1955); Leonard Richards Stakes (1955); Dover Stakes (1955); Saranac Handicap (1955); Betsy Ross Stakes (1956); Pageant Stakes (1956); Sapling Stakes (1957); Dixie Handicap (1960); Sussex Stakes (1961); Diamond State Stakes (1961); Buckeye Handicap (1966); Lamplighter Stakes (1966)

Racing awards
- Leading jockey in Maryland (7); Leading jockey at Delaware Park (3)

Honors
- Nick Shuk Memorial Stakes at Delaware Park

Significant horses
- Pilaster, Saratoga, Damascus, Gandharva, Aughill, Shield Bearer, Singing Beauty, Tuscany, Navy Page, Grecian Queen, Jolly Jet, Brazen Brat, Little Harp, Plion, Invigorator, Laffango, Big Mo, Sailor

Nicholas Shuk (September 30, 1930 – October 1983) was an American jockey in thoroughbred horse racing. He began his career in 1948 as a contract rider for Art Rooney, owner of the Pittsburgh Steelers football team. In the 1950s, Shuk won the Maryland jockey title seven times and was the leading jockey at Delaware Park Racetrack three times. He handled such stars as Art Rooney's Little Harp, Brazen Brat, Cida, Tuscany, and Singing Beauty. Shuk rode Laffango, one of the top two-year-olds of 1952.

Shuk rode in the Kentucky Derby, the Preakness Stakes and the Belmont Stakes with his best finish coming in the 1955 Preakness with Montpelier Stable's colt Saratoga who finished second to Nashua. He won the Monmouth Oaks in 1953 with Grecian Queen who was later chosen American Champion Three-Year-Old Filly.

Nick Shuk served as a mentor to riders such as Stewart Elliott who rode Smarty Jones to victory in the Kentucky Derby. He was considered by jockeys such as Bill Hartack to be one of the finest gate riders.

Well into his fifties, Nick Shuk remained in remarkable condition despite numerous spills and traumas on the track. At age 50, he rode 510 races and scored 47 victories. In 1983, he succumbed to cancer after winning 2,668 races in his career. He was living in Laurel, Maryland at the time of his death in 1983.

In 2001, John M. Toothman published his biography title The Reinsman: The Nick Shuk Story. (ISBN 978-1588984340)
