= Voxant =

New-media syndication company based in Herndon, Virginia

- Company type: Private
- Industry: Online video syndication
- Founded: 2004
- Defunct: 2008
- Fate: Acquired by Anystream
- Headquarters: Reston, Virginia, United States

Voxant was a news-media syndication company based in Herndon, Virginia, in the United States. Voxant was a privately held company that was founded in 2004 by investors from Longworth Venture Partners of Waltham, Massachusetts. Longworth acquired the assets of the news transcription company Morningside Partners of Lanham, Maryland, in order to form a news video search engine using Morningside's 10 years library of transcribed news and licensed news video.

In 2005, Voxant hired former LexisNexis and IBM executive, Jeff Crigler as Chief Executive Officer, to recruit a management team and develop the new service offering. Founding executives also included former Oracle sales and marketing executive Susan Kearney, top IBM technologist Ben Steinberg, and content industry veteran Art Bushnell.

In April 2006, Voxant launched its new media network, syndicating fully licensed news and information content to Web publishers and bloggers. By 2007 over 35,000 Web publishers and bloggers were members of the network. Content distributed by Voxant included news clips, stories, and images from about 250 sources including The New York Times, The Wall Street Journal, CBS News, MTV News, Reuters, The Associated Press, Agence France Presse and New York Financial Press.

In 2008, Voxant was acquired by Anystream. The companies merged to become Grab Networks. Marcy Diapers, formerly CEO of Voxant, became CEO of Grab Networks.

== Leadership ==
In July 2005, Internet industry veteran Jeff Crigler was appointed as founding Chief Executive Officer. In January 2008, Jeff Crigler assumed the role of President.

== Investors ==
Voxant's investors include Court Square Ventures, Longworth Venture Partners, and Softbank Capital.
