= Marcien Jenckes =

- Born: Wichita, Kansas
- Education: New York University (BA) University of Virginia Darden School of Business (MBA)
- Occupation(s): President of Advertising, Comcast

Marcien Jenckes is the President, Advertising for Comcast.

== Early life and education ==
Marcien Jenckes was born in Wichita, Kansas. As a child he also lived in Spain.

Jenckes holds an MBA from the University of Virginia Darden School of Business and a BA in Economics and Political Science from New York University.

== Career ==
Jenckes began his career at the Federal Reserve Bank of New York. Afterwards he worked at McKinsey & Company. In 2001, he joined AOL as Vice President, Messaging Communities and worked with the AIM and ICQ Brands and launched its portal. Then he was the president of the Content division of Grab Networks and even before that he was the Officer for Voxant, Inc, a private company based in Reston, Virginia. Voxant and Anystream merged to form Grab. Then he joined Comcast. At Comcast, Jenckes worked in Consumer Services at Cable, where he oversaw video, internet, voice and home. In 2017, Jenckes worked on Comcast’s ad division as part of a review that followed a few acquisitions. Jenckes was handed the role of president, advertising at Comcast Cable, where he is responsible for a division representing all of the company’s advertising assets, including Comcast Spotlight and Effectv.
