= Nijinsky's Secret =

American-bred Thoroughbred racehorse

- Sire: Nijinsky
- Grandsire: Southern Dancer
- Dam: Secret Beauty
- Damsire: Raise a Native
- Sex: Stallion
- Foaled: 1978
- Country: United States
- Colour: Chestnut
- Breeder: Oxford Stable
- Owner: Ralph C. Wilson (France); Mrs. John A. McDougald (NA)
- Trainer: John Cunnington, Jr. Kent Stirling (from age 4)
- Record: Won 14
- Earnings: $787,932

Major wins
- Tidal Handicap (1982); Hialeah Turf Cup Handicap (1983, 1984); Bougainvillea Handicap (1983); King Edward Gold Cup Handiacp (1983); Jockey Club Cup Handicap (1983); W. L. McKnight Handicap (1984)

Honours
- Nijinsky's Secret Handicap at Calder Race Course

Nijinsky's Secret (foaled 1978 in Kentucky) is a Thoroughbred racehorse who competed in France, Canada, and the United States.

== Background ==
Nijinsky's Secret was bred by Oxford Stable, he was a son of the 1970 English Triple Crown champion, Nijinsky.

Purchased by Ralph C. Wilson, the prominent American owner of the Buffalo Bills National Football League team, Nijinsky's Secret was sent to the training center at Chantilly Racecourse in France where he was conditioned by trainer John Cunnington, Jr.

== Racing career ==
The colt raced at age two and three in France where he was a two-time winner from eight starts.

Sold in June 1982 to Canadian business tycoon Bud McDougald, Nijinsky's Secret was brought to North America to race. According to the New York Times, during 1983 and 1984 he was the "scourge of Florida turf racing". His wins included back-to-back wins in the Hialeah Turf Cup. In addition to his wins in Florida, Nijinsky's Secret also won important stakes races at Toronto's Woodbine Racetrack.

Campaigning during the second half 1984, Nijinsky's Secret had no wins in four starts and was retired after finishing eighth in October's Rothman's International. Asked by a reporter why the horse had suddenly gone downhill after so much success, trainer Kent Stirling said he thought that once the regular groom the horse had become very attached to left the job to have her baby, the heartbroken horse seemed to have lost interest in racing.

== Stud record ==
Retired to stud after being syndicated for $2.4 million, Nijinsky's Secret's offspring met with modest success in racing.
