= Anystream =

- Type: Private
- Industry: Software
- Founded: 2000; 26 years ago
- Headquarters: Dulles, VA
- Area served: Worldwide
- Products: Anystream Agility, Anystream Velocity

Anystream is an Internet software company that specializes in streaming media encoding technology.

The company designs scalable software that automates the laborious process of encoding and transcoding media for broadcast and production environments. Anystream's Agility software has become a standard for streaming media encoding and broadcast transcoding for media companies such as BBC, Red Bee Media, BskyB, CNet, CNN, AOL, ESPN, Fox News, Foxsports.com, NFL Films and weather.com.

Anystream also creates software for production of rich media content for the Web, and is used by higher education institutions to automatically capture the classroom experience, with the professor's voice and projected visuals posted as an interactive web-based version of the lecture to university websites or course management systems. This software is in use by several universities, including Temple University, Medical College of Georgia, University of Illinois at Urbana–Champaign and MIT.

In September 2008, Anystream acquired Voxant, an online video syndication service operating in the same sector. The financial terms of the deal were not made public.

Anystream was acquired by Telestream in 2010.
