= Hialeah Turf Cup Handicap =

- Class: Discontinued stakes
- Location: Hialeah Park Race Track; Hialeah, Florida, United States
- Inaugurated: 1926
- Race type: Thoroughbred – Flat racing

Race information
- Distance: 1 3/16 miles (9.5 furlongs)
- Surface: Turf
- Track: Left-handed
- Qualification: Three-years-old & up
- Weight: Handicap
- Purse: US$200,000

The Hialeah Turf Cup Handicap is a discontinued American Thoroughbred horse race open to horses aged three and older that was run each year at Hialeah Park Race Track in Hialeah, Florida until the track closed at the end of the 2001 racing season. At the time, it was the oldest grass race in America.

The race was inaugurated as the Miami Cup Handicap ion March 13, 1926 and was open to horses age three and older. In addition to the President's gold cup, winner Boon Companion received what at the time was a very sizeable winner's purse of $24,950. From 1929 through 1952 it was run as the Miami Beach Handicap then in 1953 was renamed the Hialeah Turf Cup Handicap. The race was run on dirt until 1939 when it was permanently moved to the turf. It was a Grade 1 event in 1989 when financial difficulties saw racing at Hialeah Park suspended. On resumption in 1992, the race lost its graded stakes status.

Run in two divisions in 1944, the race was contested at different distances:

- 1 mile – 1932–1938
- 1 mile, 70 yards – 1929–1931
- 1 1/16 miles – 1926, 1939–1944
- 1 1/8 miles – 1927
- 1 3/16 miles – 1995–1999, 2001
- 1 1/4 miles – 1946
- 1 3/8 miles – 2000
- 1 1/2 miles – 1947–1994

== Records ==
Speed record:

- 2:25.40 @ 11/2 miles – El Senor (1989)

Most wins:

- 2 – Gleaming (1972, 1973)
- 2 – Nijinsky's Secret (1983, 1984)

Most wins by an owner:

- 3 – Allen E. Paulson (1987, 1998, 2001)
- 3 – Calumet Farm (1966, 1972, 1973)
- 3 – Hasty House Farm (1955, 1962, 1964)

Most wins by a jockey:

- 3 – Ángel Cordero Jr. (1972, 1973, 1979)

Most wins by a trainer:

- 3 – Harry Trotsek (1955, 1962, 1964)

== Winners ==
| Year | Winner | Age | Jockey | Trainer | Owner | Dist. (Miles) | Time |
|---|---|---|---|---|---|---|---|
| 2001 | Del Mar Show | 4 | Robbie Davis | William I. Mott | Allen E. Paulson trust | 13/16 | 1:53.06 |
| 2000 | Monkey Puzzle | 4 | René Douglas | Stephen L. DiMauro | Joseph F. Graffeo | 13/8 | 2:13.50 |
| 1999 | Federal Trial | 4 | Robbie Davis | Lou M. Goldfine | Arthur I. Appleton | 13/16 | 1:52.67 |
| 1998 | Yagli | 5 | Heberto Castillo Jr. | William I. Mott | Allen E. Paulson | 13/16 | 1:51.79 |
| 1997 | Sharp Appeal | 4 | Gary Boulanger | Martin D. Wolfson | Martin L. Cherry | 13/16 | 1:54.93 |
| 1996 | Signal Tap | 5 | John Velazquez | Flint S. Schulhofer | Centennial Farm | 13/16 | 1:53.15 |
| 1995 | Turk Passer | 5 | John Velazquez | Anthony Margotta Jr. | Michael Shanley, Leonard Leveen, Steven M. Weiss | 13/16 | 1:54.40 |
| 1994 | Awad | 4 | Eddie Maple | David G. Donk | Ryehill Farm (Jim & Eleanor Ryan) | 11/2 | 2:30.00 |
| 1993 | Spectacular Tide | 4 | René Douglas | Stanley M. Hough | Elizabeth & David Whelan | 11/2 | 2:25.60 |
| 1992 | Crystal Moment | 7 | Rick Wilson | Ronald Houghton | Longleaf Pine Farm (Shirley "Cosy" Lathrop) | 11/2 | 2:28.22 |
| 1990 | – 1991 | Race not held | | | | | |
| 1989 | El Senor | 5 | Herb McCauley | William W. Wright | Frances W. Luro | 11/2 | 2:25.40 |
| 1988 | Double Bed | 5 | Gérald Mossé | François Doumen | Ronald Reeves | 11/2 | 2:27.80 |
| 1987 | Theatrical | 5 | Pat Day | William I. Mott | Allen E. Paulson | 11/2 | 2:28.60 |
| 1986 | Sondrio | 5 | Craig Perret | Howard M. Tesher | Craig B. Singer | 11/2 | 2:27.60 |
| 1985 | Selous Scout | 4 | Robin Platts | Roger Attfield | Charles Rittenberg | 11/2 | 2:27.20 |
| 1984 | Nijinsky's Secret | 6 | José Vélez Jr. | Kent Stirling | John A. "Bud" McDougald | 11/2 | 2:26.80 |
| 1983 | Nijinsky's Secret | 5 | José Vélez Jr. | Kent Stirling | John A. "Bud" McDougald | 11/2 | 2:27.20 |
| 1982 | The Bart | 6 | Eddie Delahoussaye | John Sullivan | Franklin N. Groves | 11/2 | 2:26.00 |
| 1981 | Lobsang | 5 | Mike Venezia | Victor J. Nickerson | Walter Haefner | 11/2 | 2:27.20 |
| 1980 | John Henry | 5 | Darrel McHargue | Ron McAnally | Dotsam Stable | 11/2 | 2:29.40 |
| 1979 | Bowl Game | 5 | Ángel Cordero Jr. | John M. Gaver Jr. | Greentree Stable | 11/2 | 2:26.60 |
| 1978 | Noble Dancer | 6 | Steve Cauthen | Thomas J. Kelly | Haakon Fretheim | 11/2 | 2:28.00 |
| 1977 | Improviser | 5 | Miguel A. Rivera | John J. Weipert | Elmendorf Farm | 11/2 | 2:28.00 |
| 1976 | Legion | 6 | Earlie Fires | Gerald F. Jabalee | Ralph Chapman | 11/2 | 2:29.20 |
| 1976 | Lord Henham | 4 | Roger I. Velez | Stephen A. DiMauro | Robert E. Sangster | 11/2 | 2:28.20 |
| 1975 | Outdoors | 6 | Daryl Montoya | John W. Russell | Ogden Phipps | 11/2 | 2:27.40 |
| 1974 | Big Whippendeal | 4 | Miguel A. Rivera | Oscar Dishman | Kinsman Stable | 11/2 | 2:26.20 |
| 1973 | Gleaming | 5 | Ángel Cordero Jr. | Reggie Cornell | Calumet Farm | 11/2 | 2:27.60 |
| 1972 | Gleaming | 4 | Ángel Cordero Jr. | Reggie Cornell | Calumet Farm | 11/2 | 2:27.20 |
| 1971 | Drumtop | 5 | Chuck Baltazar | Roger Laurin | James B. Moseley | 11/2 | 2:26.80 |
| 1970 | Vent du Nord | 5 | Ron Turcotte | Al Scotti | Emanuel Mittman | 11/2 | 2:27.40 |
| 1969 | Blanquette | 5 | Sandino Hernandez | Angel Penna Sr. | Gustave Ring | 11/2 | 2:29.00 |
| 1968 | He's A Smoothie | 5 | Braulio Baeza | Warren Beasley | William R. Beasley | 11/2 | 2:32.80 |
| 1967 | War Censor | 4 | Earlie Fires | S. Bryant Ott | Fourth Estate Stable | 11/2 | 2:28.20 |
| 1966 | Kentucky Jug | 5 | William Boland | Horace A. Jones | Calumet Farm | 11/2 | 2:27.20 |
| 1965 | Hot Dust | 5 | Steve Brooks | Sidney J. Smith | Mrs. Alfred J. Giordano | 11/2 | 2:29.20 |
| 1964 | Carteret | 6 | Ray Broussard | Harry Trotsek | Hasty House Farm | 11/2 | 2:28.60 |
| 1963 | Intercepted | 4 | Robert Ussery | Joseph H. Pierce Sr. | Pin Oak Farm | 11/2 | 2:40.40 |
| 1962 | El Loco | 5 | John Sellers | Harry Trotsek | Hasty House Farm | 11/2 | 2:29.80 |
| 1961 | Wolfram | 5 | John L. Rotz | Burley Parke | Harbor View Farm | 11/2 | 2:29.60 |
| 1960 | Amerigo | 5 | Bill Hartack | Harris Brown | Lillian B. Christopher | 11/2 | 2:29.20 |
| 1959 | Tudor Era | 6 | Pete Anderson | Arnold N. Winick | Mrs. Herbert Herff | 11/2 | 2:29.80 |
| 1958 | Meeting | 5 | John Ruane | John Sceusa | Tartan Stable | 11/2 | 2:27.80 |
| 1957 | Jabneh | 5 | Bill Hartack | Phil S. Goodwin | Eugenia E. Bankhead | 11/2 | 2:31.20 |
| 1956 | Guardian | 6 | Ray Mikkonen | George M. Odom | Josephine Widener Bigelow | 11/2 | 2:29.20 |
| 1955 | Stan | 5 | John Adams | Harry Trotsek | Hasty House Farm | 11/2 | 2:29.60 |
| 1954 | Picador | 7 | Hedley Woodhouse | Preston M. Burch | Brookmeade Stable | 11/2 | 2:28.80 |
| 1953 | Royal Vale | 5 | William Boland | James E. Ryan | Esther du Pont Weir | 11/2 | 2:28.80 |
| 1952 | Pilaster | 8 | Nick Shuk | Frank A. Bonsal | Mrs. Henry L. Straus | 11/2 | 2:30.20 |
| 1951 | Going Away | 5 | Joe Culmone | Preston M. Burch | Brookmeade Stable | 11/2 | 2:31.60 |
| 1950 | Chicle II | 5 | Hedley Woodhouse | Joseph H. Pierce Sr. | Palatine Stable (Frank Rosen) | 11/2 | 2:29.00 |
| 1949 | Dinner Hour | 5 | Angel Rivera | Larry H. Thompson | Helen S. Reineman | 11/2 | 2:30.40 |
| 1948 | Stud Poker | 5 | Donald MacAndrews | Paul L. Kelley | Edward E. Voynow | 11/2 | 2:29.20 |
| 1947 | Tel O'Sullivan | 4 | James Stout | George W. Carroll | Mrs. Louis Rabinowitz | 11/2 | 2:36.00 |
| 1946 | Frere Jacques | 4 | Conn McCreary | Marion McGonigle | Jacob Sher | 11/4 | 2:04.20 |
| 1945 | No race held due to WW II restrictions | | | | | | |
| 1944-1 | Air Current | 5 | Ted Atkinson | Walter A. Kelley | Allen T. Simmons | 11/16 | 1:44.40 |
| 1944-2 | Rascal | 5 | Conn McCreary | Paul L. Kelley | V. L. Shea | 11/16 | 1:45.00 |
| 1943 | No race held due to WW II restrictions | | | | | | |
| 1942 | Sir Marlboro | 6 | Eddie Arcaro | Eddie Coates | Mrs. Joseph Eitinger | 11/16 | 1:44.80 |
| 1941 | Robert L | 7 | Eddie Arcaro | John B. Partridge | John B. Partridge | 11/16 | 1:47.40 |
| 1940 | Sandy Boot | 7 | Willie Lee Johnson | John B. Partridge | James D. Norris | 11/16 | 1:48.20 |
| 1939 | Maeriel | 6 | Joseph Renick | George E. Phillips | Maemere Farm | 11/16 | 1:46.20 |
| 1938 | Wise Prince | 6 | Carroll Bierman | Hirsch Jacobs | Felix Spatola | 1m | 1:37.00 |
| 1937 | White Cockade | 4 | Hilton Dabson | James E. Fitzsimmons | Ogden Phipps | 1m | 1:39.00 |
| 1936 | Nectarine | 4 | Joseph Renick | Bert S. Michell | Jean Denmark | 1m | 1:36.40 |
| 1935 | Larranaga | 6 | Wayne Wright | Frank J. Kearns | Anall Stable (Allan A. Ryan) | 1m | 1:37.20 |
| 1934 | Springsteel | 5 | Jimmy Burke | William Irvine | Sylvester W. Labrot | 1m | 1:38.00 |
| 1933 | Curaçao | 4 | Silvio Coucci | William Brennan | Greentree Stable | 1m | 1:38.20 |
| 1932 | Repentance | 4 | Herbert Callahan | Mose Lowenstein | Gladys M. Pulitzer | 1m | 1:36.40 |
| 1931 | Silverdale | 5 | Eddie Ambrose | John F. Schorr | Edward B. McLean | 1m,70yds | 1:45.40 |
| 1930 | Herrick | 4 | Charles Kurtsinger | James Gass | C. E. Hamilton | 1m,70yds | 1:42.20 |
| 1929 | Fly Hawk | 5 | Danny McAuliffe | A. G. "Bob" Robertson | William Maher | 1m,70yds | 1:43.60 |
| 1927 | War Eagle | 3 | Eddie Ambrose | John F. Schorr | Edward B. McLean | 11/8 | 1:51.20 |
| 1926 | Boon Companion | 4 | Vincent Stott | Al G. Woodman | Coventry Stable (S. A. Cowan) | 11/16 | 1:46.40 |
