= SproutCore =

Open-source JavaScript web framework

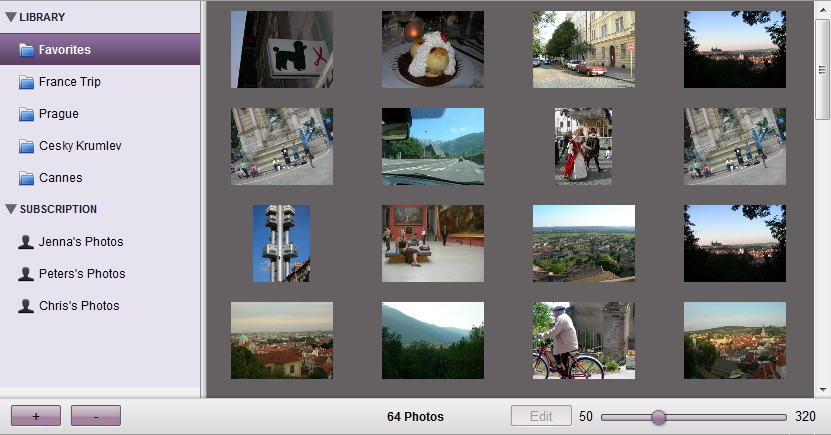
- A demo application of SproutCore
- Developer(s): Strobe Inc., Sproutit, Apple Inc. and community.
- Initial release: 2010
- Stable release: 1.11.0 / February 2, 2015; 10 years ago
- Repository: github.com/sproutcore/sproutcore
- Written in: Ruby/JavaScript
- Operating system: Cross-platform
- License: MIT License
- Website: www.sproutcore.com

SproutCore is an open-source JavaScript web framework. Its goal is to allow developers to create web applications with advanced capabilities and a user experience comparable to that of desktop applications. When developing a SproutCore application, all code is written in JavaScript. A notable fork of SproutCore is Ember.js. Both projects are maintained separately and have taken different directions.

== Development ==
SproutCore, initially created in 2007 by Sproutit as the basis for their Mailroom application, is available under the MIT License.

Apple announced MobileMe at WWDC in 2008, noting that much of it was built using SproutCore. Apple has contributed greatly to the project as part of a Web 2.0 initiative. SproutCore was also used at iWork.com, the online extension of the iWork productivity software by Apple.

The latest major stable SproutCore release is 1.8, released on March 7, 2012, with many bug fixes, several new features, and documentation updates. Release 1.6 was largely a bugfix release, building on the previous 1.5 release. SproutCore 1.5 contained significant updates to view layers, added a new CSS parser that builds off of SCSS, WAI-ARIA support, modular loading, and additional features. The previous major release, SproutCore 1.4, included touch support for mobile devices, released on September 20, 2010.

In June 2010, the creator of SproutCore, Charles Jolley, left Apple to start Strobe Inc., which provides SproutCore support and continues development.

In May 2011, the SproutCore team announced SproutCore 2.0, a rebuilt version of the framework designed to expose the MVC underpinnings without requiring developers to use the included widget set. The team also emphasized the importance of reducing file size to support developing applications for mobile devices.

In July 2011, a new project, SproutCore UI, was announced. SproutCore UI is designed to provide common user interface elements for developers targeting mobile devices.

In November 2011 Facebook acquired the Strobe team in a deal Facebook described as a talent acquisition.

SproutCore 1.x codebase would continue releasing and was under active development by the core team and SproutCore community.

Appnovation Technologies currently provides community support for SproutCore.
