= Pierre Alexandre =

French-American journalist, writer and businessman

Pierre Alexandre is a French writer, journalist and businessman. He has founded and is the CEO of New York Financial Press, a media company based in Wall Street, inside the Stock Exchange.

== Education ==
Born in 1964, Pierre Alexandre graduated from the Sciences Po Paris and from IPJ, a French journalist school.

== Career ==
Alexandre has worked with France Info, Capital, L'Express and BFM TV. He was also editor in chief of Strategies.

In 2000, he becomes the correspondent in Wall Street for TF1, a French television station, and later for LCI. He works with France24, the worldwide news channel, and Europe 1, a national French radio station.

In 2005, Alexandre created New York Financial Press (NYFP). NYFP produces on line videos with a financial content available in eight languages: French, English, Spanish, Arabic, Portuguese, Russians, Chinese and Japanese. NYFP produces videos on business news for an international audience, including live spots from Wall Street studios, analysis of the other markets and financial centers (Asia and Europe), as well as ad hoc reports on request for French and other European media outlets.

== Bibliography ==
- 2004: John F. Kerry; l’homme qui veut arrêter Bush (Editions Anne Carrière)
- 2002: Dans les coulisses de Wall Street; de l’euphorie aux larmes (Editions Fayard)
- 2000: Le retour du plein-emploi - co-written with the economist Marc Touati (Editions Anne Carrière)
- 1997: Les patrons de presse; quinze ans d’histoires secrètes de la presse écrite en France (Editions Anne Carrière)
