= Pilaster (horse) =

American-bred Thoroughbred racehorse

- Sire: Pilate
- Grandsire: Friar Rock
- Dam: Air Cooled
- Damsire: Jacopo
- Sex: Gelding
- Foaled: 1944
- Country: United States
- Color: Bay
- Breeder: Henry L. Straus
- Owner: Henry L. Straus
- Trainer: Frank A. Bonsal
- Record: 102: 29-14-20
- Earnings: US$259,800

Major wins
- Bryan and O'Hara Memorial Handicap (1948); Sagamore Stakes (1948); Grayson Stakes (1948); Exterminator Handicap (1948, 1951); Governor Bowie Handicap (1948); Riggs Handicap (1949); Pimlico Cup (1949, 1951); Prince George Autumn Handicap (1949); New York Handicap (1950); Absecon Island Handicap (1951); Miami Beach Handicap (1952)

Honors
- Laurel Race Course Hall of Fame (1967)
- Last updated on October 19, 2011

Pilaster (foaled 1944 in Maryland) was an American Thoroughbred racehorse who was inducted into the Maryland-Bred Hall of Fame in 1967. He was bred and raced by Henry L. Straus and trained by Frank Bonsal.

== Breeding ==
Pilaster was sired by Pilate, a son of the 1916 American Horse of the Year and Belmont Stakes winner Friar Rock. His dam was Air Cooled, whose sire (Jacopo) was the 1930 Champion Two-Year-Old Colt in England.

== Racing career ==
Pilaster enjoyed considerable racing success from age four through eight. On February 16, 1952, the 8-year-old gelding won the Miami Beach Handicap at Hialeah Park Race Track in Florida. He was retired at the end of the year, after winning 29 career races and earnings totalling US$259,800.
