= Adbot =

Internet advertising company in Chicago

Adbot, Inc.
- Type: Private
- Industry: Online advertising
- Founded: 1997; 29 years ago, in Chicago, Illinois
- Headquarters: 10 S Riverside Plaza, Chicago, IL
- Key people: James R. Frith (president)

Adbot, Inc. was a privately held Internet advertising company in Chicago owned and operated by James R. Frith, Jr. The company was a pioneer in the delivery of display advertising on the Internet and was extant from April 1997 to December 1997, at which time it ceased operations due to a legal disputes with the U.S. Securities and Exchange Commission.

== History ==

Adbot announced the introduction of its auction market for Internet advertising on Jan 23, 1997. On April 10, 1997, the company held its first live outcry auction, pairing a number of small publishers with interested advertisers. By mid-summer, Adbot was well on its way to selling more than 100 million placements and had completed a closed loop of ad delivery and publisher payments.

Adbot operated under this model until Dec 5, 1997. On that date, the Federal Bureau of Investigation raided Adbot's office resulting in the cessation of normal operations, as part of an investigation into securities fraud related to Frith's Chicago Partnership Board (CPB) operation, the ill-advised source of Adbot's start-up funding. Despite efforts to separate from the troubled CPB and continue operations, the company was ordered to liquidate all assets and was shuttered in December 1997. Frith eventually was found by a jury to be not guilty of securities fraud, but was convicted of two securities law violations (out of 23 charges) for operating his CPB broker-dealership without enough money in its reserve accounts. The conviction was based on a financial shortfall on a single day in 1997.

The case notably became reference case law regarding auditing requirements for securities firms.

== Auction-based model ==
As with typical advertising networks of the day, publisher sites of similar topical interest were grouped into ad networks. For the purpose of the auction model, these networks were broken into lots. Because every lot was sold at a price set by the bidders, the placement of Internet advertising units into otherwise unsold inventory was guaranteed. Impression guarantees protected bidders from under-delivery.

The auction model established the market price of display advertising based on a simple supply-demand mechanism. This was in contrast to Adbot's larger competitor, DoubleClick, where ad placement pricing was negotiated between the ad network operator and marketers. At the time, the auction model was novel in the industry, though others were to follow using the same or similar models.

== Clients ==
According to the Adbot web site the client list included advertisers such as Hotmail, Idealab's original version of Answers.com, and Expedia.com. Publishers in the client list included companies such as the Experts Exchange, Dine.com, the Weather Underground and MapBlast, which would become part of MSN's mapping product.
