= BINAC =

Early electronic computer produced in 1949

BINAC (Binary Automatic Computer) is an early electronic computer that was designed for Northrop Aircraft Company by the Eckert–Mauchly Computer Corporation (EMCC) in 1949. Eckert and Mauchly had started the design of EDVAC at the University of Pennsylvania, but chose to leave and start EMCC, the first computer company in the United States. BINAC was their first product, the first stored-program computer in the United States; BINAC is also sometimes claimed to be the world's first commercial digital computer even though it was limited in scope and never fully functional after delivery.

== Architecture ==
The BINAC was a bit-serial binary computer with two independent CPUs, each with its own 512-word acoustic mercury delay-line memory. The CPUs continuously compared results to check for errors caused by hardware failures. It used approximately 700 vacuum tubes. The 512-word acoustic mercury delay-line memories were divided into 16 channels, each holding 32 words of 31 bits, with an additional 11-bit space between words to allow for circuit delays in switching. The clock rate was 4.25 MHz (1 MHz according to one source), which yielded a word access time of about 10 microseconds. The addition time was 800 microseconds, and the multiplication time was 1200 microseconds. Programs or data were entered manually in octal using an eight-key keypad or were loaded from magnetic tape. BINAC was significant for being able to perform high-speed arithmetic on binary numbers, with no provisions to store characters or decimal digits.

== Project and plan ==
In early 1946, months after the completion of ENIAC, the University of Pennsylvania adopted a new patent policy, which would have required Eckert and Mauchly to assign all their patents to the university if they stayed beyond spring of that year. Unable to reach an agreement with the university, the duo left the Moore School of Electrical Engineering in March 1946, along with much of the senior engineering staff. Simultaneously, the duo founded the Electronic Control Company (later renamed the Eckert-Mauchly Computer Corporation) in Philadelphia, to create electronic stored-program computers on a commercial basis. Later on October 9, 1947, needing money to keep their business afloat while working on the UNIVAC I (which was also in development at the time) for the United States Census Bureau, the duo drafted a contract with Northrop Aircraft to build a new computer, which became the BINAC. The company quickly signed it and simultaneously ordered one, as they were engaged in a project to build a long-range guided missile for the U.S. Air Force, and had the idea of using electronic computers for airborne navigation.

By September 1948, the second module for the computer was complete in the newly renamed Eckert-Mauchly Computer Corporation, which included germanium diodes – the first application of semiconductors in computers – for the logic-processing hardware. As test programs were being run in early 1949, the Eckert-Mauchly Computer Corporation made an operating and maintenance manual on the computer, specifically for the Northrop Aircraft Corporation. Construction on the computer was complete in August of that year. That same month, the Eckert-Mauchly Computer Corporation issued a press release describing the sale of the BINAC, which was the first press release ever issued for the sale of an electronic computer.

== Early test programs ==
The BINAC ran a test program (consisting of 23 instructions) in March 1949, although it was not fully functional at the time. Here are early test programs that BINAC ran:

- February 7, 1949 – Ran a five-line program to fill the memory from register A.
- February 10, 1949 – Ran a five-line program to check memory.
- February 16, 1949 – Ran a six-line program to fill memory.
- March 7, 1949 – Ran 217 iterations of a 23-line program to compute squares. It was still running correctly when it stopped.
- April 4, 1949 – Ran a fifty-line program to fill memory and check all instructions. It ran for 2.5 hours before encountering an error. Shortly after that it ran for 31.5 hours without error.

== Customer acceptance ==
Northrop accepted delivery of BINAC in September 1949. Northrop employees said that BINAC never worked properly after it was delivered, although it had worked at the Eckert-Mauchly workshop. It was able to run some small programs but did not work well enough to be used as a production machine. Northrop attributed the failures to it not being properly packed for shipping when Northrop picked it up; EMCC said that the problems were due to errors in re-assembly of the machine after shipping. Northrop, citing security considerations, refused to allow EMCC technicians near the machine after shipping, instead hiring a newly graduated engineering student to re-assemble it. EMCC said that the fact that it worked at all after this was testimony to the engineering quality of the machine.

== First computer user manual ==
Previous computers were the darlings of university departments of engineering; the users knew the machines well. The BINAC was going to go to an end user, and so a user manual was needed. Automobile "users" were quite accustomed in those days to doing significant servicing of their vehicles, and "user manuals" existed to help them. The BINAC manual writers took inspiration from those manuals when writing the user manual for the BINAC.

== See also ==
- Ferranti Mark 1
- LEO (computer)
- List of vacuum-tube computers
- Short Code
- UNIVAC I
