= New York Financial Press =

American media company

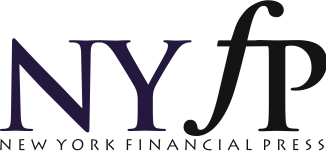
positionnement

New York Financial Press (NYFP) is a media company founded by Pierre Alexandre and based on Wall Street in New York City.

== Overview ==
New York Financial Press was founded in August 2005 by Pierre Alexandre, a former Wall Street correspondent for LCI. NYFP offers financial videos in 8 different languages (English, French, Arabic, Spanish, Portuguese, Chinese, Japanese and Russian), producing around 50 videos a day. NYFP works with the New York Stock Exchange and possesses its own studios.

== Services ==
NYFP produces daily videos on business news for an international audience, including live spots from Wall Street studios, analysis of the other markets and financial centers (Asia and Europe), as well as ad hoc reports on request for French and other European media outlets.

NYFP has closed agreements to broadcast its videos on many various websites. With Brightcove, the company is able to distribute and syndicate its programs through platforms such as Blinkx, OneCast, Clipsyndicate, CanoeTV, and Reuters.

New York Financial Press specializes in macroeconomics and financial analysis but is also able to provide reports on demand in various fields including education (pedagogical videos), culture (covering special events) or new technologies.

NYFP made its name for itself through its technical provider activities and its experience in online videos.
