= Fiksu =

Mobile marketing technology provider

- Type: Private
- Industry: Advertising, Mobile, Connected TV
- Founded: 2008; 18 years ago
- Founder: Micah Adler
- Headquarters: Boston, US
- Number of locations: San Francisco, New York City, London
- Key people: Micah Adler (president, CEO); Craig Palli (Chief Strategy Officer); Oleg Fogel (Chief Technology Officer); Ann Kuzmenko (COO); Spencer Scott (Chief Revenue Officer); Tom Caputo (Chief Product Officer)
- Number of employees: 150
- Website: fiksu.com

Fiksu is a provider of mobile marketing technology that helps app and brand marketers reach their target audiences on mobile and CTV. The company's mobile-first platform targets users through social and video networks, real-time bidding (RTB) exchanges, traditional mobile ad networks, and mobile web. Device-level data collections are from the actions mobile app users take, including launches, registrations and purchases.

== History ==
Fiksu, which means "smart" in Finnish, was founded in 2008 by Micah Adler as 'Fluent Mobile', a news-aggregating mobile app. In early 2011, faced with mounting marketing costs, Fluent developed a set of algorithmic tools for lowering the cost of mobile app user acquisition. The company pivoted its focus to become a mobile marketing technology provider, using that technology to help others market their apps and acquire loyal app users.

Fiksu reached annual revenues of more than $100 million in 2014.

Fiksu is headquartered in Boston, Massachusetts. The company also has key offices in San Francisco, California; Northampton, Massachusetts; and London.

== Indexes ==
The Fiksu Indexes were introduced in July 2011 to provide insight into industry trends related to app downloads and the costs associated with acquiring new users. They include the App Store Competitive Index, which shows data about the top 200 free iPhone apps downloaded, and the Cost Per Loyal User Index, which shows how much marketers are spending to generate each loyal app customer, as defined by the company as someone who opens the app three times. In March 2014, Fiksu introduced two new indexes that measure costs on both iOS and Android – the Cost per Install Index and the Cost per App Launch Index.

== FreeMyApps ==
Fiksu launched FreeMyApps in December 2011. The solution was originally aimed at helping developers, and marketers of paid iOS apps drive mobile app downloads. The platform, which launched an Android version in December 2012, later shifted to a model that rewarded its users with gift cards for exploring and sharing free apps. FreeMyApps had 1.6 million monthly active users in June 2015.
