= Adtile Technologies =

US motion-sensing technology company

- Type: Private
- Industry: Information Technology; Mobile; Motion-sensing technology
- Founded: August 1, 2010; 16 years ago
- Founder: Nils Forsblom
- Headquarters: San Diego
- Key people: Nils Forsblom (CEO); Annikki Laine (COO)
- Website: adtile.me

Adtile Technologies is an American company that develops and markets motion-sensing technology. The company’s headquarter is in San Diego, California. It is best known for its motion ads, which employs phone's sensors that supports motion as input to make advertisements interactive.

In October 2014, Adtile was selected to receive the 2014 North America Frost & Sullivan Award for Enabling Technology Leadership.

== History ==
Nils Forsblom, a Finnish-American technology entrepreneur founded Adtile Technologies in 2010. The company's first product was Photopoll, an application that allowed users to share photos, tell stories around those photos, and ask friends for opinions. In 2013, the company raised $2.7 million in funding from undisclosed angel investors. The funds were used to launch a new product called Adtile, which makes mobile advertisements interactive based on physical motion-inputs. In July 2014, the company announced a $4.5 million Series A funding round led by private venture capitalists. In March 2015, Adtile created Adtile VR, a technology that lets users experience virtual reality environments on smartphone's browser.

In October 2015, the company announced partnering with LG Uplus, which would use Adtile to power its entire mobile network and Wi-Fi stations. In April 2017, Adtile raised additional $2 million in funding which is an extension of the $4.5 million Series A raised back in 2014.

== Technology and applications ==
The Adtile Motion Technology employs algorithms identify motion interactions to offer dynamic visual feedback and make ads interactive. The Adtile Motion Technology taps into a smartphone’s native micro-electro-mechanical systems (MEMS) — namely the accelerometer and gyroscope.

Adtile VR creates a 3D rendering on a mobile device that moves as the user moves. Movements like tilting, pitching, rotating, or walking in any direction reflect changes on-screen allowing the user to interact with the virtual world.

The Adtile Motion Store is a cloud-based creative platform that allows designers to develop their own interactive sensor-enabled ads using Adtile-designed templates.

In November 2015, the company launched Air Pencil, a lightweight Web app that makes it possible to capture free-form motion with an iPhone. Adtile’s Air Pencil was inspired by Picasso’s electric light used in Gjon Mili’s photograph series featured in LIFE Magazine in 1949. The application allows users to capture motion in 3D, as lines, curves, and shapes.

Adtile launched Adtile 360 in May 2016. Adtile 360 allows creators to develop 360-degree videos that are viewed using a mobile device and can track movement and adjust viewpoints based on how the device is being held. The product combines outputs from three mobile sensors to control the video: the accelerometer, the gyroscope, and the magnetometer. Adtile 360 adds the ability to overlay emojis and other interactive graphic elements on the video.
