= OrangeSoda =

- Founded: 2006
- Founders: Jay Bean, Chris Finken, and Derek Miner
- Headquarters: American Fork, United States
- Parent: Deluxe Corporation
- Website: www.orangesoda.com

OrangeSoda Inc. is an Internet marketing company. They focus on creating geo-targeted search engine marketing (SEM), search engine optimization (SEO), and pay per click (PPC) campaigns. It is currently owned by Deluxe Corporation and based in Kansas City, having moved operations from Utah in 2015.

== History ==
OrangeSoda was founded in 2006 by Jay Bean, Chris Finken, and Derek Miner, using private funds, local money from investors, and a strategic partner.

Not affiliated with the orange soft drink, Bean used a domain name he had already purchased for unrelated reasons. In the first year, the company grew from 4 employees to 65. As of 2011, OrangeSoda has 175 employees, 6000 customers, and did $19 million in revenue in 2010. OrangeSoda was partnered with CityGrid Media, Yellow Pages Group (YPG), and Freedom Communications to provide social, mobile, and search services to their customers. In 2009, OrangeSoda was recognized as one of the top 100 fastest growing companies in Utah by MountainWest Capital Network. In 2010, the company was voted as the best startup venture in Utah Valley and one of the top 3 places to work by Utah Valley Business Quarterly. In 2012, OrangeSoda was acquired by Deluxe Corp. for $27.7M.

In 2015 they closed their offices in American Fork, Utah, making 60 workers redundant, and moved all business to Kansas City.
