= Daylife =

- Website type: B2B cloud media services
- Available in: English
- Founded: 2006
- Dissolved: 2016
- Owner: NewsCred
- Creators: Daylife, Inc
- Website: daylife.com
- Commercial: Yes
- Registration: Not required
- Launched: Jan 2006
- Current status: Defunct

Daylife was an online publishing company that offered cloud-based tools for web publishers, marketers, and developers. It provided digital media management tools and content feeds to publishers, brand marketers and developers. Daylife was founded in 2006, raised $15 million from several investors, including Getty Images, and was acquired in 2012 by NewsCred. The company was headquartered in downtown New York City.

== Overview ==
Daylife's products included the Daylife Publisher Suite, a range of APIs, and a set of "hosted solutions" including Smart Topics, Smart Galleries, and Smart Sections. The hosted solutions were all launched in partnership with Getty Images, which offers publishers a wide range of multimedia tools. Daylife's technology analyzed over 100,000 curated content feeds, which enabled publishers to curate and automate media for use in proprietary content.

Clients included USA Today, Bloomberg Businessweek, NPR, Mashable, Sky News, Forbes, and Thomson Reuters.

The company shut down in 2016.

== Publisher Suite ==
The Daylife Publisher Suite allowed publishers and marketers to deploy media features and apps from the cloud onto any digital channel.

== Smart Galleries ==
Smart Galleries is a suite of tools that allowed publishers to create image galleries as customizable widgets or in full-page formats. Daylife and Getty Images launched Smart Galleries in September 2009 in conjunction with their investment announcement.

== Smart Topics ==
Smart Topics were tools used by publishers to create media-rich pages on specific topics, linking to proprietary content and related media such as videos, images, links and tweets, selected by the publisher.

== Smart Sections ==
Smart Sections were tools that allowed publishers to compose and launch full content sections on verticals, featuring real-time media from proprietary and outside sources selected by the editor.

== Daylife APIs ==
Daylife's Developer APIs were a programming platform for media. The API served over 1.5 billion calls per month as of July 2011.

An example of the semantic web, Daylife analyzed a continuous stream of media content to enable dynamic news navigation by topic, country, journalist, medium, timeline, and geography.

== History ==
Daylife was founded in 2006 by Chief Executive Officer Upendra Shardanand. The company released its APIs In 2008. In 2009, Daylife was named one of the "Top 50 Tech Startups" by BusinessWeek and "Top 50 Real-Time Web Companies" by ReadWriteWeb. Daylife was funded by Balderton Capital, Arts Alliance, The New York Times, and Getty Images. Angel investors include Michael Arrington, John Borthwick, Andrew Rasiej, and Dave Winer. Jeff Jarvis is a partner at Daylife. In 2012, Daylife was acquired by NewsCred.
