= ModSquad =

Global digital engagement services company

- Company type: Private
- Industry: Business Process Outsourcing
- Founded: 2007; 18 years ago
- Headquarters: Sacramento, California, United States
- Area served: Global
- Key people: Amy Pritchard (CEO); Mike Pinkerton (COO)
- Products: Digital engagement strategy Customer support Content moderation Social media Community management Crisis management
- Number of employees: c. 10,000
- Website: modsquad.com

ModSquad is a digital company offering engagement services with its headquarters in the United States. Presently, the company maintains a network of over 10,000 moderators. ModSquad specializes in managed, on-demand customer service, content moderation, social media, and community management services, providing teams across various online platforms, e-commerce sites, in-game environments, mobile applications, and social media channels.

== History ==
The company was established in 2007 by attorney Amy Pritchard with the aim of offering brands a means to provide their online community members with a more personalized and relevant experience. Viewing the potential advancement in managing online communities for contemporary brands similar to the London Mods youth culture, Pritchard, alongside COO Mike Pinkerton, developed a services-based company focused on remote community managers and moderators (Mods) to staff virtual sites. The firm initially focused on providing avatar staffing services but quickly expanded its offerings to include forum moderation and customer service for various brands. By 2010, the company had amassed a team of 500 experienced Mods working on over 100 clients' sites. In 2015, ModSquad received a Silver Stevie Award in the Company of the Year (Internet/New Media) category at the 13th Annual American Business Awards. In the same year, the company was acknowledged as Customer Service Team of the Year at the Golden Bridge Awards.

== Present ==
As of the present, the company operates with a network of over 10,000 moderators, referred to as "Mods." It has established a 24/7 operations center in Sacramento, California, which was established in 2010. Additionally, the company operates 24/7 operations centers in Austin, Texas, and Derry, Northern Ireland. It also maintains offices in Brooklyn, New York, and London. In November 2015, the company, previously known as Metaverse Mod Squad, rebranded itself as ModSquad. Its client portfolio includes Warner Bros. (including Gossip Girl and Harry Potter), HarperCollins, Cartoon Network, Nickelodeon, the National Football League, Reel FX (parent firm of Webosaurs), Electronic Arts, enVie Interactive, Kimpton Hotels, Vimeo, and the United States Department of State.

== Operations ==
The company operates by delivering services through its network of over 10,000 multilingual Mods from 70 countries via a series of outsourced provision contracts. These Mods, who undergo vetting and orientation processes, adhere to predefined customer service guidelines. They assist or substitute in-house teams by overseeing various online community activities and specializing in digital engagement, including customer service, maintenance tickets, social and forum moderation, and quality assurance. Mods play a crucial role in maintaining and shaping clients' distinctive online communities. They assist with community events, provide support to users encountering technical and social issues, orient new members, and relay community concerns and feedback to corporate clients.

Mods engage in both active and passive roles within forums. In an active capacity, they serve as representatives of the corporate client, providing various services. In active mode, Mods monitor social media and conduct quality assurance testing to assess the end user experience. In their active role, Mods moderate content, engage in customer chats, oversee community management, ensure child safety (endorsed by Safe Kids USA), monitor gaming experiences, offer customer support, identify and report bugs, and manage social media accounts. Mods utilize a range of Customer Relations Management systems, allowing them to work from any location with secure internet access. This setup enables them to offer services in over 50 languages and dialects during peak traffic and activity hours, ensuring native-language support to users.
