= Short Code (computer language) =

Early higher-level language for electronic computers

- Developer: William F Schmitt, A. B. Tonik, J. R. Logan
- First appeared: 1950

Influenced by
- ENIAC Short Code

Influenced
- Intermediate programming language, OMNIBAC Symbolic Assembler

Short Code was one of the first higher-level languages developed for an electronic computer. Unlike machine code, Short Code statements represented mathematic expressions rather than a machine instruction. Also known as automatic programming, the source code was not compiled but executed through an interpreter to simplify the programming process. The execution time was, naturally, much slower.

== History ==
Short Code was proposed by John Mauchly in 1949 and originally known as Brief Code. William Schmitt implemented a version of Brief Code in 1949 for the BINAC computer, though it was never debugged and tested. The following year Schmitt implemented a new version of Brief Code for the UNIVAC I, where it was now known as Short Code (also Short Order Code). A revised version of Short Code was developed in 1952 for the Univac II by A. B. Tonik and J. R. Logan.

While Short Code represented expressions, the representation itself was not direct and required a process of manual conversion. Elements of an expression were represented by two-character codes and then divided into 6-code groups in order to conform to the 12-byte words used by BINAC and Univac computers. For example, the expression

 a = (b + c) / b * c

was converted to Short Code by a sequence of substitutions and a final regrouping:

 X3 =  (  X1 +  Y1 )  /  X1 * Y1   substitute variables
 X3 03 09 X1 07 Y1 02 04 X1   Y1   substitute operators and parentheses. 
                                   Note that multiplication is
                                   represented by juxtaposition.

 07Y10204X1Y1                      group into 12-byte words.
 0000X30309X1

Along with basic arithmetic, Short Code allowed for branching and calls to a library of functions. The language was interpreted and ran about 50 times slower than machine code.

== See also ==
- History of programming languages
- Algorithm
