= 4INFO =

American advertising corporation

4INFO Inc.

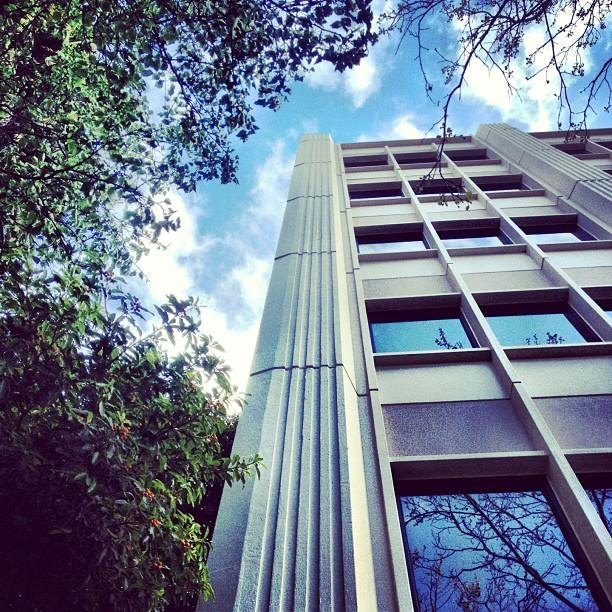
- 4INFO Headquarters
- Type: Subsidiary
- Industry: Targeted advertising Big data
- Founded: September 8, 2004; 22 years ago in Palo Alto, California, United States
- Founder: Pankaj Shah, Zaw Thet
- Headquarters: San Jose, California
- Area served: United States, Latin America and Mexico
- Key people: Tim Jenkins (CEO)
- Revenue: ▲US$28,000,000 (2014)
- Number of employees: 45
- Parent: Nielsen Holdings
- Website: 4info.com

4INFO Inc. is an American targeted advertising corporation. The company was owned by Nielsen Holdings. It was acquired by Cadent in 2020.

== History ==
4Info was founded in 2004 by Pankaj Shah and Zaw Thet. It originally focused on text-based SMS advertising, SMS publishing and mobile search.

In 2008, the company was estimated to be the largest provider of business-to-consumer SMS content in North America by Nielsen Holdings, claiming to send 80 million text messages a month in early 2009 and 200 million text messages a month in early 2010. Nielsen rated 4Info the fourth largest SMS U.S. Network. In 2010, the company was the largest provider of free text message alerts and information in the United States., and the largest American SMS Network.

The company began providing mobile display advertising in 2010, based on connecting American households to IP addresses. In 2010, 4Info acquired Butter, a company which created ad campaigns for the iPhone and Android platform.

The company is headquartered in San Jose, California with other offices in the United States. As of 2015, it employed 45 people. In 2015, the company was included on the Inc. 5000 list of America's fastest-growing private companies. In May 2015, MBlox, an independent SMS provider, acquired 4Info's SMS business line.

In March 2016, 4Info and Crossix formed a strategic alliance for targeted advertising of pharmaceutical products in the United States.

== Software and services ==
The company purchases anonymous data from internet service providers, mobile network operators, and other information aggregate sources, then uses marketing mix modeling to send targeted advertisements from their clients. The company then cross references with CPG data to look at actual purchases made by those who viewed ads.

In 2014, the company added multiscreen functionality that identifies PC and laptop activity, enabling cross-device targeted advertising, retargeting and multichannel retailing. The company also offered geotargeting and geofencing. In August 2014, the company was awarded a patent for "Systems and methods for statistically associating mobile devices to households" claiming they can link 95% of mobile users to their IP address and other devices.

The company has provided advertising data to companies such as AOL, Acxiom, Catalist, Datalogix, and Experian.
