= Site retargeting =

Site retargeting is a display advertising technique used by marketers to display advertising to people who have previously visited their website. The marketer includes a pixel within their webpage which sets a cookie in the user's browser. That cookie allows the marketer to target the website visitor with advertising elsewhere on the internet using retargeting.

A related technique used by retailers involves dynamic creative, which allows the marketer to customize the ad displayed to any site visitor, for example displaying a picture of a product the visitor was viewing earlier, but did not purchase.

Site retargeting is now commonly considered a "standard practice" among digital marketers.

== Social Media & Site Retargeting ==
The ability to "retarget", or sell ads on different websites to visitors of certain webpages, lays at the heart of most social networks business models. LinkedIn, Facebook, Twitter, Pinterest & more all allow and have detailed guides on how to run retargeting ads on their platforms. Google's business model is also built on retargeting - both in their search engine and in their display advertising network.

== Personalization ==
Another common use of site retargeting has been to deliver personalised content to users. A common idea in marketing is the "buyer persona", where marketers create fictional characters of potential customers and think about the "customer journey" - the process that each fictional customer needs to make until it decides to buy the product. Site retargeting makes it easier to keep track of where each user is on their customer journey - and thus personalize the content that is shown to the user accordingly.

== See also ==
- Behavioral retargeting
- Personalization
- Dynamic creative
- Email retargeting
- Personalized marketing
- Search retargeting
- Web beacon
