= Targeted advertising =

Form of advertising

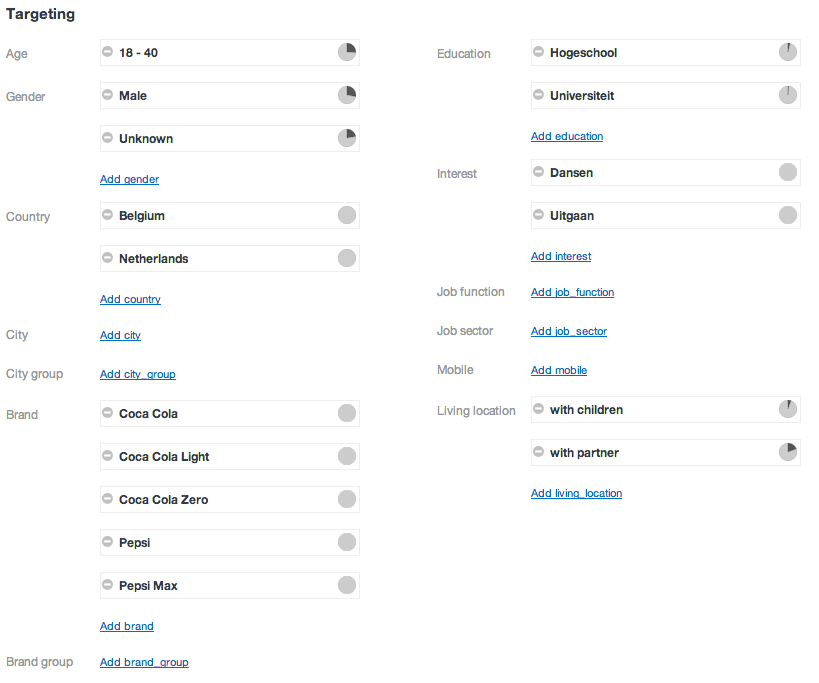
Example of targeting in an online ad system

Targeted advertising or data-driven marketing is a form of advertising, including online advertising, that is directed towards an audience with certain traits, based on the product or person the advertiser is promoting.

These traits can either be demographic with a focus on race, economic status, sex, age, generation, level of education, income level, and employment, or psychographic focused on the consumer values, personality, attitude, opinion, lifestyle, and interests. This focus can also entail behavioral variables, such as browser history, purchase history, and other recent online activities. While efficient for advertisers, the practice has raised concerns regarding privacy and algorithmic bias, which critics argue can lead to unintended discrimination or the marginalization of specific groups.

Traditional forms of advertising, including billboards, newspapers, magazines, and radio channels, are progressively becoming replaced by online advertisements.

Through the emergence of new online channels, the usefulness of targeted advertising is increasing because companies aim to minimize wasted advertising. Most targeted new media advertising currently uses second-order proxies for targets, such as tracking online or mobile web activities of consumers, associating historical web page consumer demographics with new consumer web page access, using a search word as the basis of implied interest, or contextual advertising.

== Types ==
Companies have technology that allows them to gather information about web users. By tracking and monitoring what websites users visit, internet service providers can directly show ads that are relative to the consumer's preferences. Most of today's websites are using these targeting technologies to track users' internet behavior and there is much debate over the privacy issues present.

=== Search engine marketing ===
Search engine marketing uses search engines to reach target audiences. For example, Google's Remarketing Campaigns are a type of targeted marketing where advertisers use the IP addresses of computers that have visited their websites to remarket their ad specifically to users who have previously been on their website whilst they browse websites that are a part of the Google display network, or when searching for keywords related to a product or service on the Google search engine. Dynamic remarketing can improve targeted advertising as the ads can include the products or services that the consumers have previously viewed on the advertisers' websites within the ads.

Google Ads includes different platforms. The Search Network displays the ads on 'Google Search, other Google sites such as Maps and Shopping, and hundreds of non-Google search partner websites that show ads matched to search results'. 'The Display Network includes a collection of Google websites (like Google Finance, Gmail, Blogger, and YouTube), partner sites, and mobile sites and apps that show adverts from Google Ads matched to the content on a given page.'

These two kinds of advertising networks can be beneficial for each specific goal of the company, or type of company. For example, the search network can benefit a company to reach consumers actively searching for a particular product or service.

Other ways advertising campaigns can target the user is to use browser history and search history. For example, if the user types promotional pens into a search engine such as Google, ads for promotional pens will appear at the top of the page above the organic listings. These ads will be geo-targeted to the area of the user's IP address, showing the product or service in the local area or surrounding regions. The higher ad position is often rewarded to the ad having a higher quality score. The ad quality is affected by the 5 components of the quality score:

- The ad's expected click-through rate
- The quality of the landing page
- The ad/search relevance
- Geographic performance
- The targeted devices

When ranked based on these criteria, it will affect the advertiser by improving ad auction eligibility, the actual cost per click (CPC), ad position, and ad position bid estimates; to summarise, the better the quality score, the better ad position, and lower costs.

Google uses its display network to track what users are looking at and to gather information about them. When a user goes to a website that uses the Google display network, it will send a cookie to Google, showing information on the user, what they have searched, where they are from, found by the IP address, and then builds a profile around them, allowing Google to easily target ads to the user more specifically.

For example, if a user goes onto promotional companies' websites often, that sell promotional pens, Google will gather data from the user such as age, gender, location, and other demographic information as well as information on the websites visited, the user will then be put into a category of promotional products, allowing Google to easily display ads on websites the user visits relating to promotional products.

=== Social media targeting ===
Social media targeting is a form of targeted advertising, that uses general targeting attributes such as geotargeting, behavioral targeting, and socio-psychographic targeting, and gathers the information that consumers have provided on each social media platform.

According to the media users' view history, customers who are interested in the criteria will be automatically targeted by the advertisements of certain products or services. For example, Facebook collects massive amounts of user data from surveillance infrastructure on its platforms. Information such as a user's likes, view history, and geographic location is leveraged to micro-target consumers with personalized products.

Paid advertising on Facebook works by helping businesses to reach potential customers by creating targeted campaigns.

Social media also creates profiles of the consumer and only needs to look at one place, the user's profile, to find all interests and 'likes'.

E.g. Facebook lets advertisers target using broad characteristics like gender, age, and location. Furthermore, they allow more narrow targeting based on demographics, behavior, and interests (see a comprehensive list of Facebook's different types of targeting options).

=== Television ===
Advertisements can be targeted to specific consumers watching digital cable, Smart TVs, or over-the-top video. Targeting can be done according to age, gender, location, or personal interests in films, etc.

Cable box addresses can be cross-referenced with information from data brokers like Acxiom, Equifax, and Experian, including information about marriage, education, criminal record, and credit history. Political campaigns may also match against public records such as party affiliation and which elections and party primaries the view has voted in.

=== Mobile devices ===
Since the early 2000s, advertising has been pervasive online and more recently in the mobile setting. Targeted advertising based on mobile devices allows more information about the consumer to be transmitted, not just their interests, but their information about their location and time. This allows advertisers to produce advertisements that could cater to their schedule and a more specific changing environment.

=== Content and contextual targeting ===
The most straightforward method of targeting is content/contextual targeting. This is when advertisers put ads in a specific place, based on the relative content present. Another name used is content-oriented advertising, as it corresponds to the context being consumed.

This targeting method can be used across different mediums, for example in an article online, purchasing homes would have an advert associated with this context, like an insurance ad. This is usually achieved through an ad matching system that analyses the contents on a page or finds keywords and presents a relevant advert, sometimes through pop-ups.

Sometimes the ad matching system can fail, as it can neglect to tell the difference between positive and negative correlations. This can result in placing contradictory adverts, which are not appropriate to the content.

=== Technical targeting ===
Technical targeting is associated with the user's own software or hardware status. The advertisement is altered depending on the user's available network bandwidth, for example, if a user is on a mobile phone that has a limited connection, the ad delivery system will display a version of the ad that is smaller for a faster data transfer rate.

Addressable advertising systems serve ads directly based on demographic, psychographic, or behavioral attributes associated with the consumer(s) exposed to the ad. These systems are always digital and must be addressable in that the endpoint that serves the ad (set-top box, website, or digital sign) must be capable of rendering an ad independently of any other endpoints based on consumer attributes specific to that endpoint at the time the ad is served.

Addressable advertising systems, therefore, must use consumer traits associated with the endpoints as the basis for selecting and serving ads.

=== Time Targeting ===
According to the Journal of Marketing, more than 1.8 billion clients spent a minimum of 118 minutes daily- via web-based networking media in 2016. Nearly 77% of these clients interact with the content through likes, commenting, and clicking on links related to content. With this astounding buyer trend, advertisers need to choose the right time to schedule content, to maximize advertising efficiency.

To determine what time of day is most effective for scheduling content, it is essential to know when the brain is most effective at retaining memory. Research in chronopsychology has credited that time-of-day impacts diurnal variety in a person's working memory accessibility and has discovered the enactment of inhibitory procedures to build working memory effectiveness during times of low working memory accessibility. Working memory is known to be vital for language perception, learning, and reasoning providing us with the capacity of putting away, recovering, and preparing quick data.

For many people, working memory accessibility is good when they get up toward the beginning of the day, most reduced in mid-evening, and moderate at night.

=== Sociodemographic targeting ===
Sociodemographic targeting focuses on the characteristics of consumers. This includes their age, generation, gender, salary, and nationality. The idea is to target users specifically and to use this collected data, for example, targeting a male in the age bracket of 18–24. Facebook and other social media platforms use this form of targeting by showing advertisements relevant to the user's demographic on their account, this can show up in the forms of banner ads, mobile ads, or commercial videos.

=== Geographical and location-based targeting ===
This type of advertising involves targeting different users based on their geographic location. IP addresses can signal the location of a user and can usually transfer the location through ZIP codes. Locations are then stored for users in static profiles, thus advertisers can easily target these individuals based on their geographic location.

A location-based service (LBS) is a mobile information service that allows spatial and temporal data transmission and can be used to an advertiser's advantage. This data can be harnessed from applications on the device (mobile apps like Uber) that allow access to the location information.

This type of targeted advertising focuses on localizing content, for example, a user could be prompted with options of activities in the area, for example, places to eat, nearby shops, etc. Although producing advertising off consumer location-based services can improve the effectiveness of delivering ads, it can raise issues with the user's privacy.

=== Behavioral targeting ===
Behavioral targeting is centered around the activity/actions of users and is more easily achieved on web pages. Information from browsing websites can be collected from data mining, which finds patterns in users' search history. Advertisers using this method believe it produces ads that will be more relevant to users, thus leading consumers to be more likely influenced by them.

If a consumer was frequently searching for plane ticket prices, the targeting system would recognize this and start showing related adverts across unrelated websites, such as airfare deals on Facebook. Its advantage is that it can target individual interests, rather than target groups of people whose interests may vary.

When a consumer visits a website, the pages they visit, the amount of time they view each page, the links they click on, the searches they make, and the things that they interact with, allow sites to collect that data, and other factors, to create a 'profile' that links to that visitor's web browser. As a result, site publishers can use this data to create defined audience segments based on visitors who have similar profiles.

When visitors return to a specific site or a network of sites using the same web browser, those profiles can be used to allow marketers and advertisers to position their online ads and messaging in front of those visitors who exhibit a greater level of interest and intent for the products and services being offered.

Behavioral targeting has emerged as one of the main technologies used to increase the efficiency and profits of digital marketing and advertisements, as media providers can provide individual users with highly relevant advertisements. On the theory that properly targeted ads and messaging will fetch more consumer interest, publishers can charge a premium for behaviorally targeted ads and marketers can achieve.

Behavioral marketing can be used on its own or in conjunction with other forms of targeting. Many practitioners also refer to this process as "audience targeting".

While behavioral targeting can enhance ad effectiveness, it also raises privacy concerns. Users may feel uncomfortable with the idea of their online behavior being tracked and used for advertising purposes. Striking a balance between personalization and privacy is crucial.

==== Onsite ====
Behavioral targeting may also be applied to any online property on the premise that it either improves the visitor experience or benefits the online property, typically through increased conversion rates or increased spending levels. The early adopters of this technology/philosophy were editorial sites such as HotWired, online advertising with leading online ad servers, retail or another e-commerce website as a technique for increasing the relevance of product offers and promotions on a visitor by visitor basis. More recently, companies outside this traditional e-commerce marketplace have started to experiment with these emerging technologies.

The typical approach to this starts by using web analytics or behavioral analytics to breakdown the range of all visitors into several discrete channels. Each channel is then analyzed and a virtual profile is created to deal with each channel.

These profiles can be based around Personas that gives the website operators a starting point in terms of deciding what content, navigation, and layout to show to each of the different personas. When it comes to the practical problem of successfully delivering the profiles correctly this is usually achieved by either using a specialist content behavioral platform or by bespoke software development.

Most platforms identify visitors by assigning a unique ID cookie to every visitor to the site thereby allowing them to be tracked throughout their web journey, the platform then makes a rules-based decision about what content to serve.

Self-learning onsite behavioral targeting systems will monitor visitor response to site content and learn what is most likely to generate a desired conversion event. Some good content for each behavioral trait or pattern is often established using numerous simultaneous multivariate tests. Onsite behavioral targeting requires a relatively high level of traffic before statistical confidence levels can be reached regarding the probability of a particular offer generating a conversion from a user with a set behavioral profile. Some providers have been able to do so by leveraging their large user base, such as Yahoo!. Some providers use a rules-based approach, allowing administrators to set the content and offers shown to those with particular traits.

According to research behavioral targeting provides little benefit at a huge privacy cost — when targeting for gender, the targeted guess is 42% accurate, which is less than a random guess. When targeting for gender and age the accuracy is 24%.

==== Network ====
Advertising networks use behavioral targeting in a different way than individual sites. Since they serve many advertisements across many different sites, they can build up a picture of the likely demographic makeup of internet users. Data from a visit to one website can be sent to many different companies, including Microsoft and Google subsidiaries, Facebook, Yahoo, many traffic-logging sites, and smaller ad firms.

This data can sometimes be sent to more than 100 websites and shared with business partners, advertisers, and other third parties for business purposes. The data is collected using cookies, web beacons and similar technologies, and/or a third-party ad serving software, to automatically collect information about site users and site activity. Some servers even record the page that referred the user to them, the websites visited by the user after them, ads seen by the user, and ads being clicked on.

Online advertising uses cookies, a tool used specifically to identify users, as a means of delivering targeted advertising by monitoring the actions of a user on the website. For this purpose, the cookies used are called tracking cookies. An ad network company such as Google uses cookies to deliver advertisements adjusted to the interests of the user, control the number of times that the user sees an ad, and "measure" whether they are advertising the specific product to the customer's preferences.

This data is collected without attaching the people's names, addresses, email addresses, or telephone numbers, but it may include device identifying information such as the IP address, MAC address, web browser information, cookie, or other device-specific unique alphanumerical ID of the user's computer, but some stores may create guest IDs to go along with the data.

Cookies are used to control displayed ads and to track browsing activity and usage patterns on sites. This data is used by companies to infer people's age, gender, and possible purchase interests so that they can make customized ads that people would be more likely to click on.

An example would be a user seen on football sites, business sites, and male fashion sites. A reasonable guess would be to assume the user is male. Demographic analyses of individual sites provided either internally (user surveys) or externally (Comscore/Netratings) allow the networks to sell audiences rather than sites. Although advertising networks were used to sell this product, this was based on picking the sites where the audiences were. Behavioral targeting allows them to be slightly more specific about this.

== Research on targeted advertising ==
In the work titled An Economic Analysis of Online Advertising Using Behavioral Targeting, Chen and Stallaert (2014) study the economic implications when an online publisher engages in behavioral targeting. They consider that the publisher auctions off an advertising slot and are paid on a cost-per-click basis. Chen and Stallaert (2014) identify the factors that affect the publisher's revenue, the advertisers' payoffs, and social welfare. They show that revenue for the online publisher in some circumstances can double when behavioral targeting is used.

Increased revenue for the publisher is not guaranteed: in some cases, the prices of advertising and hence the publisher's revenue can be lower, depending on the degree of competition and the advertisers' valuations. They identify two effects associated with behavioral targeting: a competitive effect and a propensity effect. The relative strength of the two effects determines whether the publisher's revenue is positively or negatively affected. Chen and Stallaert (2014) also demonstrate that, although social welfare is increased and small advertisers are better off under behavioral targeting, the dominant advertiser might be worse off and reluctant to switch from traditional advertising.

In 2006, BlueLithium (now Yahoo! Advertising) in a large online study, examined the effects of behavior-targeted advertisements based on contextual content. The study used 400 million "impressions", or advertisements conveyed across behavioral and contextual borders. Specifically, nine behavioral categories (such as "shoppers" or "travelers") with over 10 million "impressions" were observed for patterns across the content.

All measures for the study were taken in terms of click-through rates (CTR) and "action-through rates" (ATR), or conversions. So, for every impression that someone gets, the number of times they "click-through" to it will contribute to CTR data, and every time they go through with or convert on the advertisement the user adds "action-through" data.

Results from the study show that advertisers looking for traffic on their advertisements should focus on behavioral targeting in context. Likewise, if they are looking for conversions on the advertisements, behavioral targeting out of context is the most effective process. The data helped determine an "across-the-board rule of thumb"; however, results fluctuated widely by content categories. Overall results from the researchers indicate that the effectiveness of behavioral targeting is dependent on the goals of the advertiser and the primary target market the advertiser is trying to reach.

== Process ==
Through the use of analytic tools, marketers attempt to understand customer behavior and make informed decisions based on the data. E-commerce retailers use data driven marketing to try and improve customer experience and increase sales. One example cited in the Harvard Business Review is Vineyard Vines, a fashion brand with brick-and-mortar stores and an online product catalog. The company has used an artificial intelligence (AI) platform to gain knowledge about its customers from actions taken or not taken on the e-commerce site. Email or social media communications are automatically triggered at certain points, such as cart abandonment. This information is also used to refine search engine marketing.

Advertising provides advertisers with a direct line of communication with existing and prospective consumers. By using a combination of words and/or pictures the general aim of the advertisement is to act as a "medium of information" (David Ogilvy) making the means of delivery and to whom the information is delivered most important. Advertising should define how and when structural elements of advertisements influence receivers, knowing that all receivers are not the same and thus may not respond in a single, similar manner.

Targeted advertising serves the purpose of placing particular advertisements before specific groups to reach consumers who would be interested in the information. Advertisers aim to reach consumers as efficiently as possible with the belief that it will result in a more effective campaign. By targeting, advertisers can identify when and where the ad should be positioned to achieve maximum profits. This requires an understanding of how customers' minds work (see also neuromarketing) to determine the best channel by which to communicate.

Types of targeting include, but are not limited to advertising based on demographics, psychographics, behavioral variables, and contextual targeting.

Behavioral advertising is the most common form of targeting used online. Internet cookies are sent back and forth between an internet server and the browser, which allows a user to be identified or to track their progressions. Cookies provide details on what pages a consumer visits, the amount of time spent viewing each page, the links clicked on; and searches and interactions made.

From this information, the cookie issuer gathers an understanding of the user's browsing tendencies and interests generating a profile. By analyzing the profile, advertisers can create defined audience segments based upon users with similar returned information, hence profiles. Tailored advertising is then placed in front of the consumer based on what organizations working on behalf of the advertisers assume are the interests of the consumer.

These advertisements have been formatted to appear on pages and in front of users that they would most likely appeal to based on their profiles. For example, under behavioral targeting, if a user is known to have recently visited several automotive shopping and comparison sites based on the data recorded by cookies stored on the user's computer, the user can then be served automotive-related advertisements when visiting other sites.

Behavioral advertising is reliant on data both wittingly and unwittingly provided by users and is made up of two different forms: one involving the delivery of advertising based on an assessment of user's web movements; the second involving the examination of communication and information as it passes through the gateways of internet service providers.

Demographic targeting was the first and most basic form of targeting used online. involves segmenting an audience into more specific groups using parameters such as gender, age, ethnicity, annual income, parental status, etc. All members of the group share a common trait.

So, when an advertiser wishes to run a campaign aimed at a specific group of people then that campaign is intended only for the group that contains those traits at which the campaign is targeted. Having finalized the advertiser's demographic target, a website or a website section is chosen as a medium because a large proportion of the targeted audience utilizes that form of media.

Segmentation using psychographics Is based on an individual's personality, values, interests, and lifestyles. A recent study concerning what forms of media people use- conducted by the Entertainment Technology Center at the University of Southern California, the Hallmark Channel, and E-Poll Market Research- concludes that a better predictor of media usage is the user's lifestyle.

Researchers concluded that while cohorts of these groups may have similar demographic profiles, they may have different attitudes and media usage habits. Psychographics can provide further insight by distinguishing an audience into specific groups by using their traits. Once acknowledging this is the case, advertisers can begin to target customers having recognized that factors other than age for example provide greater insight into the customer.

Contextual advertising is a strategy to place advertisements on media vehicles, such as specific websites or print magazines, whose themes are relevant to the promoted products. Advertisers apply this strategy to narrow-target their audiences. Advertisements are selected and served by automated systems based on the identity of the user and the displayed content of the media. The advertisements will be displayed across the user's different platforms and are chosen based on searches for keywords; appearing as either a web page or pop-up ads. It is a form of targeted advertising in which the content of an ad is in direct correlation to the content of the webpage the user is viewing.

=== Retargeting ===
Retargeting is where advertisers use behavioral targeting to produce ads that follow users after users have looked at or purchased a particular item. An example of this is store catalogs, where stores subscribe customers to their email system after a purchase hoping that they draw attention to more items for continuous purchases.

A more contemporary example of retargeting consists of ads that follow users across the web, showing them the same items that they have previously looked at with the hope that they will reconsider the product or service and purchase it. Retargeting is a very effective process; by analyzing consumers activities with the brand they can address their consumers' behavior appropriately.

== The major psychographic segments ==
=== Personality ===
Every brand, service, or product has itself a personality, how it is viewed by the public and the community and marketers will create these personalities to match the personality traits of their target market. Marketers and advertisers create these personalities because when consumers can relate to the characteristics of a brand, service, or product they are more likely to feel connected to the product and purchase it.

=== Lifestyle ===
Advertisers are aware that different people lead different lives, have different lifestyles and different wants, and needs at different times in their consumer's lives, thus individual differences can be compensated for Advertisers who base their segmentation on psychographic characteristics promote their product as the solution to these wants and needs. Segmentation by lifestyle considers where the consumer is in their life cycle and which preferences are associated with that life stage.

=== Opinions, attitudes, interests, and hobbies ===
Psychographic segmentation also includes opinions on religion, gender, politics, sporting and recreational activities, views on the environment, and arts and cultural issues. The views that the market segments hold and the activities they participate in will have an impact on the products and services they purchase and it will affect how they respond to the message.

Alternatives to behavioral advertising include audience targeting, contextual targeting, and psychographic targeting.

== Effectiveness ==
Targeting aims to improve the effectiveness of advertising and reduce the wastage created by sending advertising to consumers who are unlikely to purchase that product. Targeted advertising or improved targeting may lead to lower advertising costs and expenditures.

The effects of advertising on society and those targeted are all implicitly underpinned by the consideration of whether advertising compromises autonomous choice.

Those arguing for the ethical acceptability of advertising claim that, because of the commercially competitive context of advertising, the consumer has a choice over what to accept and what to reject.

Humans have the cognitive competence and are equipped with the necessary faculties to decide whether to be affected by adverts. Those arguing against note, for example, that advertising can make us buy things we do not want or that, as advertising is enmeshed in a capitalist system, it only presents choices based on consumerist-centered reality thus limiting the exposure to non-materialist lifestyles.

Although the effects of target advertising are mainly focused on those targeted, it can also affect those outside of the target segment. Its unintended audiences often view an advertisement targeted at other groups and start forming judgments and decisions regarding the advertisement and even the brand and company behind the advertisement, these judgments may affect future consumer behavior.

The Network Advertising Initiative conducted a study in 2009 measuring the pricing and effectiveness of targeted advertising. It revealed that targeted advertising:

- Secured an average of 2.7 times as much revenue per ad as non-targeted "run of network" advertising.
- Twice as effective at converting users who click on the ads into buyers

However, other studies show that targeted advertising, at least by gender, is not effective.

One of the major difficulties in measuring the economic efficiency of targeting, however, is being able to observe what would have happened in the absence of targeting since the users targeted by advertisers are more likely to convert than the general population. Farahat and Bailey exploit a large-scale natural experiment on Yahoo! allowing them to measure the true economic impact of targeted advertising on brand searches and clicks. They find, assuming the cost per 1000 ad impressions (CPM) is $1, that:

- The marginal cost of a brand-related search resulting from ads is $15.65 per search but is only $1.69 per search from a targeted campaign.
- The marginal cost of a click is 72 cents, but only 16 cents from a targeted campaign.
- The variation in CTR lifts from targeted advertising campaigns is mostly determined by pre-existing brand interest.

Research shows that Content marketing in 2015 generated 3 times as many leads as traditional outbound marketing, but costs 62% less showing how being able to advertise to targeted consumers is becoming the ideal way to advertise to the public. Other stats show that 86% of people skip television adverts and 44% of people ignore direct mail, which also displays how advertising to the wrong group of people can be a waste of resources.

== Benefits and disadvantages ==
=== Benefits ===
Proponents of targeted advertising argue that there are advantages for both consumers and advertisers:

==== Consumers ====
Targeted advertising benefits consumers because advertisers can effectively attract consumers by using their purchasing and browsing habits. This enables ads to be more apparent and useful for customers. Having ads that are related to the interests of the consumers allows the message to be received in a directly through effective touchpoints. An example of how targeted advertising is beneficial to consumers is that if someone sees an ad targeted to them for something similar to an item they have previously viewed online and were interested in, they are more likely to buy it.

Consumers can benefit from targeted advertising in the following ways:

- More effective delivery of desired product or service directly to the consumer: Having assumed the traits or interests of the consumer from their targeting, advertisements that will appeal to engage the customer are used.
- More direct delivery of a message that relates to the consumer's interest: Advertisements are comfortably delivered to the customer, whether it be jargon or a certain medium, the delivery of the message is part of the consumer's 'lifestyle'
- More compatible advertisement content with the consumer's preferences and values. This is especially true in conservative societies, which may have reservations about the content they view online.

==== Intelligence agencies ====
Intelligence agencies worldwide can more easily, and without exposing their personnel to the risks of HUMINT, track targets at sensitive locations such as military bases or training camps by simply purchasing location data from commercial providers who collect it from mobile devices with geotargeting enabled used by the operatives present at these places.

Location data can be extremely valuable and must be protected. It can reveal details about the number of users in a location, user and supply movements, daily routines (user and organizational), and can expose otherwise unknown associations between users and locations.

— National Security Agency

==== Advertiser ====
Advertisers benefit from target advertising are reducing resource costs and creating more effective ads by attracting consumers with a strong appeal to these products. Targeted advertising allows advertisers to reduce the cost of advertisement by minimizing "wasted" advertisements to non-interested consumers. Targeted advertising captivates the attention of consumers they were aimed at resulting in higher return on investment for the company.

Because behavioral advertising enables advertisers to more easily determine user preferences and purchasing habits, the ads will be more pertinent and useful for consumers. By creating a more efficient and effective manner of advertising to the consumer, an advertiser benefits greatly in the following ways:

- More efficient campaign development: By having information about the consumer an advertiser can make more concise decisions on how to best communicate with them.
- Better use of advertising dollar: A greater understanding of the targeted audience will allow an advertiser to achieve better results with an advertising campaign
- Increased return on investment: Targeted advertisements will yield higher results for lower costs.

Using information from consumers can benefit the advertiser by developing a more efficient campaign, targeted advertising is proven to work both effectively and efficiently. They don't want to waste time and money advertising to the "wrong people". Through technological advances, the internet has allowed advertisers to target consumers beyond the capabilities of traditional media, and target significantly larger amount.

The main advantage of using targeted advertising is that it can help minimize wasted advertising by using detailed information about individuals who are intended for a product. If consumers produce these ads that are targeted at them, it is more likely they will be interested and click on them. 'Know thy consumer', is a simple principle used by advertisers, when businesses know information about consumers, it can be easier to target them and get them to purchase their product.

Some consumers do not mind if their information is used, and are more accepting of ads with easily accessible links. This is because they may appreciate adverts tailored to their preferences, rather than just generic ads. They are more likely to be directed to products they want, and possibly purchase them, in return generating more income for the business advertising.

== Controversies ==
Targeted advertising has raised controversies, most particularly regarding privacy rights and policies. With behavioral targeting focusing on specific user actions such as site history, browsing history, and buying behavior, this has raised user concern that all activity is being tracked.

Privacy International, a UK-based registered charity that defends and promotes the right to privacy across the world, suggests that from any ethical standpoint such interception of web traffic must be conditional on the based on explicit and informed consent, and action must be taken where organizations can be shown to have acted unlawfully.

A survey conducted in the United States by the Pew Internet & American Life Project between January 20 and February 19, 2012, revealed that most Americans are not in favor of targeted advertising, seeing it as an invasion of privacy. Indeed, 68% of those surveyed said they are "not okay" with targeted advertising because they do not like having their online behavior tracked and analyzed.

Another issue with targeted advertising is the lack of 'new' advertisements of goods or services. Seeing as all ads are tailored to be based on user preferences, no different products will be introduced to the consumer. Hence, in this case, the consumer will be at a loss as they are not exposed to anything new.

Advertisers concentrate their resources on the consumer, which can be very effective when done right. When advertising doesn't work, the consumer can find this creepy and start wondering how the advertiser learned the information about them. Consumers can have concerns over ads targeted at them, which are too personal for comfort, feeling a need for control over their data.

In targeted advertising privacy is a complicated issue due to the type of protected user information and the number of parties involved. The three main parties involved in online advertising are the advertiser, the publisher, and the network. People tend to want to keep their previously browsed websites private, although users 'clickstreams' are being transferred to advertisers who work with ad networks. The user's preferences and interests are visible through their clickstream and their behavioral profile is generated.

As of 2010, many people have found this form of advertising to be concerning and see these tactics as manipulative and a sense of discrimination. As a result of this, several methods have been introduced to avoid advertising. Internet users employing ad blockers are rapidly growing in numbers. The average global ad-blocking rate in early 2018 was estimated at 27 percent. Greece is at the top of the list with more than 40% of internet users admitting to using ad-blocking software. Among the technical population ad-blocking reaches 58%.

=== Privacy and security concerns ===
Targeted advertising raises privacy concerns. Targeted advertising is performed by analyzing consumers' activities through online services such as HTTP cookies and data mining, both of which can be seen as detrimental to consumers' privacy. Marketers research consumers' online activity for targeted advertising campaigns like programmatic and SEO.

Consumers' privacy concerns revolve around today's unprecedented tracking capabilities and whether to trust their trackers. Consumers may feel uncomfortable with sites knowing so much about their activity online. Targeted advertising aims to increase promotions' relevance to potential buyers, delivering ad campaign executions to specified consumers at critical stages in the buying decision process. This potentially limits a consumer's awareness of alternatives and reinforces selective exposure.

Consumers may start avoiding certain sites and brands if they keep getting served the same advertisements and the consumer may feel like they are being watched too much or may start getting annoyed with certain brands. Due to the increased use of tracking cookies all over the web, many sites now have cookie notices that pop up when a visitor lands on a site. The notice informs the visitor about the use of cookies, how they affect the visitor, and the visitor's options in regarding to what information the cookies can obtain.

As of 2019, many online users and advocacy groups were concerned about privacy issues around targeted advertising, because it requires aggregation of large amounts of personal data, including highly sensitive data, such as sexual orientation or sexual preferences, health issues, and location, which is then traded between hundreds of parties in the process of real-time bidding.

This is a controversy that the behavioral targeting industry is trying to contain through education, advocacy, and product constraints to keep all information non-personally identifiable or to obtain permission from end-users. AOL created animated cartoons in 2008 to explain to its users that their past actions may determine the content of ads they see in the future.

Canadian academics at the University of Ottawa Canadian Internet Policy and Public Interest Clinic have recently demanded the federal privacy commissioner investigate online profiling of Internet users for targeted advertising.

The European Commission (via Commissioner Meglena Kuneva) has also raised several concerns related to online data collection (of personal data), profiling, and behavioral targeting, and is looking to "enforce existing regulation".

In October 2009 it was reported that a recent survey carried out by the University of Pennsylvania and the Berkeley Center for Law and Technology found that a large majority of US internet users rejected the use of behavioral advertising. Several research efforts by academics and others as of 2009 have demonstrated that data that is supposedly anonymized can be used to identify real individuals.

In December 2010, online tracking firm Quantcast agreed to pay $2.4M to settle a class-action lawsuit for their use of 'zombie' cookies to track consumers. These zombie cookies, which were on partner sites such as MTV, Hulu, and ESPN, would re-generate to continue tracking the user even if they were deleted. Other uses of such technology include Facebook, and their use of the Facebook Beacon to track users across the internet, to later use for more targeted advertising. Tracking mechanisms without consumer consent are generally frowned upon; however, tracking of consumer behavior online or on mobile devices is key of digital advertising, which is the financial backbone to most of the internet.

In March 2011, it was reported that the online ad industry would begin working with the Council of Better Business Bureaus to start policing itself as part of its program to monitor and regulate how marketers track consumers online, also known as behavioral advertising.

=== Microphone surveillance theories ===
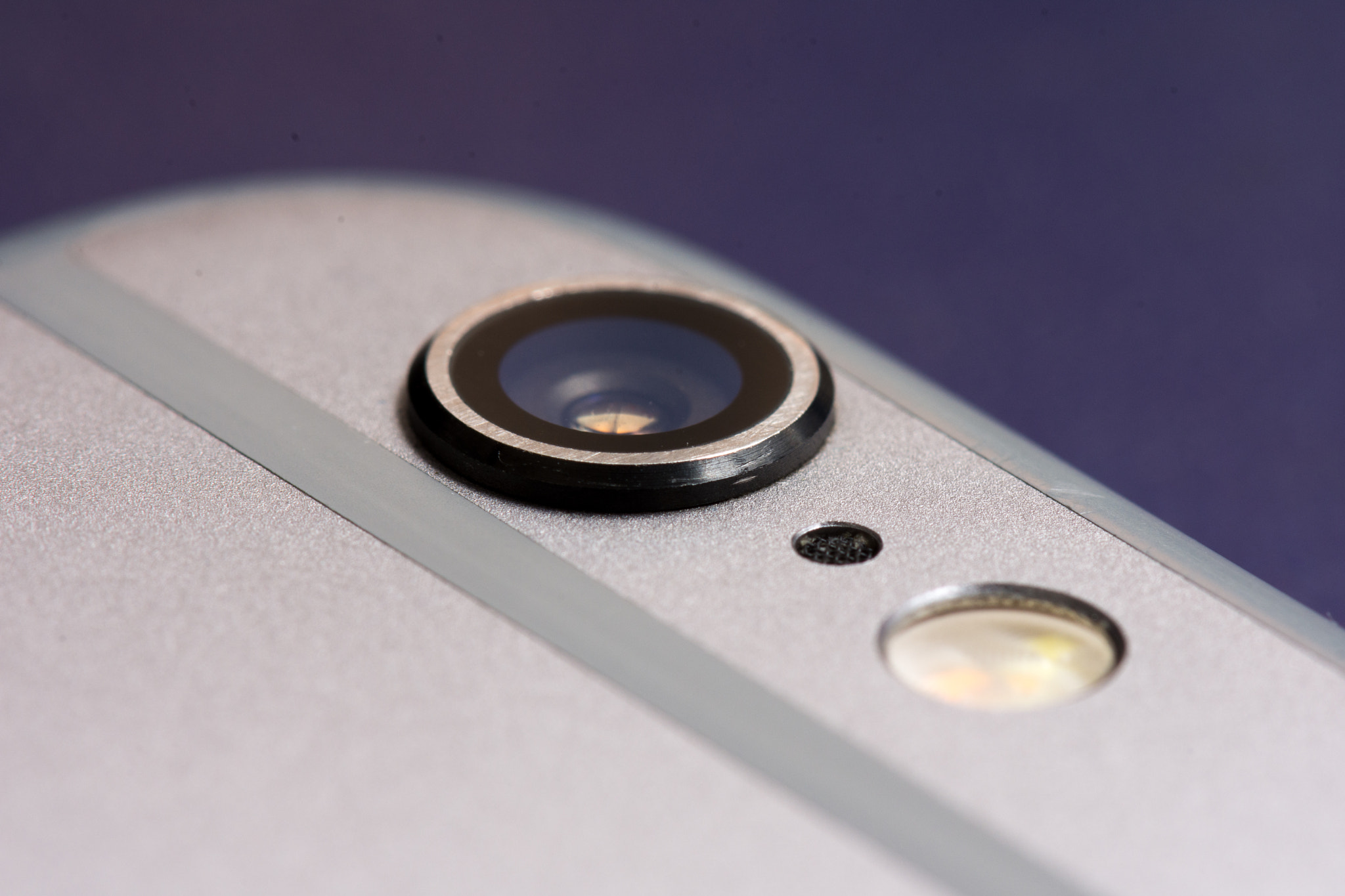
The rear microphone on an iPhone 6, between the camera and flash

Since at least the mid 2010s, many users of smartphones or other mobile devices have advanced the theory that technology companies are using microphones in the devices to record personal conversations for purposes of targeted advertising. Such theories are often accompanied by personal anecdotes involving advertisements with apparent connections to prior conversations. Facebook has denied the practice, and Mark Zuckerberg denied it in congressional testimony. Google has also denied using ambient sound or conversations to target advertising. Technology experts who have investigated the claims have described them as unproven and unlikely. An alternative explanation for apparent connections between conversations and subsequent advertisements is the fact that technology companies track user behavior and interests in many ways other than via microphones.

In December 2023, 404 Media reported that Cox Media Group was advertising a service to marketing professionals called "Active Listening", which involved the ability to listen to microphones installed in smartphones, smart TVs, and other devices in order to target ads to consumers. A pitch deck promoting the capability stated that it targeted "Google/Bing" and that Cox Media Group was a Google Premier Partner. Meta, Amazon, Google, and Microsoft all denied using the service. In response to questions from 404 Media, Google stated that it had removed Cox Media Group from its Partners Program after a review. Cox Media removed the material from their website and denied listening to any conversations.

== History ==
Contemporary data driven marketing can be traced back to the 1980s and the emergence of database marketing, which increased the ease of personalizing customer communications.

== See also ==
- Affinity fraud
- Behavioral retargeting
- Behavioral targeting case law:
  - In re DoubleClick
  - FTC regulation of behavioral advertising
- Cross-device tracking
- Deradicalization
- Digital self-determination
- Digital traces
- Forensic profiling
- Internet manipulation
- Personalization
- Personalized marketing
- Pretargeting
- Reality mining
- Surveillance capitalism
