= Shango (disambiguation) =

Shango is the Yoruba deity of fire and thunder.

Shango or Chango or Changó or Xangô may refer to:

- Shango or Trinidad Orisha, a syncretic religion of Trinidad and Tobago
- Shango (DC Comics), a fictional deity published by DC Comics
- The Shango spider, of the family Dictynidae
- Shangó (Santana album), 1982
- Shango (Juno Reactor album)
- Shango (Peter King album), 2009
- Shango (rock group), a 1960s rock group
- King Shango, an alternate name for reggae musician Capleton
- "Shango", a song on Angélique Kidjo's album Fifa
- King Changó, Latin ska band based in New York
- "Changó", a song by Devo on their album Hardcore Devo: Volume Two
- Charles Wright (wrestler) (born 1961), wrestled as Papa Shango
- Sangu language (Gabon), a Gabonese Niger-Congo language spoken by 30,000 people (also known as Shango, Chango, Isangu, Yisangou, and Yisangu)
- Shango, Italian film from 1970

== See also ==
- Shanga, an archaeological site in Kenya
- Chango (disambiguation)
