= Behavioral retargeting =

Form of online targeted advertising

Behavioral retargeting (also known as behavioral remarketing, or simply, retargeting) is a form of online targeted advertising by which online advertising is targeted to consumers based on their previous internet behaviour. Retargeting tags online users by including a pixel within the target webpage or email, which sets a cookie in the user's browser. Once the cookie is set, the advertiser is able to show ads (often display ads) to that user elsewhere on the internet via an ad exchange.

Dynamic creative (also known as personalized retargeting), allows an advertiser to display a banner created on-the-fly for a particular consumer based on specific pages that they viewed. For example, if a consumer visits an advertiser's website and browses products A, B, and C – they will then be retargeted with a display banner featuring the exact products A, B, and C that they previously viewed. This is typically restricted to the visitor's browsing on a single website.

A refined version improves on re-engagement with customers. If a customer begins an online order, for example, but fails to complete it, a flag indicates they had an interest in the product being ordered. Later, ads showing the product of interest can be custom-linked to point back into the order system. When the user clicks on the ad, they are returned to their incomplete order.

== Types ==
While all retargeting depends on setting cookies in a user's browser, there are several different methods of doing this:

- Site retargeting
- Search retargeting
- Link retargeting
- Email retargeting
- Social retargeting

== Pricing ==
Retargeting ad campaigns usually run on lower cost media, such as display ads, which not only increases effectiveness by specifically targeting an interested audience, but also improves the overall ROI of the advertiser. A common use-case of retargeting is situations where a website visitor's actions did not result in a sale or conversion.

Retargeting providers employ a variety of pricing models to charge advertisers for the ads viewed by consumers. Three prominent models include:

- CPM (Cost per mille or cost per thousand)
- CPC (cost per click)
- CPA (cost per action)

Cost per impression (CPM) is a common metric used in the online advertising industry to charge advertisers for inventory based on a set price per thousand-page impressions. An impression is defined as any time a banner ad loads on an individual's web browser.

Pay per click (PPC) charges advertisers for every verifiable click that leads consumers back to a retailer's website. Unlike the CPM model, which charges advertisers a flat rate, advertisers working under the PPC model are only charged when a person clicks on an ad.

Cost per action (CPA) is a pricing model in which advertisers are charged based on pre-arranged action (a purchase, a view through, etc.), although a completed sale is the most common action used under the CPA model.

== Concerns ==
In the United States, several organizations, including the Federal Trade Commission, Congress, and the media, have expressed privacy concerns around the practice of retargeting; however, responsible personalized retargeting providers do not collect personally identifiable information (PII) on consumers. Providers should be blind to a user's age, sex and other personal information. Instead, providers rely upon data gathered from cookies that are placed on a consumer's browser by the websites they visit. This information should not be shared among publishers, other advertisers or third parties and cannot be linked to a specific user. The United States has not legislated many laws around the practice, and instead relies upon the industry and its overarching organizations, such as the Interactive Advertising Bureau, Network Advertising Initiative and TRUSTe to self-regulate. In October 2010, the IAB announced its Advertising Option Icon, which partner sites will place near banner advertisements that collect non-PII user data.

In the EU, the 2002 ePrivacy Directive and its 2009 revision require opt-in consent for the use of cookies and stipulate that users must be given the option of opting out.

== See also ==
- Behavioral targeting
- Site retargeting
