= Open rate =

Rate at which electronic or physical mail are opened

There are two types of "open rates" one for electronic mail (a.k.a. e-mail; see below) and one for physical mail (a.k.a. snail mail via the USPS or other physical mail carrier).

== Email open rate ==
The email open rate is a measure primarily used by marketers as an indication of how many people "view" or "open" the commercial electronic mail they send out. It is most commonly expressed as a percentage and calculated by dividing the number of email messages opened by the total number of email messages sent (excluding those that bounced).

Some Email Service Providers (ESP) also track unique email opens. Unlike total opens, unique opens exclude repeat opens of the same email by the same recipient.

Email opens are typically tracked using a transparent 1x1 pixel, or small transparent tracking image, that is embedded in outgoing emails. When the client or browser used to display the email requests that image, then an "open" is recorded for that email by the image's host server. The email will not be counted as an open until one of the following occurs:

1. The recipient enables the images in the email or
2. The recipient interacts with the email by clicking on a link

The open rate of any given email can vary based on a number of variables. For example, the type of industry the email is being sent to. In addition, the day and time an email is scheduled or sent to recipients can have an effect on email open rate. The length of an email's subject line can also affect whether or not it is opened.

Open rate is one of the earliest metrics applied in email marketing, but its continued use has become controversial due to conflicting views on its usefulness.

The open rate for an email sent to multiple recipients is then most often calculated as the total number of “opened” emails, expressed as a percentage of the total number of emails sent or—more usually—delivered. The number delivered is itself measured as the number of emails sent out minus the number of bounces generated by those emails.

This method leads to problems with interpretation, since the request for the tracking image gives no indication of whether the email's recipient actually viewed or read the email or its contents.

In addition, many webmail services and email clients block images by default, or the recipient may elect to receive text-only versions of an email. In both cases, no image call can ever be made, further reducing the accuracy of the open rate measure.

As a result, open rates are broadly rejected as an absolute measure of a commercial email's performance. However, many marketers use open rates as a relative measure, for example to compare the performances of emails sent to similar recipient groups, but at different times or with different subject headers.

The normal open rate for different businesses and types of messages can vary. According to 2023 statistics, overall it is approximately 30–40%. In the finance and real estate industries, the percentage is generally higher than in IT or education sectors. The healthcare and beauty industries have an average open rate of 23.58%, while the food service or restaurant industry can expect a higher rate (41.37%). Sometimes 20% can be a good indicator, and sometimes even 30% can be below the norm for a specific sector. The main goal is for the rate to remain stable or show improvements compared to previous campaigns.

Usually, the open rate is analyzed in conjunction with other metrics: clicks, conversion, unsubscribe numbers, and complaints. This comprehensive analysis is necessary to get a complete picture of the campaign's effectiveness.

There are several sociological and technical trends that influence the open rate:

- The sports, arts, religion, and hobbies industries have a higher email open rate than retail companies.
- Emails with a narrow focus tend to have a higher open rate than those on widely discussed topics.
- The larger the mailing list, the lower the open rate.
- Some users disable image display, so their opening of the email isn’t counted unless they click a link.
- Plain text emails are not counted in the open rate, as they do not contain images.
- Some subscribers have an image preview feature enabled. This counts as an open, although the recipient may not fully view the email.

== Physical mail open rate ==
The "open rate" for physical mail is difficult to quantify when compared to electronic mail, but it is extremely important to the success or failure of response-oriented mail (marketing, billing, recovery, renewals, etc.). In fact, physical mail open rates can, and should, be further segmented and defined:

Open Rate (physical mail): The rate at which a piece of mail is opened within 30 days, as determined by the recipient’s conscious and sub-conscious judgments about the un-opened mail piece; this decision is often made in 3–5 seconds.

Open NOW Rate (physical mail): The rate at which a piece of mail is opened while it is being looked at for the first time, as determined by the recipient’s conscious and sub-conscious judgments about the un-opened mail piece; this decision is often made in 3–5 seconds.

Though physical mail, also known as “snail mail” or direct mail, may be overshadowed by email marketing, it's still considered an important part of some businesses' marketing strategy.

== See also ==
- Web bug
- E-mail tracking
- Email marketing
- click rates
