= Pulse 360 =

Pulse 360, Inc was an online advertising and marketing network which was based in Getzville, New York. The company was founded in October 1999 under the name Kanoodle. The company reached over 65% of online users monthly and also at one time reached 141 million unique visitors across over 1000 websites. The ad distribution centered on highly visited national and local news sites across the United States including NBCNews.com, Comcast, Weather.com, and ABCNews.com.

== Origin ==
Pulse 360 was originally launched under the name Kanoodle.com in October 1999 and was founded by Kent Keating. Kanoodle specialized in search targeted sponsored links and eventually branched out into content targeted sponsored links in January 2004 with the addition of CBSMarketwatch as a partner. The content targeted sponsored links program was renamed Pulse 360 in August 2006. In December 2009, Pulse 360 became one of the first companies to pass the Interactive Advertising Bureau’s Click Measurement Guideline’s Audit after Google, Yahoo and Microsoft. Pulse 360 was also a Network Advertising Initiative (NAI) member and was added as compliant with the IAB/NAI Code of Conduct in April 2011. They are also DAA Self Regulatory Principles compliant for online behavioral advertising. Pulse360 added retargeting capabilities to their list of advertising services in July 2011.

== Business ==
Pulse360 maintained relationships with hundreds of online publishers primarily in the news space. MSNBC.com, CNN.com, Abcnews.com, Cox Media and USAToday inventory are included in its publisher network. Pulse360 advertisers could customize campaigns using various options offered by the company. Geotargeting to country, state, zip or DMA along with audience targeting towards user demo, interest or intent were available. The company was approved to serve third party ads on both the Google Doubleclick Ad Exchange and Yahoo.
