= Chango (company) =

Canadian online marketing company

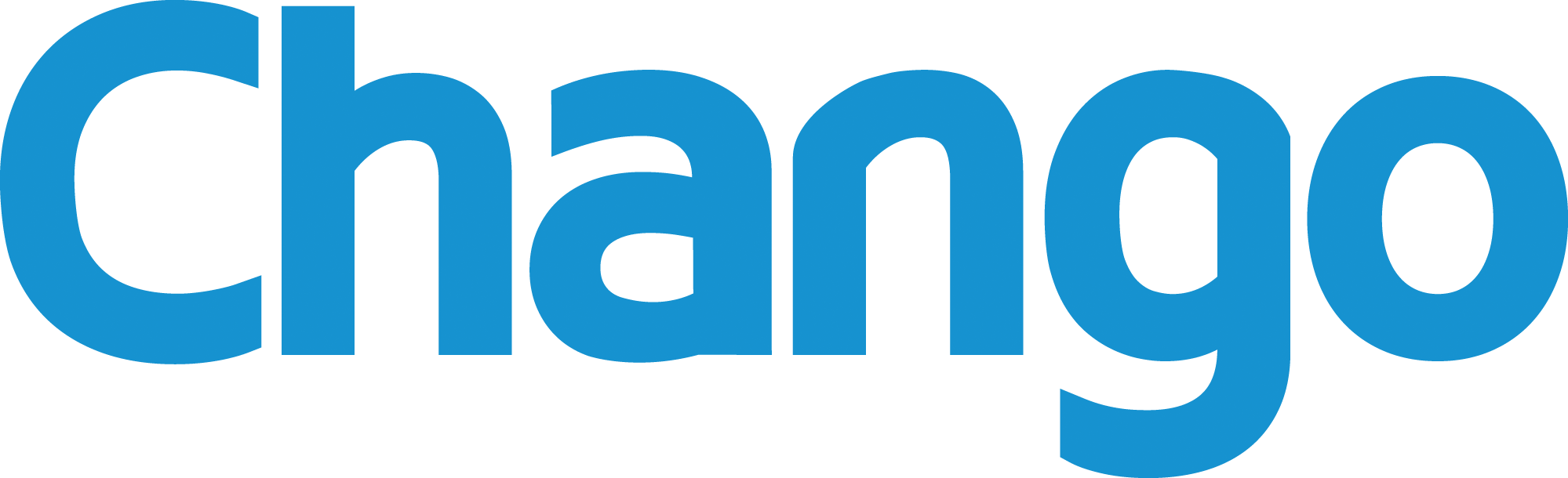
Logo of Chango, Inc.

Chango, Inc. was a Canadian-based, online marketing company founded in 2008, focusing on search retargeting and programmatic marketing. It was acquired by Rubicon Project in 2015 for $122 million, but it was shut down in 2017.

== History ==
The company was founded in Toronto, by Chris Sukornyk along with Mazdak Rezvan and Dax Hamman. In 2012, it appointed Paul McIntyre to lead its Platform Solutions group and hired Keith Lorizio as chief revenue officer. Chango was recognized in Deloitte's Technology Fast 50 program in 2014, ranking first overall in Canada with a growth rate of 69,800%.

In 2017, Rubicon shut down Chango, stating that the company did not meet performance expectations.

=== Funding ===
In June 2010, Chango raised $1.4 million in Series A funding from investors including Metamorphic Ventures, iNovia Capital and Extreme Venture Partners. The company secured a second round of funding in February 2011, followed by a third round of $12 million in funding in November 2012.

== Product ==
Chango was an early adopter of search retargeting. The company served display ads to potential customers based on their recent search activity. By the first quarter of 2013, it was working with 75 of the top 500 internet retailers.

Chango claimed to be able to capture the recent search activity of hundreds of millions of users, using anonymous cookies. The company also re-targeted display advertisement to users if they matched a specific campaign. Display advertisements were purchased through a demand side platform (DSP) that operated across multiple ad networks, such as appnexus, rubicon, and double click.

Chango was a member of the Network Advertising Initiative (NAI). Along with its partners, it offered search retargeting campaigns and consumers had the option to opt out of them. The company stated that it did not capture personally identifiable information (PII).

In December 2012, Chango Inc. integrated directly with Facebook to bring search intent data to social media targeting.

Chango Inc. released the industry's first programmatic marketing platform, which combined data management platform (DMP) with demand side platform (DSP) capabilities.
