= Pretargeting =

Pretargeting (also known as behavioral predictive marketing) is a form of online targeted advertising by which online advertising is targeted to consumers based on their previous actions on many websites. Pretargeting is advanced prospecting technology used in account-based marketing to target the core decision-makers within a company through IP addresses.

== Pretargeting practices ==
Pretargeting is the ability to use big data. Big data is a corporate strategic asset that has a direct impact on the bottom line. By pretargeting, advertisers can capture consumers at the beginning of the purchase funnel. Pretargeting is a method to identify websites that people have likely or actually visited before coming to a retailer or publishers website; it allows you to target visitors before they have even been on your site. It gives advertisers the ability to display their ads to the right audience and to gain insight to the customer's upcoming purchase.

Pretargeting paired with one-to-one marketing offers businesses with an established customer base a way to deliver personalized communications to the right person at the right time, in advance of consumer behavior.

Pretargeting is often seen as the future of retargeting.

== See also ==
- Behavioral retargeting
- Behavioral targeting
