= DataNeutrality =

DataNeutrality.org is a New York-based non-profit organization that is dedicated to creating socially responsible data collection protocols for the internet.

DataNeutrality works in concert with another New York-based organization, the for-profit start-up Mezzobit, to set data rules, perform compliance for Mezzobit, and send report cards to Mezzobit customers. A primary focus of the organizations is to govern the operation of third-party data collection tags, also called web beacons, and website visitor tracking. The intention is to create a self-regulatory framework for Internet data to augment industry standard and regulatory efforts.

The pairing of these two organizations is an example of the Regulation 2.0 paradigm that encourages corporate transparency and accountability to promote sustainable and positive societal outcomes.
