= Sean Lane =

Sean Lane (or similar) may refer to:

- Sean Lane, plaintiff in Lane v. Facebook, Inc.
- Sean Lane (footballer) (born 1964), English footballer
- Shawn Lane (1963–2003), American musician
- Shaun Lane (born 1994), Australian rugby league footballer
