= Search retargeting =

Marketing strategy

Search retargeting is a form of retargeting employed by online marketers that target an audience based on the previous searches they conduct on other websites. Unlike site retargeting, search retargeting is designed to find new customers which have likely never been to a marketer's website before.

While search advertising is a method of placing online advertisements within the results of search engine queries, search retargeting attempts to extend the interaction with the same searchers when they move away from search query results pages to other online activities and websites. Search retargeting ads are typically displayed as display ads.

== Comparison with Site retargeting ==
Search retargeting targets consumers who have searched about the product category on the search engine but never visited the firm's website. Site retargeting targets consumers who have previously visited the firm's website but left without making a purchase.

== See also ==
- Email retargeting
- Site retargeting
