= Chango =

Chango or El Chango may refer to:

== People ==
- José de Jesús Méndez Vargas (born 1974), nickname El Chango, alleged Mexican drug cartel leader
- Chango Spasiuk (born 1968), Argentine chamamé musician and accordion player
- Juan Carlos Cárdenas (born 1945), nickname El Chango, Argentine footballer and coach
- Héctor Icazuriaga (born 1955), nickname El Chango, Secretary of Intelligence of Argentina

== Arts and entertainment ==
- Chango Family, a band based in Ontario, Canada
- "Chango", a song by Devo off of Hardcore Devo: Volume Two
- El Chango de los Dos Plátanos, a track on the 2003 Panda album La Revancha Del Príncipe Charro

== Other ==
- Chango (company), a Toronto/NYC based ad retargeting and online media planning company
- Chango people, a tribe of native South Americans who inhabited the coast of Peru and Chile
- Changó, thunder god in Yoruba mythology
- Chang-o, Moon goddess in Chinese mythology
- Sangu language (Gabon), a language spoken by the Masangu people of Gabon

== See also ==
- Changgo, a Korean musical instrument
- Csángó, a Hungarian minority in Romania
