= Email retargeting =

Email retargeting can refer to either:

- Retargeting an audience with display ads after they have read an email from the advertiser (display-ad based)
- Emailing a website visitor after their website visit (email-based)

Email retargeting is a commonly used form of digital marketing.

== Display-ad based ==
Email from the advertiser is sent to recipients with a tracking pixel that tags the recipient's browser, in the same way they would be tagged if visiting a webpage.

Email retargeting is only effective if the email is opened in a web browser, where the tracking pixel will function. Any recipient who uses a dedicated mail client will not be tagged. Additionally, Gmail's decision to cache images means that this method of advertising does not work with Gmail addresses.

== Email-based ==
Email retargeting relies on sending personalized email to an anonymous website visitor.

1. Visitor browses a website, views a product and leaves
2. Cookies from the website matches the user to an email address
3. Visitor receives a personalized offer via email message concerning the product they viewed

This is possible thanks to using a data management platform or a noCRM email retargeting provider, where cookies collected on a website include the IP address of the visitor (the IP address can be read from the visitor's web browser's header information). The IP address is then matched against the IP addresses previously collected with form submissions that include an email address (whether those forms were completed on that website or on another).

This form of remarketing helps increasing conversion by reaching interested audience only.

== See also ==
- Behavioral retargeting
- Email tracking
